= Fortified Sector of Altkirch =

Former French military organization

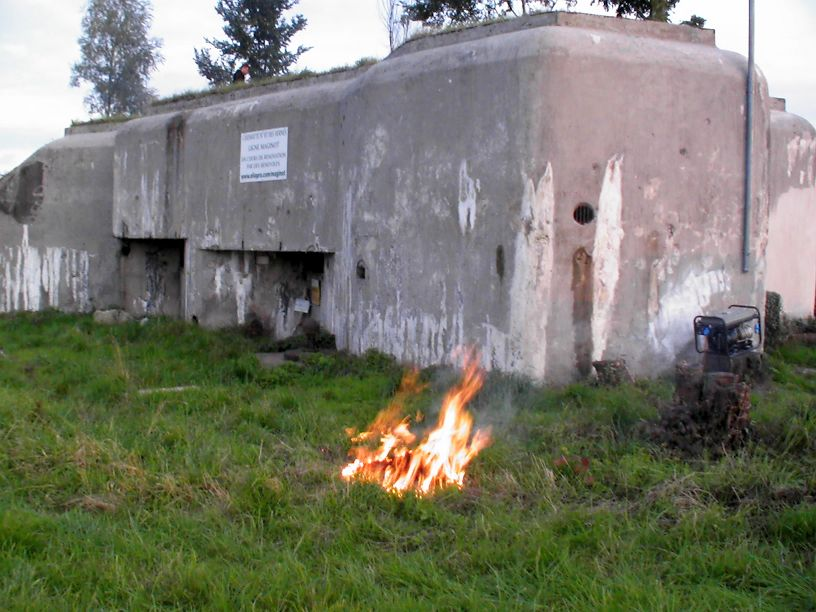
Casemate des Vernes

The Fortified Sector of Altkirch (Secteur Fortifiée d'Altkirch) was the French military organization that in 1940 controlled the section of the French frontier with Germany and Switzerland in the vicinity of Basel.It was built by France following the First world war from 1928 - 1940. it was built under the mandate of André Maginot, the then minister of war. The sector's principal defense against an advance from Germany was the Rhine itself, which could be crossed only by boat or by seizing a bridge crossing. The frontier with Switzerland was not regarded as a high-risk location, save for a possible advance by German forces through Switzerland. Originally planned as a full extension of the Maginot Line with artillery ouvrages, the sector's fortifications were scaled back and chiefly took the form of casemates and blockhouses. The SF Altkirch adjoined the Fortified Sector of Mulhouse to the north and the Fortified Sector of Montbéliard to the west.

== Concept and organization ==
The region bordering Switzerland was treated as a low-priority area, but received a substantial number of casemates and blockhouses nonetheless. Initial plans floated in 1934 proposed four artillery ouvrages (Note: English-language sources use the French term ouvrage as the preferred term for the Maginot positions, in preference to "fort", a term usually reserved for older fortifications with passive defenses in the form of walls and ditches. The literal translation of ouvrage in the sense of a fortification in English is "work." A gros ouvrage is a large fortification with a significant artillery component, while a petit ouvrage is smaller, with lighter arms.) at Stetten, Ranspach-le-Haut, Bettlach and Trois-Maisons, with four more infantry ouvrages at Uffheim, Helfrantzkirch, Ranspach-le-Haut, Bettlach and Oltingue. These were to be supported by 68 casemates. The project was cancelled in 1936 and were replaced by a more modest program that created three centers of resistance at Sierentz, Bettlach-Oltingue and at Roedersdorff-Blochmont. A total of six blockhouses were built, each housing two 75 mm guns, with six more blockhouses armed with two 47 mm guns, two machine guns and two automatic rifles.

Three more resistance centers were proposed at Stetten, Ransbach-le-Haut and Trois-Maisons in 1937, but were replaced by more casemates, prepared for mobile 155mm and 240mm howitzers to cover the bridges at Basel and Huningue. Thirteen blockhouses, four observation positions and fourteen infantry shelters were planned for the Glaserberg, along the Swiss border.

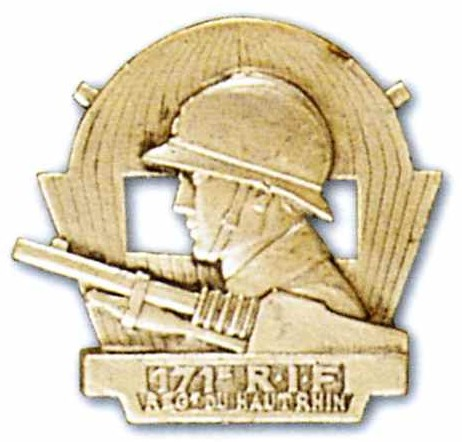
Insignia of the 171st RIF

== Command ==
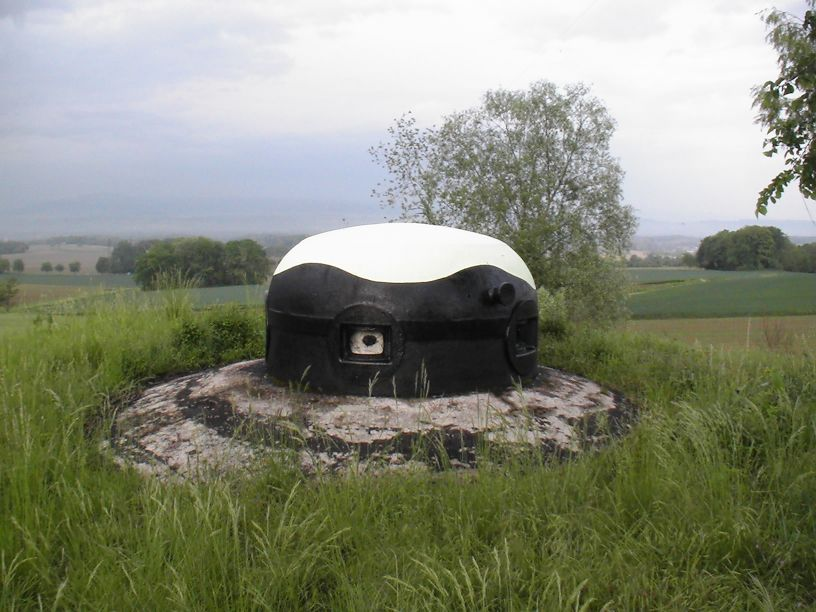
Cloche at the Casemate des Vernes

Until 16 March 1940, the Altkirch sector was part of the Fortified Region of Belfort. Afterwards, the Altkirch sector was under the command of the 44th Army Fortress Corps under General Tence, which was in turn under the command of the French 8th Army, General Garchery at the Fort de Giromagny, part of Army Group 3 under General Besson. The 44th Corps' headquarters was at Dannemarie. The 67th Infantry Division, commanded by General Boutignon, provided infantry support. The 67th DI was a series B reserve division, not suitable for heavy or sustained combat Following to its reorganization, the sector was called the Defensive Sector of Altkirch.

The SF/SD Altkirch was commanded by General Salvan. Fortress troops were provided by the 12th and 171st Fortress Infantry Regiments. Artillery support was provided by the third and fourth battalions of the 159th Position Artillery Regiment. At the midpoint of the Battle of France on 1 June 1940, the fortress troops of the SF Altkirch amounted to two fortress infantry regiments in five battalions, comprising 165 officers and 3,300 men.

== Description ==
The sector includes, in order from north to south, the following significant casemates and blockhouses in each sub-sector:

=== Sub-sector of Franken ===
171st Fortress Infantry Regiment (171e Régiment d'Infanterie de Forteresse (RIF)), Lt. Colonel Demange. All positions were constructed by the Army Engineering Service (Service Technique du Génie (STG)).

- Casemate d'Uffheim Nord-Ouest (80b), two 75mm guns
- Casemate d'Uffheim Nord-Est (80), two 75mm guns
- Casemate de l'Hôpital-de-Sierentz (81), two 75mm guns
- Blockhaus de Sierentz Voie-Ferrée Ouest (82), single blockhouse with one GFM cloche
- Blockhaus de Sierentz Voie-Ferrée Est (83), single blockhouse with one GFM cloche
- Blockhaus du Chemin-Creux (84), double blockhouse with one GFM cloche and command post
- Blockhaus du Haselberg (85), double blockhouse with one GFM cloche
- Blockhaus de Aschenbach (86), double blockhouse with one GFM cloche
- Blockhaus des Vernes (87), single blockhouse with one GFM cloche
- Blockhaus de Stetten (88), double blockhouse with two GFM cloches
- Blockhaus du Tapfelbaum (89), double blockhouse with one GFM cloche
- Blockhaus de Helfranzkirch Nord-Ouest (90), double blockhouse with one GFM cloche
- Blockhaus des Trois-Maisons-Nord (91), double blockhouse with one GFM cloche
- Blockhaus de Ranspach Nord (93), double blockhouse with one GFM cloche
- Blockhaus de Ranspach Sud (94), double blockhouse with one GFM cloche
- Blockhaus de la Cote 445 (95), double blockhouse with two GFM cloches
- Blockhaus du Monument (96), double blockhouse with one GFM cloche
- Blockhaus de Knoeringue Est (97), double blockhouse with one Pamart cloche
- Blockhaus de Knoeringue Sud-Est (99), double blockhouse with one GFM cloche
- Blockhaus du Willerbach (100), single blockhouse with one GFM cloche
- Blockhaus du Tiefenbach Nord (101), double blockhouse with one GFM cloche
- Blockhaus du Tiefenbach Sud (102), double blockhouse with one GFM cloche
- Blockhaus du Calvaire (103), double blockhouse with two GFM cloches
- Casemate de Breitenhaag (104), two 75mm guns
- Blockhaus de Breitenhaag (105), double blockhouse with one GFM cloche
- Blockhaus du Cesarhof Nord (106), double blockhouse
- Blockhais du Caesarhof Sud (107), double blockhouse
- Blockhaus du Strengwald Nord (108), double blockhouse
- Blockhaus du Strengwald Sud (109), double blockhouse
- Casemate de Bettlach (110), double blockhouse
- Blockhaus de Bettlach Nord (111), double blockhouse with one GFM cloche
- Blockhaus de Bettlach Sud (112), double blockhouse with one GFM cloche

=== Sub-sector of the Ill (Durmenach) ===
12th Fortress Infantry Regiment (12e Régiment d'Infanterie de Forteresse (RIF)), Lt. Colonel Françon. All positions were constructed by the STG.

- Casemate d'Oltingue (113), two 75mm guns
- Blockhaus de Raedersdorf (114), double blockhouse with two GFM cloches
- Casemate de Raedersdorf (115), two 75mm guns
- Blockhaus de Brochritty Est (116), double blockhouse with one GFM cloche
- Blockhaus de Brochritty Sud (117), double blockhouse

Four heavy gun emplacements were planned:

- Willerhof, with four 155mm gun positions and three shelters
- Breitenhaag, with two 240mm gun positions and two shelters
- Eichwald, with four 155mm positions and three shelters
- Strengwald, with two 240mm positions and one shelter

Troop barracks were located at Uffheim, near Ranspach-le-Bas, near Bettlach, Ferrette and Raedersdorf.

=== Glaserberg ===
Additionally, 47 positions were planned by the Main d'Oeuvre Militaire (MOM)), which was in charge of small-scale fortifications, on the Glasenberg massif looking into Switzerland. 29 were built, a mixture of blockhouses, observation points and infantry shelters.

== Battle of France ==
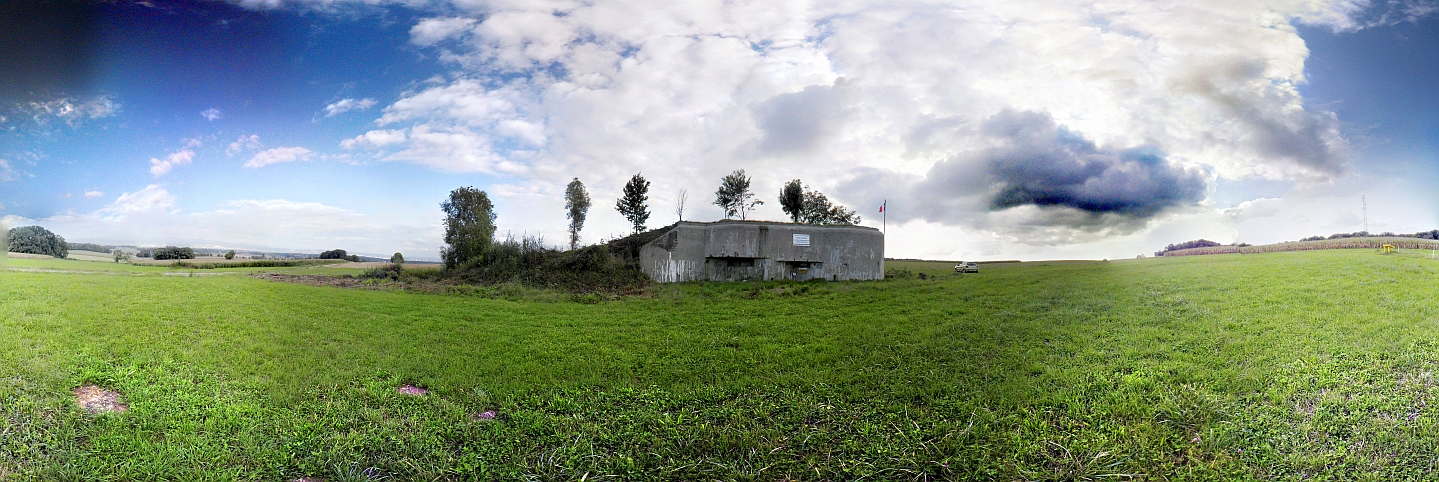
Panorama of the Casemate des Vernes

The German offensive (Operation Kleiner Bär) across the Rhine was concentrated in the area near and to the north of Colmar, with little fighting in the Altkirch sector. The offensive, launched on 15 June, was rendered unimportant when the German XIX Corps under General Heinz Guderian reached the Swiss border on 17 June, behind the main French line.

The 12th RIF was deployed on the heights of the Jura until 17 June, when it was called back to Belfort for the defense of the city. The second battalion was captured the next day, while the first battalion, retreating to Masevaux, was captured on the 19th at Chapelle-sous-Rougemont.

The 171st RIF began a retreat toward the Dollar Valley and Masevaux on 18 June. Fighting ensued at Sentheim on the 19th, with Colonel Lavelle's detachment and the 21st battalion captured there. The remainder retreated to the Lauw-Mortzwiller area. The second and third battalions were captured at Masevaux, while the remainder of the regiment, now amounting to about one hundred men, retreated through the Stiftkopf forest, ending up at the Tête-de-Neuf-Bois. On the 26th the regiment was ordered to the Charbonniers village, where it was captured.

== Bibliography ==
- Allcorn, William. The Maginot Line 1928-45. Oxford: Osprey Publishing, 2003. ISBN 1-84176-646-1
- Kaufmann, J.E. and Kaufmann, H.W. Fortress France: The Maginot Line and French Defenses in World War II, Stackpole Books, 2006. ISBN 0-275-98345-5
- Kaufmann, J.E., Kaufmann, H.W., Jancovič-Potočnik, A. and Lang, P. The Maginot Line: History and Guide, Pen and Sword, 2011. ISBN 978-1-84884-068-3
- Mary, Jean-Yves; Hohnadel, Alain; Sicard, Jacques. Hommes et Ouvrages de la Ligne Maginot, Tome 1. Paris, Histoire & Collections, 2001. ISBN 2-908182-88-2 (in French)
- Mary, Jean-Yves; Hohnadel, Alain; Sicard, Jacques. Hommes et Ouvrages de la Ligne Maginot, Tome 3. Paris, Histoire & Collections, 2003. ISBN 2-913903-88-6 (in French)
- Mary, Jean-Yves; Hohnadel, Alain; Sicard, Jacques. Hommes et Ouvrages de la Ligne Maginot, Tome 5. Paris, Histoire & Collections, 2009. ISBN 978-2-35250-127-5 (in French)
- Romanych, Marc; Rupp, Martin. Maginot Line 1940: Battles on the French Frontier. Oxford: Osprey Publishing, 2010. ISBN 1-84176-646-1
