= Geispitzen =

Commune in Grand Est, France

- Commune
- The church in Geispitzen

- Coat of arms
- Location of Geispitzen
- Location within France Location within Grand Est
- Coordinates: 47°40′06″N 7°25′18″E
- Country: France
- Region: Grand Est
- Department: Haut-Rhin
- Arrondissement: Mulhouse
- Canton: Brunstatt-Didenheim
- Intercommunality: Saint-Louis Agglomération

Government
  - Mayor (2020–2026): Christian Baumlin
- Area^{1}: 6.02 km^{2} (2.32 sq mi)
- Elevation: 288 m (945 ft)
- Highest elevation: 333 m (1,093 ft)
- Lowest elevation: 246 m (807 ft)
- Population (2023): 516
  - Density: 85.7/km^{2} (222/sq mi)
- Time zone: UTC+01:00 (CET)
  - Summer (DST): UTC+02:00 (CEST)
- INSEE/Postal code: 68103 /68510
- ^{1} French Land Register data, which excludes lakes, ponds, glaciers > 1 km^{2} (0.386 sq mi or 247 acres) and river estuaries.

Geispitzen (French pronunciation: [gaiʃpitsən]; Alsatian: Gaispítze) is a commune in the Haut-Rhin department in Alsace in north-eastern France.

Humans have occupied Geispitzen since the Neolithic period. Thereafter, two Gallo-Roman settlements were spotted there, as remains of the Kembs - Besançon Roman road can still be found to this day. A village, which disappeared before medieval times, was also located in the Altrad locality. The first mentions of the commune's name date back to 1267. The village benefited from two remarkable development periods: one at the end of the 16th century and the beginning of the 17th century, the second at the end of the 17th century after the Thirty Years' War. The village endured significant destruction during the Second World War, and a modern estate was built around 1970.

== Population ==
The commune's gentilic are Geispitzenoises and Geispitzenois in French (Geispitzenians in English).

Historical population
Year	Pop.	±% p.a.
1968	303	—
1975	306	+0.14%
1982	395	+3.71%
1990	441	+1.39%
1999	418	−0.59%
2007	415	−0.09%
2012	429	+0.67%
2017	449	+0.92%
2023	516	+2.35%
Source: INSEE

== See also ==
- Communes of the Haut-Rhin département
