= Waltenheim =

Commune in Grand Est, France

Waltenheim Wàltene
- Commune
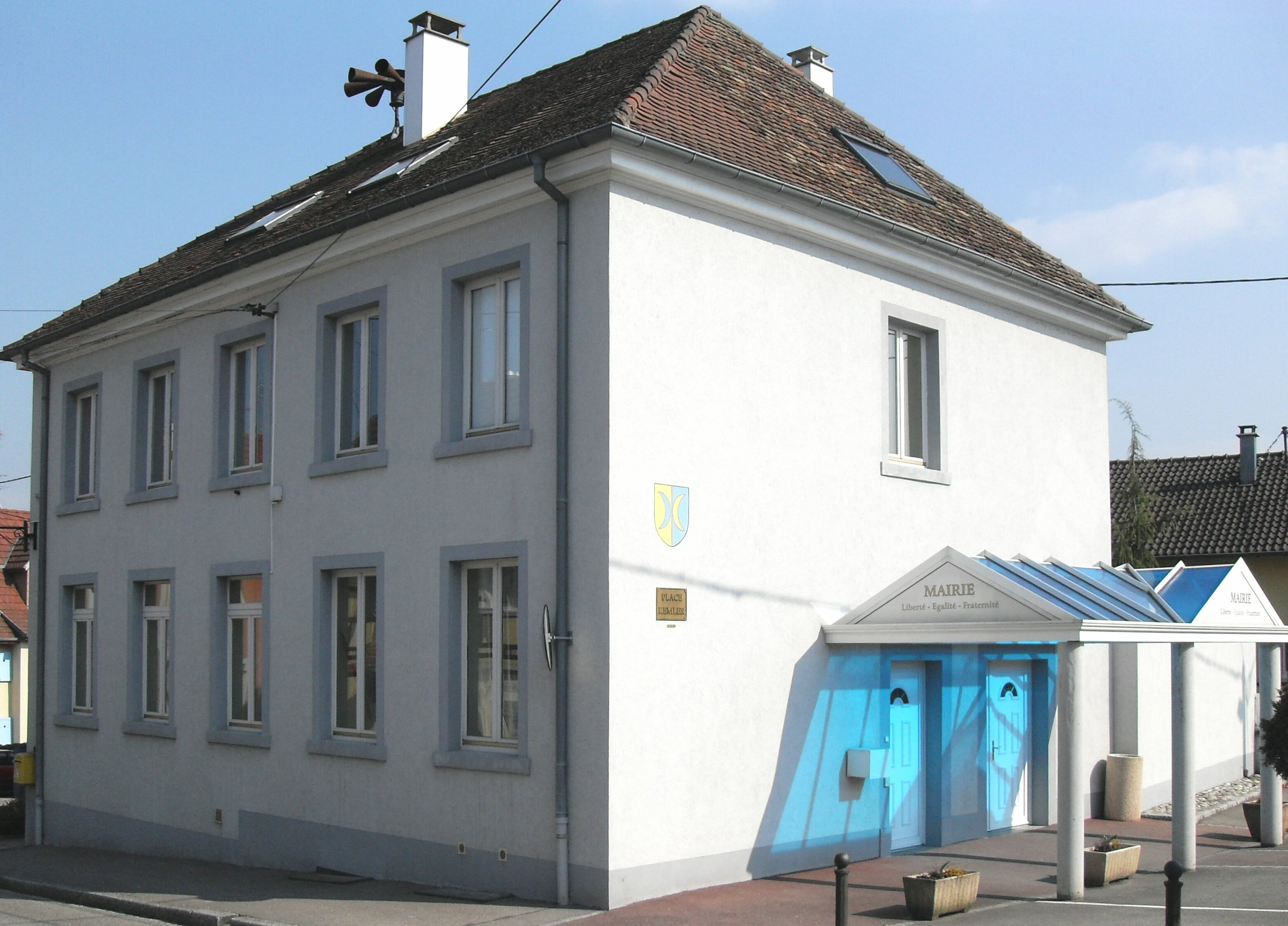
- The town hall in Waltenheim

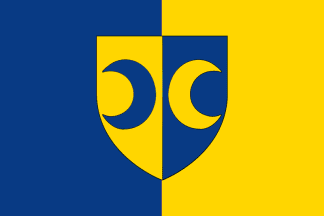
- Flag Coat of arms
- Location of Waltenheim
- Location within France Location within Grand Est
- Coordinates: 47°39′28″N 7°25′35″E
- Country: France
- Region: Grand Est
- Department: Haut-Rhin
- Arrondissement: Mulhouse
- Canton: Brunstatt-Didenheim
- Intercommunality: Saint-Louis Agglomération

Government
  - Mayor (2023–2026): Valérie Kuntz
- Area^{1}: 2.32 km^{2} (0.90 sq mi)
- Elevation: 285 m (935 ft)
- Highest elevation: 313 m (1,027 ft)
- Lowest elevation: 268 m (879 ft)
- Population (2023): 506
  - Density: 218/km^{2} (565/sq mi)
- Time zone: UTC+01:00 (CET)
  - Summer (DST): UTC+02:00 (CEST)
- INSEE/Postal code: 68357 /68510
- ^{1} French Land Register data, which excludes lakes, ponds, glaciers > 1 km^{2} (0.386 sq mi or 247 acres) and river estuaries.

Waltenheim (French pronunciation: [valtənaim]; Alemannic German: Wàltene) is a commune in the Haut-Rhin department in Alsace in north-eastern France.

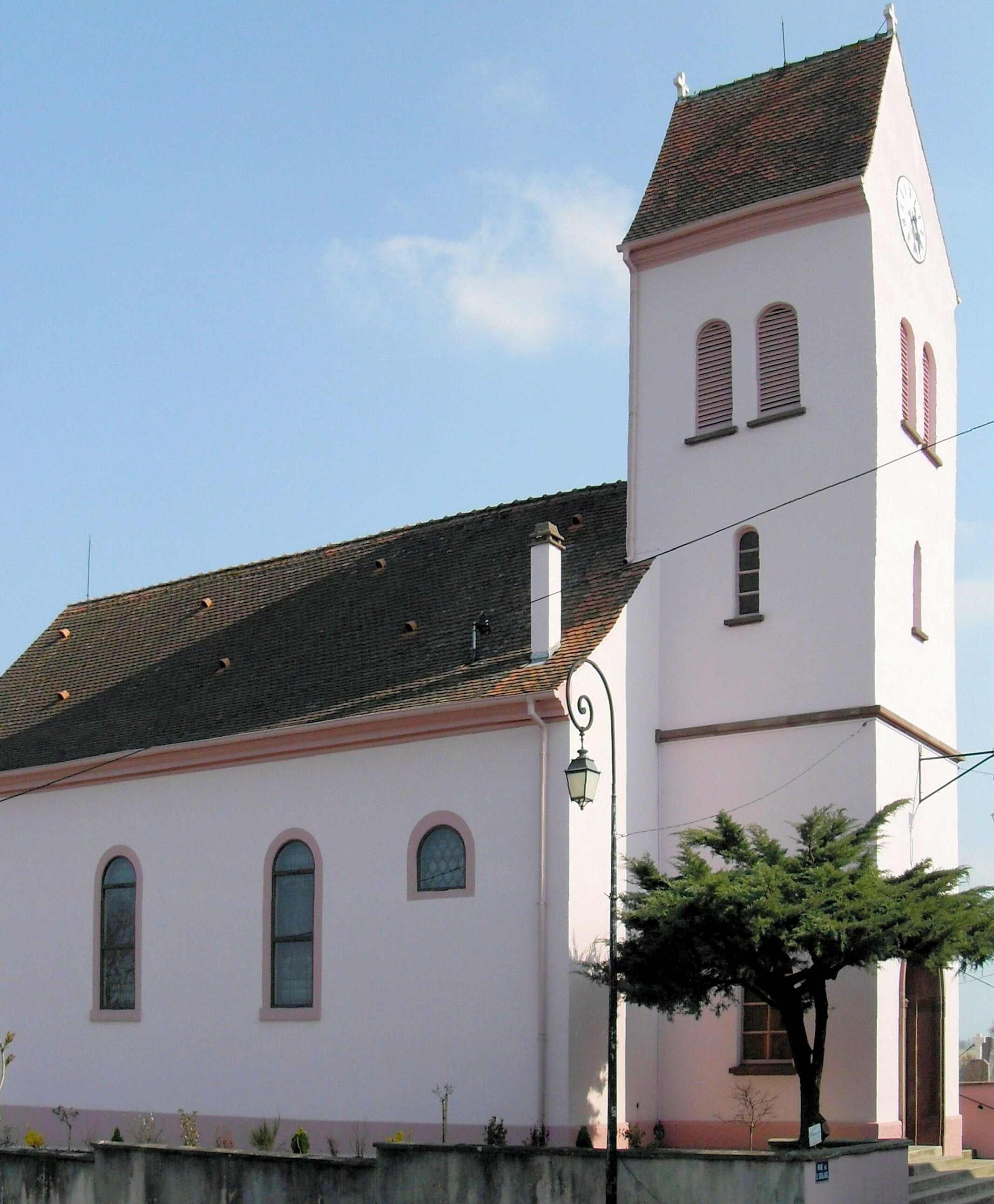
Saint Peter and Paul Church

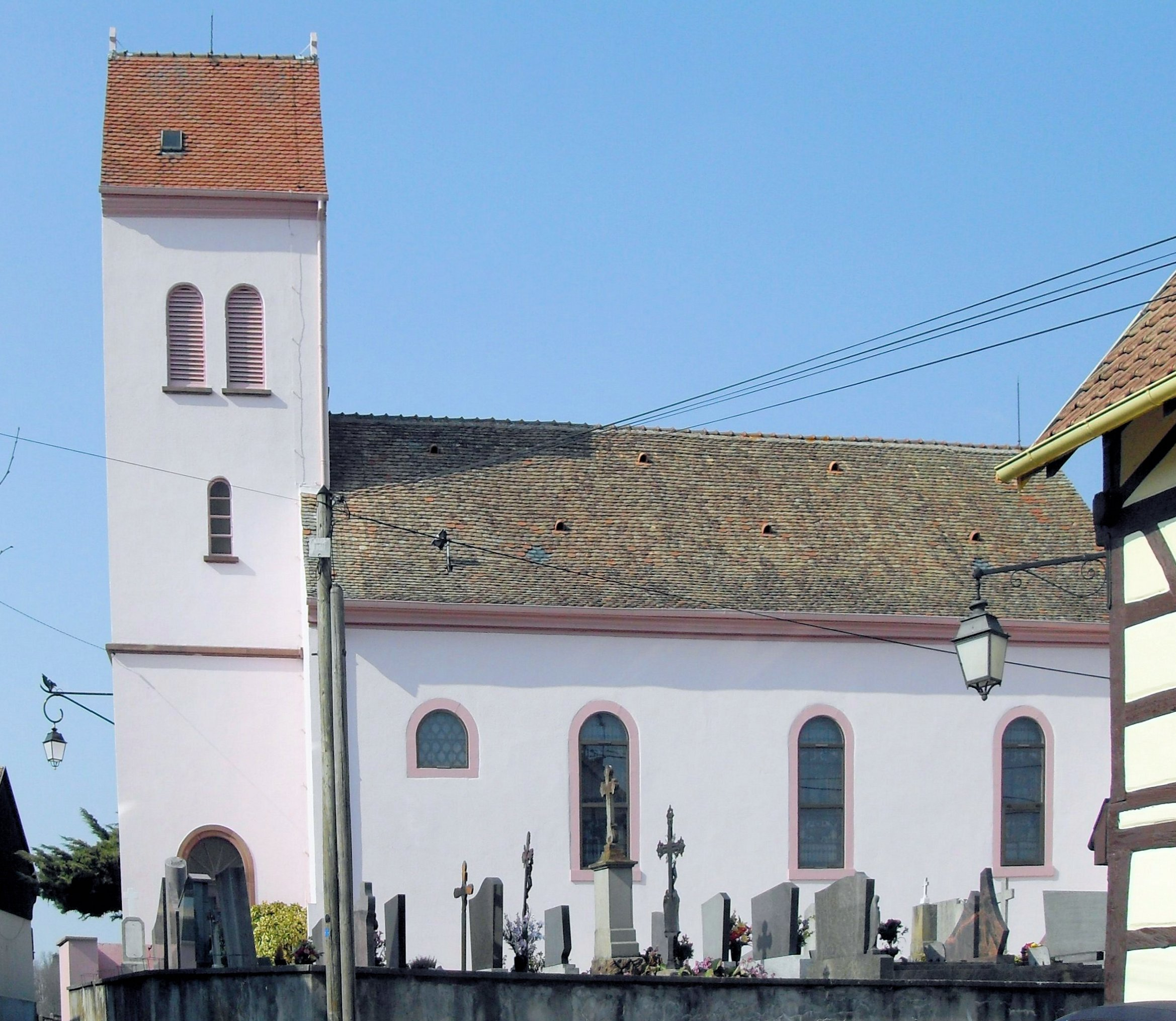
Saint Peter and Paul Church

== Population ==
Historical population
Year	Pop.	±% p.a.
1968	126	—
1975	173	+4.63%
1982	300	+8.18%
1990	357	+2.20%
1999	505	+3.93%
2007	561	+1.32%
2012	565	+0.14%
2017	532	−1.20%
2023	506	−0.83%
Source: INSEE

== See also ==
- Communes of the Haut-Rhin department
