= Michelbach-le-Bas =

Commune in Grand Est, France

- Commune
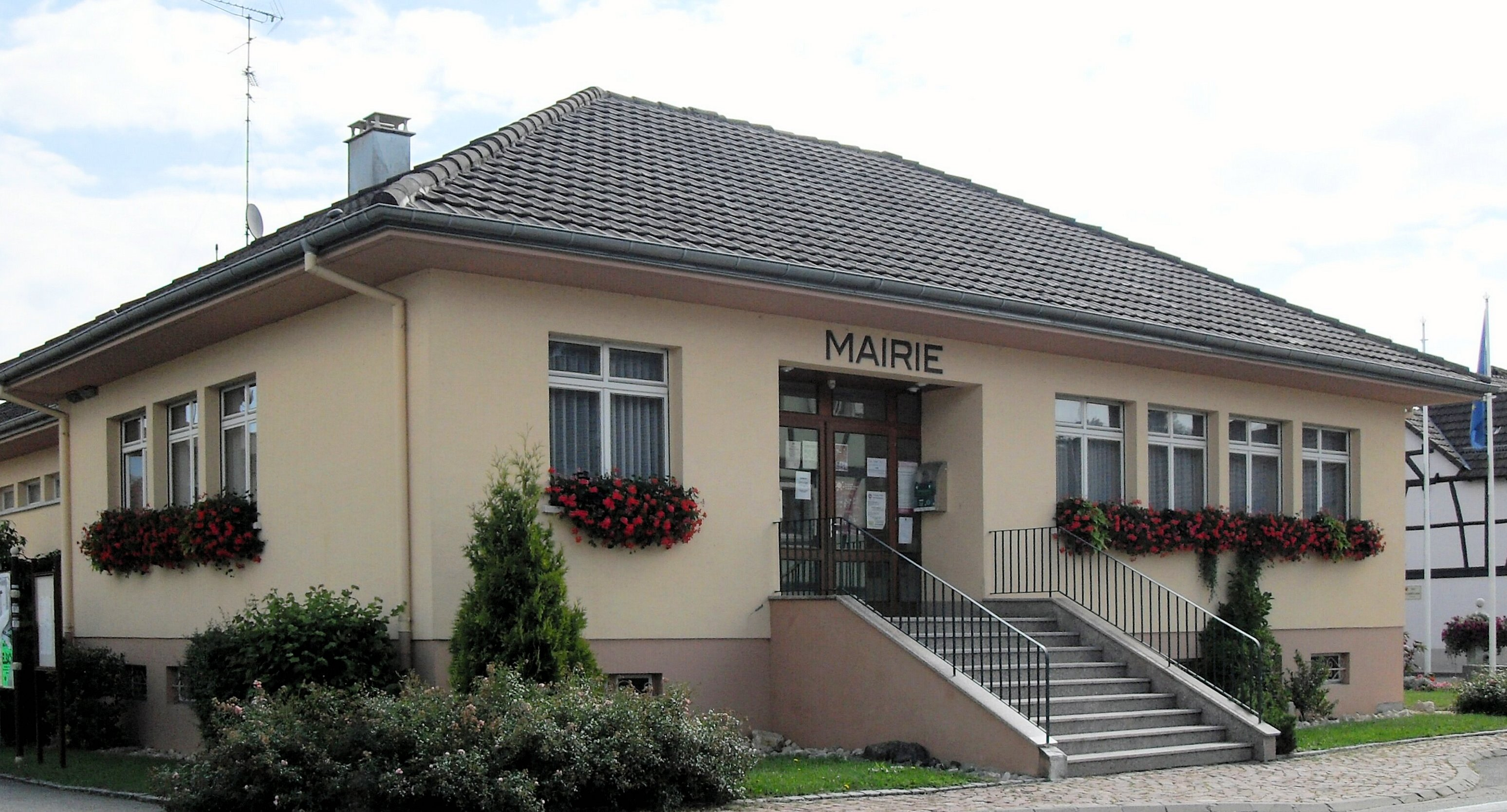
- The town hall in Michelbach-le-Bas

- Coat of arms
- Location of Michelbach-le-Bas
- Location within France Location within Grand Est
- Coordinates: 47°35′38″N 7°27′56″E
- Country: France
- Region: Grand Est
- Department: Haut-Rhin
- Arrondissement: Mulhouse
- Canton: Saint-Louis
- Intercommunality: Saint-Louis Agglomération

Government
  - Mayor (2020–2026): Julien Schicklin
- Area^{1}: 4.94 km^{2} (1.91 sq mi)
- Elevation: 305 m (1,001 ft)
- Highest elevation: 346 m (1,135 ft)
- Lowest elevation: 284 m (932 ft)
- Population (2023): 722
  - Density: 146/km^{2} (379/sq mi)
- Time zone: UTC+01:00 (CET)
  - Summer (DST): UTC+02:00 (CEST)
- INSEE/Postal code: 68207 /68730
- Website: michelbachlebas.fr
- ^{1} French Land Register data, which excludes lakes, ponds, glaciers > 1 km^{2} (0.386 sq mi or 247 acres) and river estuaries.

Michelbach-le-Bas (German: Niedermichelbach) is a commune in the Haut-Rhin department in Alsace in north-eastern France.

== See also ==
- Communes of the Haut-Rhin département
