= Brinckheim =

Commune in Grand Est, France

- Commune
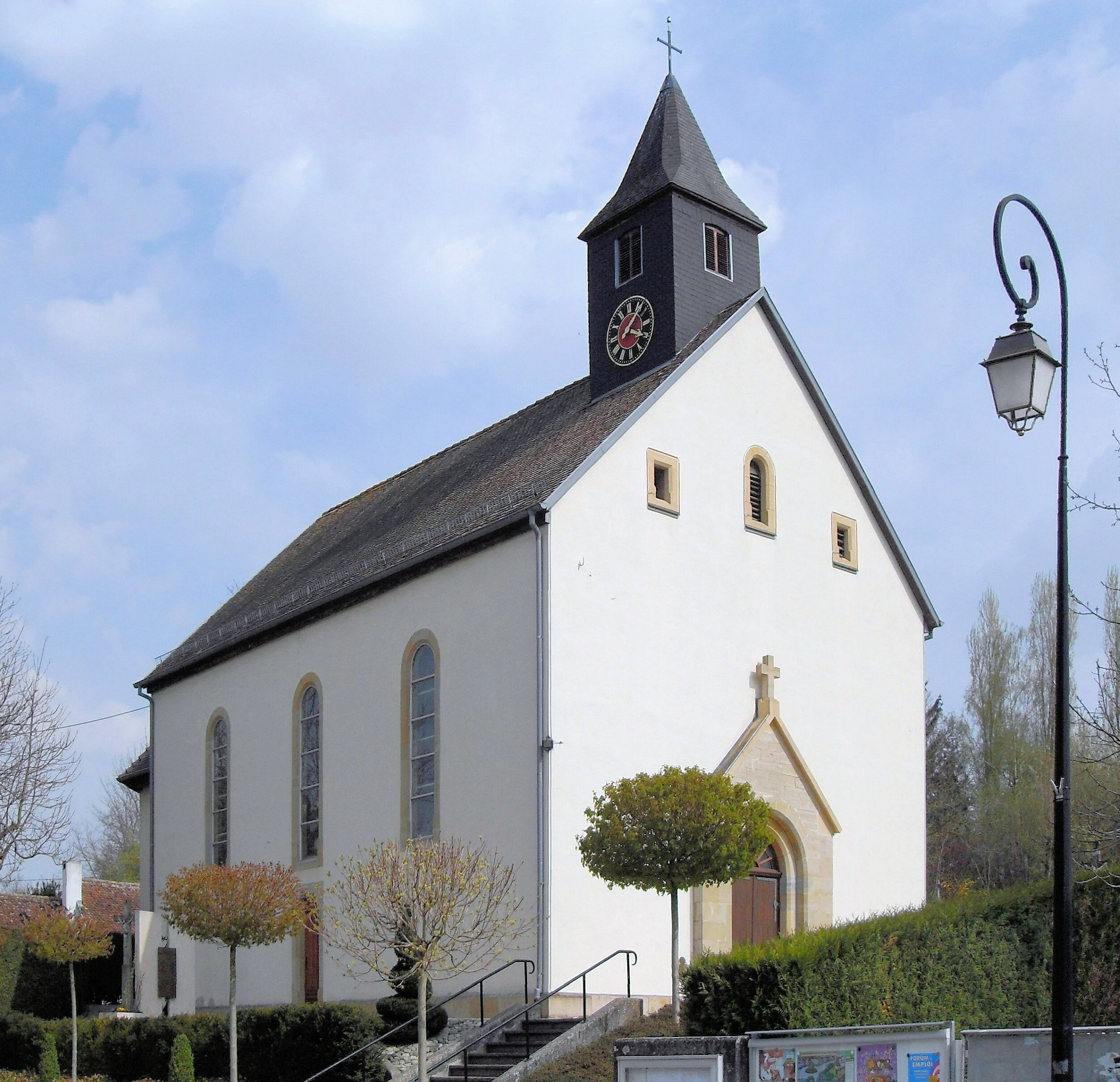
- The church in Brinckheim

- Coat of arms
- Location of Brinckheim
- Location within France Location within Grand Est
- Coordinates: 47°37′39″N 7°27′35″E
- Country: France
- Region: Grand Est
- Department: Haut-Rhin
- Arrondissement: Mulhouse
- Canton: Brunstatt-Didenheim
- Intercommunality: Saint-Louis Agglomération

Government
  - Mayor (2020–2026): Philippe Ginder
- Area^{1}: 3.41 km^{2} (1.32 sq mi)
- Elevation: 287 m (942 ft)
- Highest elevation: 322 m (1,056 ft)
- Lowest elevation: 277 m (909 ft)
- Population (2023): 402
  - Density: 118/km^{2} (305/sq mi)
- Time zone: UTC+01:00 (CET)
  - Summer (DST): UTC+02:00 (CEST)
- INSEE/Postal code: 68054 /68870
- ^{1} French Land Register data, which excludes lakes, ponds, glaciers > 1 km^{2} (0.386 sq mi or 247 acres) and river estuaries.

Brinckheim (French pronunciation: [bʁiŋkaim]; German: Brinkheim; Alsatian: Brínke) is a commune in the Haut-Rhin department in Alsace in north-eastern France.

== See also ==
- Communes of the Haut-Rhin department
