= Zaessingue =

Commune in Grand Est, France

Zaessingue Zäsige
- Commune
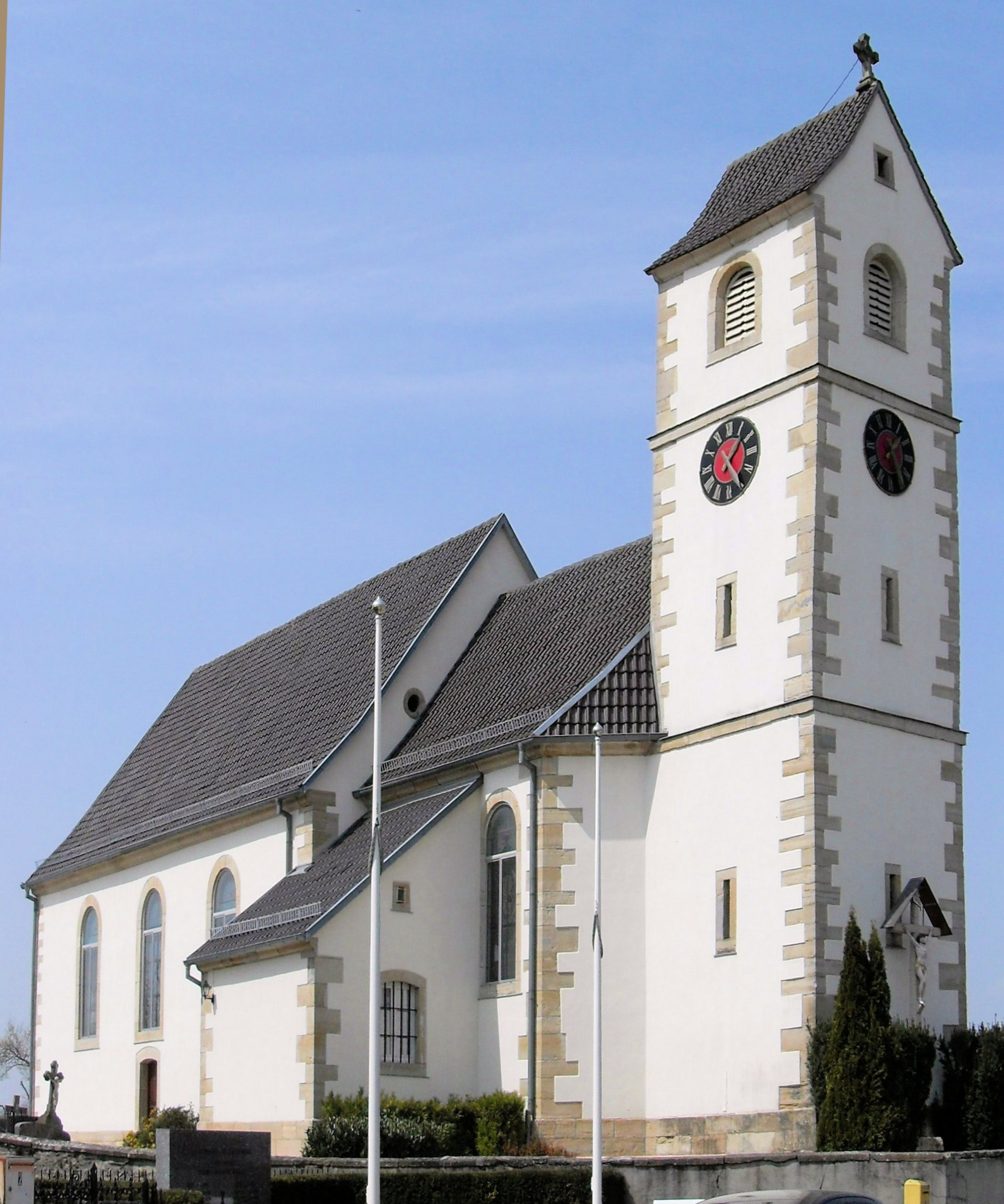
- St. Peter and Paul Church

- Coat of arms
- Location of Zaessingue
- Location within France Location within Grand Est
- Coordinates: 47°37′26″N 7°22′04″E
- Country: France
- Region: Grand Est
- Department: Haut-Rhin
- Arrondissement: Mulhouse
- Canton: Brunstatt-Didenheim
- Intercommunality: Saint-Louis Agglomération

Government
  - Mayor (2020–2026): Roger Zinniger
- Area^{1}: 4.99 km^{2} (1.93 sq mi)
- Elevation: 345 m (1,132 ft)
- Highest elevation: 412 m (1,352 ft)
- Lowest elevation: 338 m (1,109 ft)
- Population (2023): 375
  - Density: 75.2/km^{2} (195/sq mi)
- Demonym(s): Zaessinguois, Zaessinguoises
- Time zone: UTC+01:00 (CET)
  - Summer (DST): UTC+02:00 (CEST)
- INSEE/Postal code: 68382 /68130
- ^{1} French Land Register data, which excludes lakes, ponds, glaciers > 1 km^{2} (0.386 sq mi or 247 acres) and river estuaries.

Zaessingue (French pronunciation: [t͡sɛsɛ̃g]; Alemannic German: Zäsige; German: Zässingen) is a commune in the Haut-Rhin department in Alsace in north-eastern France.

== Population ==
Historical population

Year	Pop.	±% p.a.
1793	332	—
1821	390	+0.58%
1846	457	+0.64%
1871	449	−0.07%
1900	337	−0.98%
1926	230	−1.46%
1946	241	+0.23%
1962	199	−1.19%
1968	205	+0.50%

Year	Pop.	±% p.a.
1975	224	+1.27%
1982	240	+0.99%
1990	248	+0.41%
1999	257	+0.40%
2007	301	+2.00%
2012	344	+2.71%
2017	378	+1.90%
2023	375	−0.13%

Source: EHESS (1793-1999) and INSEE

== See also ==
- Communes of the Haut-Rhin department
