= Schlierbach, Haut-Rhin =

Commune in Grand Est, France

Schlierbach
- Commune
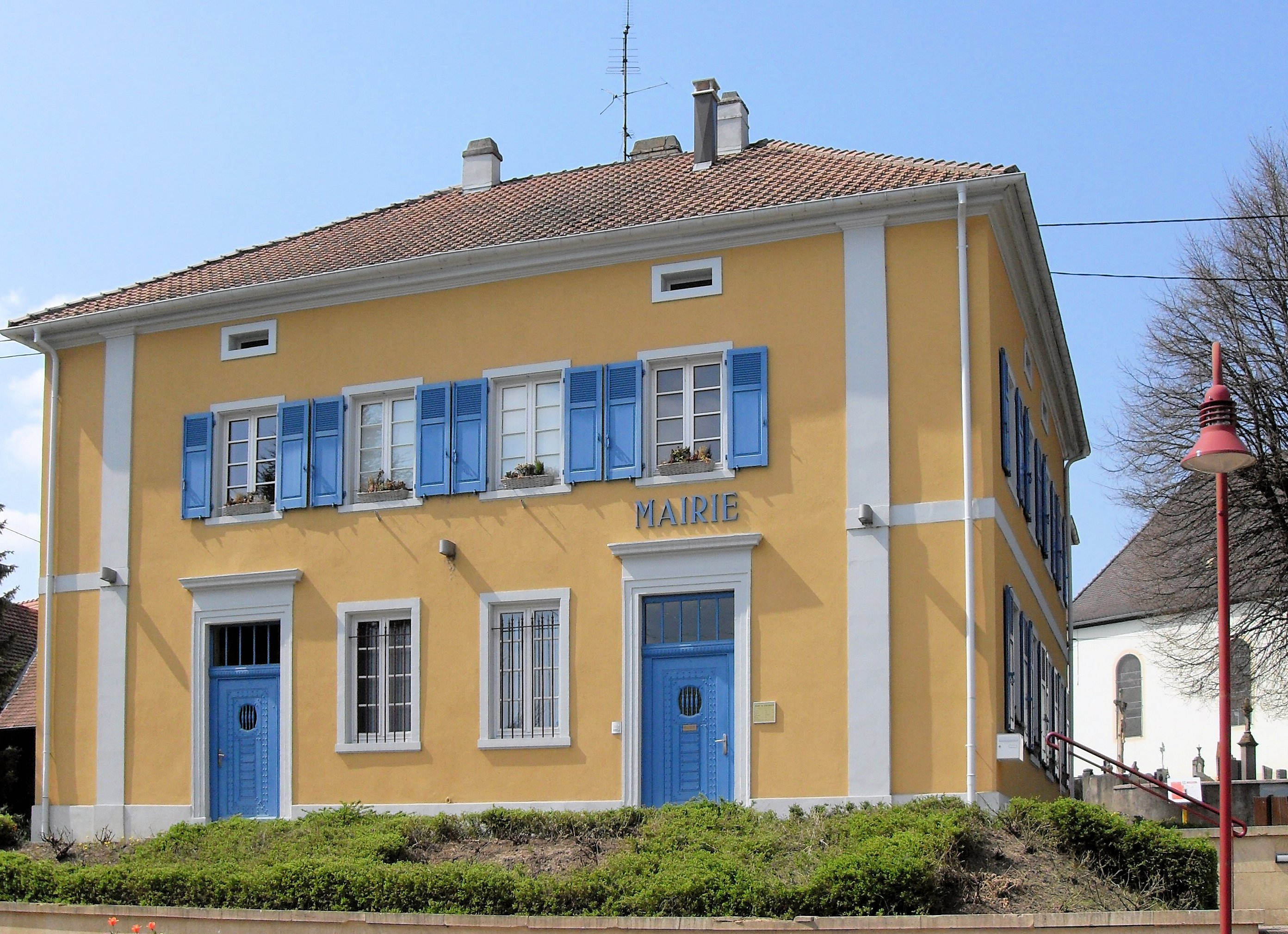
- The town hall in Schlierbach

- Coat of arms
- Location of Schlierbach
- Location within France Location within Grand Est
- Coordinates: 47°41′39″N 7°24′32″E
- Country: France
- Region: Grand Est
- Department: Haut-Rhin
- Arrondissement: Mulhouse
- Canton: Brunstatt-Didenheim
- Intercommunality: Saint-Louis Agglomération

Government
  - Mayor (2020–2026): Bernard Juchs
- Area^{1}: 11.8 km^{2} (4.6 sq mi)
- Elevation: 260 m (850 ft)
- Highest elevation: 346 m (1,135 ft)
- Lowest elevation: 244 m (801 ft)
- Population (2023): 1,299
  - Density: 110/km^{2} (285/sq mi)
- Time zone: UTC+01:00 (CET)
  - Summer (DST): UTC+02:00 (CEST)
- INSEE/Postal code: 68301 /68440
- ^{1} French Land Register data, which excludes lakes, ponds, glaciers > 1 km^{2} (0.386 sq mi or 247 acres) and river estuaries.

Schlierbach is a commune in the Haut-Rhin department in Alsace in north-eastern France.

== See also ==
- Communes of the Haut-Rhin department
