= Magstatt-le-Haut =

Commune in Grand Est, France

Magstatt-le-Haut Obermàschgetz
- Commune
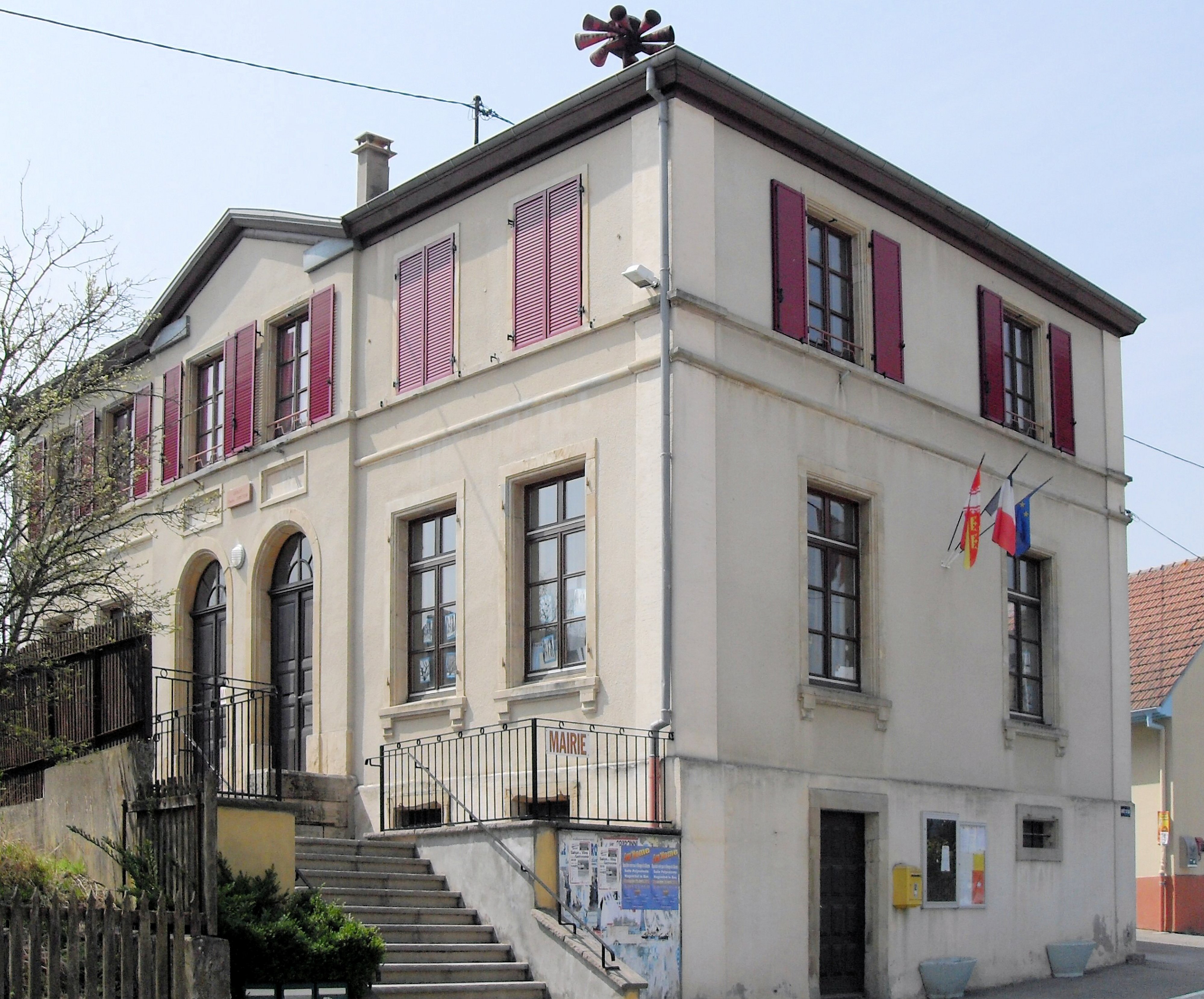
- The town hall in Magstatt-le-Haut

- Coat of arms
- Location of Magstatt-le-Haut
- Location within France Location within Grand Est
- Coordinates: 47°38′00″N 7°23′46″E
- Country: France
- Region: Grand Est
- Department: Haut-Rhin
- Arrondissement: Mulhouse
- Canton: Brunstatt-Didenheim
- Intercommunality: Saint-Louis Agglomération

Government
  - Mayor (2020–2026): Florence Heitz
- Area^{1}: 3.91 km^{2} (1.51 sq mi)
- Elevation: 330 m (1,080 ft)
- Highest elevation: 406 m (1,332 ft)
- Lowest elevation: 309 m (1,014 ft)
- Population (2023): 315
  - Density: 80.6/km^{2} (209/sq mi)
- Time zone: UTC+01:00 (CET)
  - Summer (DST): UTC+02:00 (CEST)
- INSEE/Postal code: 68198 /68510
- ^{1} French Land Register data, which excludes lakes, ponds, glaciers > 1 km^{2} (0.386 sq mi or 247 acres) and river estuaries.

Magstatt-le-Haut (Alemannic German: Obermàschgetz; German: Obermagstatt) is a commune in Haut-Rhin, a department in Alsace in north-eastern France.

== See also ==
- Communes of the Haut-Rhin département
- Magstatt-le-Bas
