= Kappelen, Haut-Rhin =

Commune in Grand Est, France

Kappelen Chàppala
- Commune
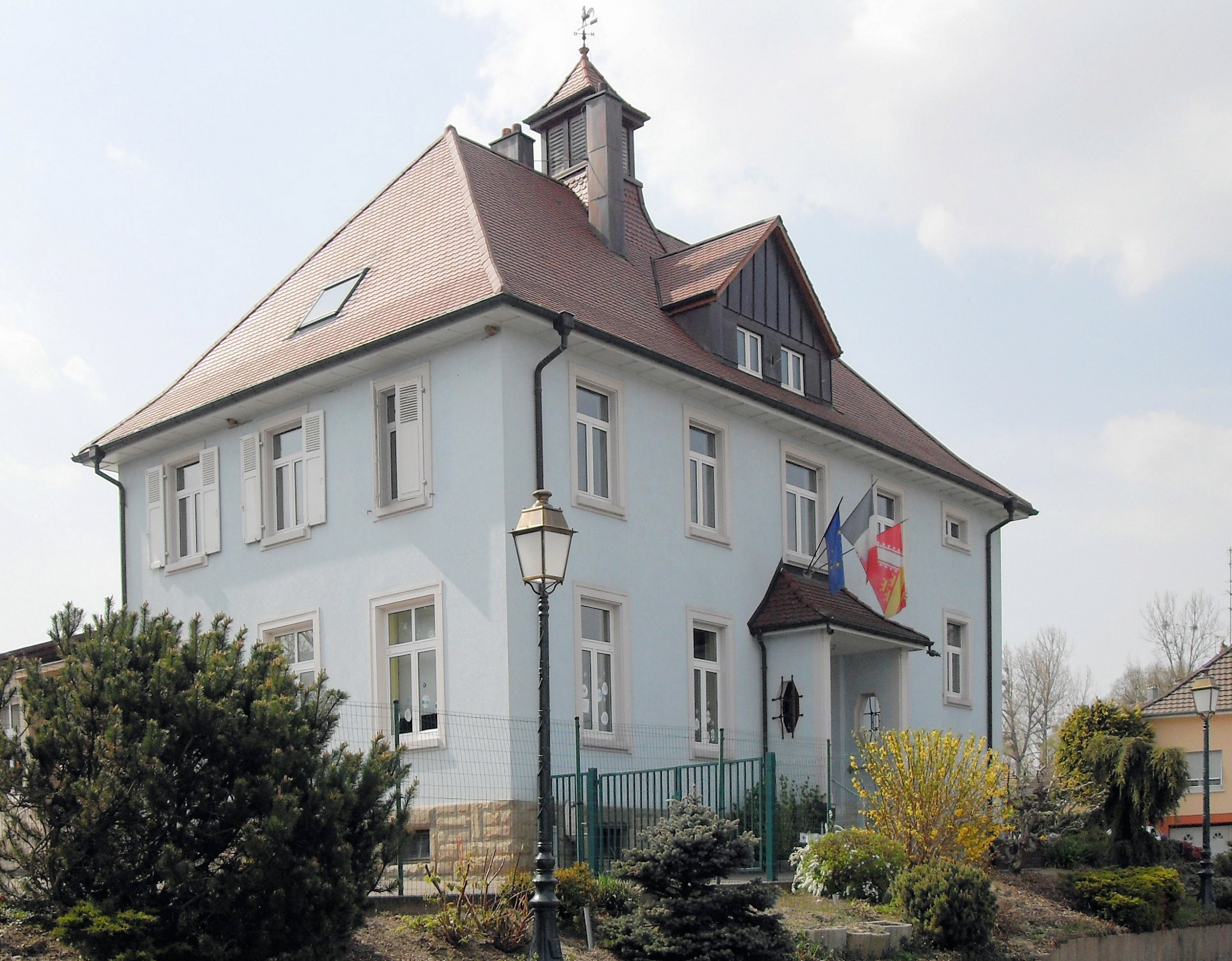
- The town hall and school of Kappelen

- Coat of arms
- Location of Kappelen
- Location within France Location within Grand Est
- Coordinates: 47°37′09″N 7°26′19″E
- Country: France
- Region: Grand Est
- Department: Haut-Rhin
- Arrondissement: Mulhouse
- Canton: Brunstatt-Didenheim
- Intercommunality: Saint-Louis Agglomération

Government
  - Mayor (2020–2026): Guillaume Gabriel
- Area^{1}: 5.15 km^{2} (1.99 sq mi)
- Elevation: 325 m (1,066 ft)
- Highest elevation: 1,371 m (4,498 ft)
- Lowest elevation: 996 m (3,268 ft)
- Population (2023): 573
  - Density: 111/km^{2} (288/sq mi)
- Time zone: UTC+01:00 (CET)
  - Summer (DST): UTC+02:00 (CEST)
- INSEE/Postal code: 68160 /68510
- ^{1} French Land Register data, which excludes lakes, ponds, glaciers > 1 km^{2} (0.386 sq mi or 247 acres) and river estuaries.

Kappelen (pronounced [kapɛlɛn]; Alsatian: Chàppala pronounced [ˈxɔpala]) is a commune in the Haut-Rhin department in Alsace in north-eastern France.

== Population ==
Historical population
Year	Pop.	±% p.a.
1968	290	—
1975	324	+1.60%
1982	369	+1.88%
1990	412	+1.39%
1999	499	+2.15%
2007	511	+0.30%
2012	552	+1.56%
2017	587	+1.24%
2023	573	−0.40%
Source: INSEE

== See also ==
- Communes of the Haut-Rhin département
