= Saint-Louis Agglomération =

- Communauté d'agglomération
- Interactive map of Saint-Louis Agglomération
- Coordinates: 47°35′N 07°30′E
- Country: France
- Region: Grand Est
- Department: Haut-Rhin
- No. of communes: {{{nbcomm}}}
- Established: 2017
- Area: 268.0 km^{2} (103.5 sq mi)
- Population (2019): 81,696
  - Density: 304.8/km^{2} (789.5/sq mi)
- Website: www.agglo-saint-louis.fr

Saint-Louis Agglomération is the communauté d'agglomération, an intercommunal structure, centred on the town of Saint-Louis. It is located in the Haut-Rhin department, in the Grand Est region, northeastern France. Created in 2017, its seat is in Saint-Louis. Its area is 268.0 km^{2}. Its population was 81,696 in 2019, of which 22,413 in Saint-Louis proper.

== Composition ==
The communauté d'agglomération consists of the following 40 communes:

1. Attenschwiller
2. Bartenheim
3. Blotzheim
4. Brinckheim
5. Buschwiller
6. Folgensbourg
7. Geispitzen
8. Hagenthal-le-Bas
9. Hagenthal-le-Haut
10. Hégenheim
11. Helfrantzkirch
12. Hésingue
13. Huningue
14. Kappelen
15. Kembs
16. Knœringue
17. Kœtzingue
18. Landser
19. Leymen
20. Liebenswiller
21. Magstatt-le-Bas
22. Magstatt-le-Haut
23. Michelbach-le-Bas
24. Michelbach-le-Haut
25. Neuwiller
26. Ranspach-le-Bas
27. Ranspach-le-Haut
28. Rantzwiller
29. Rosenau
30. Saint-Louis
31. Schlierbach
32. Sierentz
33. Steinbrunn-le-Haut
34. Stetten
35. Uffheim
36. Village-Neuf
37. Wahlbach
38. Waltenheim
39. Wentzwiller
40. Zaessingue
