= Canton of Brunstatt-Didenheim =

Canton of France

Coordinates: 47.72°N 7.32°E

The canton of Brunstatt-Didenheim (before 2021: Brunstatt) is an administrative division of the Haut-Rhin department, northeastern France. It was created at the French canton reorganisation which came into effect in March 2015. Its seat is in Brunstatt-Didenheim.

It consists of the following communes:

- Bartenheim
- Brinckheim
- Bruebach
- Brunstatt-Didenheim
- Dietwiller
- Eschentzwiller
- Flaxlanden
- Geispitzen
- Helfrantzkirch
- Kappelen
- Kembs
- Kœtzingue
- Landser
- Magstatt-le-Bas
- Magstatt-le-Haut
- Rantzwiller
- Schlierbach
- Sierentz
- Steinbrunn-le-Bas
- Steinbrunn-le-Haut
- Stetten
- Uffheim
- Wahlbach
- Waltenheim
- Zaessingue
- Zillisheim
- Zimmersheim
