= Steinbrunn-le-Bas =

Commune in Grand Est, France

- Commune
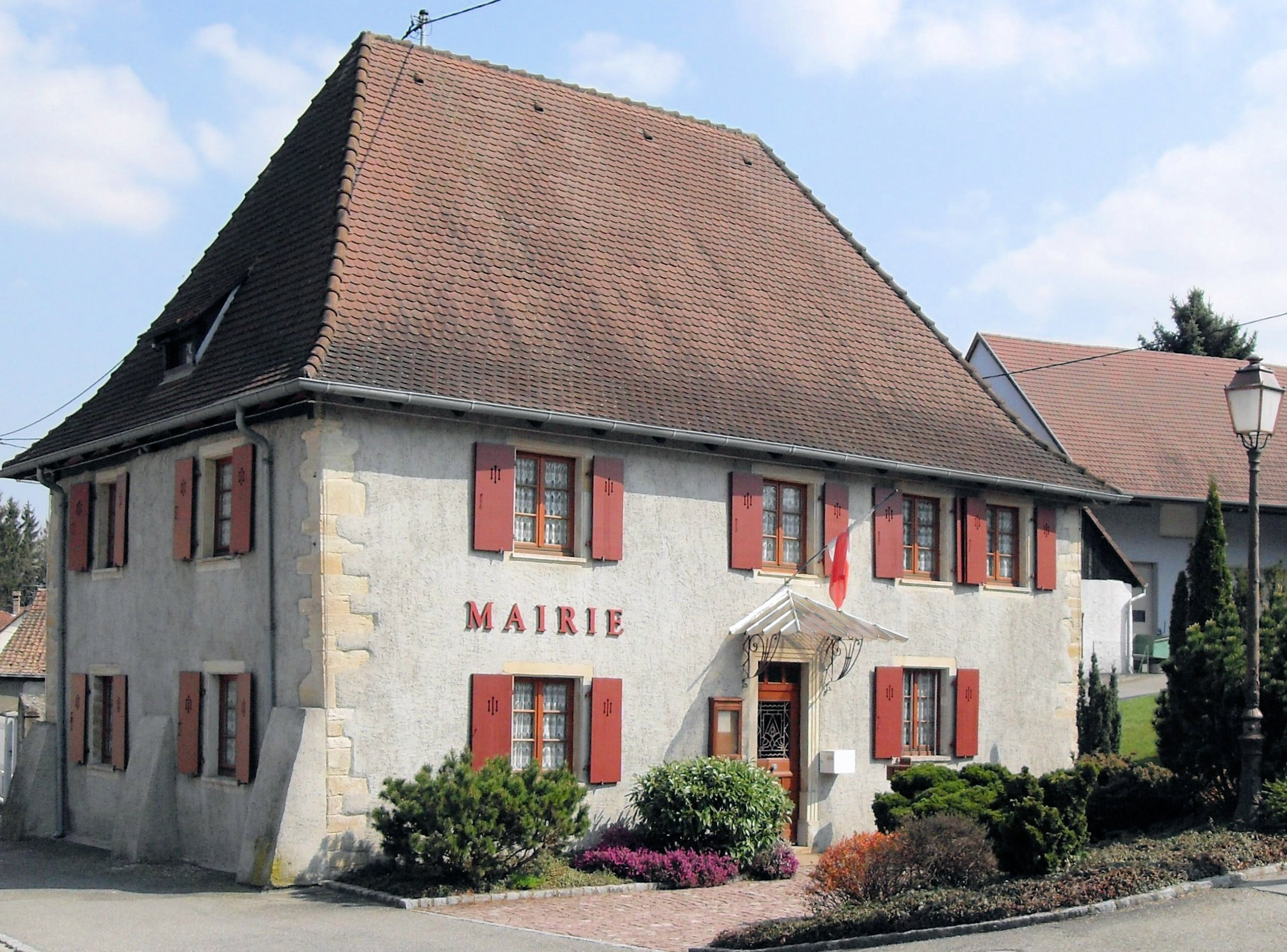
- Town Hall

- Coat of arms
- Location of Steinbrunn-le-Bas
- Location within France Location within Grand Est
- Coordinates: 47°40′36″N 7°22′04″E
- Country: France
- Region: Grand Est
- Department: Haut-Rhin
- Arrondissement: Mulhouse
- Canton: Brunstatt-Didenheim
- Intercommunality: CA Mulhouse Alsace Agglomération

Government
  - Mayor (2020–2026): Daniel Hassler
- Area^{1}: 8.58 km^{2} (3.31 sq mi)
- Elevation: 275 m (902 ft)
- Highest elevation: 403 m (1,322 ft)
- Lowest elevation: 257 m (843 ft)
- Population (2023): 848
  - Density: 98.8/km^{2} (256/sq mi)
- Time zone: UTC+01:00 (CET)
  - Summer (DST): UTC+02:00 (CEST)
- INSEE/Postal code: 68323 /68440
- ^{1} French Land Register data, which excludes lakes, ponds, glaciers > 1 km^{2} (0.386 sq mi or 247 acres) and river estuaries.

Steinbrunn-le-Bas (German: Niedersteinbrunn) is a commune in the urban area of Mulhouse located in north-eastern France.

Its inhabitants are called Steinbrunnois and Steinbrunnoises.

== Toponymy ==
- Steinebrun in 823

- Steinebronnen inferius, 1028

Etymologically, Steinbrunn means the source of the stone. The town owes its name to a nearby spring Taufsteinbrunn whose name is "the source of the baptismal font."

There was an old manor house, called Schlössel which had the right to tithes and a chapel known as the name Apollonia St., near which there was a source of water and where there are Roman brick remains. This chapel is dedicated to St. Appoline. One might assume that before the region was Christianised, the site was dedicated to Apollo. This town, once much larger, was, before the Reformation, divided into two parishes. The location of the church of Saint Léger is also known under the name of Kirchhof.

== See also ==
- Communes of the Haut-Rhin department
