= Liebenswiller =

Commune in Grand Est, France

Liebenswiller Liebedswìller
- Commune
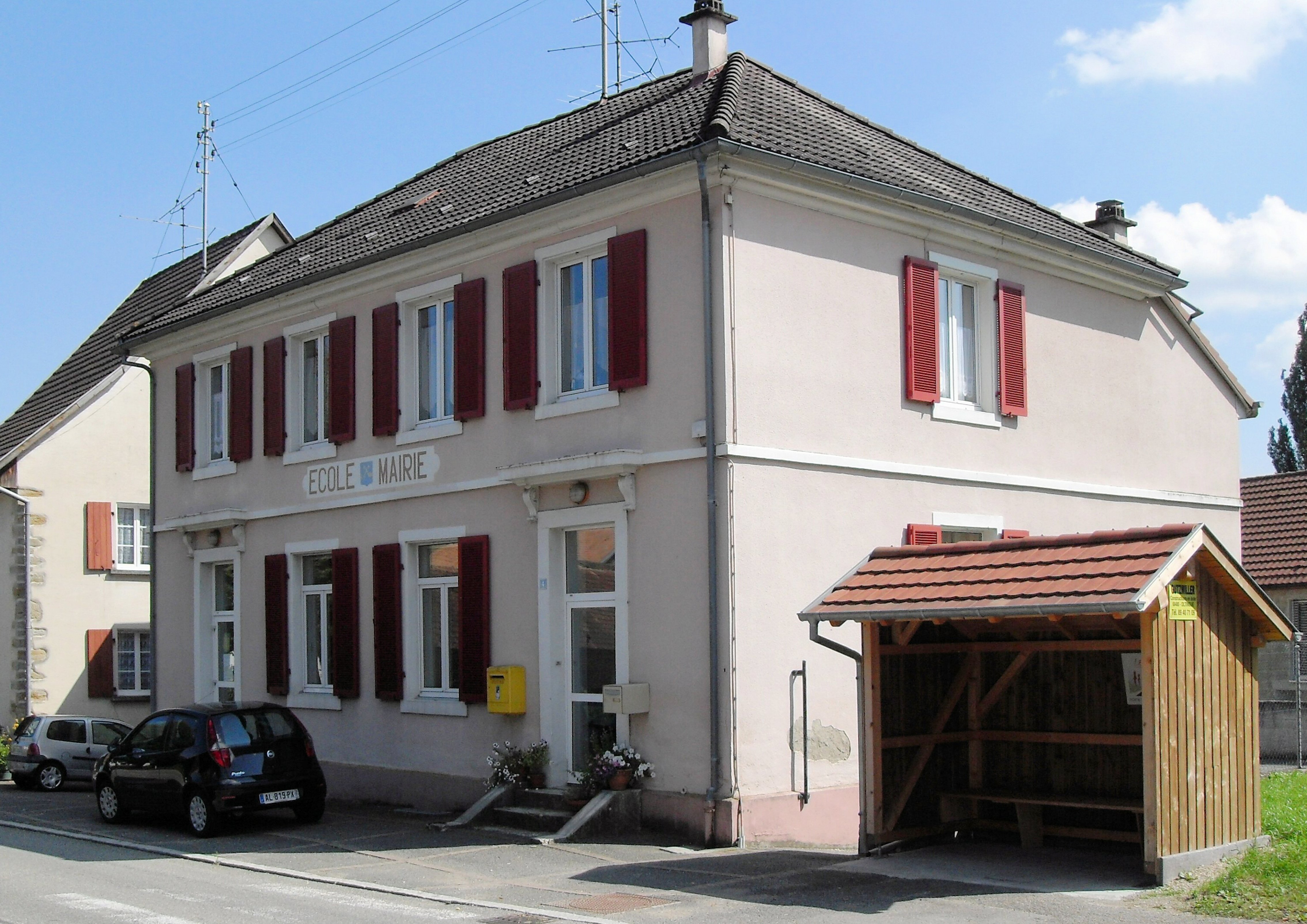
- The town hall and school in Liebenswiller

- Coat of arms
- Location of Liebenswiller
- Location within France Location within Grand Est
- Coordinates: 47°29′56″N 7°27′21″E
- Country: France
- Region: Grand Est
- Department: Haut-Rhin
- Arrondissement: Mulhouse
- Canton: Saint-Louis
- Intercommunality: Saint-Louis Agglomération

Government
  - Mayor (2020–2026): Hubert Muller
- Area^{1}: 3.87 km^{2} (1.49 sq mi)
- Elevation: 370 m (1,210 ft)
- Highest elevation: 529 m (1,736 ft)
- Lowest elevation: 349 m (1,145 ft)
- Population (2023): 191
  - Density: 49.4/km^{2} (128/sq mi)
- Time zone: UTC+01:00 (CET)
  - Summer (DST): UTC+02:00 (CEST)
- INSEE/Postal code: 68183 /68220
- ^{1} French Land Register data, which excludes lakes, ponds, glaciers > 1 km^{2} (0.386 sq mi or 247 acres) and river estuaries.

Liebenswiller (French pronunciation: [libənsvilɛʁ]; Alemannic German: Liebedswìller; German: Liebensweiler) is a commune in the Haut-Rhin department in Alsace in north-eastern France. It is located close to the border with Switzerland, near the Swiss village of Rodersdorf.

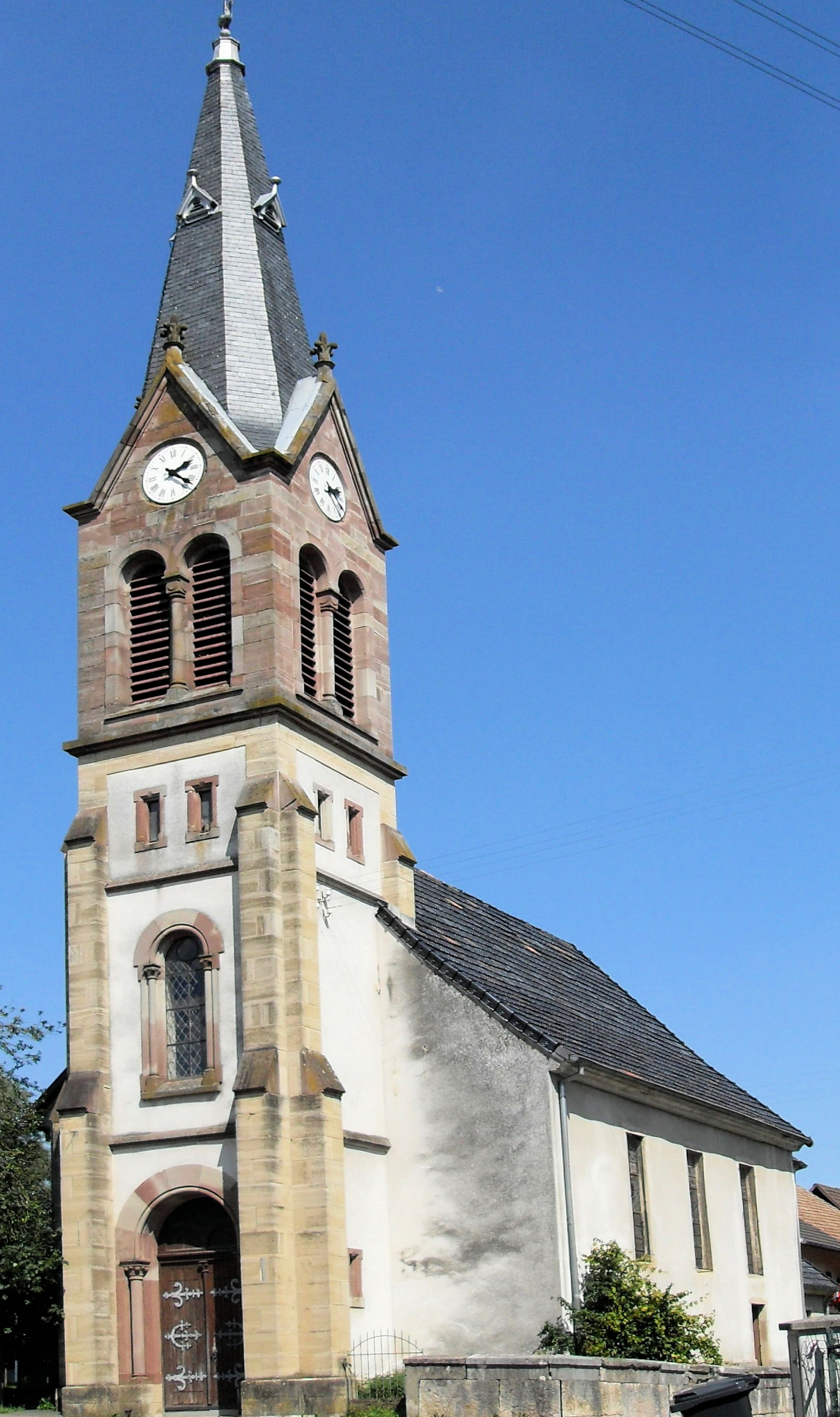
Saint Marcus Church

== See also ==
- Communes of the Haut-Rhin département
