= Rantzwiller =

Commune in Grand Est, France

- Commune
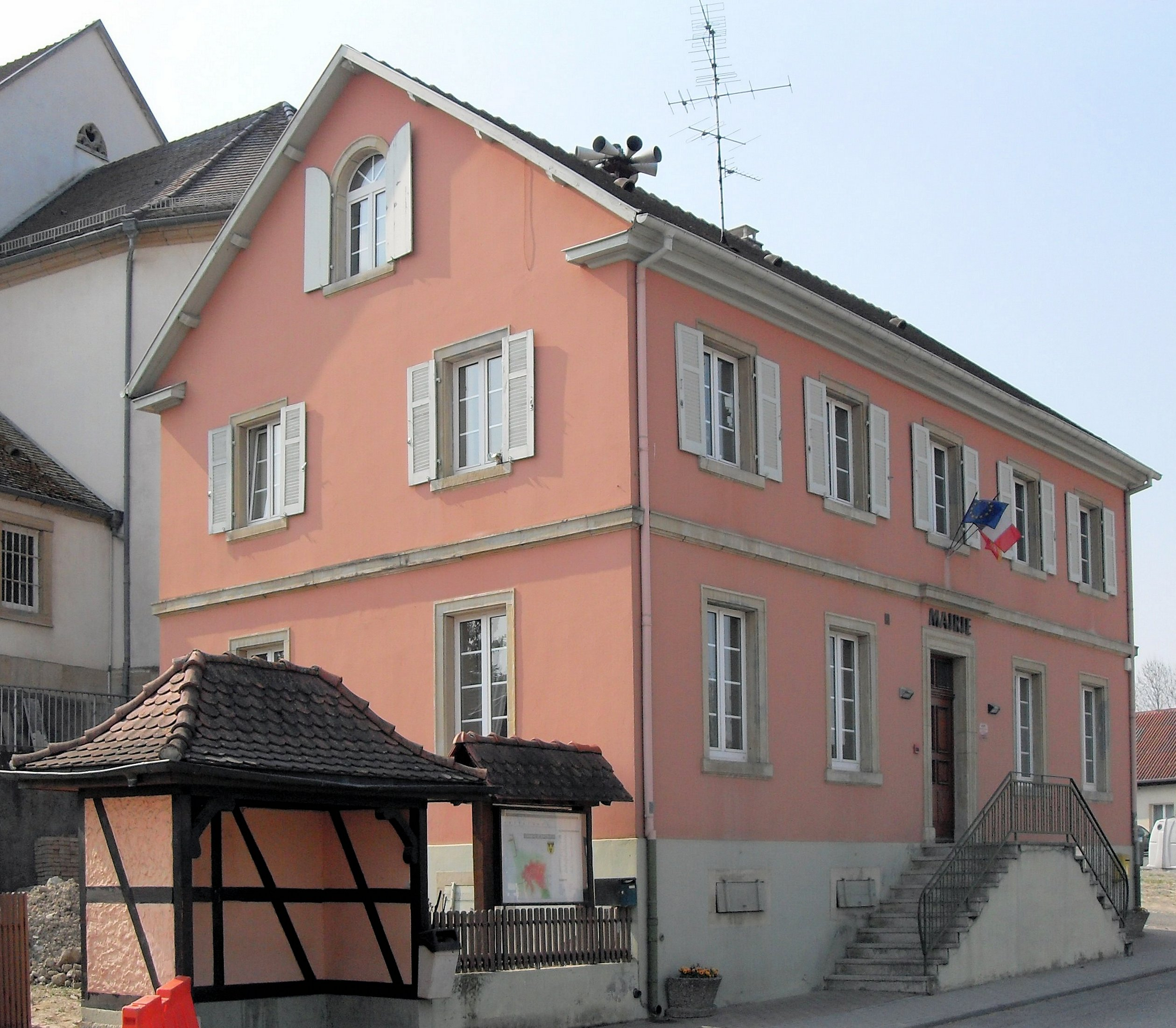
- The town hall in Rantzwiller

- Coat of arms
- Location of Rantzwiller
- Location within France Location within Grand Est
- Coordinates: 47°39′08″N 7°22′39″E
- Country: France
- Region: Grand Est
- Department: Haut-Rhin
- Arrondissement: Mulhouse
- Canton: Brunstatt-Didenheim
- Intercommunality: Saint-Louis Agglomération

Government
  - Mayor (2020–2026): Clément Sibold
- Area^{1}: 5.47 km^{2} (2.11 sq mi)
- Elevation: 300 m (980 ft)
- Highest elevation: 358 m (1,175 ft)
- Lowest elevation: 292 m (958 ft)
- Population (2023): 802
  - Density: 147/km^{2} (380/sq mi)
- Time zone: UTC+01:00 (CET)
  - Summer (DST): UTC+02:00 (CEST)
- INSEE/Postal code: 68265 /68510
- ^{1} French Land Register data, which excludes lakes, ponds, glaciers > 1 km^{2} (0.386 sq mi or 247 acres) and river estuaries.

Rantzwiller (German: Rantsweiler) is a commune in the Haut-Rhin department in Alsace in north-eastern France.

== See also ==
- Communes of the Haut-Rhin department
