= Hagenthal-le-Haut =

Commune in Grand Est, France

- Commune
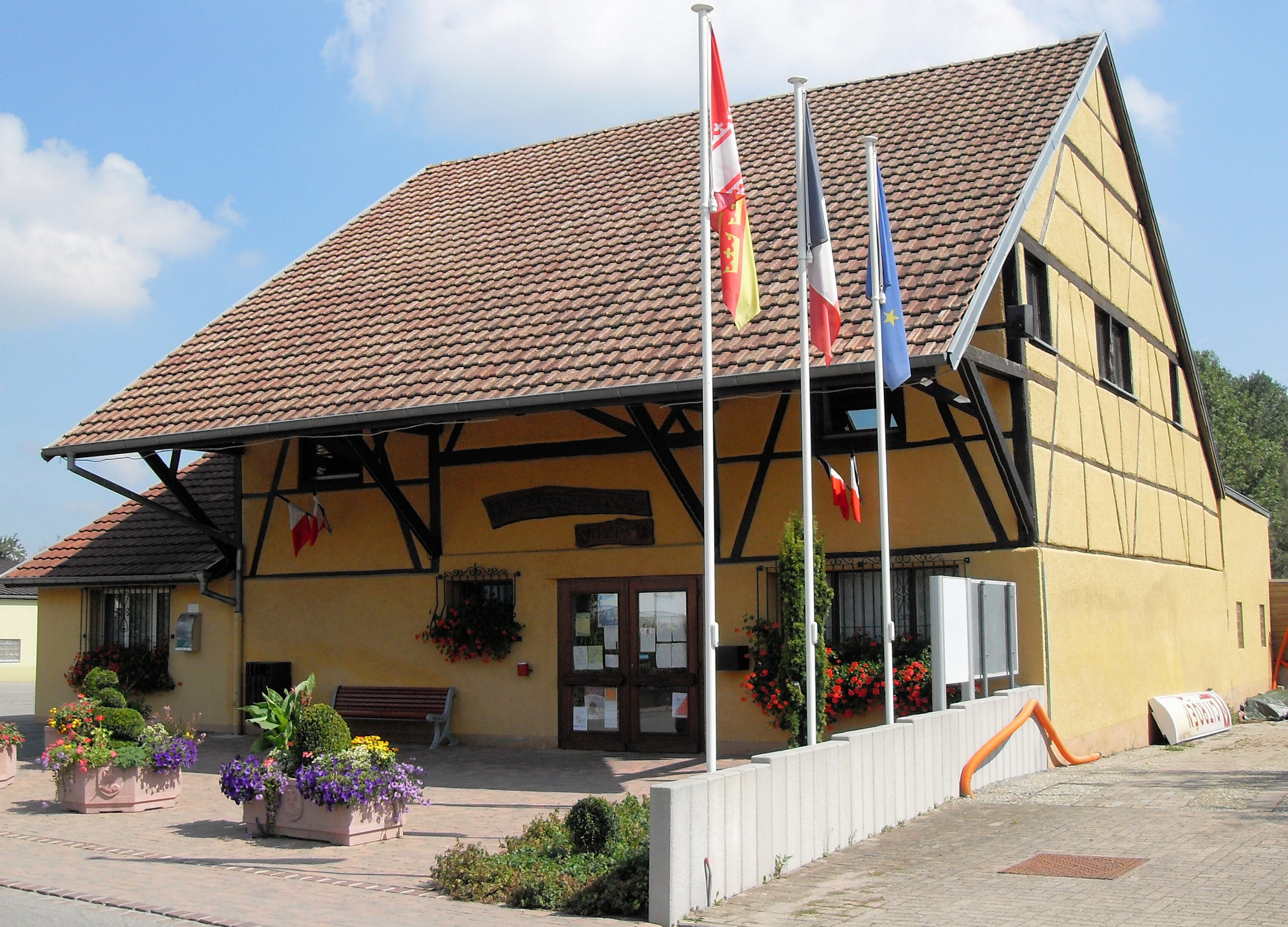
- The town hall in Hagenthal-le-Haut

- Coat of arms
- Location of Hagenthal-le-Haut
- Location within France Location within Grand Est
- Coordinates: 47°31′13″N 7°28′07″E
- Country: France
- Region: Grand Est
- Department: Haut-Rhin
- Arrondissement: Mulhouse
- Canton: Saint-Louis
- Intercommunality: Saint-Louis Agglomération

Government
  - Mayor (2020–2026): Pierre Pfendler
- Area^{1}: 4.92 km^{2} (1.90 sq mi)
- Highest elevation: 529 m (1,736 ft)
- Lowest elevation: 360 m (1,180 ft)
- Population (2023): 766
  - Density: 156/km^{2} (403/sq mi)
- Time zone: UTC+01:00 (CET)
  - Summer (DST): UTC+02:00 (CEST)
- INSEE/Postal code: 68121 /68220
- ^{1} French Land Register data, which excludes lakes, ponds, glaciers > 1 km^{2} (0.386 sq mi or 247 acres) and river estuaries.

Hagenthal-le-Haut (French pronunciation: [agəntal lə o]; German: Oberhagenthal) is a commune in the Haut-Rhin department in Alsace in north-eastern France.

== See also ==
- Communes of the Haut-Rhin département
