= Wahlbach, Haut-Rhin =

Commune in Grand Est, France

Wahlbach Wàhlbi
- Commune
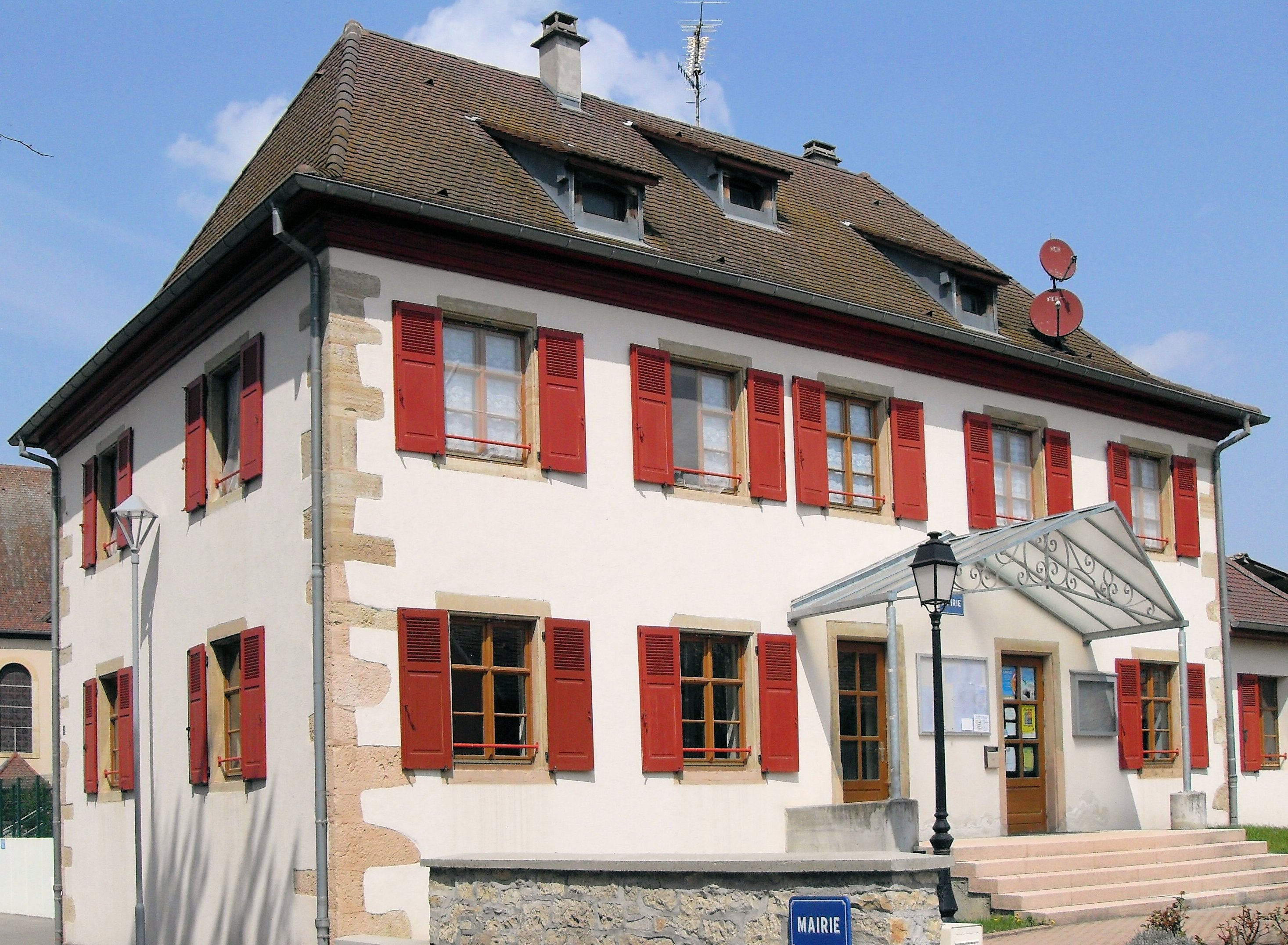
- The town hall in Wahlbach

- Coat of arms
- Location of Wahlbach
- Location within France Location within Grand Est
- Coordinates: 47°37′55″N 7°20′51″E
- Country: France
- Region: Grand Est
- Department: Haut-Rhin
- Arrondissement: Mulhouse
- Canton: Brunstatt-Didenheim
- Intercommunality: Saint-Louis Agglomération

Government
  - Mayor (2020–2026): Anthony Martin
- Area^{1}: 6.41 km^{2} (2.47 sq mi)
- Elevation: 320 m (1,050 ft)
- Highest elevation: 390 m (1,280 ft)
- Lowest elevation: 314 m (1,030 ft)
- Population (2023): 508
  - Density: 79.3/km^{2} (205/sq mi)
- Time zone: UTC+01:00 (CET)
  - Summer (DST): UTC+02:00 (CEST)
- INSEE/Postal code: 68353 /68130
- ^{1} French Land Register data, which excludes lakes, ponds, glaciers > 1 km^{2} (0.386 sq mi or 247 acres) and river estuaries.

Wahlbach (Alemannic German: Wàhlbi) is a commune in the Haut-Rhin department in Alsace in north-eastern France.

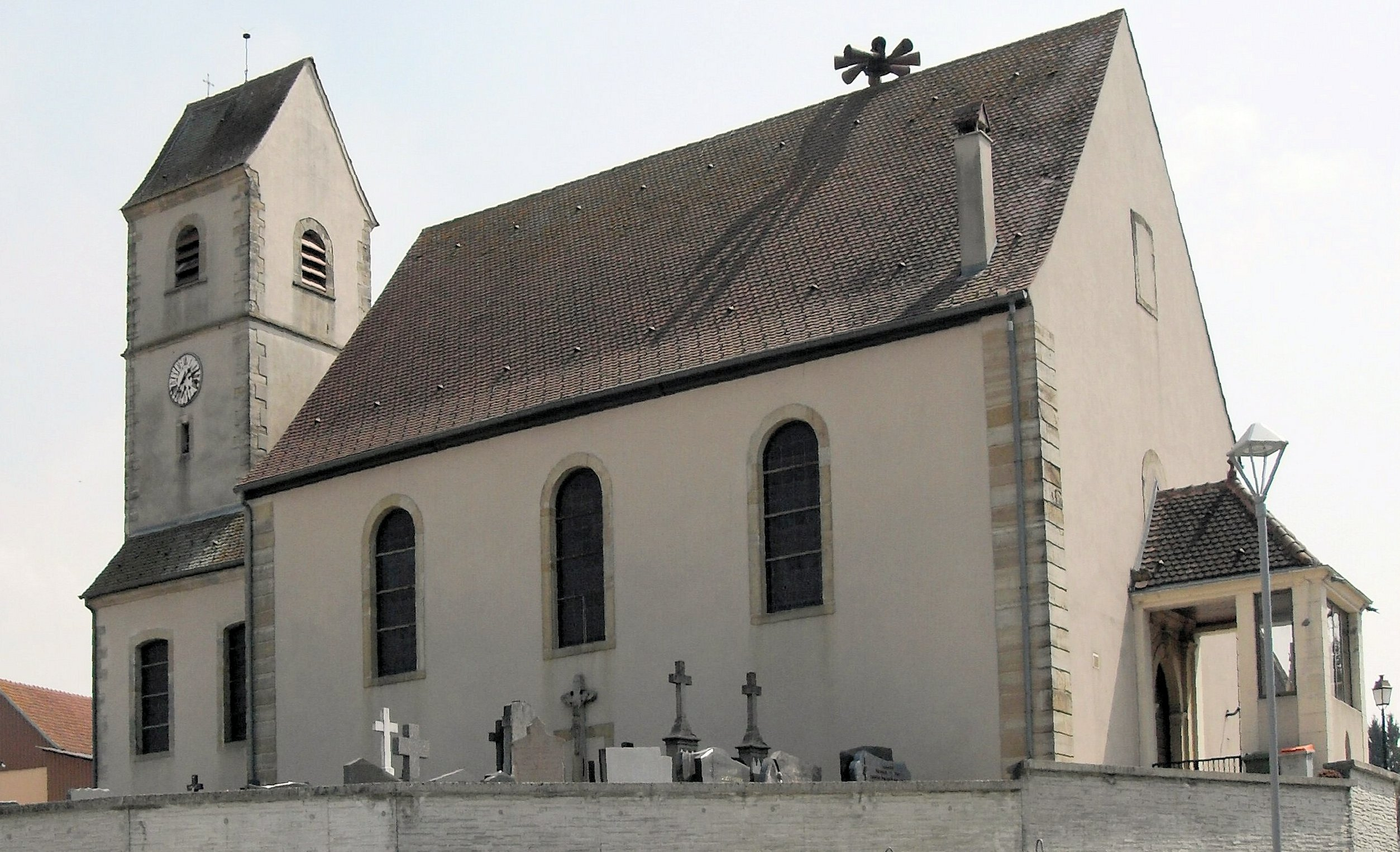
Saint Maurice and Saint Lawrence Church

== Population ==
Historical population
Year	Pop.	±% p.a.
1968	205	—
1975	189	−1.15%
1982	211	+1.59%
1990	242	+1.73%
1999	323	+3.26%
2007	413	+3.12%
2012	492	+3.56%
2017	497	+0.20%
2023	508	+0.37%
Source: INSEE

== See also ==
- Communes of the Haut-Rhin department
