= Wentzwiller =

Commune in Grand Est, France

- Commune
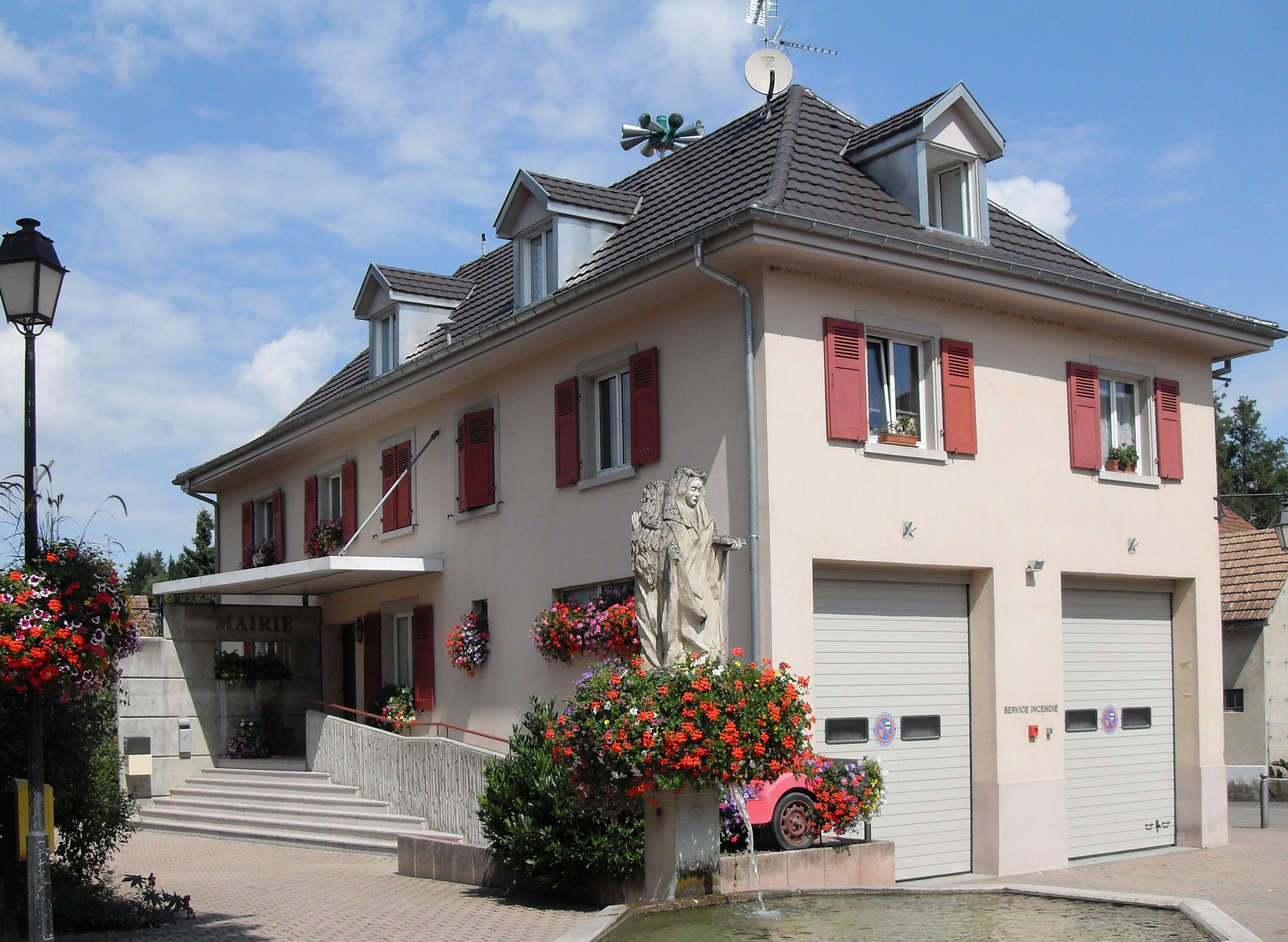
- The town hall in Wentzwiller

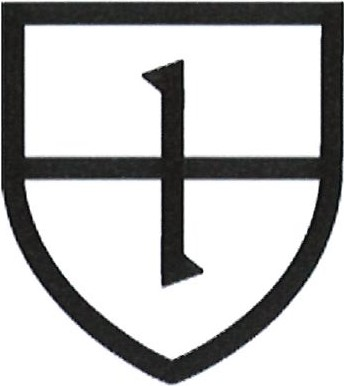
- Coat of arms
- Location of Wentzwiller
- Location within France Location within Grand Est
- Coordinates: 47°33′04″N 7°28′50″E
- Country: France
- Region: Grand Est
- Department: Haut-Rhin
- Arrondissement: Mulhouse
- Canton: Saint-Louis
- Intercommunality: Saint-Louis Agglomération

Government
  - Mayor (2020–2026): Angelo Pilleri
- Area^{1}: 4.71 km^{2} (1.82 sq mi)
- Elevation: 335 m (1,099 ft)
- Highest elevation: 418 m (1,371 ft)
- Lowest elevation: 328 m (1,076 ft)
- Population (2023): 780
  - Density: 170/km^{2} (430/sq mi)
- Time zone: UTC+01:00 (CET)
  - Summer (DST): UTC+02:00 (CEST)
- INSEE/Postal code: 68362 /68220
- Website: www.wentzwiller.fr
- ^{1} French Land Register data, which excludes lakes, ponds, glaciers > 1 km^{2} (0.386 sq mi or 247 acres) and river estuaries.

Wentzwiller (French pronunciation: [vɛntswilɛʁ]; German: Wenzweiler; Alsatian: Wànzwiller) is a commune in the Haut-Rhin department in Alsace in north-eastern France.

== Population ==
Historical population
Year	Pop.	±% p.a.
1968	417	—
1975	530	+3.48%
1982	566	+0.94%
1990	529	−0.84%
1999	554	+0.51%
2007	696	+2.89%
2012	696	+0.00%
2017	756	+1.67%
2023	780	+0.52%
Source: INSEE

== See also ==
- Communes of the Haut-Rhin department
