= Dietwiller =

Commune in Grand Est, France

- Commune
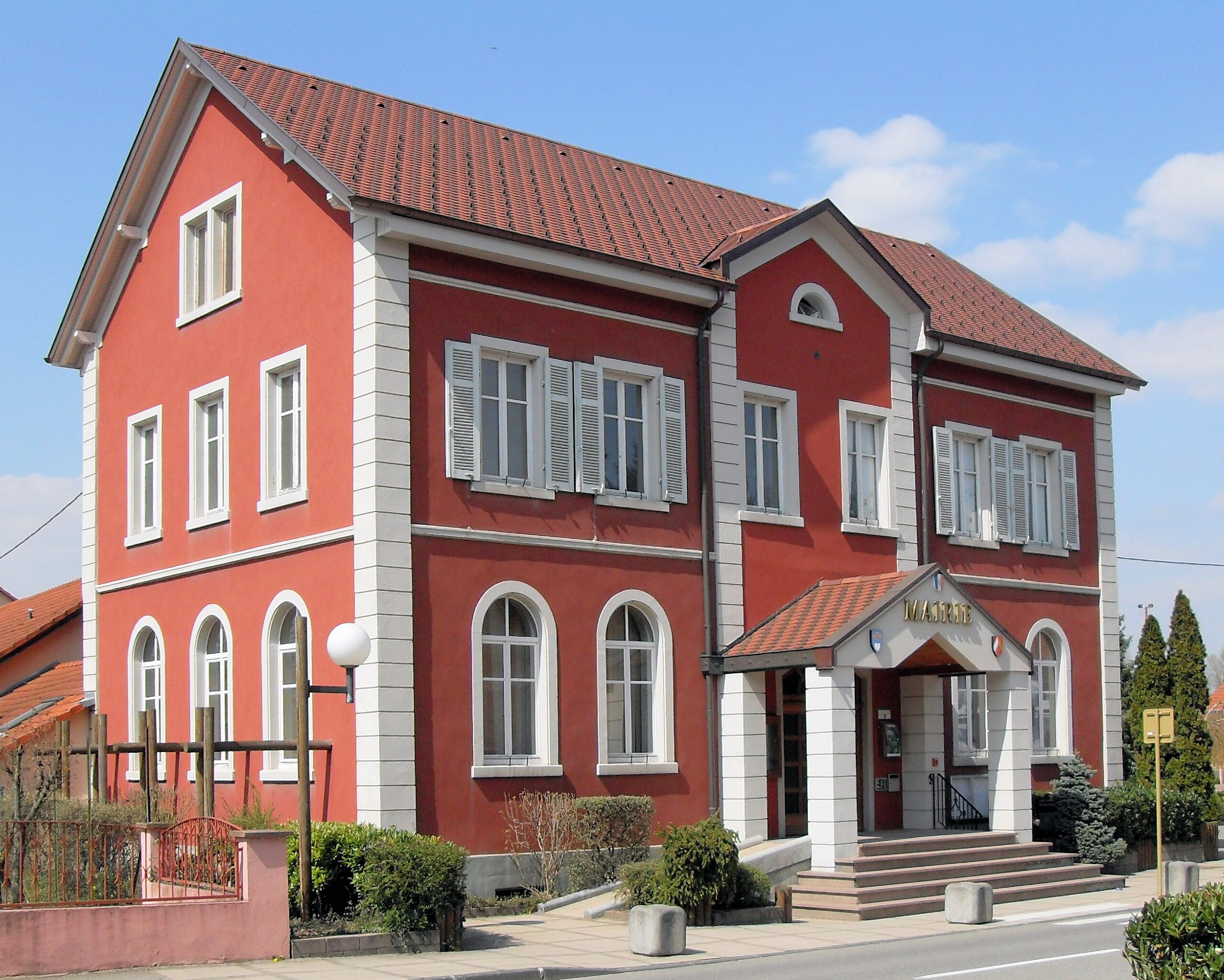
- The town hall in Dietwiller

- Coat of arms
- Location of Dietwiller
- Location within France Location within Grand Est
- Coordinates: 47°41′31″N 7°24′07″E
- Country: France
- Region: Grand Est
- Department: Haut-Rhin
- Arrondissement: Mulhouse
- Canton: Brunstatt-Didenheim
- Intercommunality: Mulhouse Alsace Agglomération

Government
  - Mayor (2020–2026): Christian Frantz
- Area^{1}: 11.06 km^{2} (4.27 sq mi)
- Elevation: 250 m (820 ft)
- Highest elevation: 304 m (997 ft)
- Lowest elevation: 240 m (790 ft)
- Population (2023): 1,385
  - Density: 125.2/km^{2} (324.3/sq mi)
- Time zone: UTC+01:00 (CET)
  - Summer (DST): UTC+02:00 (CEST)
- INSEE/Postal code: 68072 /68440
- ^{1} French Land Register data, which excludes lakes, ponds, glaciers > 1 km^{2} (0.386 sq mi or 247 acres) and river estuaries.

Dietwiller (French pronunciation: [ditvilɛʁ]; German: Dietweiler) is a commune in the Haut-Rhin department in Alsace in eastern France. It forms part of the Mulhouse Alsace Agglomération, the inter-communal local government body for the Mulhouse conurbation.

== History ==
The Thalbahn Habsheim ran through Dietwiller. It was a 24.6 km (15.3 mi) long narrow-gauge railway with a gauge of 600 mm (1 ft 11 5/8 in). It was built during World War I by German soldiers and Romanian prisoners of war as a military light railway. Many prisoners of war died due to malnutrition, forced labor and the poor living conditions and were buried in the Romanian cemetery in Dietweiler.

== See also ==
- Communes of the Haut-Rhin department
