= Steinbrunn-le-Haut =

Commune in Grand Est, France

- Commune
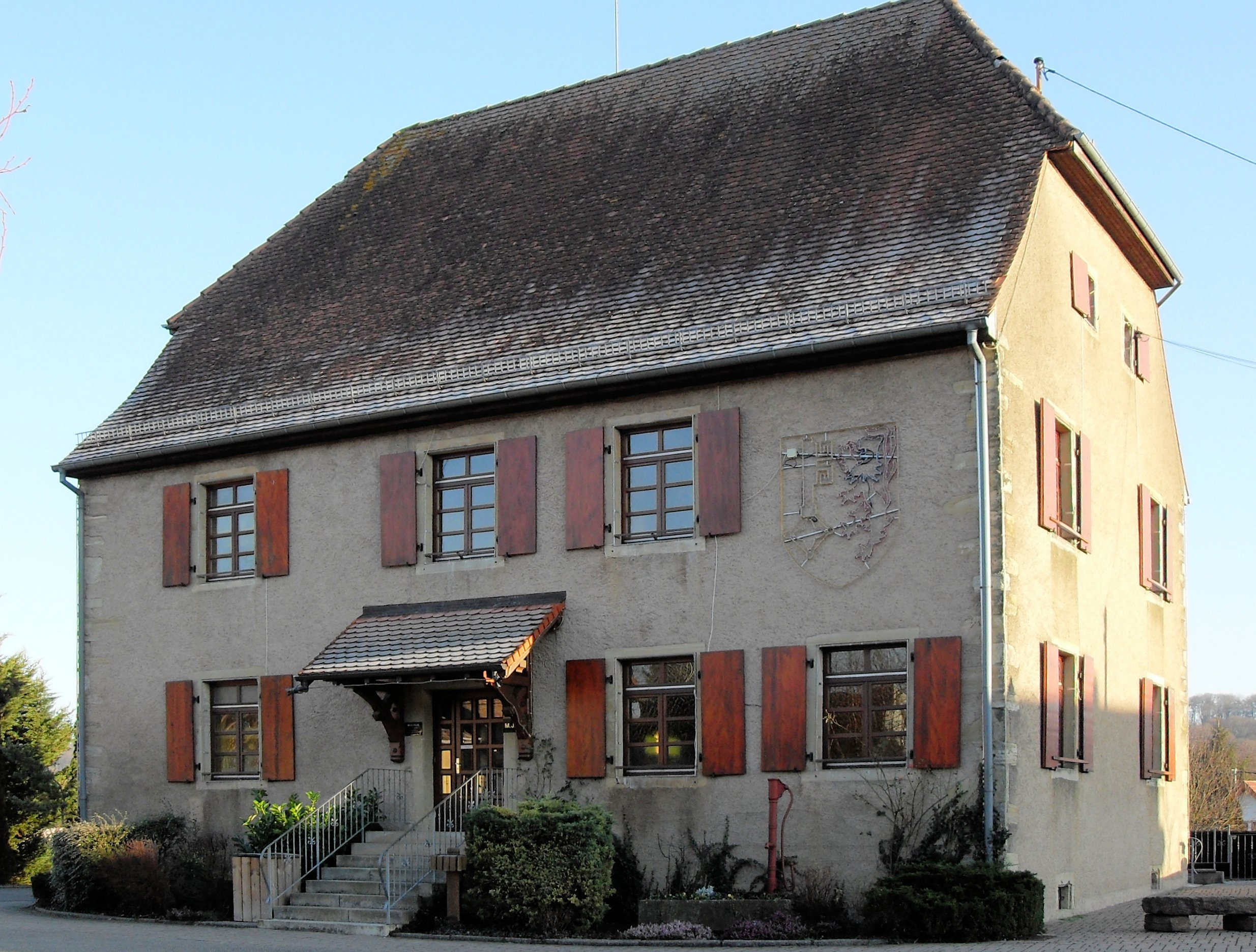
- The town hall in Steinbrunn-le-Haut

- Coat of arms
- Location of Steinbrunn-le-Haut
- Location within France Location within Grand Est
- Coordinates: 47°39′44″N 7°20′57″E
- Country: France
- Region: Grand Est
- Department: Haut-Rhin
- Arrondissement: Mulhouse
- Canton: Brunstatt-Didenheim
- Intercommunality: Saint-Louis Agglomération

Government
  - Mayor (2020–2026): Vincent Strich
- Area^{1}: 9.21 km^{2} (3.56 sq mi)
- Elevation: 305 m (1,001 ft)
- Highest elevation: 404 m (1,325 ft)
- Lowest elevation: 267 m (876 ft)
- Population (2023): 693
  - Density: 75.2/km^{2} (195/sq mi)
- Time zone: UTC+01:00 (CET)
  - Summer (DST): UTC+02:00 (CEST)
- INSEE/Postal code: 68324 /68440
- ^{1} French Land Register data, which excludes lakes, ponds, glaciers > 1 km^{2} (0.386 sq mi or 247 acres) and river estuaries.

Steinbrunn-le-Haut (German: Obersteinbrunn) is a commune in the Haut-Rhin department in Alsace in north-eastern France.

== See also ==
- Communes of the Haut-Rhin department
