= Arrondissement of Mulhouse =

Coordinates: 47°45′N 7°20′E

Mulhouse
- Arrondissement
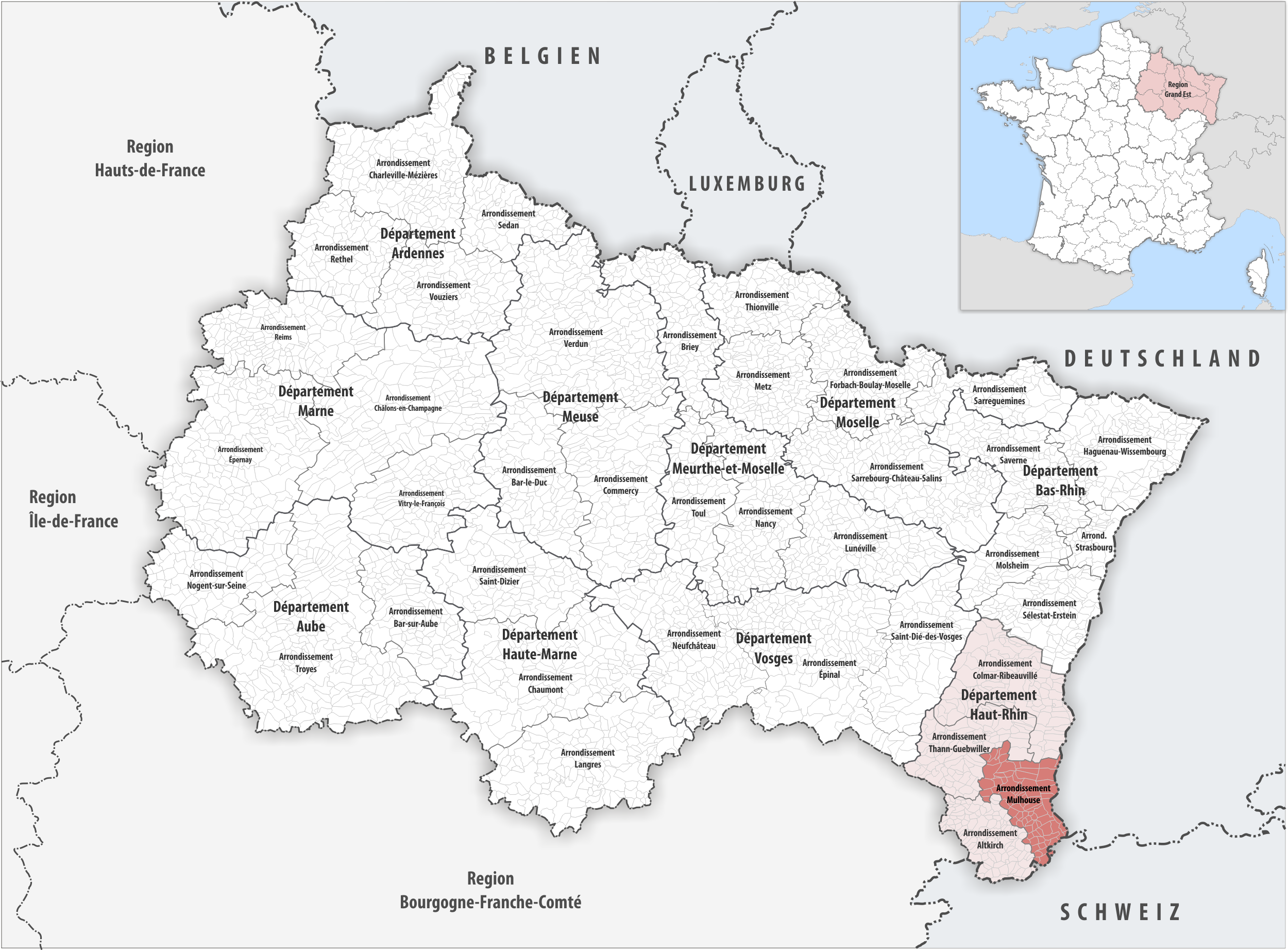
- Location within the region Grand Est
- Country: France
- Region: Grand Est
- Department: Haut-Rhin
- No. of communes: {{{nbcomm}}}
- Area: 707.1 km^{2} (273.0 sq mi)
- Population (2023): 359,581
  - Density: 508.5/km^{2} (1,317/sq mi)
- INSEE code: 684

The arrondissement of Mulhouse is an arrondissement of France in the Haut-Rhin department in the Grand Est region. It has 79 communes. Its population is 356,125 (2021), and its area is 707.1 km^{2} (273.0 sq mi).

== Composition ==
The communes of the arrondissement of Mulhouse are:

1. Attenschwiller
2. Baldersheim
3. Bantzenheim
4. Bartenheim
5. Battenheim
6. Berrwiller
7. Blotzheim
8. Bollwiller
9. Brinckheim
10. Bruebach
11. Brunstatt-Didenheim
12. Buschwiller
13. Chalampé
14. Dietwiller
15. Eschentzwiller
16. Feldkirch
17. Flaxlanden
18. Folgensbourg
19. Galfingue
20. Geispitzen
21. Habsheim
22. Hagenthal-le-Bas
23. Hagenthal-le-Haut
24. Hégenheim
25. Heimsbrunn
26. Helfrantzkirch
27. Hésingue
28. Hombourg
29. Huningue
30. Illzach
31. Kappelen
32. Kembs
33. Kingersheim
34. Knœringue
35. Kœtzingue
36. Landser
37. Leymen
38. Liebenswiller
39. Lutterbach
40. Magstatt-le-Bas
41. Magstatt-le-Haut
42. Michelbach-le-Bas
43. Michelbach-le-Haut
44. Morschwiller-le-Bas
45. Mulhouse
46. Neuwiller
47. Niffer
48. Ottmarsheim
49. Petit-Landau
50. Pfastatt
51. Pulversheim
52. Ranspach-le-Bas
53. Ranspach-le-Haut
54. Rantzwiller
55. Reiningue
56. Richwiller
57. Riedisheim
58. Rixheim
59. Rosenau
60. Ruelisheim
61. Saint-Louis
62. Sausheim
63. Schlierbach
64. Sierentz
65. Staffelfelden
66. Steinbrunn-le-Bas
67. Steinbrunn-le-Haut
68. Stetten
69. Uffheim
70. Ungersheim
71. Village-Neuf
72. Wahlbach
73. Waltenheim
74. Wentzwiller
75. Wittelsheim
76. Wittenheim
77. Zaessingue
78. Zillisheim
79. Zimmersheim

== History ==
The arrondissement of Altkirch was created in 1800. In 1857 the subprefecture was moved to Mulhouse. In 1871 it was disbanded when the area was ceded to Germany. The arrondissement of Mulhouse was restored in 1919. In January 2015 it absorbed five communes of the former arrondissement of Guebwiller and two communes of the former arrondissement of Thann.

As a result of the reorganisation of the cantons of France which came into effect in 2015, the borders of the cantons are no longer related to the borders of the arrondissements. The cantons of the arrondissement of Mulhouse were, as of January 2015:

1. Habsheim
2. Huningue
3. Illzach
4. Mulhouse-Est
5. Mulhouse-Nord
6. Mulhouse-Ouest
7. Mulhouse-Sud
8. Sierentz
9. Wittenheim
