= Stetten, Haut-Rhin =

Commune in Grand Est, France

Stetten
- Commune
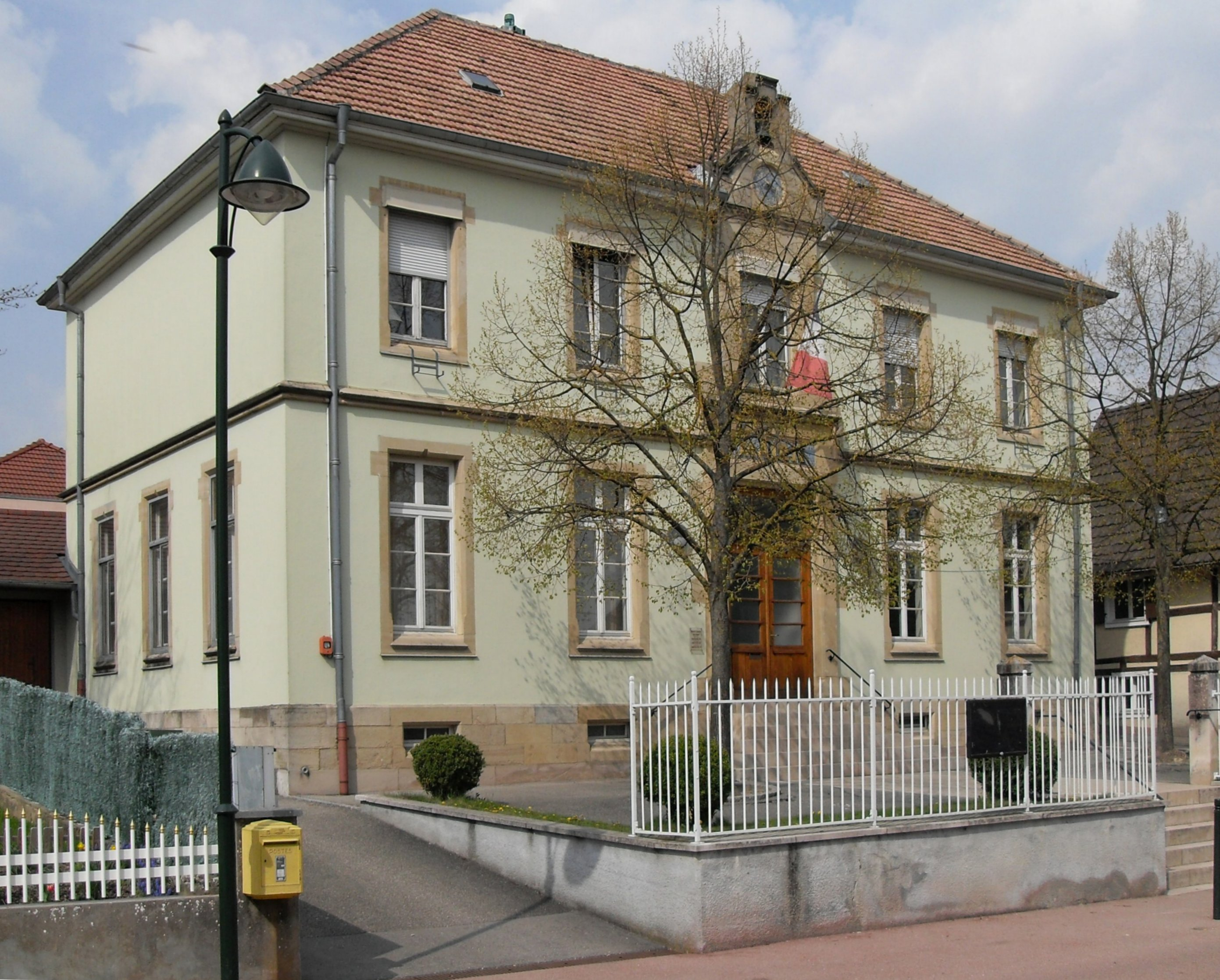
- The town hall in Stetten

- Coat of arms
- Location of Stetten
- Location within France Location within Grand Est
- Coordinates: 47°37′30″N 7°25′36″E
- Country: France
- Region: Grand Est
- Department: Haut-Rhin
- Arrondissement: Mulhouse
- Canton: Brunstatt-Didenheim
- Intercommunality: Saint-Louis Agglomération

Government
  - Mayor (2020–2026): Anne Bezard
- Area^{1}: 4.32 km^{2} (1.67 sq mi)
- Elevation: 340 m (1,120 ft)
- Highest elevation: 410 m (1,350 ft)
- Lowest elevation: 303 m (994 ft)
- Population (2023): 334
  - Density: 77.3/km^{2} (200/sq mi)
- Time zone: UTC+01:00 (CET)
  - Summer (DST): UTC+02:00 (CEST)
- INSEE/Postal code: 68327 /68510
- ^{1} French Land Register data, which excludes lakes, ponds, glaciers > 1 km^{2} (0.386 sq mi or 247 acres) and river estuaries.

Stetten is a commune in the Haut-Rhin department in Alsace in north-eastern France.

== See also ==
- Communes of the Haut-Rhin department
