= Helfrantzkirch =

Commune in Grand Est, France

- Commune
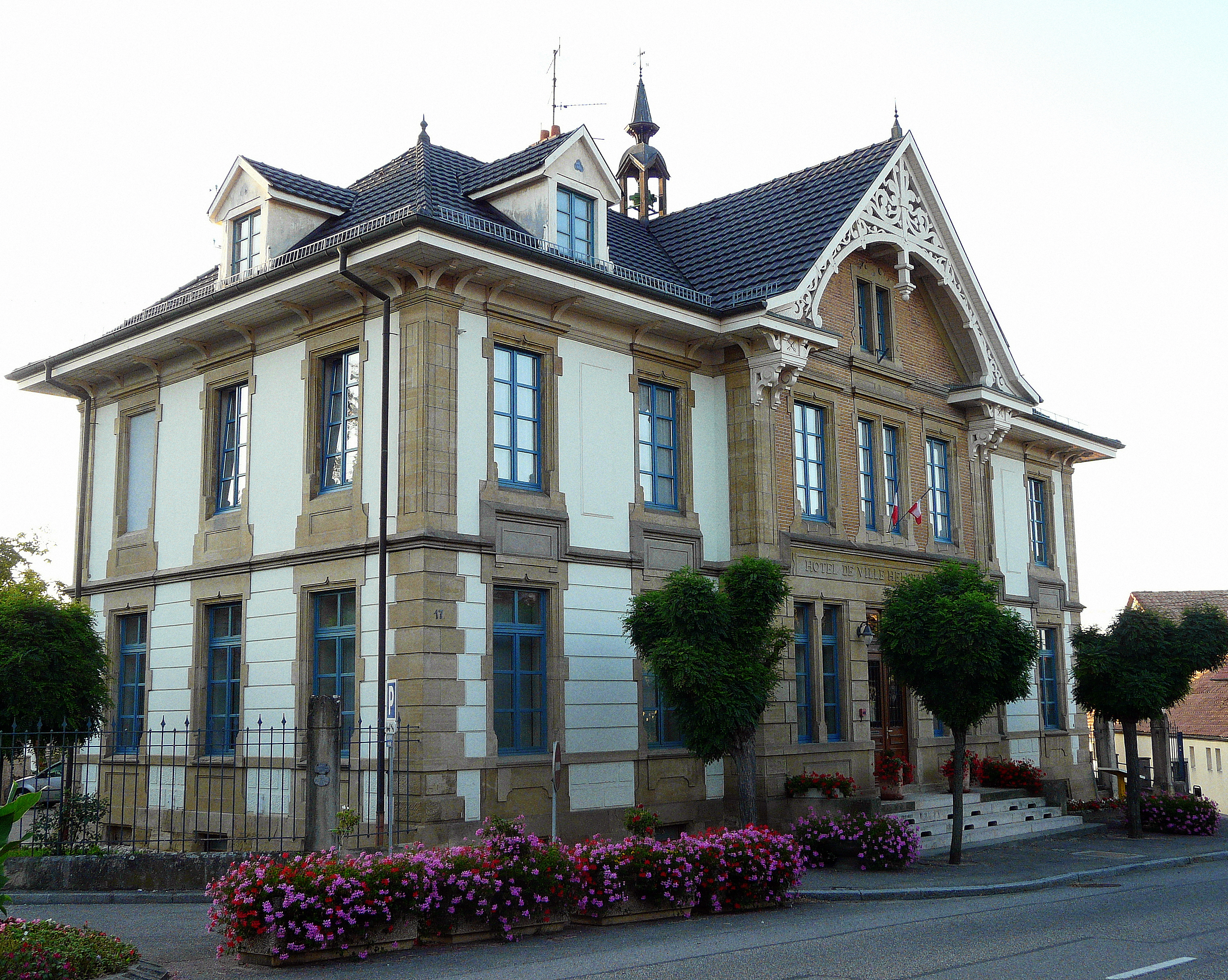
- The town hall in Helfrantzkirch

- Coat of arms
- Location of Helfrantzkirch
- Location within France Location within Grand Est
- Coordinates: 47°36′30″N 7°25′01″E
- Country: France
- Region: Grand Est
- Department: Haut-Rhin
- Arrondissement: Mulhouse
- Canton: Brunstatt-Didenheim
- Intercommunality: Saint-Louis Agglomération

Government
  - Mayor (2020–2026): Yves Tschamber
- Area^{1}: 6.23 km^{2} (2.41 sq mi)
- Elevation: 400 m (1,300 ft)
- Highest elevation: 428 m (1,404 ft)
- Lowest elevation: 330 m (1,080 ft)
- Population (2023): 737
  - Density: 118/km^{2} (306/sq mi)
- Time zone: UTC+01:00 (CET)
  - Summer (DST): UTC+02:00 (CEST)
- INSEE/Postal code: 68132 /68510
- ^{1} French Land Register data, which excludes lakes, ponds, glaciers > 1 km^{2} (0.386 sq mi or 247 acres) and river estuaries.

Helfrantzkirch (German: Helfrantskirch) is a commune in the Haut-Rhin department in Alsace in north-eastern France.

== See also ==
- Communes of the Haut-Rhin département
