= Uffheim =

Commune in Grand Est, France

Uffheim Üffe
- Commune
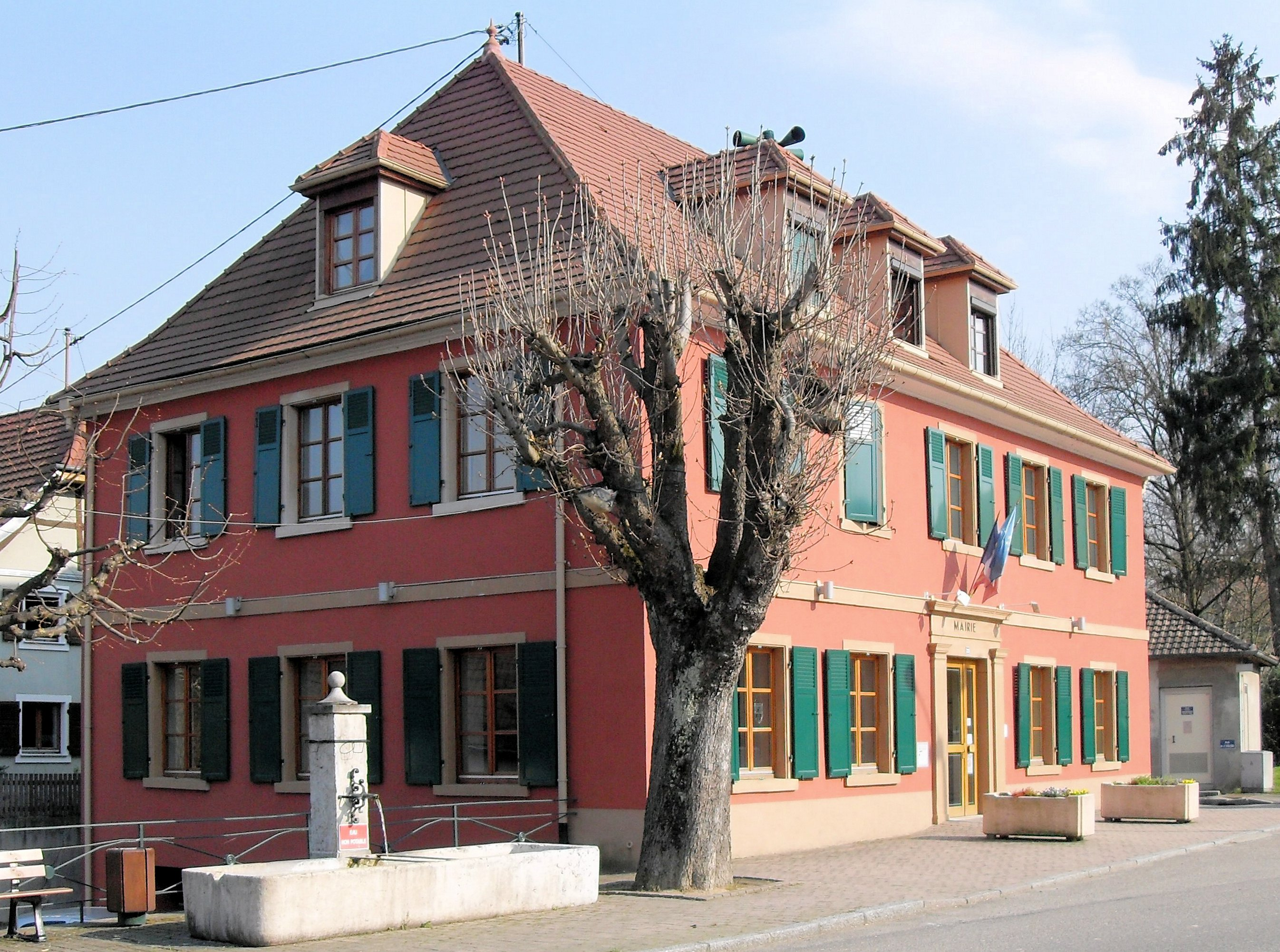
- The town hall in Uffheim

- Coat of arms
- Location of Uffheim
- Location within France Location within Grand Est
- Coordinates: 47°39′02″N 7°26′39″E
- Country: France
- Region: Grand Est
- Department: Haut-Rhin
- Arrondissement: Mulhouse
- Canton: Brunstatt-Didenheim
- Intercommunality: Saint-Louis Agglomération

Government
  - Mayor (2020–2026): André Ribstein
- Area^{1}: 4.36 km^{2} (1.68 sq mi)
- Elevation: 270 m (890 ft)
- Highest elevation: 319 m (1,047 ft)
- Lowest elevation: 261 m (856 ft)
- Population (2023): 1,142
  - Density: 262/km^{2} (678/sq mi)
- Time zone: UTC+01:00 (CET)
  - Summer (DST): UTC+02:00 (CEST)
- INSEE/Postal code: 68341 /68510
- ^{1} French Land Register data, which excludes lakes, ponds, glaciers > 1 km^{2} (0.386 sq mi or 247 acres) and river estuaries.

Uffheim (Alemannic German: Üffe) is a commune in the Haut-Rhin department in Alsace in north-eastern France.

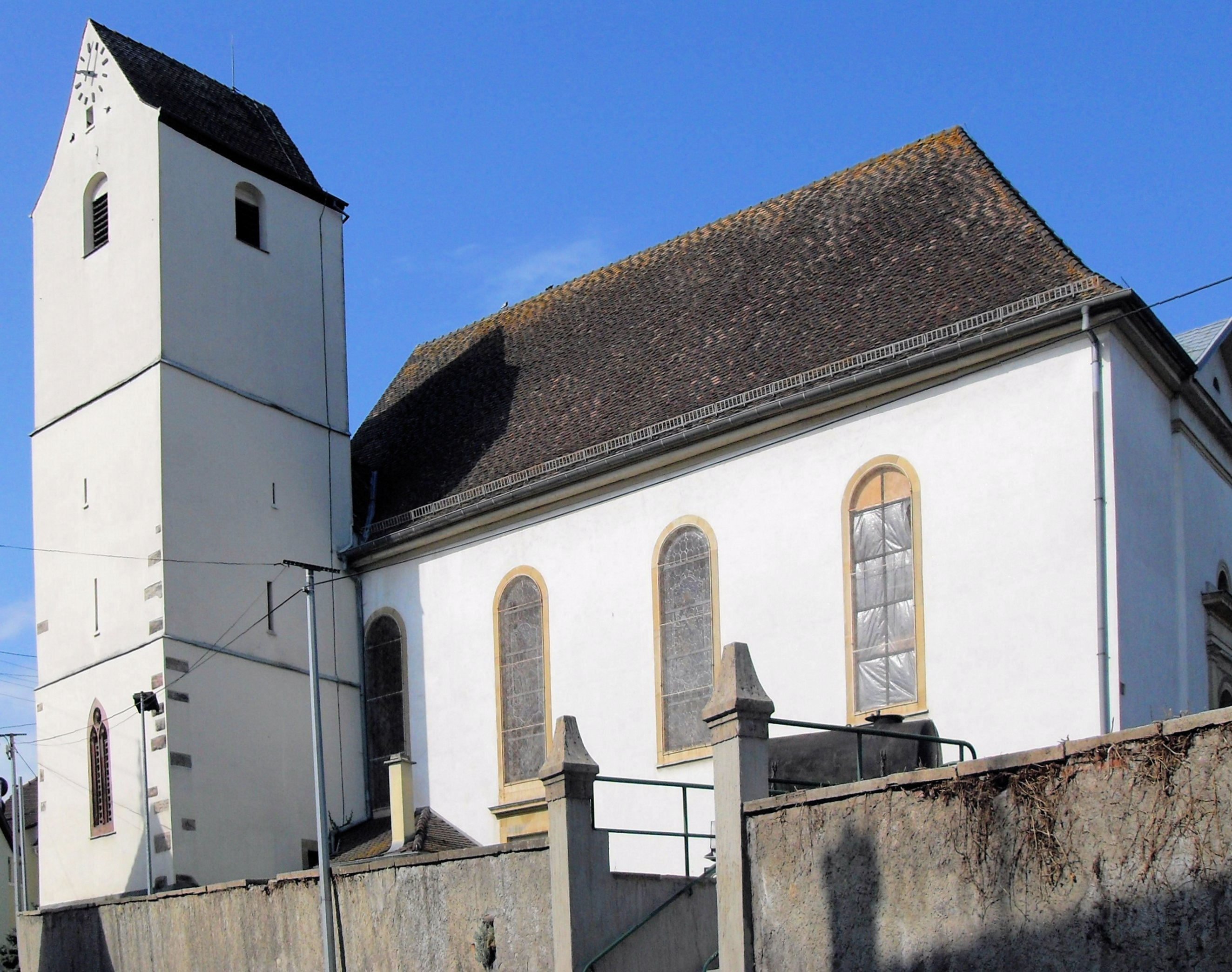
Saint Michael Church

== Population ==
Historical population
Year	Pop.	±% p.a.
1968	573	—
1975	585	+0.30%
1982	658	+1.69%
1990	767	+1.93%
1999	860	+1.28%
2007	859	−0.01%
2012	865	+0.14%
2017	885	+0.46%
2023	1,142	+4.34%
Source: INSEE

== See also ==
- Communes of the Haut-Rhin department
