= Ranspach-le-Haut =

Commune in Grand Est, France

- Commune
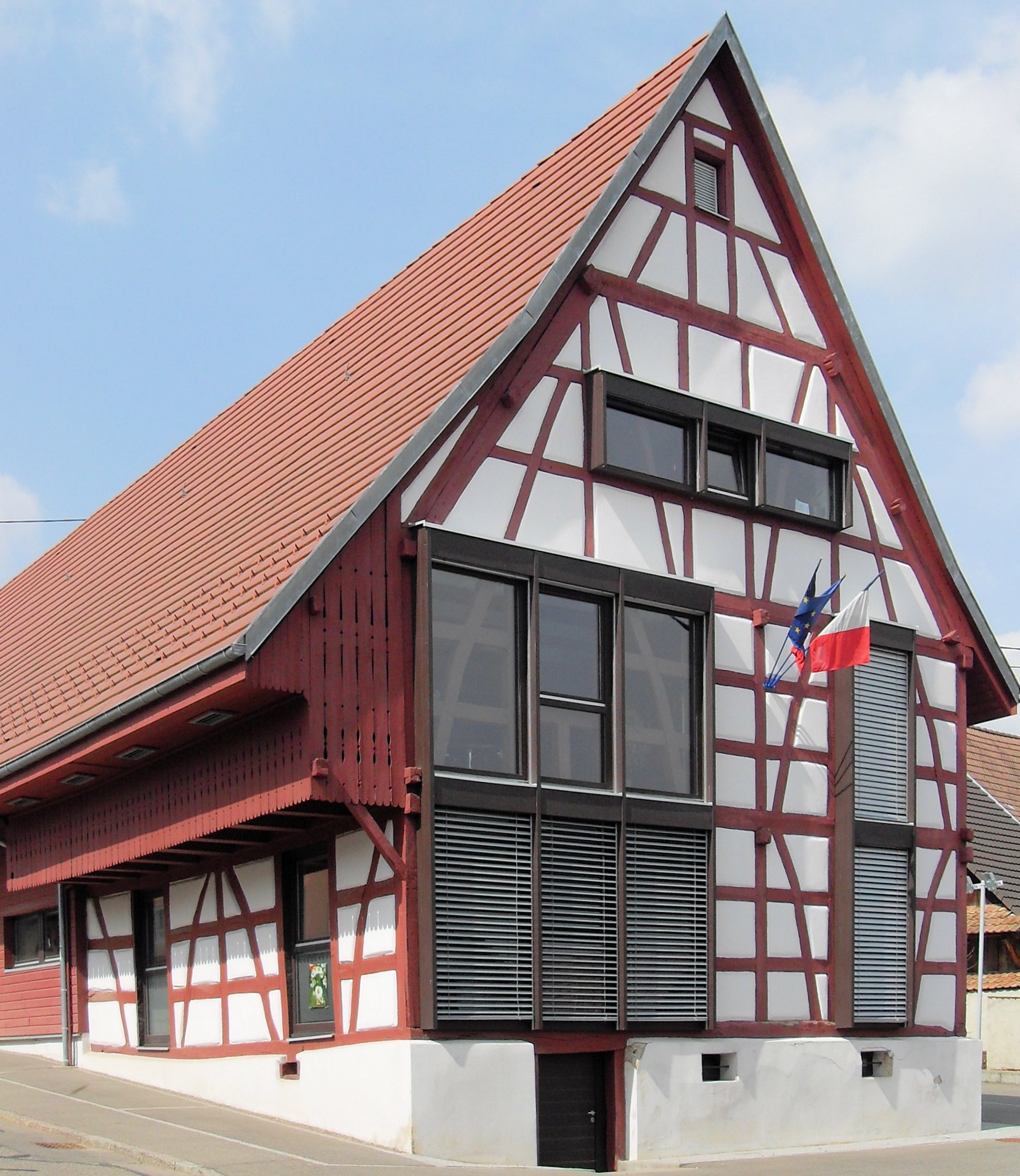
- The town hall in Ranspach-le-Haut

- Coat of arms
- Location of Ranspach-le-Haut
- Location within France Location within Grand Est
- Coordinates: 47°34′42″N 7°25′18″E
- Country: France
- Region: Grand Est
- Department: Haut-Rhin
- Arrondissement: Mulhouse
- Canton: Saint-Louis
- Intercommunality: Saint-Louis Agglomération

Government
  - Mayor (2020–2026): Stéphane Rodde
- Area^{1}: 4.39 km^{2} (1.69 sq mi)
- Elevation: 395 m (1,296 ft)
- Highest elevation: 445 m (1,460 ft)
- Lowest elevation: 342 m (1,122 ft)
- Population (2023): 627
  - Density: 143/km^{2} (370/sq mi)
- Time zone: UTC+01:00 (CET)
  - Summer (DST): UTC+02:00 (CEST)
- INSEE/Postal code: 68264 /68220
- ^{1} French Land Register data, which excludes lakes, ponds, glaciers > 1 km^{2} (0.386 sq mi or 247 acres) and river estuaries.

Ranspach-le-Haut (German: Oberranspach) is a commune in the Haut-Rhin department in Alsace in north-eastern France.

== See also ==
- Communes of the Haut-Rhin department
