= Kembs =

Commune in Grand Est, France

- Commune
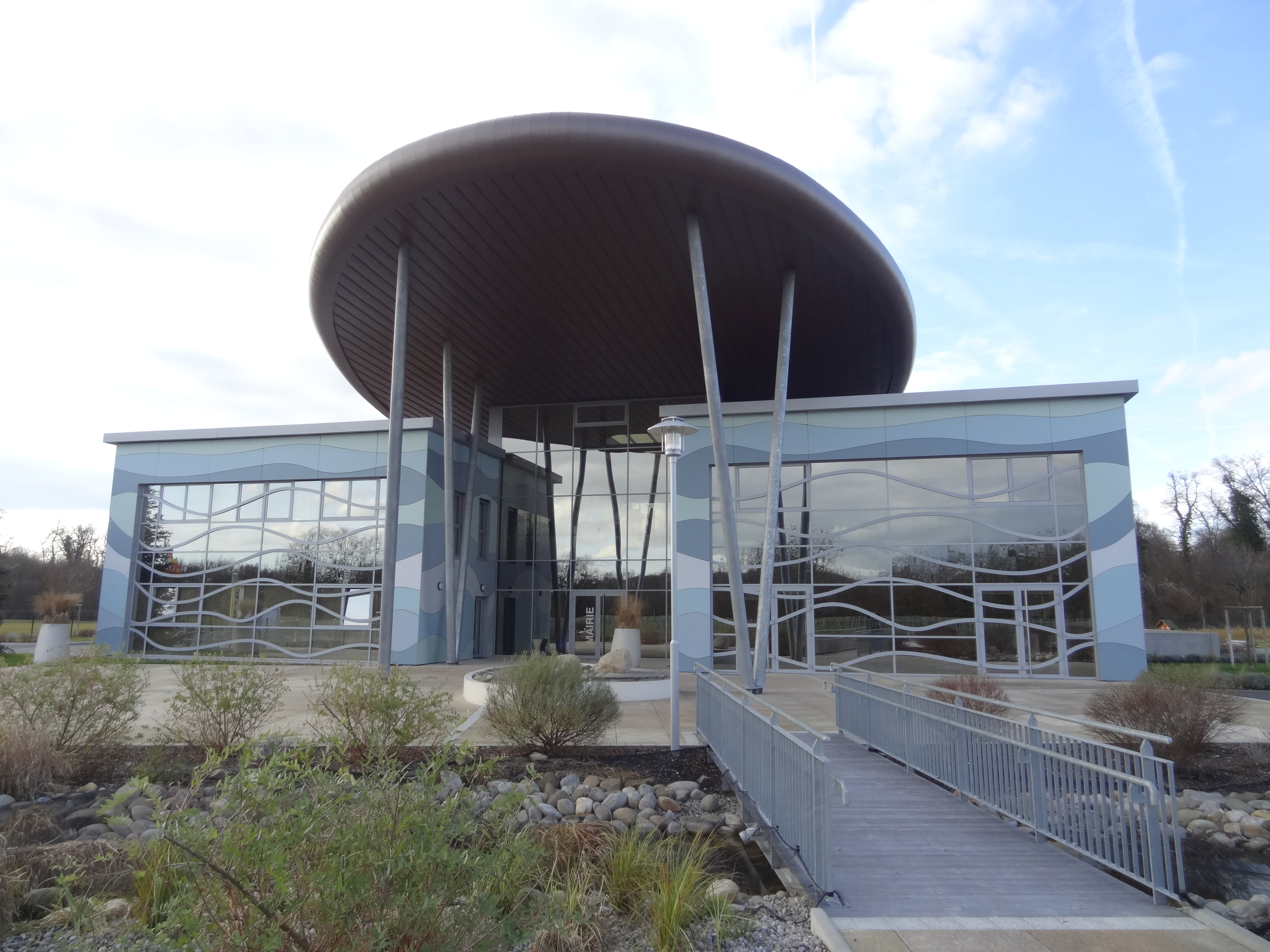
- The town hall in Kembs

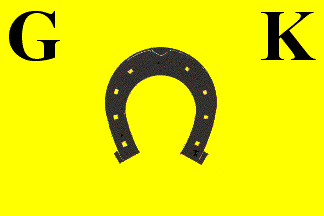
- Flag Coat of arms
- Location of Kembs
- Location within France Location within Grand Est
- Coordinates: 47°41′23″N 7°30′16″E
- Country: France
- Region: Grand Est
- Department: Haut-Rhin
- Arrondissement: Mulhouse
- Canton: Brunstatt-Didenheim
- Intercommunality: Saint-Louis Agglomération

Government
  - Mayor (2020–2026): Joël Roudaire
- Area^{1}: 16.45 km^{2} (6.35 sq mi)
- Elevation: 241 m (791 ft)
- Highest elevation: 255 m (837 ft)
- Lowest elevation: 222 m (728 ft)
- Population (2023): 5,834
  - Density: 354.7/km^{2} (918.5/sq mi)
- Time zone: UTC+01:00 (CET)
  - Summer (DST): UTC+02:00 (CEST)
- INSEE/Postal code: 68163 /68680
- ^{1} French Land Register data, which excludes lakes, ponds, glaciers > 1 km^{2} (0.386 sq mi or 247 acres) and river estuaries.

Kembs (French pronunciation: [kɛms]) is a commune in the Haut-Rhin department in Alsace in north-eastern France. It was founded during Roman times as the city of Cambete.

== Population ==
Historical population
Year	Pop.	±% p.a.
1968	2,009	—
1975	2,211	+1.38%
1982	2,575	+2.20%
1990	3,016	+2.00%
1999	3,739	+2.42%
2007	4,284	+1.72%
2012	4,855	+2.53%
2017	5,257	+1.60%
2023	5,834	+1.75%
Source: INSEE

== See also ==
- Communes of the Haut-Rhin département
