= Waldegg Castle =

Castle in the canton of Solothurn, Switzerland

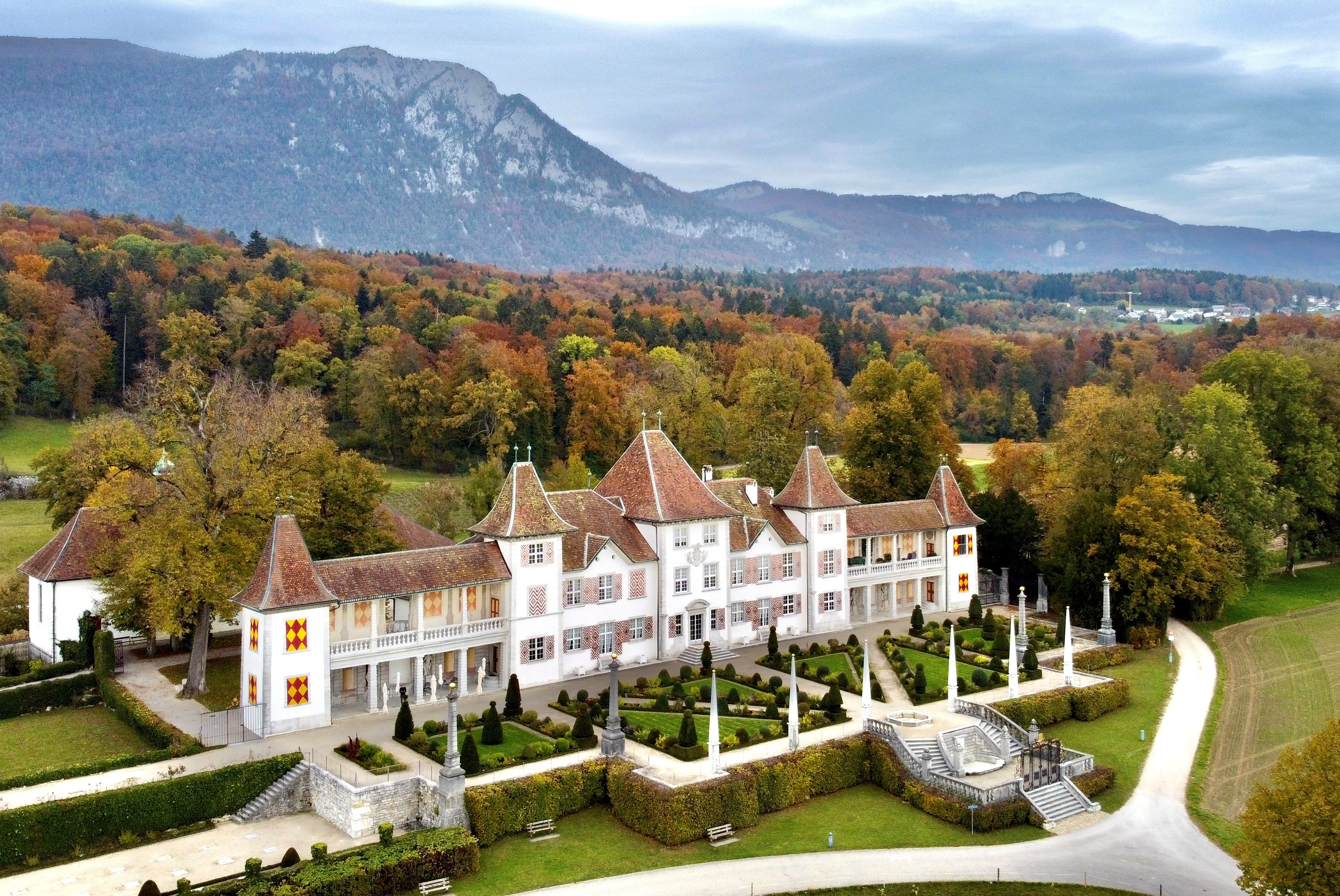
- Waldegg Castle, with the restored baroque garden, including the reconstructed obelisks

- Location within Switzerland Location within Canton of Solothurn
- 47°13′24″N 7°32′54″E
- Location: Feldbrunnen-St. Niklaus

History
- Built: 1682–1686
- Built for: Johann Viktor P. Joseph von Besenval

Site notes
- Architectural style: Castle

Swiss Cultural Property of National Significance

Waldegg Castle, or Schloss Waldegg, is a castle near Solothurn, in the municipality of Feldbrunnen-St. Niklaus of the Canton of Solothurn in Switzerland. It is a Swiss heritage site of national significance.

== History ==
The Baroque castle was built between 1682 and 1686 as a summer house for the Schultheiss Johann Viktor P. Joseph von Besenval (1638–1713) and his wife Maria Margaritha, née von Sury (1649–1713). Over time, the Waldegg Castle, together with the Palais Besenval, developed into one of the main residences of the family von Besenval.

=== House of Besenval: The rise of a family ===
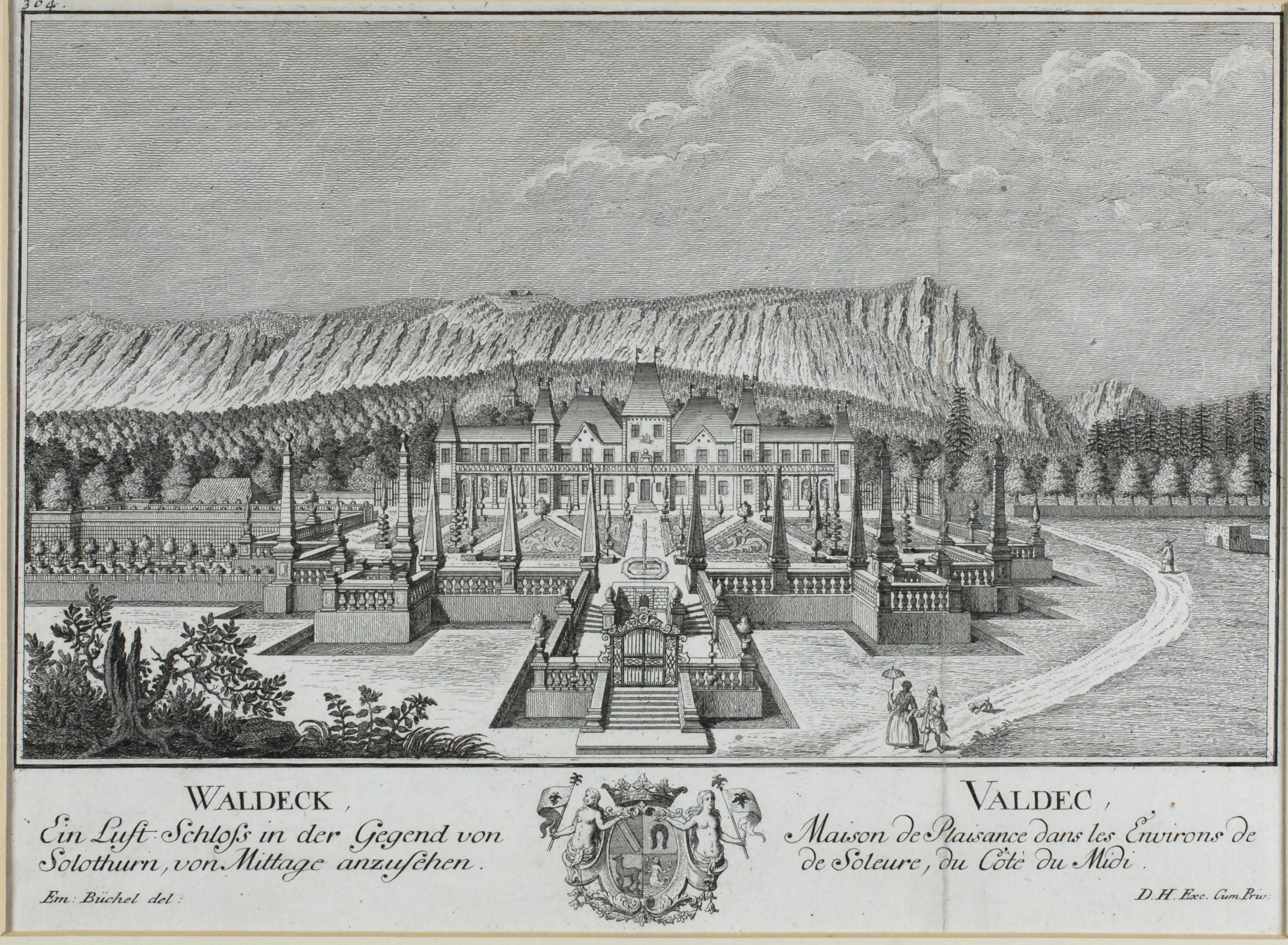
Waldegg Castle in the early 18th century with the original baroque gardens with the obelisks, by Emanuel Büchel.

The family Besenval was originally from Torgnon in the Aosta Valley. They had risen socially in the service of King Louis XIV and had received a title of baron (Reichsfreiherr) of the Holy Roman Empire from Emperor Leopold I in 1695. Furthermore, already in February 1655, Martin von Besenval (1600–1660), Johann Viktor P. Joseph's father, was ennobled by King Louis XIV and raised to knighthood in 1658 in gratitude for his merit for the French Crown. And on 11 August 1726, King Louis XV elevated the von Besenval family's possession of Brunstatt in the Alsace to a French barony. The culmination of the family's ennoblement was the elevation of Martin Louis de Besenval (1780–1853) to the rank of comte by King Charles X on 18 March 1830. The letters of nobility extended to his descendants. Some members of the family also adopted the French spelling of the name, de Besenval.

However, the Besenvals' loyalty to the French Crown was also rewarded financially, as reflected in a remark by the French ambassador in Solothurn in 1709 that later became legendary:

"Were the king able to buy a man such as Besenval in every canton, France might reckon upon the [Swiss] Confederation as upon its own kingdom."

— Ambassador Roger Brûlart, Comte de Sillery et Marquis de Puysieulx (1640–1719), the French ambassador in Solothurn, praising the loyalty of Schultheiss Johann Viktor P. Joseph von Besenval to the French Crown

The French money was a welcome financial boost for the construction of the Waldegg Castle.

The Besenvals became rich through the salt trade and the mercenary business with France. A mechanism that was common among mercenary patricians soon set in: Because the Besenvals had influence in their own town, they became important for foreign powers – and because they were valued abroad, their power in turn grew in their own town.

=== Johann Viktor von Besenval ===
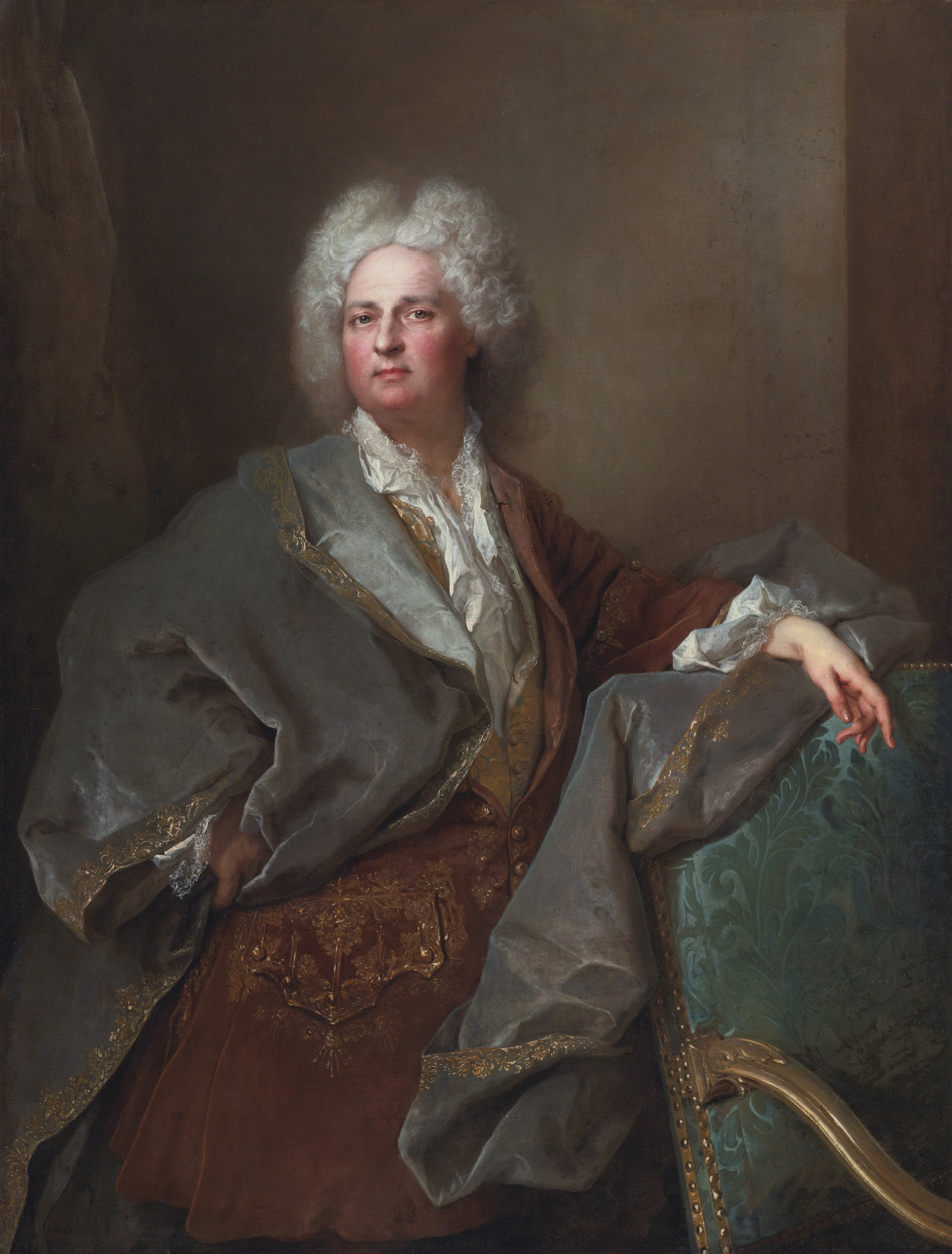
Johann Viktor von Besenval. Portrayed by Nicolas de Largillière (1720).

Johann Viktor P. Joseph's son Johann Viktor, Baron von Besenval von Brunstatt, was a diplomat and colonel in the regiment of the Swiss Guards of France. After he inherited the Waldegg Castle in 1713, he had it renovated. Furthermore, he added a theater, commissioned in 1722 and completed in 1736, and a chapel, the Chapel of Saint Michael, commissioned in 1729 and decorated in the current French style, to the castle. He brought numerous works of art back with him from France.

==== Palais Besenval ====
Johann Viktor von Besenval and his brother Peter Joseph (1675–1736) commissioned the construction of the Palais Besenval in Solothurn in 1703.

==== A wedding warmly welcomed by the French Crown ====
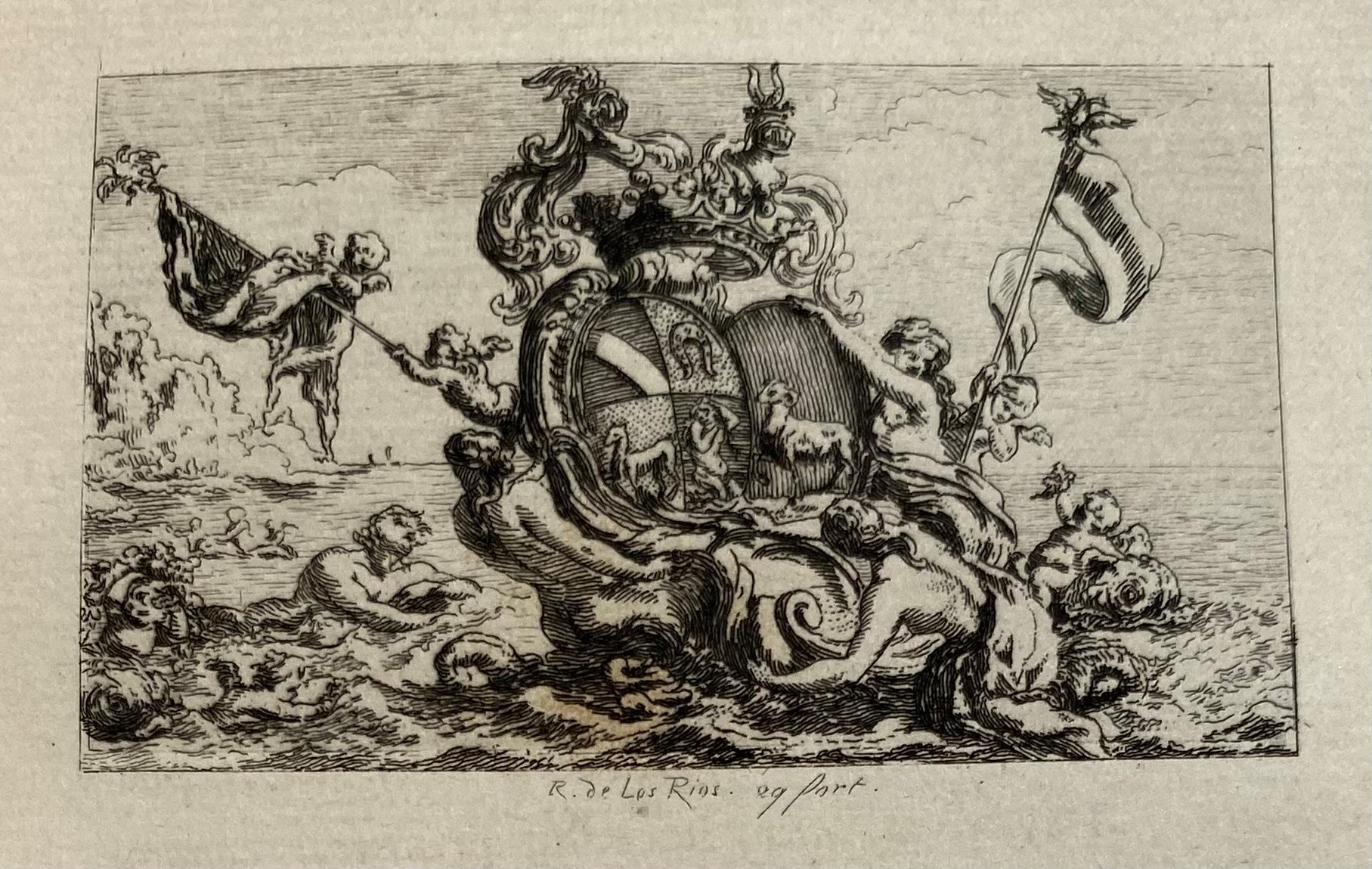
The arms of alliance of the families de Besenval (quartered shield) and Bieliński. The Barony of Brunstatt is represented by the horseshoe. The silver doe stands for Riedisheim and the silver mermaid for Didenheim, the two other estates of the family de Besenval in the Alsace. Engraving by Ricardo de los Ríos.

On 18 September 1716, Johann Viktor married Katarzyna Bielińska (1684–1761), daughter of Kazimierz Ludwik Bieliński, a Polish noble, politician and diplomat. She was also the sister of Maria Magdalena Bielińska, div. Gräfin von Dönhoff, who was the Maîtresse-en-titre of King Augustus II the Strong. A marriage warmly welcomed by Philippe II de Bourbon, Duc d'Orléans, Régent de France between 1715 and 1723, given that Johann Viktor von Besenval was serving as French ambassador to Poland at the time.

==== Death in Paris and a funerary monument by Jacques Caffieri ====
Johann Viktor von Besenval died on 11 March 1736 in his hôtel particulier on the Rue de Varenne in Paris. His funeral took place in the church of Saint-Sulpice, where he was also buried. His funerary monument in the church featured a bust relief made by Jacques Caffieri in 1737. During the French Revolution, his monument, along with those of other representatives of the Ancien Régime, was destroyed. However, an engraving of the monument survives in the Rijksmuseum in Amsterdam.

=== Peter Viktor von Besenval and his heirs ===
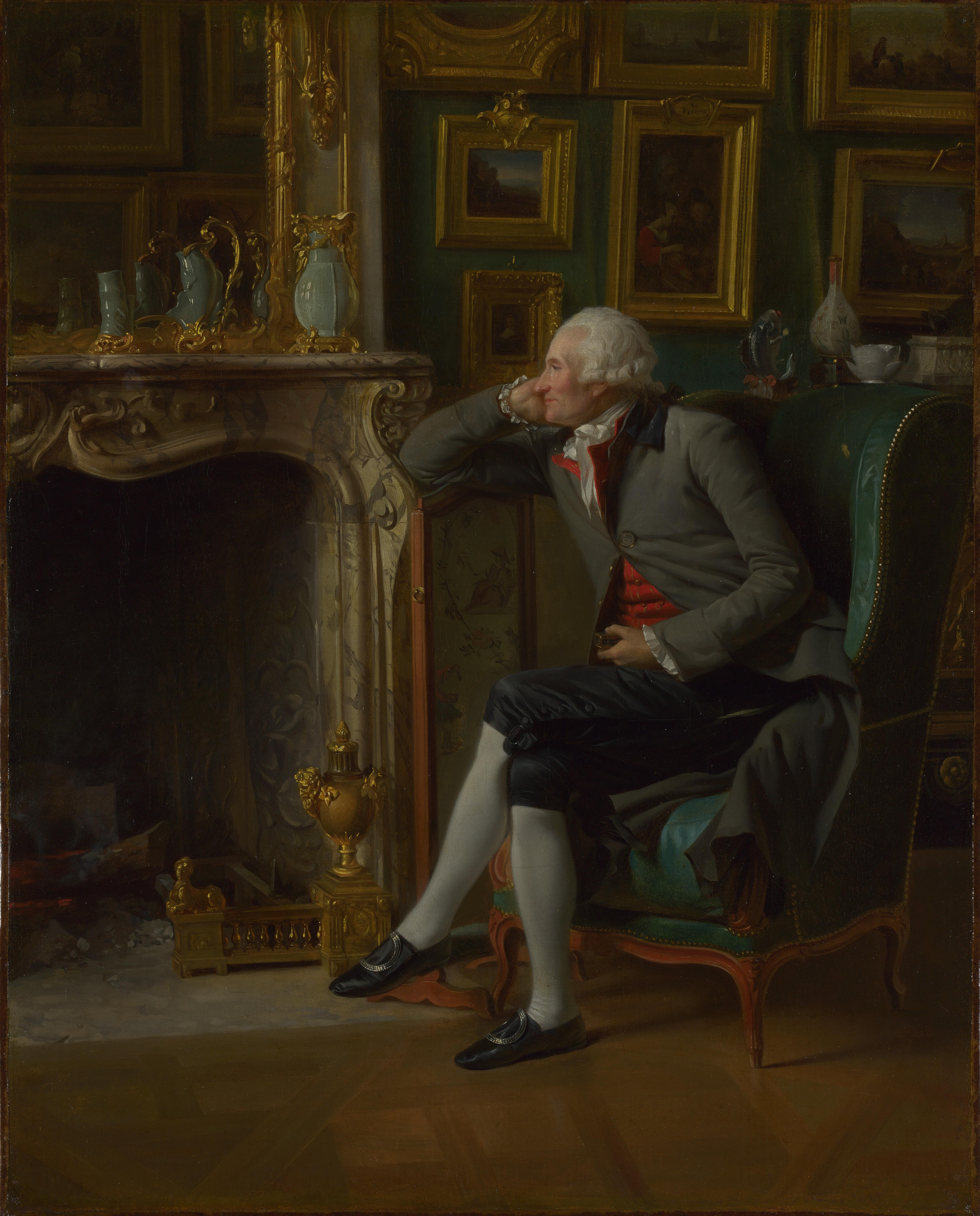
Le Baron de Besenval dans salon de compagnie at the Hôtel de Besenval, by Henri-Pierre Danloux (1791). This portrait of Peter Viktor von Besenval is now on display in the National Gallery.

Johann Viktor's son Peter Viktor, Baron von Besenval von Brunstatt, a Swiss military officer in French service, was born at the Waldegg Castle in 1721. When his father died in 1736, he inherited the Waldegg Castle. However, he lived most of his life in France, where he was known as Pierre Victor, Baron de Besenval de Brunstatt, and where, in 1767, he bought the Hôtel Chanac de Pompaodur and made it his residence in Paris. Today the hôtel particulier is known as Hôtel de Besenval. It has housed the Embassy of the Swiss Confederation and the residence of the Swiss ambassador to France since 1938.

Peter Viktor rarely stayed in Switzerland anymore. The center of his life was in Paris. Due to his absence, he left the use of the Waldegg Castle to his cousin Johann Viktor Peter Joseph von Besenval (1742–1786) and his wife Maria Anna Margrit, née von Roll (1741–1814). Although he wasn't often in Switzerland, Peter Viktor did add an orangery, the Pomeranzen-Hause, to the castle in 1780.

==== The French Revolution: The beginning of the end of an era ====
The French Revolution of 1789 was disastrous to the family's influence, business interests and wealth. Although all the family members survived the terror of the French Revolution, their close ties to the French royal family and other high-ranking members of the Ancien Régime made life more and more difficult for them in France.

Peter Viktor von Besenval, who was part of the highest circle of power in France, saw the dark clouds looming over the Ancien Régime in the course of 1789. After the Storming of the Bastille on 14 July 1789, he wanted to escape to Switzerland, to his country estate, the Waldegg Castle, but he was no longer able to do so. On 26 July 1789, he was recognised in Villegruis while fleeing revolutionary troops. He was immediately arrested and sent to prison. In October 1789 he was charged with the crime of lèse-nation. The baron was never to see the Waldegg Castle again. Only with good luck and good friends did he survive the terror of the revolution. He was acquitted on 1 March 1790. Peter Viktor von Besenval died on 2 June 1791 at his residence in Paris, the Hôtel de Besenval.

==== Death in Paris without a legitimate heir ====
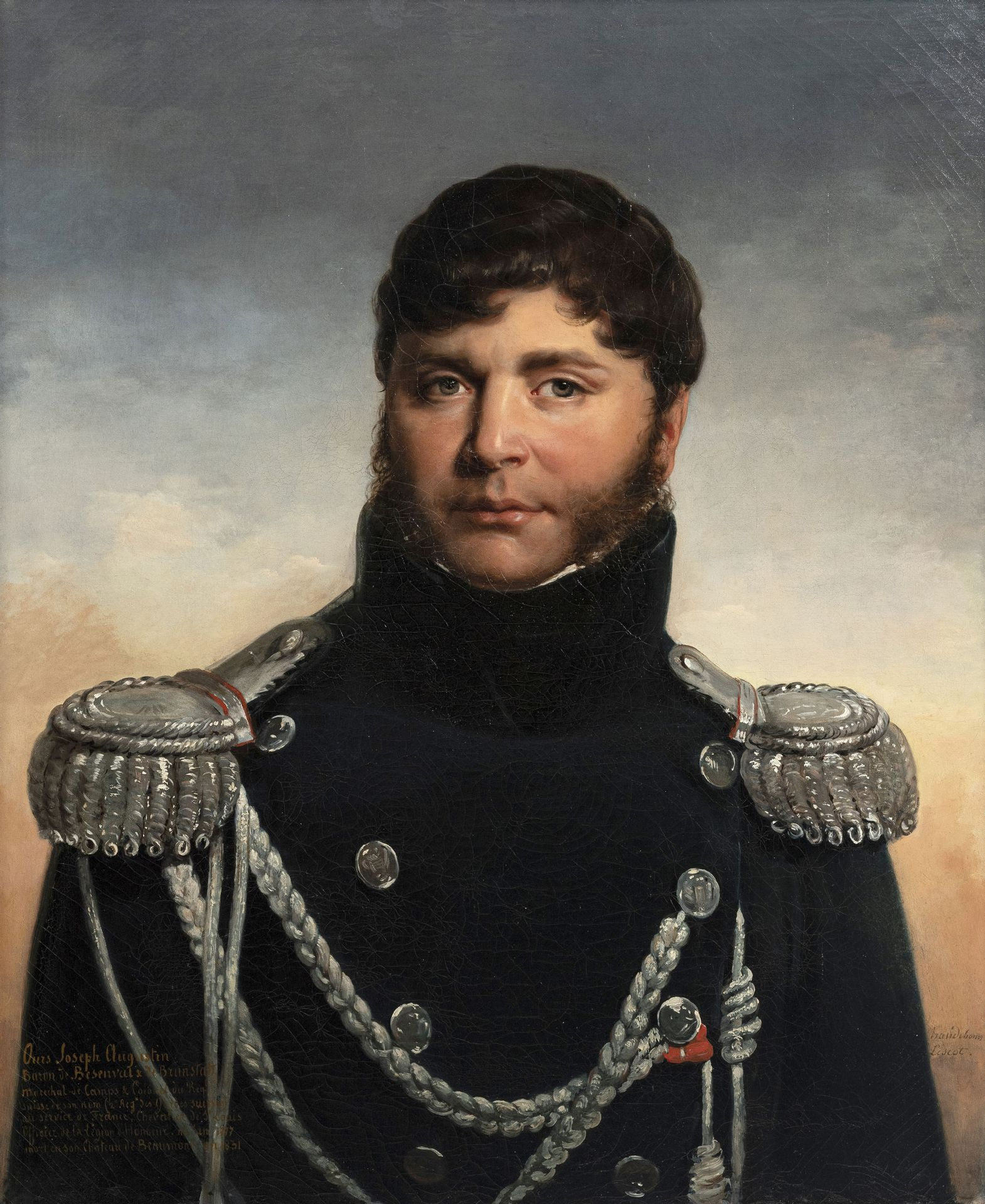
Ours Joseph Augustin von Besenval (1777–1831). He inherited the Waldegg Castle from Peter Viktor von Besenval in 1791. Portrayed by Hortense Haudebourt-Lescot (1820). The portrait is on display in the Nationalmuseum.

After the death of Peter Viktor von Besenval in 1791, who was in fact not childless but had no legitimate heir, the Waldegg Castle, which was a Fidéicommis and could therefore only be passed on in the immediate family, went to the firstborn son of his cousin Johann Viktor Peter Joseph, the minor Ours Joseph Augustin von Besenval (1777–1831).

It would later fall to Ours Joseph Augustin von Besenval to handle the increasingly precarious financial circumstances of the family von Besenval after the French Revolution, which led to the loss of their once considerable French income. Years later, on 18 October 1830, the precarious financial situation led to Ours Joseph von Besenval marrying his only daughter and universal heir Marie Louise Emélie (1804–1838) to her first cousin Amédée de Besenval (1809–1899). Amédée was the eldest son of Ours Joseph von Besenval's brother Martin Louis de Besenval, first Comte de Besenval (1780–1853), and Anne Caroline, née von Roll (1786–1829).

In order to avoid dispersal of the family heritage, marriages between cousins often occurred within the family von Besenval, but these led to a weakening of the line of descent due to excessive consanguinity. The result was increasing signs of degeneration.

==== The biological child and heir of the Hôtel de Besenval ====
Peter Viktor von Besenval's only child was his biological son Joseph-Alexandre Pierre, Vicomte de Ségur. After the death of his father in 1791, he inherited the bare ownership of the Hôtel de Besenval in Paris.

==== The sale of the baron's furniture to the Swiss Confederation ====
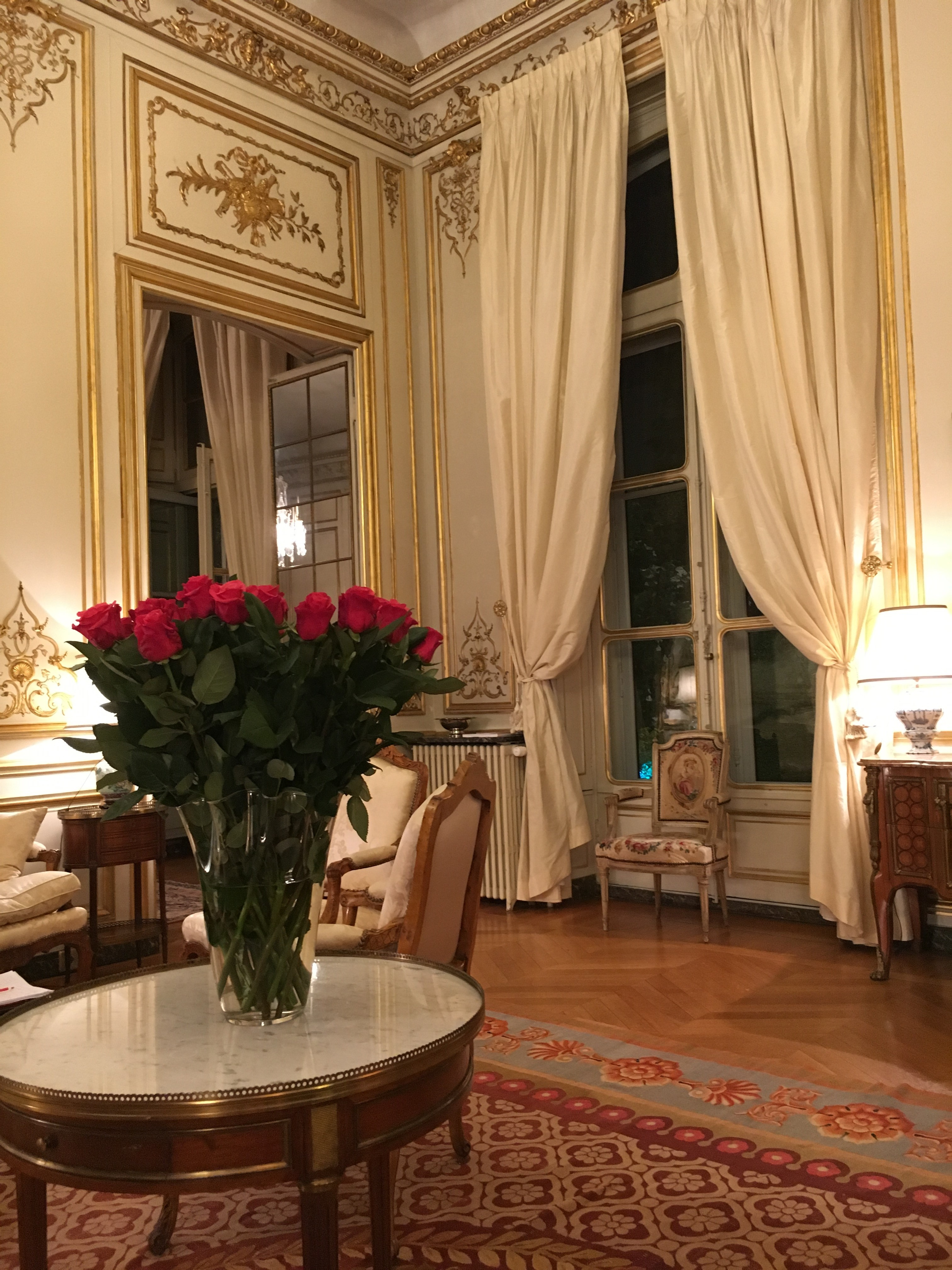
Brought back to the Hôtel de Besenval from the Waldegg Castle in 1938: One of the six chairs from the Baron de Besenval's original furniture ensemble is visible in the window niche in the Salon de la tapisserie.

On 19 May 1938, the Swiss Confederation purchased the Hôtel de Besenval in Paris as the country's new legation building. In the same year, the Swiss Government bought from the patrician family von Sury, the then owners of the Waldegg Castle, a sofa and six chairs, covered in beige fabric and embroidered with scenes from the fables of Jean de La Fontaine, except for the sofa, which is covered with a pattern of flowers and birds.

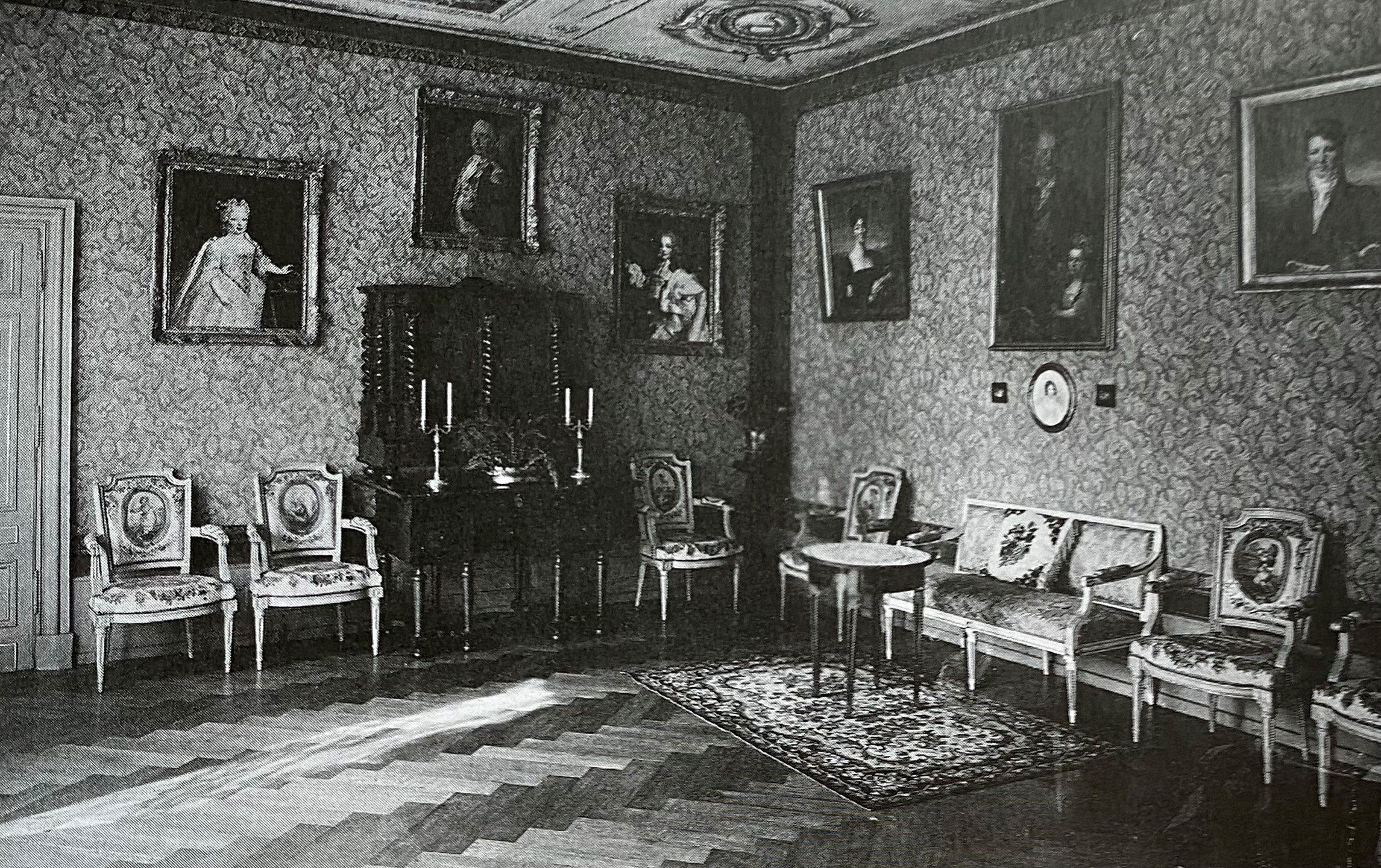
A photograph from the 1920s of the Salon de Besenval at the Waldegg Castle: Visible are the six chairs of the original furniture ensemble from the Hôtel de Besenval (the sofa in the picture is not the one that the Swiss Confederation also bought for the Hôtel de Besenval in 1938).

According to oral tradition, the sofa and the six chairs once belonged to Peter Viktor von Besenval and were part of the furnishings of the Hôtel de Besenval. It is said that the baron sent these pieces of furniture, along with other pieces of furniture and works of art, to Switzerland shortly before the French Revolution. In a photo from the 1920s, the six chairs are placed in the Salon de Besenval at the Waldegg Castle. Today the furniture ensemble is on display at the Hôtel de Besenval in the Salon de la tapisserie.

The entire furnishings that remained at the Hôtel de Besenval after the baron's death in 1791 were auctioned in Paris on 10 August 1795. Therefore only the pieces that the baron had sent to Switzerland, to the Waldegg Castle, before the French Revolution, or pieces that he left to his family in Solothurn in his will, such as family portraits, remained in the family's possession. However, these were only a few pieces, mostly with a family connection. His son Joseph-Alexandre Pierre, Vicomte de Ségur, also kept some pieces of furniture in memory of his father, as well as his father's portrait, painted by Henri-Pierre Danloux in 1791.

In his will dated 18 May 1804, the Vicomte de Ségur bequeathed the remaining furniture of the Baron de Besenval to his partner and mother of his son, Alexandre Joseph de Ségur (1793–1864), Reine Claude de Mesmes d'Avaux, Comtesse d'Avaux, née Chartraire de Bourbonne, Dame de Bourbonne-les-Bains (1764–1812).

=== The Federal Council's plans for the field fortifications at the Waldegg Castle ===
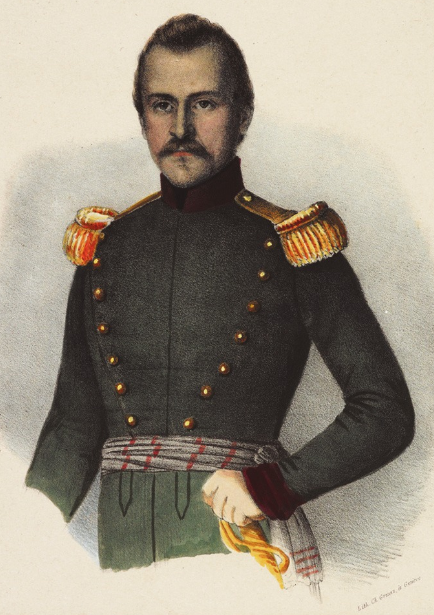
Federal Councillor Ulrich Ochsenbein was not amused with the attitude of the government of the city of Solothurn. In order to protect the entire region, he wanted to convert the Waldegg Castle into a fortress.

In the 1850s, the Swiss Federal Council, especially Federal Councillor Ulrich Ochsenbein, was seriously concerned about the defense capability of the Solothurn region, because the city set about demolishing its old 18th-century fortifications. This prompted Ulrich Ochsenbein to reprimand the city authorities, which, however, did not impress them at all. The demolition of the old fortifications continued.

This in turn prompted Federal Councillor Ulrich Ochsenbein, after consulting General Guillaume Henri Dufour, to demand the restoration of the old fortifications or to build new field fortifications, including in the area of the Waldegg Castle. Accordingly, the corresponding plans were drawn up on behalf of the Federal Council.

==== The abandoned Waldegg Castle ====
Regarding the Waldegg Castle, the castle was no longer inhabited at this time. The last main owner of the estate of the family von Besenval, Amédée, Comte de Besenval (1809–1899), tried desperately to get rid of it. On 27 July 1854, Amédée de Besenval tried unsuccessfully to sell the Waldegg Castle Estate at auction. He even considered renting it out and turning it into a manufacturing facility.

==== The plans for the field fortifications disappeared into the archives ====
If the fortification plans from the 1850s had been realised, the castle would not have been demolished. But an entrenchment was planned in the cour d'honneur on the south side of the castle and firearms openings in the barn in the rear courtyard. In addition, the castle and its park would have been largely walled in. Furthermore, the baroque parterre would have been replaced by a glacis and platforms for snipers would have been placed in the galleries.

These already well-developed plans were only not implemented because the threat from the Prussians had disappeared after the settlement of the Neuchâtel Crisis in 1857. Furthermore, there was no longer any threat until the start of World War I in 1914.

=== The Besenval era is coming to an end: Josef von Sury von Bussy ===
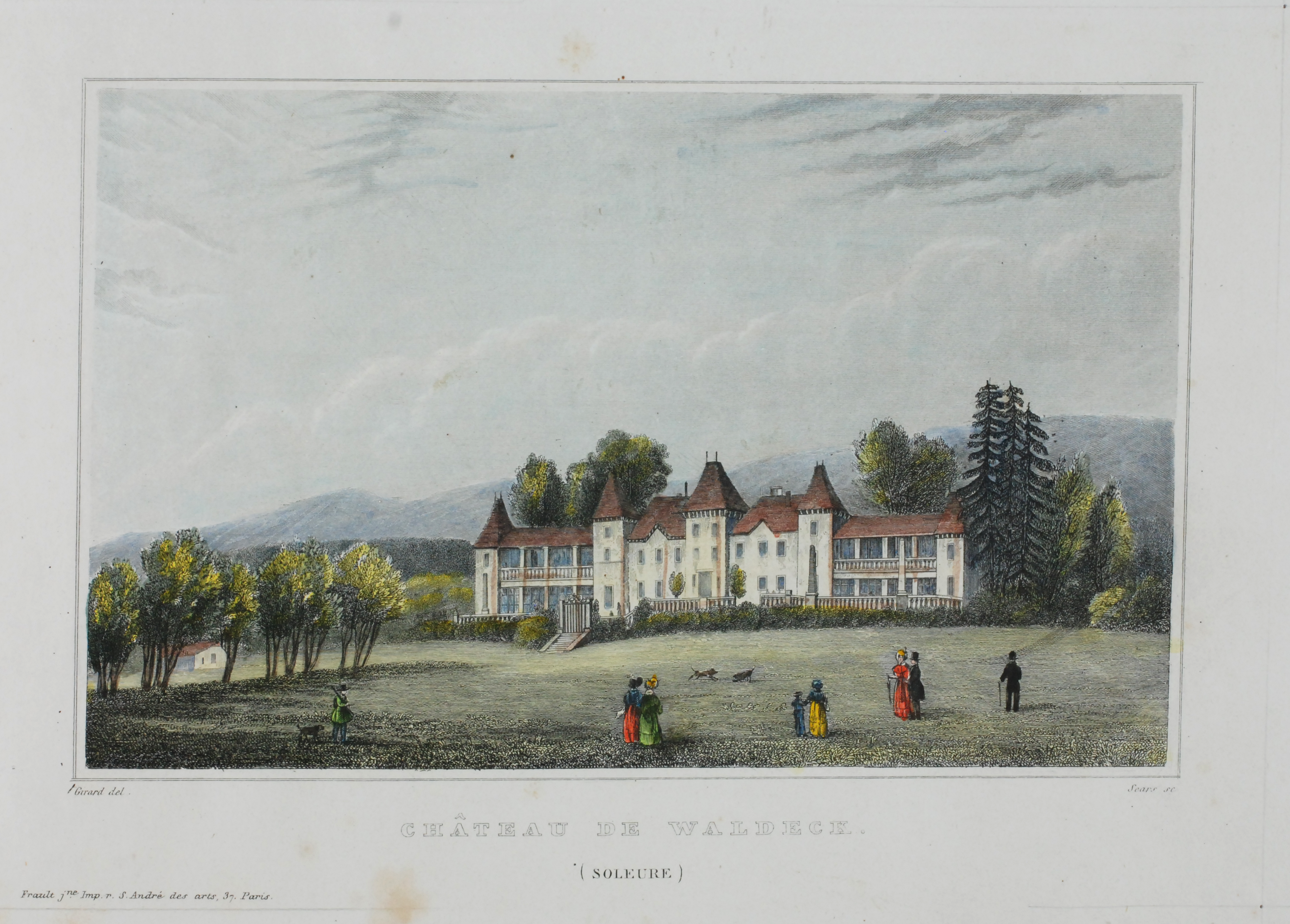
Waldegg Castle, lithography, at around the time, when Josef von Sury von Bussy bought the estate.

Finally, a solution for the future of the Waldegg Castle was found within the family. Josef von Sury von Bussy (1817–1887), who had been married to Charlotte de Besenval (1826–1885) since 26 June 1848, bought the Waldegg Castle, including the furniture and the paintings, on 6 February 1865 from the last members of the family von Besenval who were entitled to inherit the assets of the former Fidéicommis de Waldegg, which existed from 1684 to 1811. On the one hand, this was Amédée, Comte de Besenval (1809–1899), the brother-in-law of Josef von Sury von Bussy. He was the main heir to the Waldegg Castle Estate. On the other hand, these were Amédée de Besenval's two daughters Marie Joséphine (1833–1869) and Marie Laurette (1837–1912), who had inherited their shares from their late mother Marie Louise Emélie de Besenval, née von Besenval (1804-1838). Marie Louise Emélie de Besenval, née von Besenval, was a first cousin of her husband Amédée, Comte de Besenval. With Amédée Victor Louis, Comte de Besenval (1862–1927), who lived in Naples, the main line of the family died out in 1927. Amédée Victor Louis' father Victor (1819–?) and his uncle Jules (1820–1894) were both in military service in Naples for the then ruling dynasty, the House of Bourbon-Two Sicilies. Both served with the rank of Captain. In 1840, they were joined by their brother Amédée (1809–1899). After the death of his wife Marie Louise Emélie (1804–1838), he also settled in Naples for some time with his two daughters.

The new owner of the Waldegg Castle had it renovated and added two apartments. Furthermore, he changed the Baroque garden into an English landscape garden. However, the alterations to the garden were reversed during subsequent renovations in the late 1980s and early 1990s. The historic Baroque garden with its obelisks and figures was reconstructed.

=== The donation and purchase agreement with the Canton of Solothurn ===
From the early 20th century, the Waldegg Castle was no longer just a summer house, but was inhabited all year round. In 1963, the last private owners of the Waldegg Castle, the three children of Gaston von Sury von Bussy (1852–1931) and his wife Anne, née de Reinach Hirtzbach, Charles (1884–1973), Victor (1892–1978) and Marguerite (1883–1969) donated the Waldegg Castle to the Canton of Solothurn, also because there were no direct descendants left of the three siblings. Only Charles and his wife Gertrude, née Frölicher (1884–1968), had children, two sons. However, Jean (1920–1923) died at the age of three and his brother Gaston (1918–1948) died in an accident in the Jungfrau massif in 1948.

==== A modest financial compensation and a modest rent for the descendants of the family von Sury ====
The three siblings Charles, Victor and Marguerite von Sury received a modest financial compensation from the Canton of Solothurn of CHF 600,000 for the 200,000 square meter complex consisting of the Waldegg Castle and its formal garden and park, several outbuildings, two chapels, an allée, agricultural land and a farm. In addition, the descendants of the family von Sury continue to have the right to live in the apartments on the first floor of the east wing of the castle at a modest rent of CHF 1,000 per year (the rent was indexed to the level of 1963 and has since been adjusted according to inflation. The annual rent in 2022 was CHF 3,923). The prerequisite is that the tenants bear the family name von Sury. In the same year that the purchase and donation agreement came into force, in 1963, the castle estate was transferred to the Waldegg Castle Foundation. In 1975, the Waldegg Castle became the headquarters of the Center for Intercultural Dialogue, an organisation that fosters understanding between the different languages and cultures of Switzerland. In 1963, a comprehensive renovation programme was started that lasted over 20 years. The castle museum opened in 1991.

== Architecture: The castle and its surroundings ==
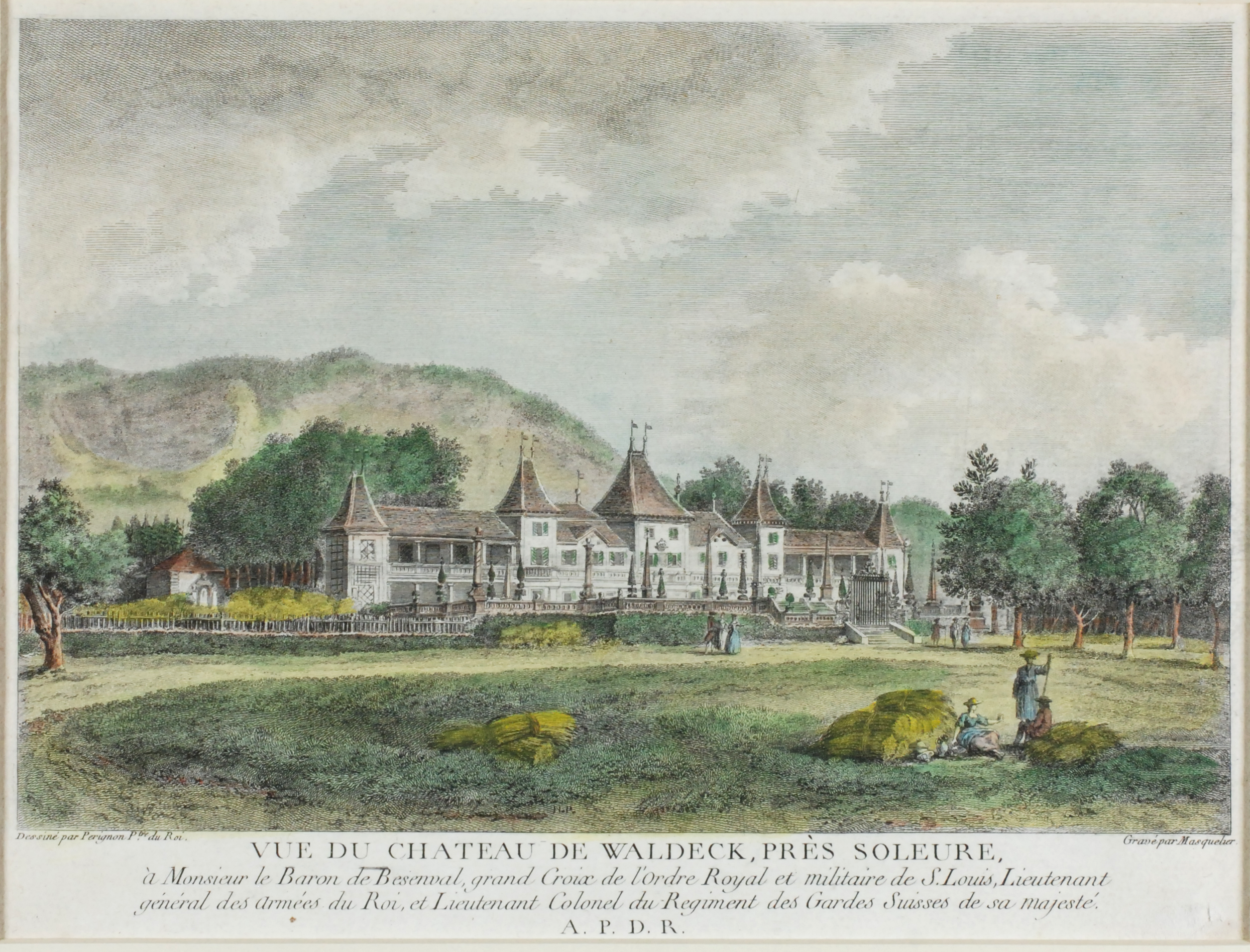
Waldegg Castle, engraving by Nicolas Perignon with dedication to Pierre Victor, Baron de Besenval, around 1785.

The Waldegg Castle was built in the local Türmlihaus style, meaning a house with many towers, relative to its size. The architectural influences of the French and Italian Baroque are clearly visible.

In the first construction phase in the 17th century, the rectangular wing – the corps de logis, designed by an unknown architect – was built with three tower-like pavilions facing the garden. Between these towers are two three-bay sections, each crowned with a gable.

From 1689, after Johann Viktor P. Joseph von Besenval (1638–1713) was appointed Schultheiss of the Republic of Solothurn in 1688, long, single-floor galleries were added on both sides of the corps de logis, at the ends of which are corner turrets, a kind of small pavilions. At the beginning of the 18th century, these single-floor galleries were heightened by one floor. These first floor galleries were formerly used as loggias. Niches in the galleries house allegorical statues which were carved in 1683 by Johann Peter Frölicher (1662–1723). These statues originally adorned as free-standing figures the roof cornice of the two once single-floor galleries.

The coat of arms symbols of the family von Besenval can be seen in and around the castle. In the central axis of the corps de logis on the south façade, there is the coat of arms of the family von Besenval in stucco. And horseshoes, the symbols of the coat of arms of the Besenvals' Barony of Brunstatt, adorn the red and white shutters of the corps de logis.

=== Smaller than it actually seems: A façade castle ===
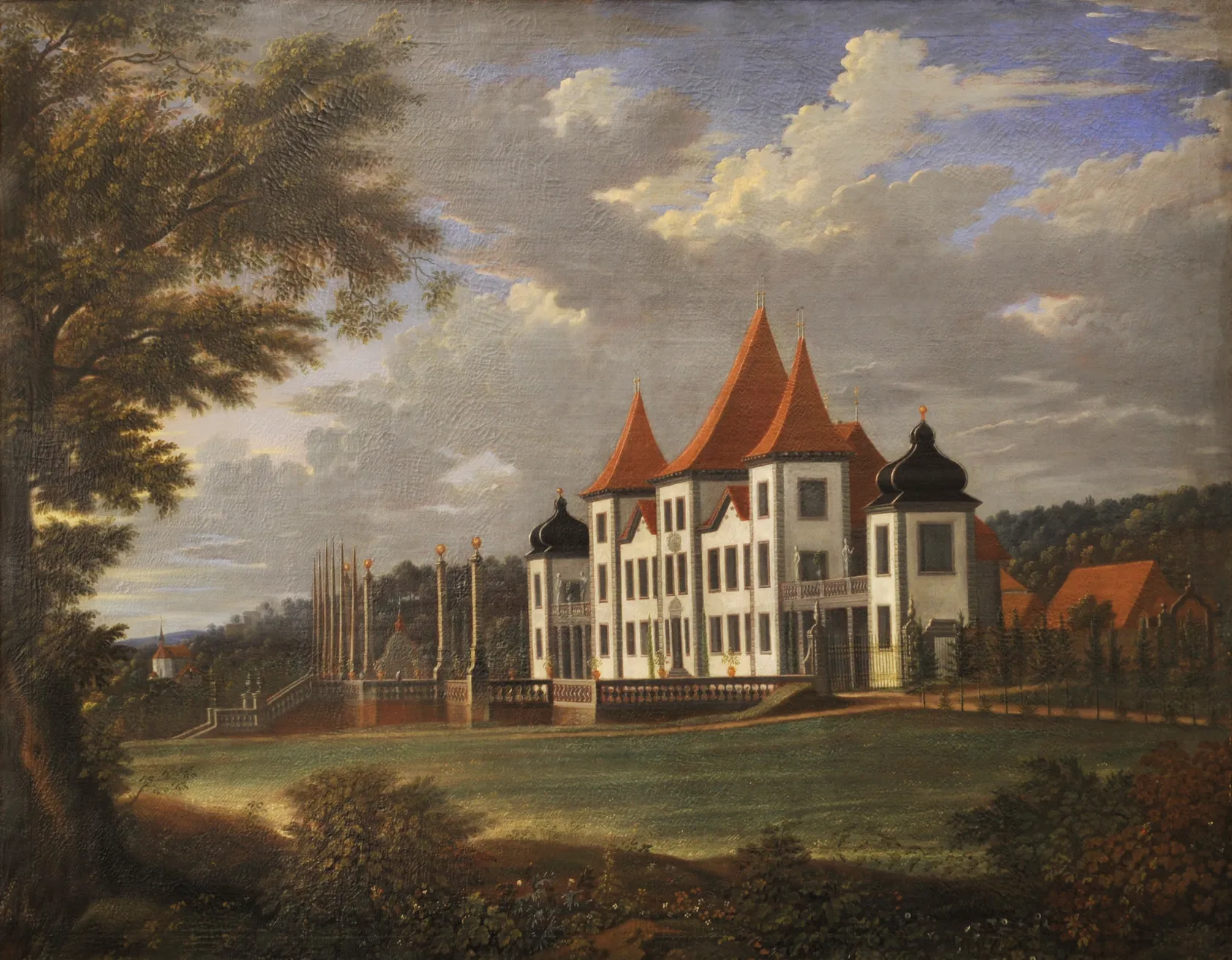
Waldegg Castle in a 17th-century oil painting with its original corner turrets with the onion domes. Also visible are the original single-floor galleries with the sculptures on their balustrades, as well as the original baroque gardens with the obelisks and the gilded balls on their tops.

The Waldegg Castle is also known as a façade castle or a coulisse castle because the two expanded wings of the building to the left and to the right of the corps de logis only consist of galleries with balusters, which serve as connecting corridors, leading to the corner turrets, the small pavilions. Originally these corner turrets had imperial roofs (bulbous roofs, also called onion domes). Behind the galleries with their large windows with usually closed shutters, however, there are no parts of the building. Especially from the distance, these galleries make the castle appear much larger than it actually is. This castle architecture was particularly popular in Italy, where such extensive country house façades also served as backdrops for the popular garden festivals. However, the façade also clearly reflects the representative claim to power of its builder. All in all, the façade measures 78 meters. This makes it the longest baroque castle façade in Switzerland. In contrast, the corps de logis is only 13.5 meters deep.

==== Behind the façade ====
The windows of the galleries provide a clear view of the rear courtyard of the building, the north side, with the less glamorous courtyard façade, where the farm buildings are also located, as well as one of the two chapels. This chapel was dedicated to Saint Michael in honour of Katarzyna Bielińska (1684–1761), the Polish wife of Johann Viktor von Besenval.

=== Great hall and salons on the ground floor ===
The Great hall, also called Salon de jardin, of the Waldegg Castle has ten allegorical paintings of the Arts and Sciences painted in 1734 by the Parisian painter Sébastien Le Clerc (1676–1764) and his workshop. In addition, there are paintings with landscape scenes and hunting still lifes painted in the trompe-l'œil style. The Salon de jardin also served as the dining room from the 19th century. The eastern salon, the Salon de Besenval, has a grisaille style ceiling fresco. The fresco shows the various coats of arms of the different estates of the family von Besenval as well as a noble crown, which together form the coat of arms of the family von Besenval. The western salon, the Salon des Ambassadeurs, has a trompe-l'œil style ceiling fresco. The fresco from around 1690, attributed to the local painter Michael Vogelsang (circa 1663–1719) and his workshop, shows a wide sky with an ornate balustrade framing the sky.

=== Bel étage ===
The first floor, with a room height of almost four meters, is the main floor of the castle, the Bel étage. The two main rooms on the first floor, the master bedroom and the reception room, are located in the middle wing, the Avant-corps. Both rooms have ceiling paintings from around 1685. The ceiling painting in the master bedroom is dedicated to love. The central medallion shows Venus and Mercury. Cupid can be seen in the four corner medallions. The family von Sury later set up the billiard room here. The second room was the main reception room of the family von Besenval. This room shows the highest quality ceiling painting in the entire castle. It shows a trompe-l'œil style dome architecture. In contrast to the other ceiling frescoes, which are painted using the lime casein technique, this ceiling fresco is the only one in the castle that is painted in oil. This reception room was originally decorated with leather wallpaper. The library of the family von Besenval was also on the first floor. In 1763, however, the library was converted into a salon. Today this room is called the Salon bleu.

=== Two chapels – one in honour of Katarzyna, Baronne de Besenval ===
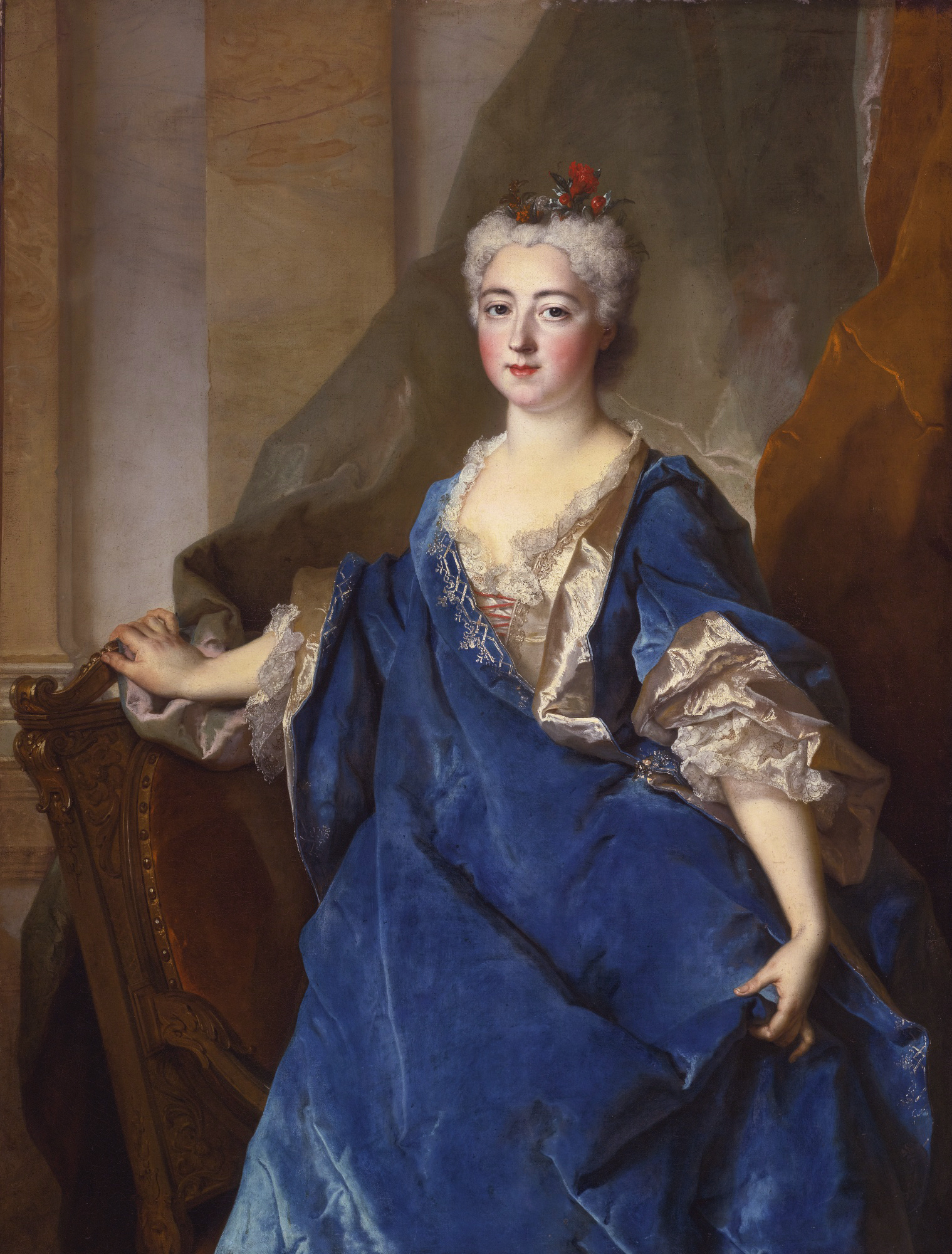
Katarzyna, Baronne de Besenval, née Bielińska (1684–1761), wife of Johann Viktor von Besenval and mother of Peter Viktor von Besenval. The second chapel was dedicated to Saint Michael in her honour. Saint Michael is a very revered saint in Poland. Portrayed by Nicolas de Largillière (1720)

The Waldegg Castle has two Catholic chapels. The eastern turret houses the Castle chapel. It has a high-Baroque altar from 1720, a trompe-l'œil ceiling fresco and wall frescoes attributed to either Wolfgang Aeby (1638–1694) or Michael Vogelsang (around 1663–1719). Both artists were locals from the Solothurn region. The apostolic nuncio in 1686 and the bishop in 1690 gave the authorisation for the celebration of the Holy Mass in the Castle chapel, which is dedicated to Saint Maurice.

==== Chapel of Saint Michael ====
The second chapel, the Chapel of Saint Michael, is a detached building. It is located in the inner courtyard of the castle, behind the spectacular main façade, opposite the castle entrance. The chapel was commissioned by Johann Viktor von Besenval in 1729 and completed in 1734. The chapel features high-quality reproduction paintings – made in Paris, including the large artfully carved gilded frames –, showing Saint Michael by Raphael and Saint Raphael by Domenico Fetti, the originals of which both hang in the Louvre.

The completion of the Chapel of Saint Michael took forever. This is also because they were unlucky with the craftsmen. Johann Viktor von Besenval's brother, who supervised the construction work in his absence, reported to him:

"I was unfortunate in the completion of the chapel and the chaplain's house; for it was then that I learned the bricklayer, with whom I had contracted for the execution of the works, had thrown himself into the river and drowned."

— Excerpt from a letter from Pierre Joseph von Besenval (1675–1736) to his brother Johann Viktor, dated November 1732

=== Garden, park and allée ===
At around 1700, Johann Viktor P. Joseph von Besenval still carried out major transformations on the south side of the castle by replacing the panoramic platform of the parterre with a staircase and a fountain. The south portal also dates from this period. He also planted the 600 meter long allée leading to the road to Basel. The allée, partially lost over time, was reconstructed in 1988 with Tilia platyphyllos trees. In 1705, Johann Viktor P. Joseph acquired a plot of forest from the authorities in order to expand his estate. He developed it into a baroque park and a formal garden.

== Gallery ==
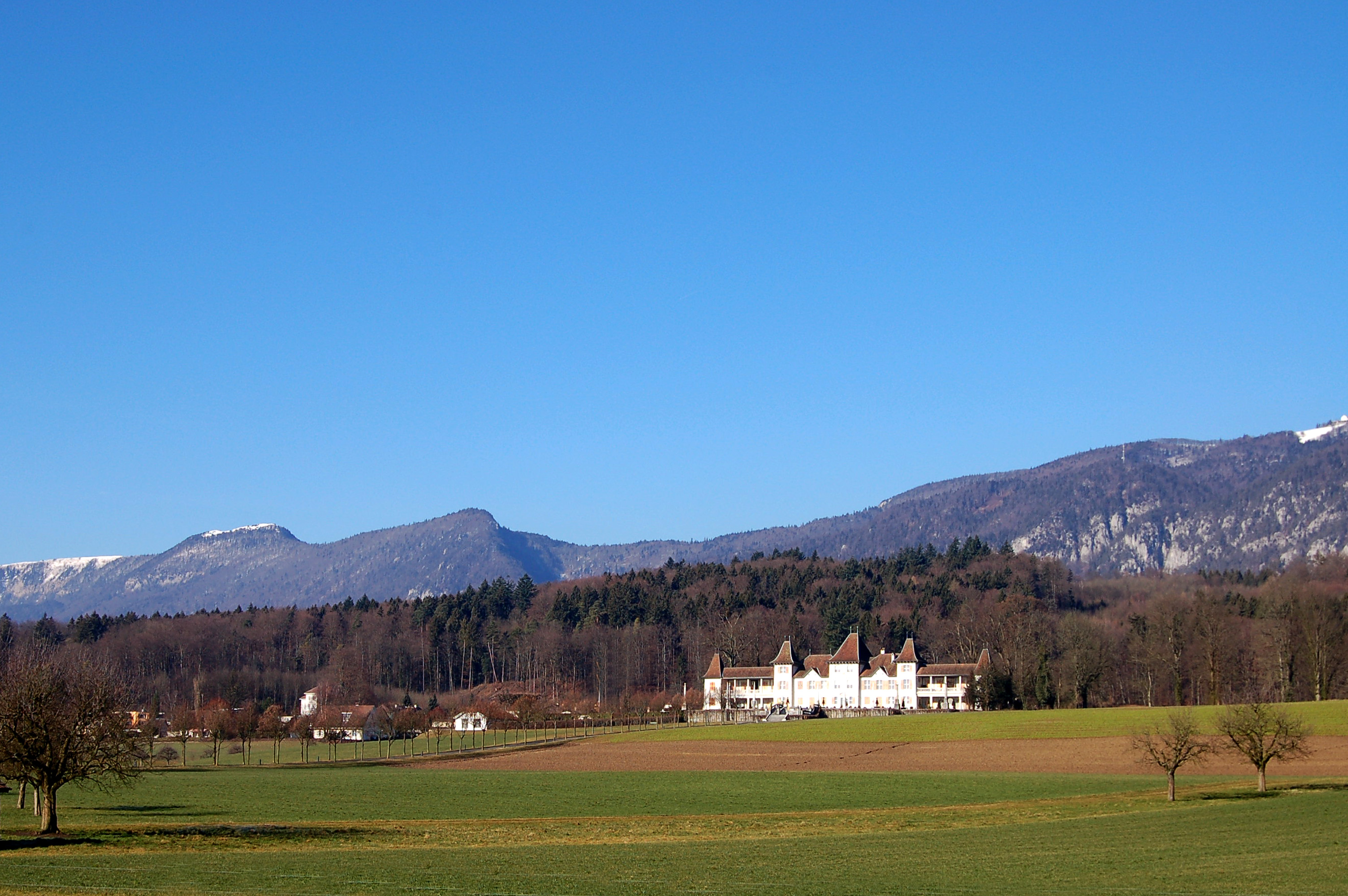
Waldegg Castle, surrounded by its estate land. The 78 meters long façade unfolds its effect of a coulisse

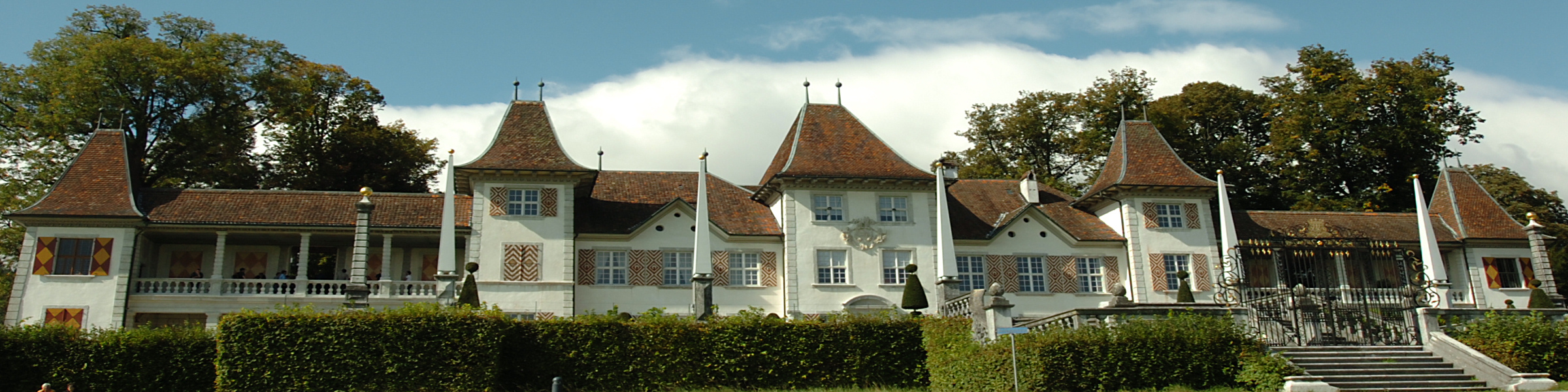
Waldegg Castle, panoramic view

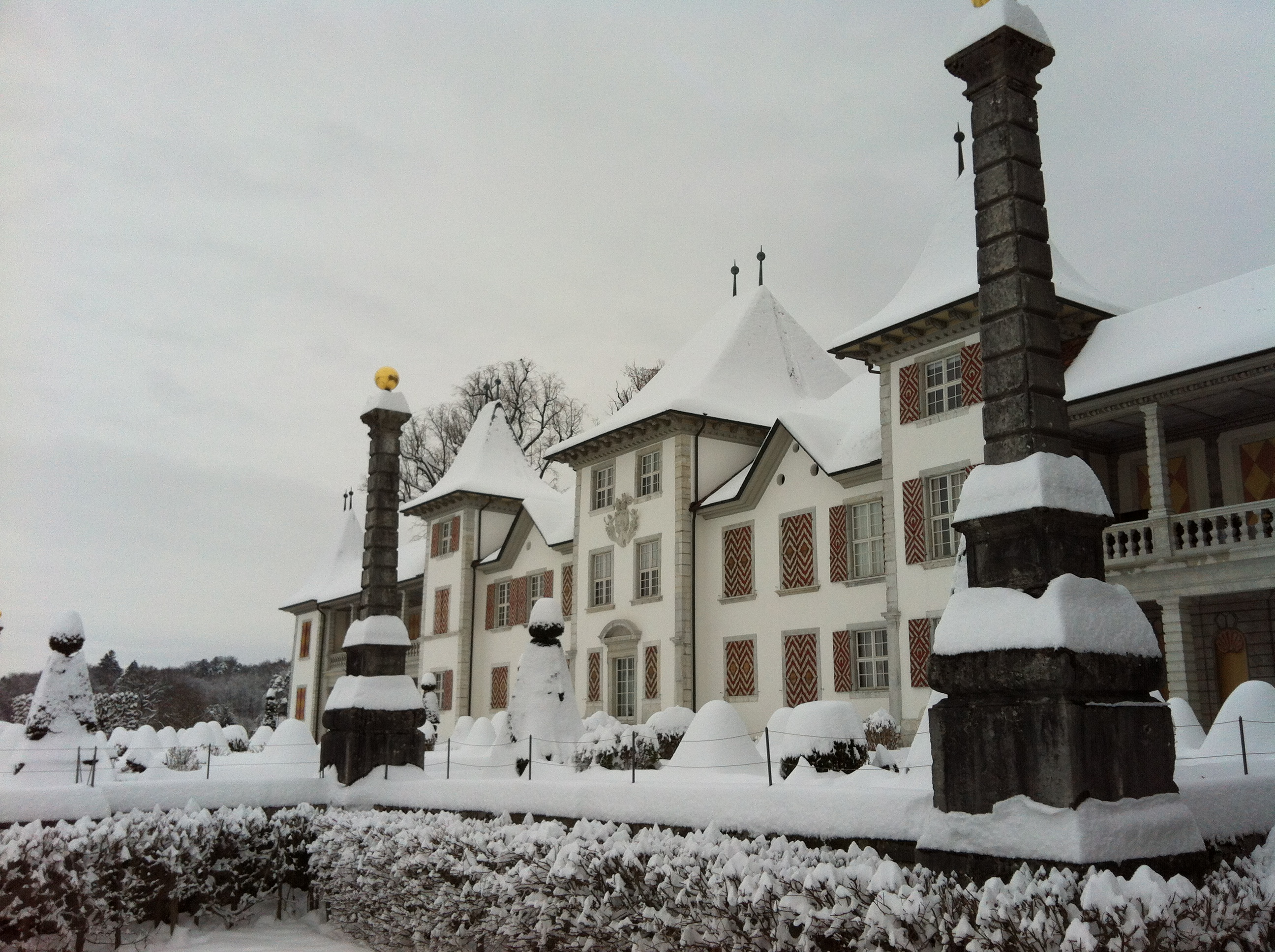
Waldegg Castle in winter
