= Brunstatt =

Commune in Haut-Rhin, France

Brunstatt Brunstatt / Brunscht
- Part of Brunstatt-Didenheim
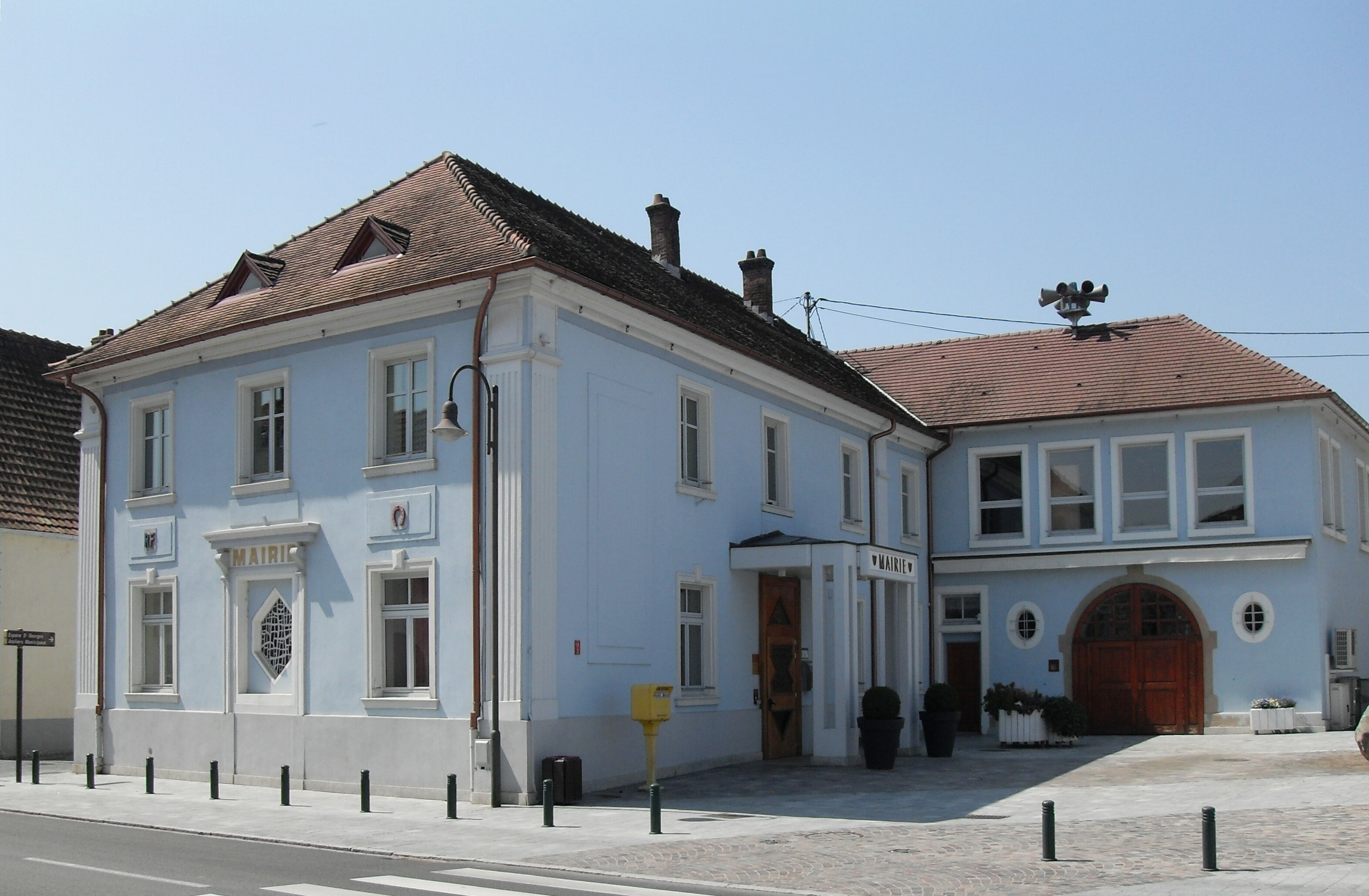
- Town hall

- Coat of arms
- Location of Brunstatt
- Location within France Location within Grand Est
- Coordinates: 47°43′26″N 7°19′24″E
- Country: France
- Region: Grand Est
- Department: Haut-Rhin
- Arrondissement: Mulhouse
- Canton: Brunstatt-Didenheim
- Commune: Brunstatt-Didenheim
- Area^{1}: 9.66 km^{2} (3.73 sq mi)
- Elevation: 245 m (804 ft)
- Highest elevation: 329 m (1,079 ft)
- Lowest elevation: 240 m (790 ft)
- Population (2022): 6,376
  - Density: 660/km^{2} (1,710/sq mi)
- Time zone: UTC+01:00 (CET)
  - Summer (DST): UTC+02:00 (CEST)
- Postal code: 68350
- ^{1} French Land Register data, which excludes lakes, ponds, glaciers > 1 km^{2} (0.386 sq mi or 247 acres) and river estuaries.

Brunstatt (French pronunciation: [bʁunʃtat]; Alsatian: Brunscht) is a former commune in the Haut-Rhin department in north-eastern France. On 1 January 2016, it was merged into the new commune Brunstatt-Didenheim.

It is one of the southern suburbs of the city of Mulhouse, and forms part of the Mulhouse Alsace Agglomération, the inter-communal local government body for the Mulhouse conurbation.

== House of Besenval: A Swiss family, well conntected ==
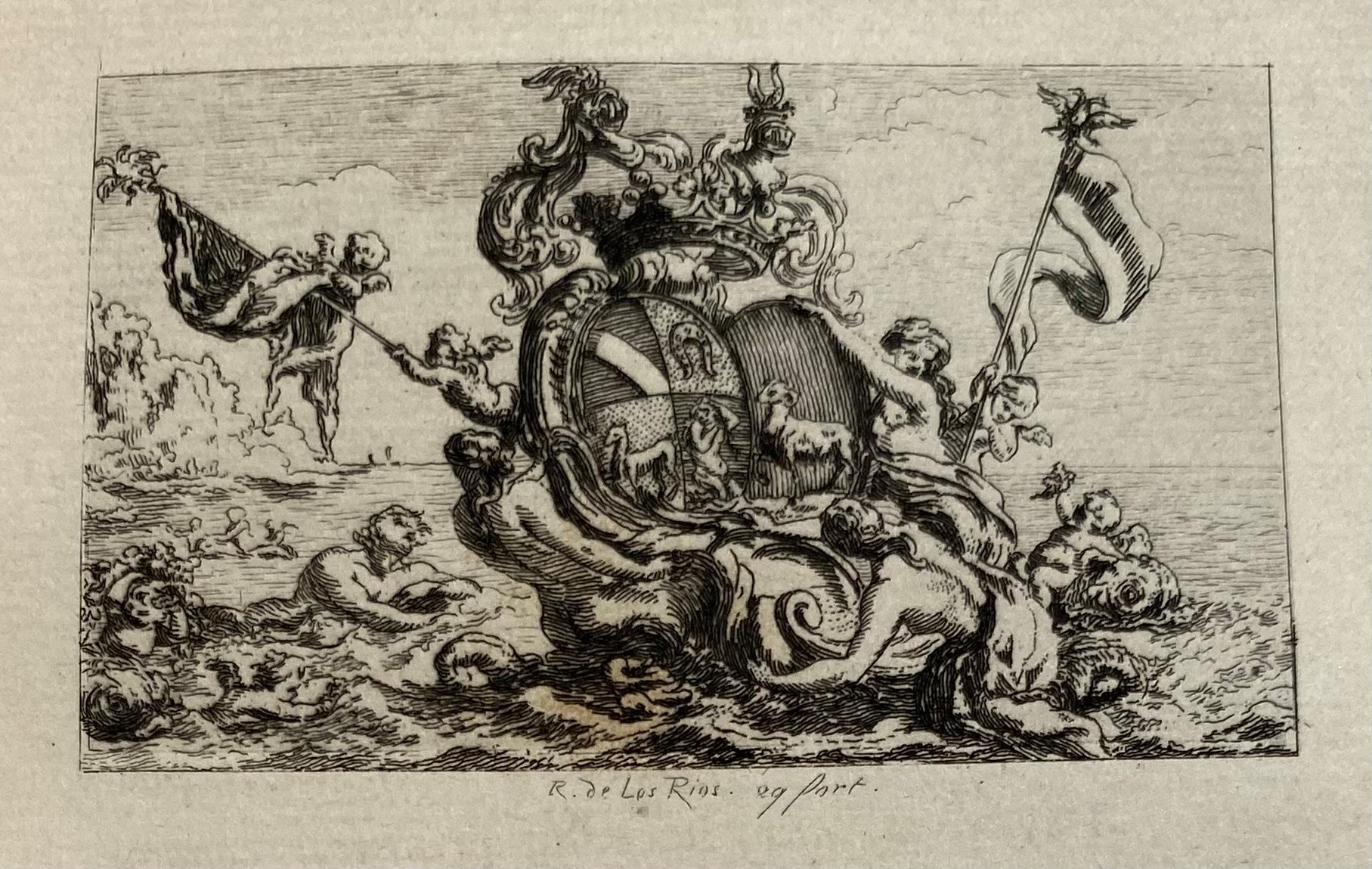
The arms of alliance of the families de Besenval (quartered shield) and Bieliński. The horseshoe represents the Barony of Brunstatt. The silver doe represents Riedisheim and the silver mermaid Didenheim, the two other possessions of the family de Besenval in the Alsace. The fourth quarter of the shield displays the Besenval family coat of arms, derived from the coat of arms of the municipality of Torgnon, the family's place of origin. Engraving by Ricardo de los Ríos.

The communes of Brunstatt, Didenheim and Riedisheim once belonged to the Swiss patrician family von Besenval or de Besenval as they were called in France. The rich and powerful family from Solothurn had considerable influence at the royal court of France. A striking illustration of this is the elevation of the family de Besenval's possession of Brunstatt to a French barony by the King of France on 11 August 1726, from which the family derived the title Baron de Besenval de Brunstatt.

=== Pierre Victor de Besenval de Brunstatt ===
One of the most prominent members of the family was Pierre Victor, Baron de Besenval de Brunstatt, a Swiss military officer in French service and a favorite of Queen Marie Antoinette. The baron received tout-Paris at his residence on the Rue de Grenelle, the Hôtel de Besenval. The hôtel particulier was also the setting for the affair known as: An Incident at the Opera Ball on Mardi Gras in 1778. The Hôtel de Besenval has housed the Embassy of the Swiss Confederation since 1938.

== See also ==
- Communes of the Haut-Rhin department
