= Emanuel Büchel =

- Born: August 18, 1705
- Died: September 24, 1775 (aged 70)
- Occupation: painter

Emanuel Büchel (August 18, 1705 – September 24, 1775) was a Swiss painter.

Büchel's watercolor paintings are known for their use of bright colors. The high point of his career came in 1773, when he was commissioned to reproduce the painting 'The Dance of Death' in Basel. The project was difficult to execute, because the original painting had undergone countless renovations and changes, and was damaged to a great extent. Although Büchel worked on it and gave the painting his characteristic touch of vivacious colors, the painting's poor condition meant that it only survived 32 years after Büchel's renovations.

Another of Büchel's works, the 'Dance of Death' on the wall of the Kleinbasel churchyard, has survived. Situated inside an abandoned nunnery, the mural has had better protection against weather, wear and tear, iconoclasms, and renovations than some of Büchel's other works. Although the mural is only an imitation of a medieval painting that Büchel saw in 1768, it has acquired special significance since the original painting has now been lost. Büchel's work, therefore, is the only source for ascertaining what the original painting looked like. Büchel created two sets of his water colors. One is housed in Kunstsammlung Basel and the other is in the university's library.

== Gallery ==
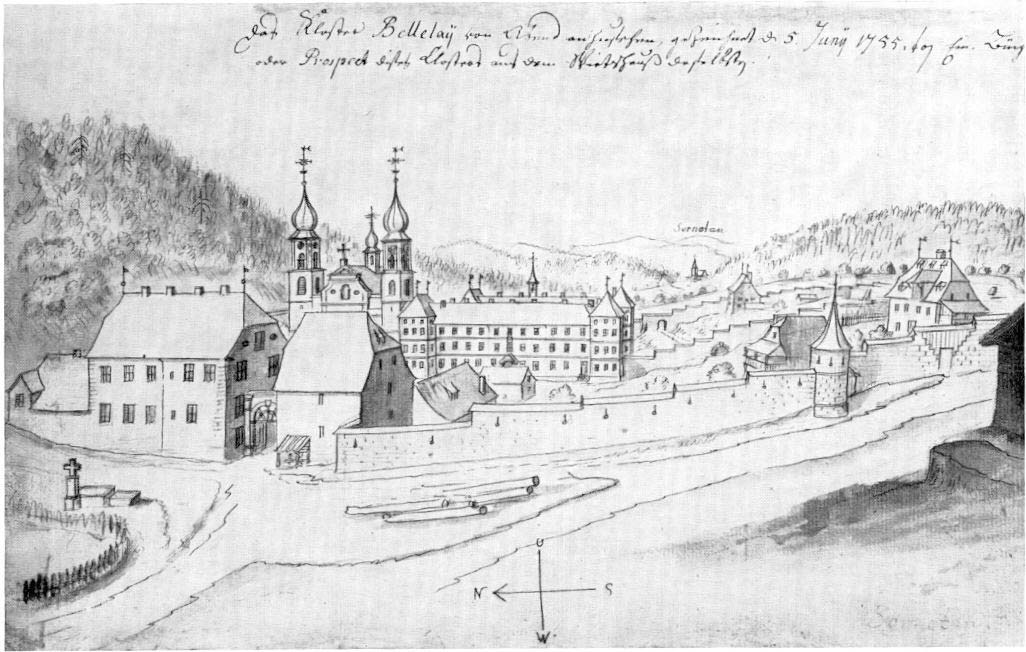
Bellelay Abbey, 1755

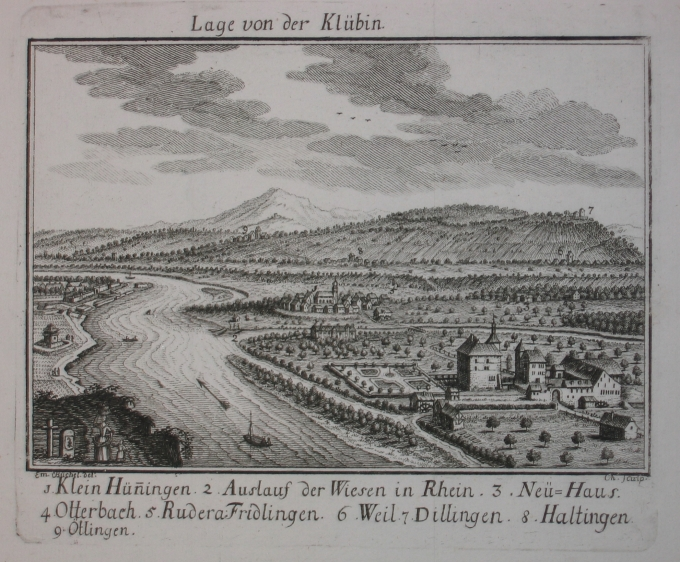
Schloss Klybeck, Basel, 1750

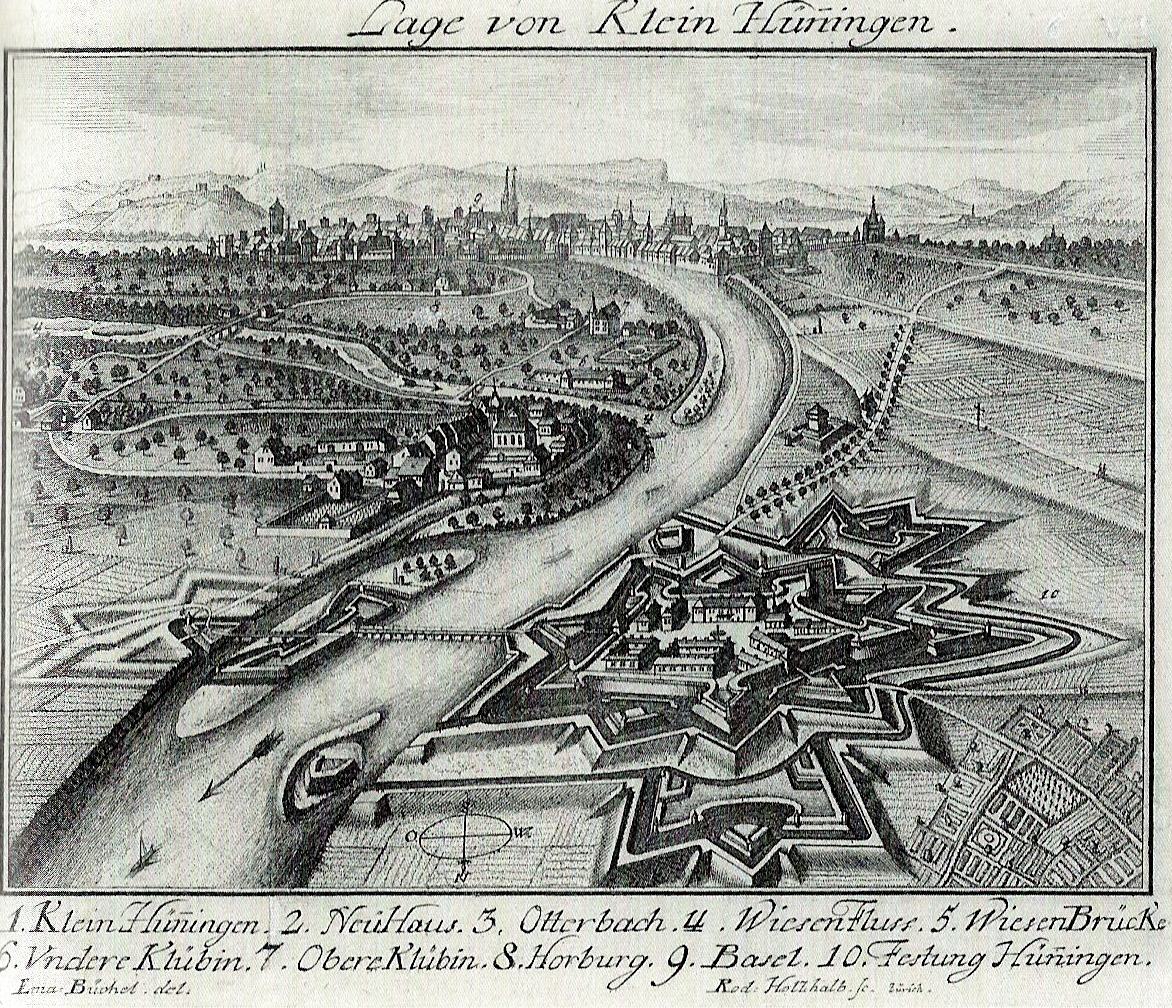
Basel-Kleinhüningen, 1749

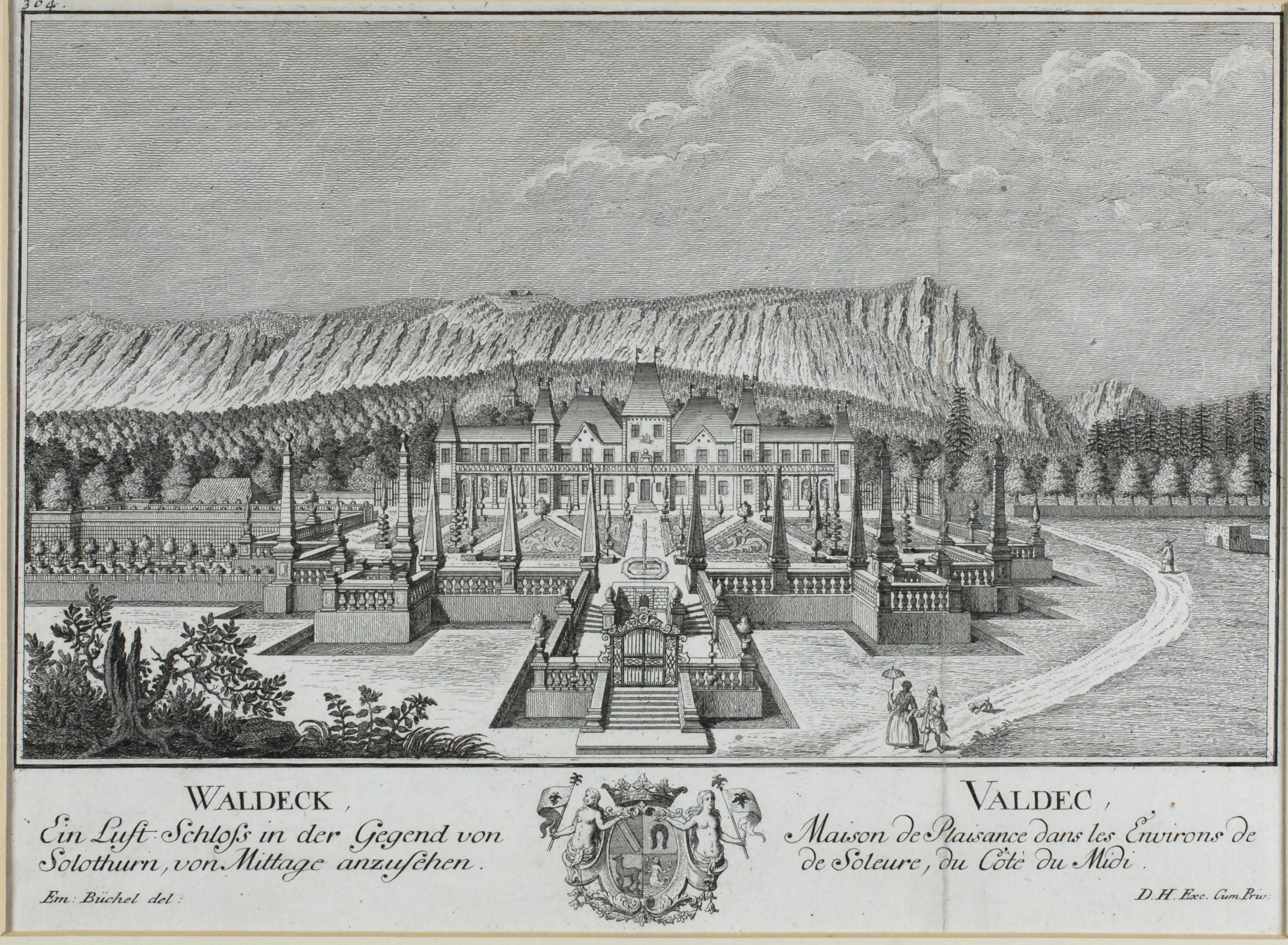
Waldegg Castle, around 1760
