= Brunstatt-Didenheim =

Commune in Grand Est, France

Brunstatt-Didenheim Brunst-Dìdana (Alemannic German)
- Commune
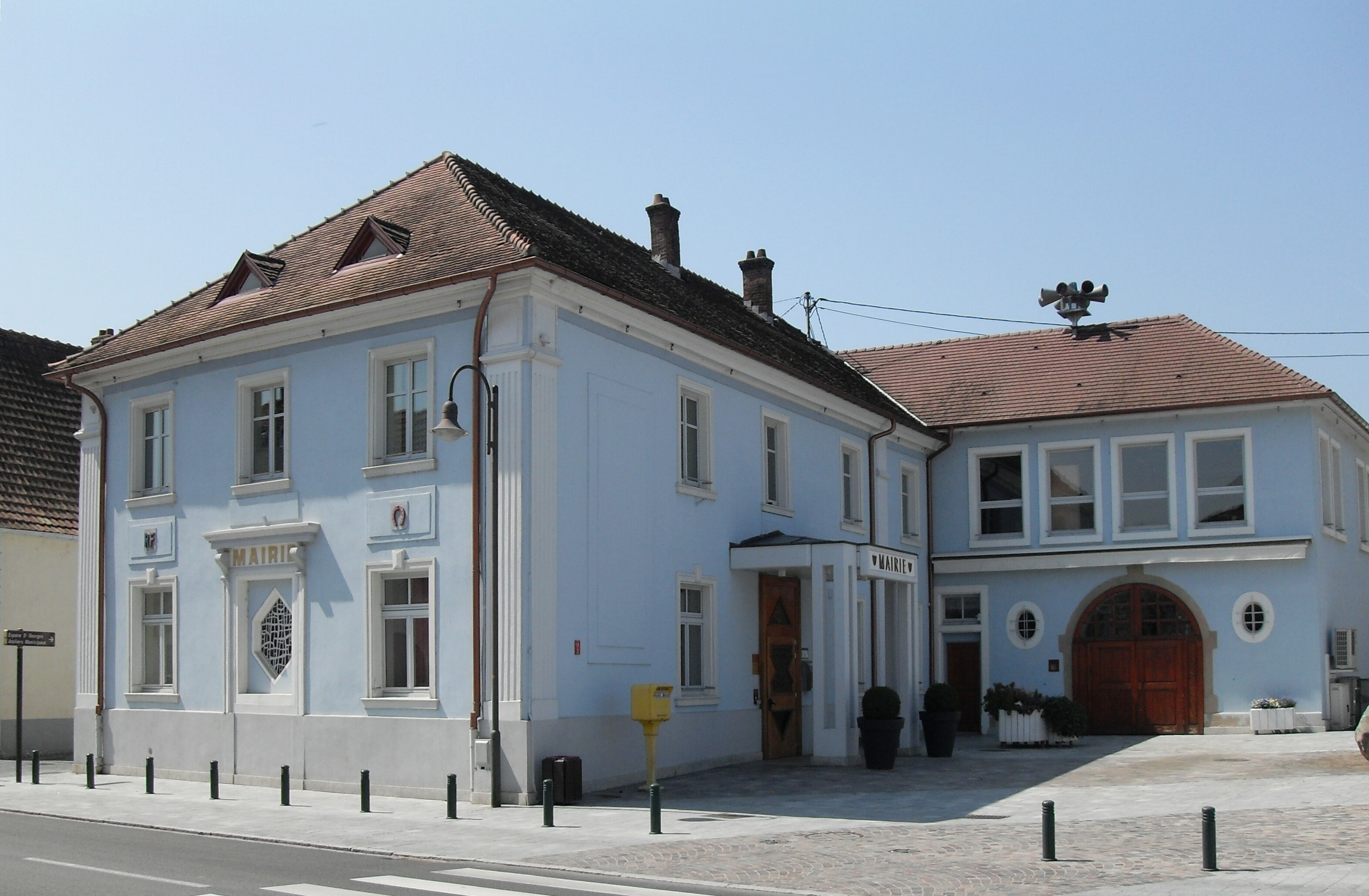
- The town hall in Brunstatt
- Location of Brunstatt-Didenheim
- Location within France Location within Grand Est
- Coordinates: 47°43′16″N 7°19′05″E
- Country: France
- Region: Grand Est
- Department: Haut-Rhin
- Arrondissement: Mulhouse
- Canton: Brunstatt-Didenheim
- Intercommunality: CA Mulhouse Alsace Agglomération

Government
  - Mayor (2020–2026): Antoine Viola
- Area^{1}: 14.10 km^{2} (5.44 sq mi)
- Population (2023): 8,259
  - Density: 585.7/km^{2} (1,517/sq mi)
- Time zone: UTC+01:00 (CET)
  - Summer (DST): UTC+02:00 (CEST)
- INSEE/Postal code: 68056 /68350
- ^{1} French Land Register data, which excludes lakes, ponds, glaciers > 1 km^{2} (0.386 sq mi or 247 acres) and river estuaries.

Brunstatt-Didenheim, in Alsatian Brunst-Dìdana, is a commune in the Haut-Rhin department of northeastern France. The municipality was established on 1 January 2016 and consists of the former communes of Brunstatt and Didenheim.

== Population ==
The population data given in the table below refers to the commune in its geography as of January 2025.

Historical population
Year	Pop.	±% p.a.
1968	6,321	—
1975	6,967	+1.40%
1982	6,789	−0.37%
1990	6,931	+0.26%
1999	7,294	+0.57%
2007	7,849	+0.92%
2012	7,853	+0.01%
2017	8,012	+0.40%
2023	8,259	+0.51%
Source: INSEE

== See also ==
- Communes of the Haut-Rhin department
