= Feldbrunnen-St. Niklaus =

- Municipality
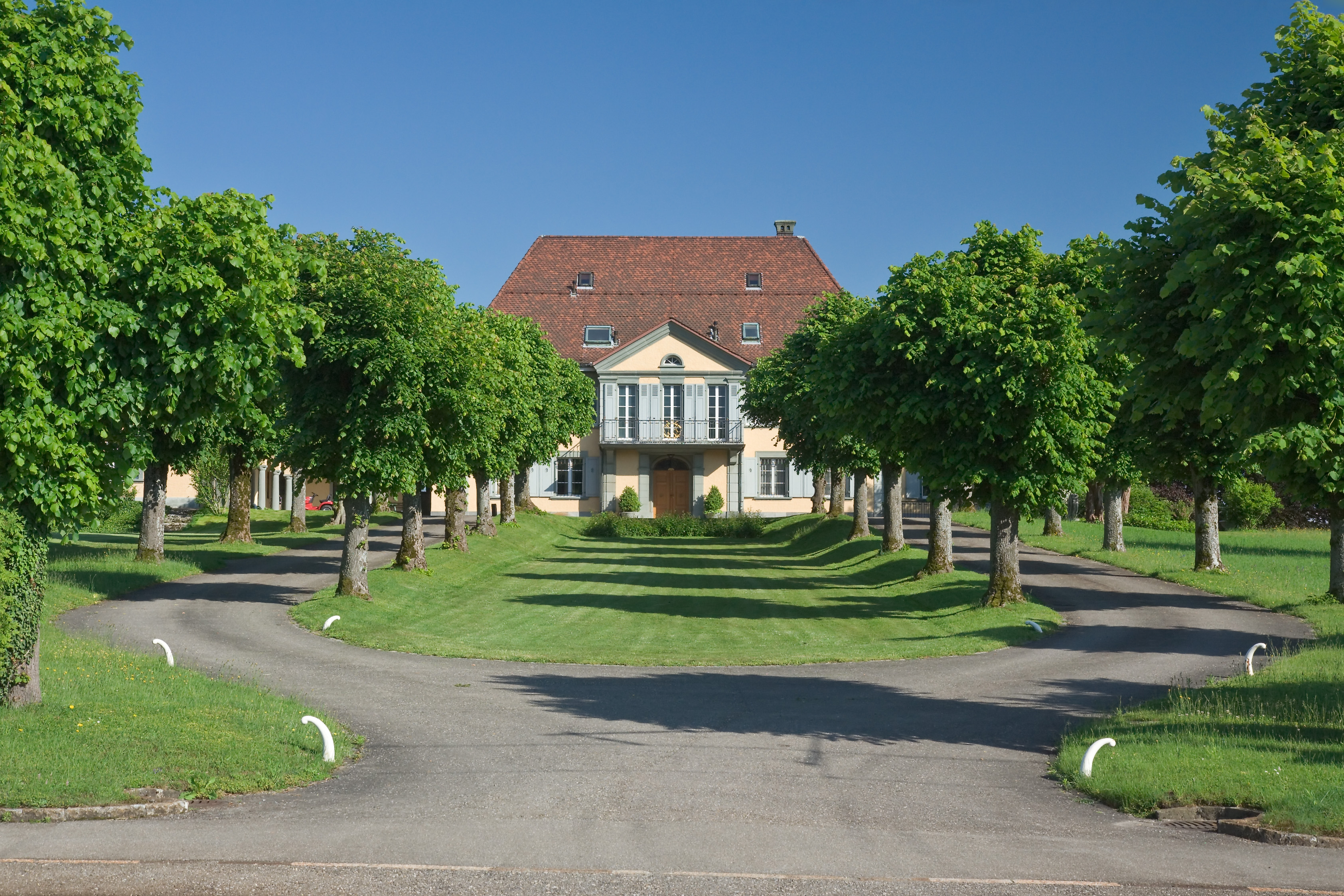
- House in Feldbrunnen

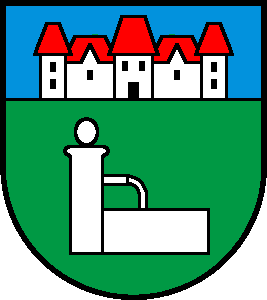
- Coat of arms
- Location of Feldbrunnen-St. Niklaus
- Location within Switzerland Location within Canton of Solothurn
- Coordinates: 47°13′N 7°33′E
- Country: Switzerland
- Canton: Solothurn
- District: Lebern

Area
  - Total: 2.5 km^{2} (0.97 sq mi)
- Elevation: 452 m (1,483 ft)

Population (December 2020)
  - Total: 975
  - Density: 390/km^{2} (1,000/sq mi)
- Time zone: UTC+01:00 (CET)
  - Summer (DST): UTC+02:00 (CEST)
- Postal code: 4532
- SFOS number: 2544
- ISO 3166 code: CH-SO
- Surrounded by: Riedholz, Rüttenen, Solothurn, Zuchwil
- Website: www.feldbrunnen.ch

Feldbrunnen-St. Niklaus is a municipality in the district of Lebern in the canton of Solothurn in Switzerland.

== History ==
Feldbrunnen-St. Niklaus is first mentioned in 1319 as Velbrunnen.

== Geography ==
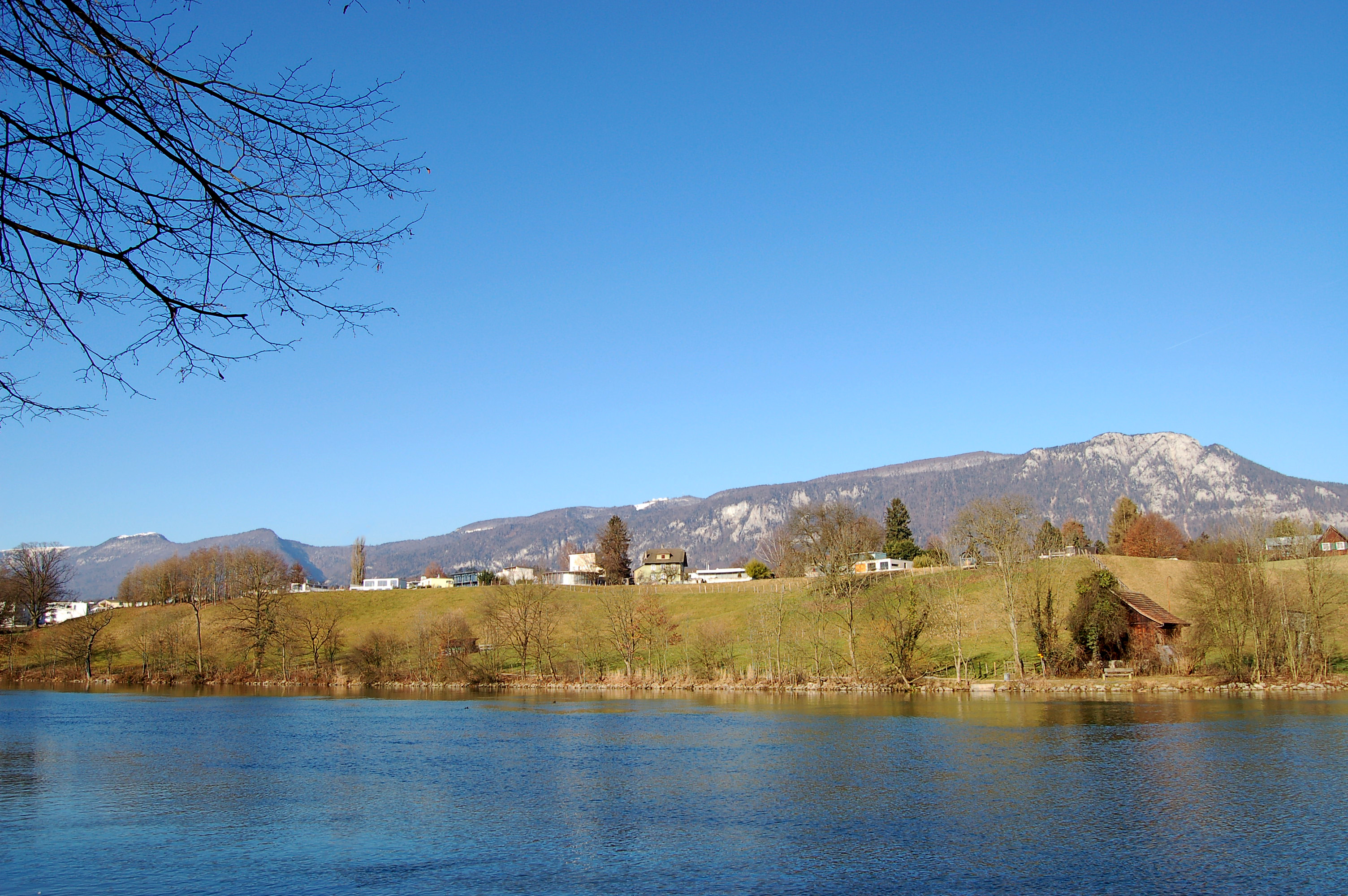
Feldbrunnen

Feldbrunnen-St. Niklaus has an area, as of 2009, of 2.5 square kilometers (0.97 sq mi). Of this area, 0.92 km^{2} (0.36 sq mi) or 36.8% is used for agricultural purposes, while 1.15 km^{2} (0.44 sq mi) or 46.0% is forested. Of the rest of the land, 0.37 km^{2} (0.14 sq mi) or 14.8% is settled (buildings or roads), 0.05 km^{2} (12 acres) or 2.0% is either rivers or lakes.

Of the built up area, housing and buildings made up 8.4% and transportation infrastructure made up 6.0%. Out of the forested land, 44.4% of the total land area is heavily forested and 1.6% is covered with orchards or small clusters of trees. Of the agricultural land, 26.0% is used for growing crops and 10.4% is pastures. All the water in the municipality is flowing water.

The municipality is located in the Lebern district, in the southern foothills of the Jura Mountains, east of Solothurn.

== Coat of arms ==
The blazon of the municipal coat of arms is Vert a Fontain natural Argent and in a Chief Azure a castle Argent roofed Gules.

== Demographics ==
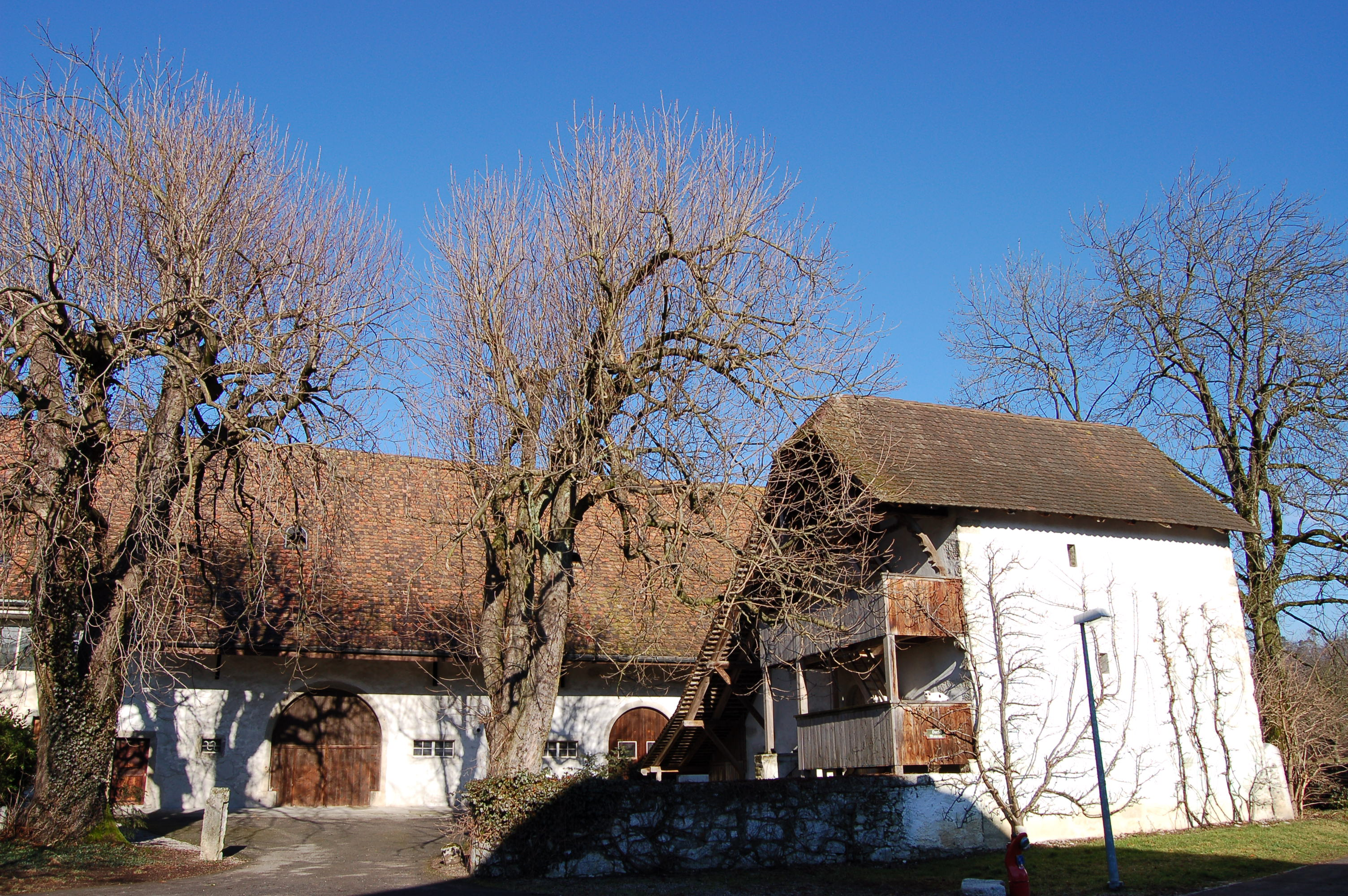
Feldbrunnen village museum

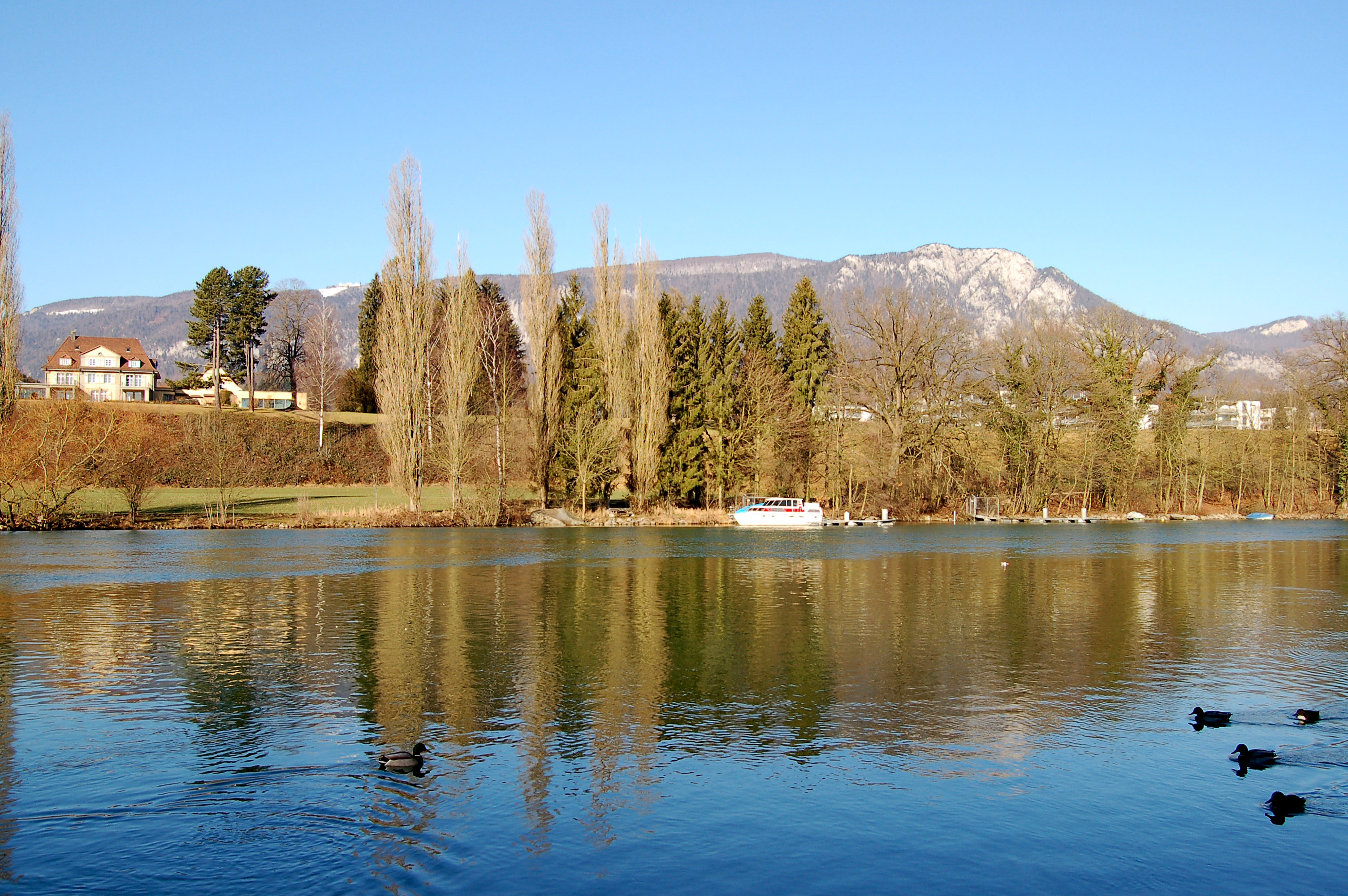
Feldbrunnen from the south

Feldbrunnen-St. Niklaus has a population (as of December 2020) of 975. As of 2008, 7.2% of the population are resident foreign nationals. Over the last 10 years (1999–2009 ) the population has changed at a rate of 18.6%.

Most of the population (as of 2000) speaks German (728 or 96.3%), with Italian being second most common (8 or 1.1%) and French being third (6 or 0.8%).

As of 2008, the gender distribution of the population was 48.6% male and 51.4% female. The population was made up of 420 Swiss men (45.5% of the population) and 29 (3.1%) non-Swiss men. There were 441 Swiss women (47.8%) and 33 (3.6%) non-Swiss women. Of the population in the municipality 124 or about 16.4% were born in Feldbrunnen-St. Niklaus and lived there in 2000. There were 322 or 42.6% who were born in the same canton, while 231 or 30.6% were born somewhere else in Switzerland, and 65 or 8.6% were born outside of Switzerland.

In 2008 there were 7 live births to Swiss citizens and were 6 deaths of Swiss citizens. Ignoring immigration and emigration, the population of Swiss citizens increased by 1 while the foreign population remained the same. There was 1 Swiss woman who emigrated from Switzerland. At the same time, there was 1 non-Swiss man and 1 non-Swiss woman who immigrated from another country to Switzerland. The total Swiss population change in 2008 (from all sources, including moves across municipal borders) was an increase of 28 and the non-Swiss population increased by 5 people. This represents a population growth rate of 3.7%.

As of 2000, there were 252 people who were single and never married in the municipality. There were 407 married individuals, 64 widows or widowers and 33 individuals who are divorced.

As of 2000, there were 340 private households in the municipality, and an average of 2.2 persons per household. There were 109 households that consist of only one person and 18 households with five or more people. Out of a total of 344 households that answered this question, 31.7% were households made up of just one person and there were 1 adults who lived with their parents. Of the rest of the households, there are 123 married couples without children, 86 married couples with children There were 12 single parents with a child or children. There were 9 households that were made up of unrelated people and 4 households that were made up of some sort of institution or another collective housing.

In 2000 there were 129 single family homes (or 65.5% of the total) out of a total of 197 inhabited buildings. There were 47 multi-family buildings (23.9%), along with 16 multi-purpose buildings that were mostly used for housing (8.1%) and 5 other use buildings (commercial or industrial) that also had some housing (2.5%). Of the single family homes 8 were built before 1919, while 26 were built between 1990 and 2000. The greatest number of single family homes (33) were built between 1971 and 1980.

In 2000 there were 379 apartments in the municipality. The most common apartment size was 4 rooms of which there were 112. There were 6 single room apartments and 173 apartments with five or more rooms. Of these apartments, a total of 337 apartments (88.9% of the total) were permanently occupied, while 30 apartments (7.9%) were seasonally occupied and 12 apartments (3.2%) were empty. As of 2009, the construction rate of new housing units was 5.4 new units per 1000 residents. The vacancy rate for the municipality, in 2010, was 0.92%.

The historical population is given in the following chart:

== Heritage sites of national significance ==
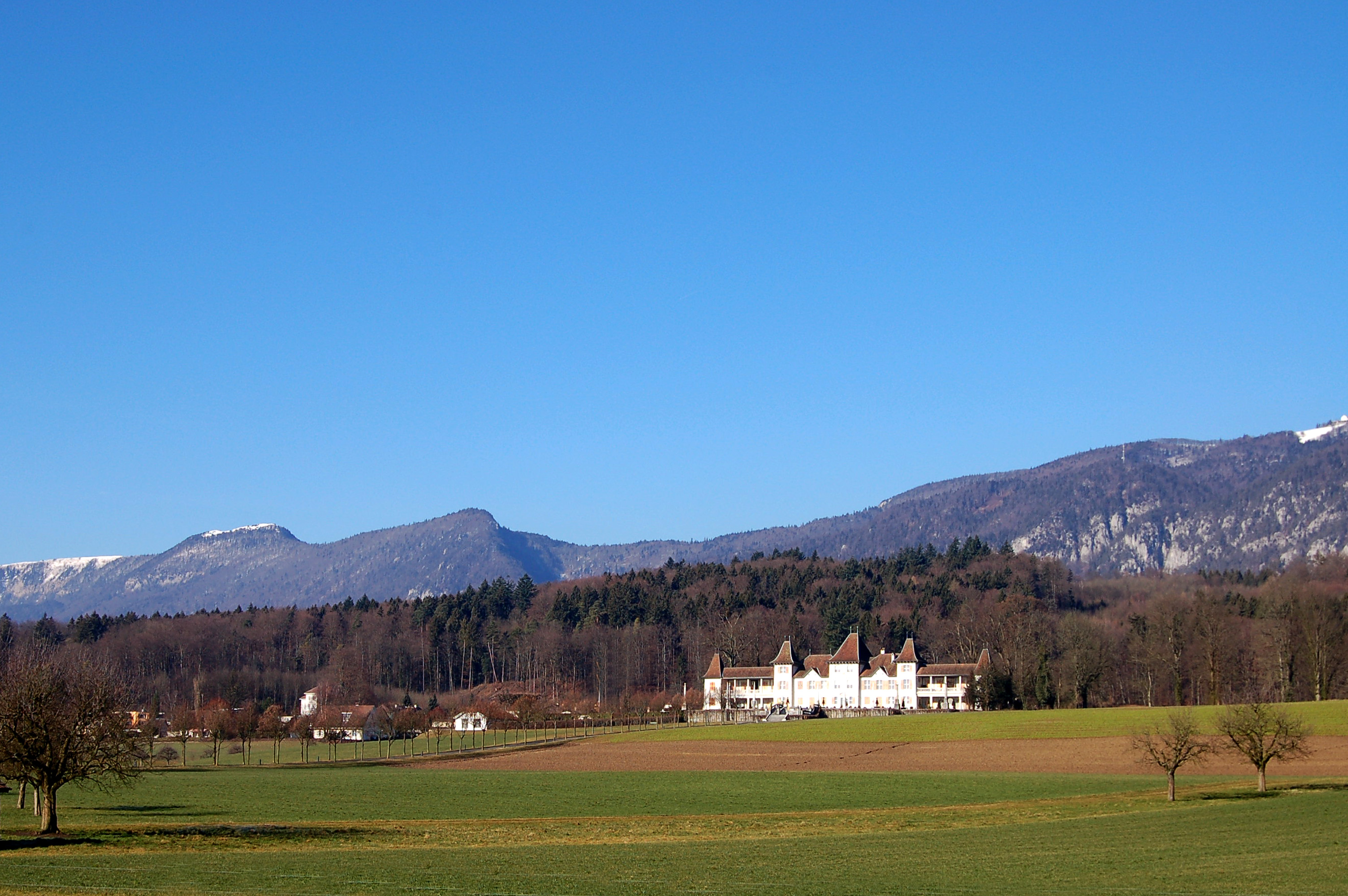
Waldegg Castle

Waldegg Castle is listed as a Swiss heritage site of national significance. The entire Waldegg and Feldbrunnnen-St. Niklaus area is part of the Inventory of Swiss Heritage Sites.

== Politics ==
In the 2007 federal election the most popular party was the FDP which received 32.26% of the vote. The next three most popular parties were the SVP (25.56%), the CVP (22.29%) and the SP (10.34%). In the federal election, a total of 473 votes were cast, and the voter turnout was 67.5%.

== Economy ==
As of 2010, Feldbrunnen-St. Niklaus had an unemployment rate of 2.2%. As of 2008, there were 9 people employed in the primary economic sector and about 3 businesses involved in this sector. 59 people were employed in the secondary sector and there were 8 businesses in this sector. 127 people were employed in the tertiary sector, with 38 businesses in this sector. There were 394 residents of the municipality who were employed in some capacity, of which females made up 44.2% of the workforce.

In 2008 the total number of full-time equivalent jobs was 149. The number of jobs in the primary sector was 6, all of which were in agriculture. The number of jobs in the secondary sector was 55 of which 18 or (32.7%) were in manufacturing and 33 (60.0%) were in construction. The number of jobs in the tertiary sector was 88. In the tertiary sector; 9 or 10.2% were in wholesale or retail sales or the repair of motor vehicles, 1 was in the movement and storage of goods, 14 or 15.9% were in a hotel or restaurant, 11 or 12.5% were in the information industry, 2 or 2.3% were the insurance or financial industry, 23 or 26.1% were technical professionals or scientists and 3 or 3.4% were in health care.

In 2000, there were 89 workers who commuted into the municipality and 337 workers who commuted away. The municipality is a net exporter of workers, with about 3.8 workers leaving the municipality for every one entering. Of the working population, 14.5% used public transportation to get to work, and 66% used a private car.

== Religion ==
From the 2000 census, 319 or 42.2% were Roman Catholic, while 262 or 34.7% belonged to the Swiss Reformed Church. Of the rest of the population, there were 7 members of an Orthodox church (or about 0.93% of the population), there were 8 individuals (or about 1.06% of the population) who belonged to the Christian Catholic Church, and there were 12 individuals (or about 1.59% of the population) who belonged to another Christian church. There were 4 (or about 0.53% of the population) who were Islamic. 132 (or about 17.46% of the population) belonged to no church, are agnostic or atheist, and 12 individuals (or about 1.59% of the population) did not answer the question.

== Education ==
In Feldbrunnen-St. Niklaus about 322 or (42.6%) of the population have completed non-mandatory upper secondary education, and 175 or (23.1%) have completed additional higher education (either university or a Fachhochschule). Of the 175 who completed tertiary schooling, 78.3% were Swiss men, 20.0% were Swiss women.

As of 2000, there were 84 students from Feldbrunnen-St. Niklaus who attended schools outside the municipality.
