= Ricardo de los Ríos =

Spanish artist (1846–1929)

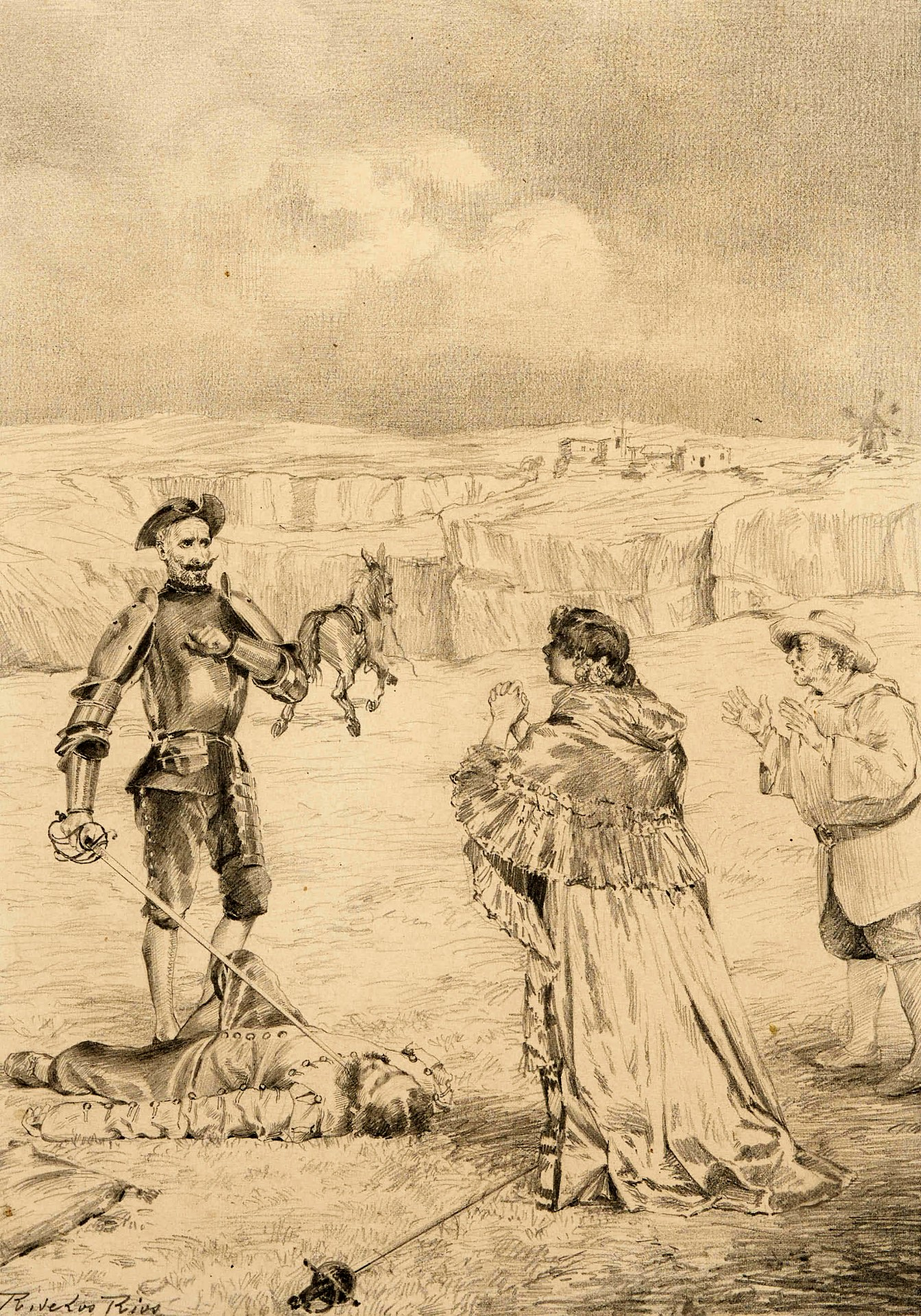
A Scene from Don Quixote

Ricardo de los Ríos (1846, Valladolid – May 1929, Madrid) was a Spanish painter, engraver, etcher and illustrator. He spent most of his early career in Paris.

== Biography ==
He studied painting with Isidore Pils, at the École des Beaux-Arts de Paris. His initial works comprised battle scenes, portraits, still-lifes and interiors, as well as copies of the masters. His first exhibit came at the Salon of 1867. Three years later, he was able to open a studio on the Boulevard du Montparnasse.

Most of his oeuvre consists of etchings. He is known to have associated with the group of etchers led by Alfred Cadart, founder of the Société des Aquafortistes, and may have been given lessons by one of its members. Several of his works appeared in Cadart's publications from 1876 to 1881.

He became an associate member of the Société des Artistes Français, and exhibited at their salon until 1899; as well as with the Société Nationale des Beaux-Arts from 1890 to 1894. He was awarded a silver medal at the Exposition Universelle (1889), and had a small showing at the World's Columbian Exposition in Chicago (1893). For several years, he was represented in the United States by the famous Knoedler art dealership.

In 1899, he returned to Spain, where he succeeded José María Galván as Professor of Engraving at the Real Academia de Bellas Artes de San Fernando, in Madrid. He apparently did very little original work after that.

He is primarily remembered for his etched illustrations of classic works; by Cervantes, Victor Hugo, Balzac and Alain-René Lesage, among others. He also did engraved portraits of notable people, such as Garibaldi and Pasteur, as well as his fellow Spanish artists.
