= Didenheim =

Commune in Haut-Rhin, France

- Part of Brunstatt-Didenheim
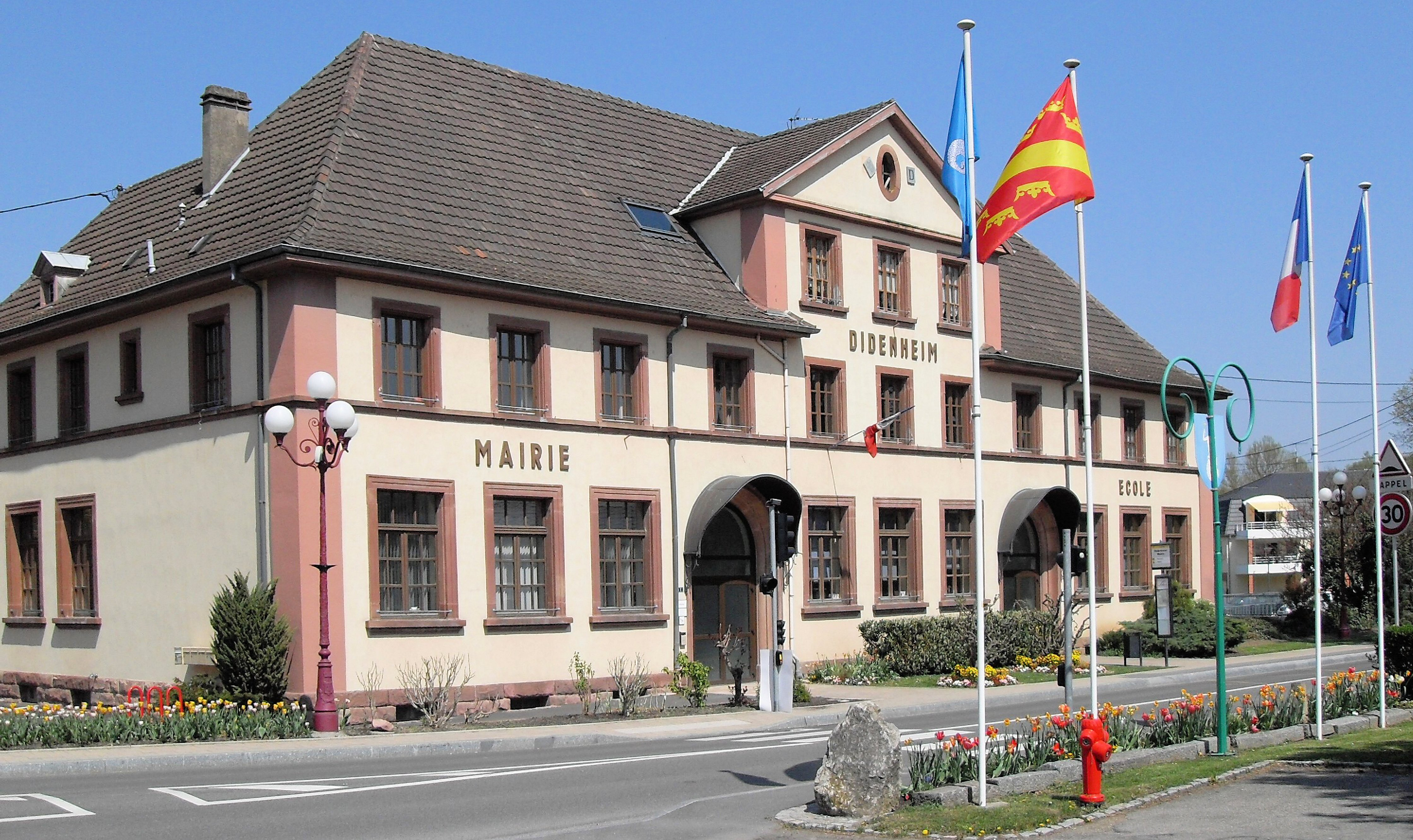
- Town hall

- Flag Coat of arms
- Location of Didenheim
- Location within France Location within Grand Est
- Coordinates: 47°43′11″N 7°18′06″E
- Country: France
- Region: Grand Est
- Department: Haut-Rhin
- Arrondissement: Mulhouse
- Canton: Brunstatt-Didenheim
- Commune: Brunstatt-Didenheim
- Area^{1}: 4.44 km^{2} (1.71 sq mi)
- Elevation: 250 m (820 ft)
- Highest elevation: 332 m (1,089 ft)
- Lowest elevation: 242 m (794 ft)
- Population (2022): 1,800
  - Density: 410/km^{2} (1,000/sq mi)
- Time zone: UTC+01:00 (CET)
  - Summer (DST): UTC+02:00 (CEST)
- Postal code: 68350
- ^{1} French Land Register data, which excludes lakes, ponds, glaciers > 1 km^{2} (0.386 sq mi or 247 acres) and river estuaries.

Didenheim (French pronunciation: [didənaim]; Alsatian: Didena) is a former commune in the Haut-Rhin department in north-eastern France. On 1 January 2016, it was merged into the new commune Brunstatt-Didenheim. It forms part of the Mulhouse Alsace Agglomération, the inter-communal local government body for the Mulhouse conurbation.

== See also ==
- Communes of the Haut-Rhin department
