= Rixheim =

Commune in Grand Est, France

Rixheim Rìxa (Alsatian)
- Commune
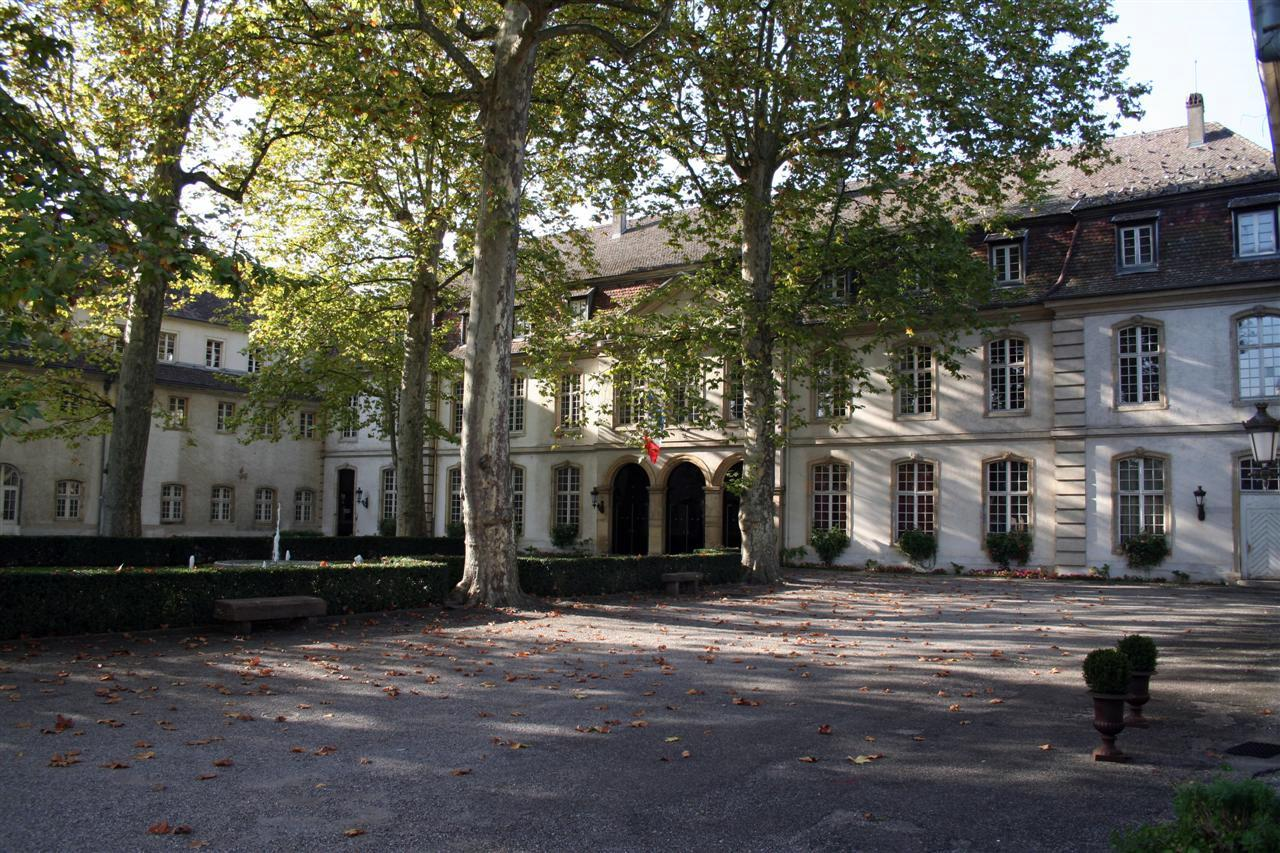
- The commandery in Rixheim

- Coat of arms
- Location of Rixheim
- Location within France Location within Grand Est
- Coordinates: 47°44′58″N 7°24′19″E
- Country: France
- Region: Grand Est
- Department: Haut-Rhin
- Arrondissement: Mulhouse
- Canton: Rixheim
- Intercommunality: Mulhouse Alsace Agglomération

Government
  - Mayor (2020–2026): Rachel Baechtel
- Area^{1}: 19.53 km^{2} (7.54 sq mi)
- Highest elevation: 366 m (1,201 ft)
- Lowest elevation: 232 m (761 ft)
- Population (2023): 14,380
  - Density: 736.3/km^{2} (1,907/sq mi)
- Time zone: UTC+01:00 (CET)
  - Summer (DST): UTC+02:00 (CEST)
- INSEE/Postal code: 68278 /68170
- ^{1} French Land Register data, which excludes lakes, ponds, glaciers > 1 km^{2} (0.386 sq mi or 247 acres) and river estuaries.

Rixheim (French pronunciation: [ʁiksaim]; Alsatian: Rìxa, pronounced [ˈʁɪksa]) is a commune in the Haut-Rhin department in Grand Est in northeastern France. It forms part of the Mulhouse Alsace Agglomération, the inter-communal local government body for the Mulhouse conurbation.

== Geography ==
Rixheim lies 5 kilometers east from the city center of Mulhouse, at the crossroads of Strasbourg and Mulhouse (A35-A36 to Sausheim) and Habsheim to Ottmarsheim (ancient Roman roads), the municipality of Rixheim is located in a loop of the Rhine ditch on the borders of the Hardt forest, the Sundgauvian hills and the alluvial plain of the Jll. The altitudes vary between 365 meters (Zürenwald) and 232 meters (Pont du Bouc). Rixheim lies six Kilometer east of Mulhouse.

There was a commendam of the Teutonic Order, their buildings preserved to this day, were built by Johann Caspar Bagnato. It was under the command of the commendam Altshausen.

=== Neighbouring communes ===
The neighbouring communes of Rixheim are, clockwise, starting in the north:

- Sausheim
- Ottmarsheim
- Hombourg
- Zimmersheim
- Habsheim
- Bruebach
- Riedisheim
- Illzach

== Population ==
Historical population
Year	Pop.	±% p.a.
1968	5,723	—
1975	8,419	+5.67%
1982	10,718	+3.51%
1990	11,669	+1.07%
1999	12,608	+0.86%
2007	13,103	+0.48%
2012	13,632	+0.79%
2017	13,902	+0.39%
2023	14,380	+0.57%
Source: INSEE

== Education ==
Rixheim has a public secondary school, the College Captain Dreyfus. It also has 4 elementary schools.

== Twin towns ==
- Lohne, Germany, Niedersachsen, Germany (since 1987)
- San Vito al Tagliamento, Friuli-Venezia Giulia, Italy
- Kanton Valence-sur-Baïse, Midi-Pyrénées, France

== Notable places ==
- The former Commandery of the Teutonic Order
- The Saint-Léger church, with organ and the old presbytery
- Fountain of John of Nepomuk
- War memorial
- The museum of wallpaper
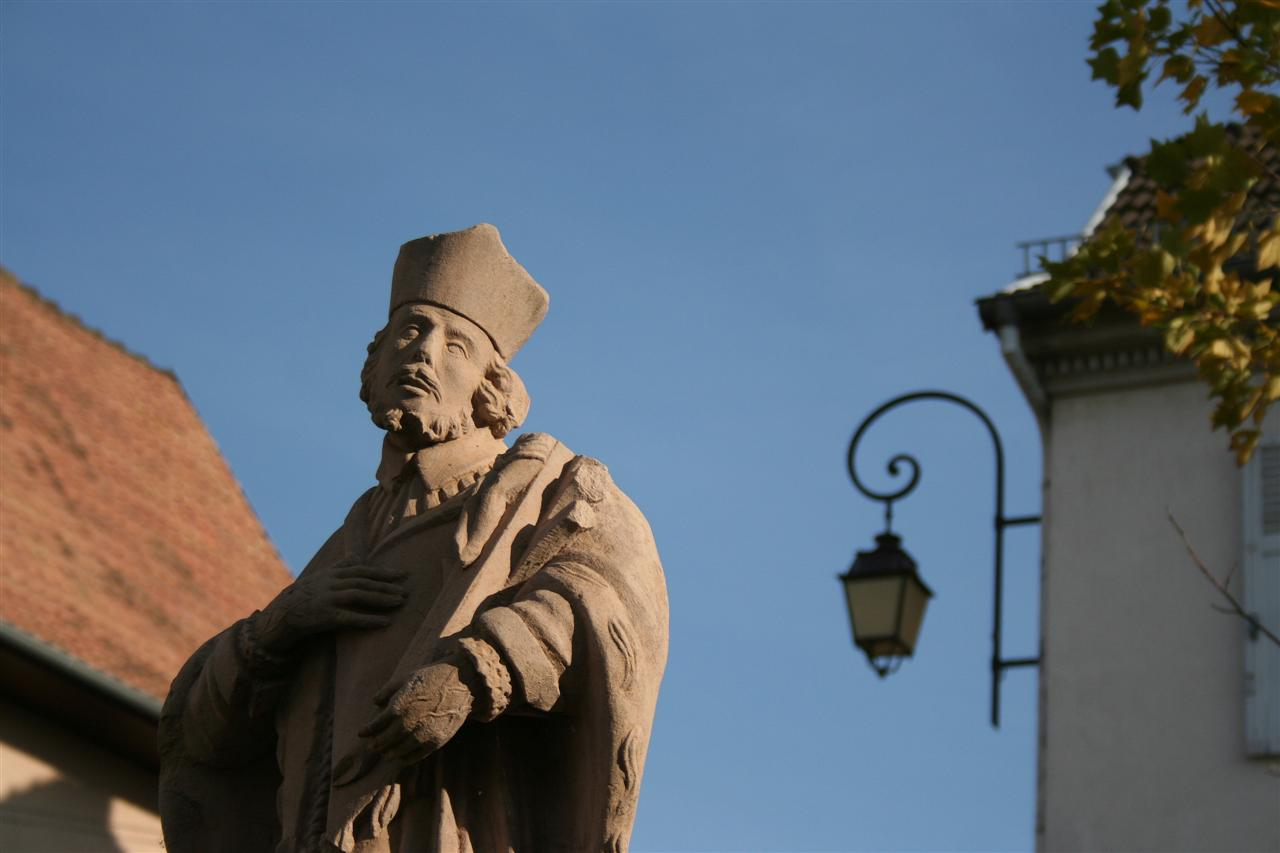
Fountain of John of Nepomuk

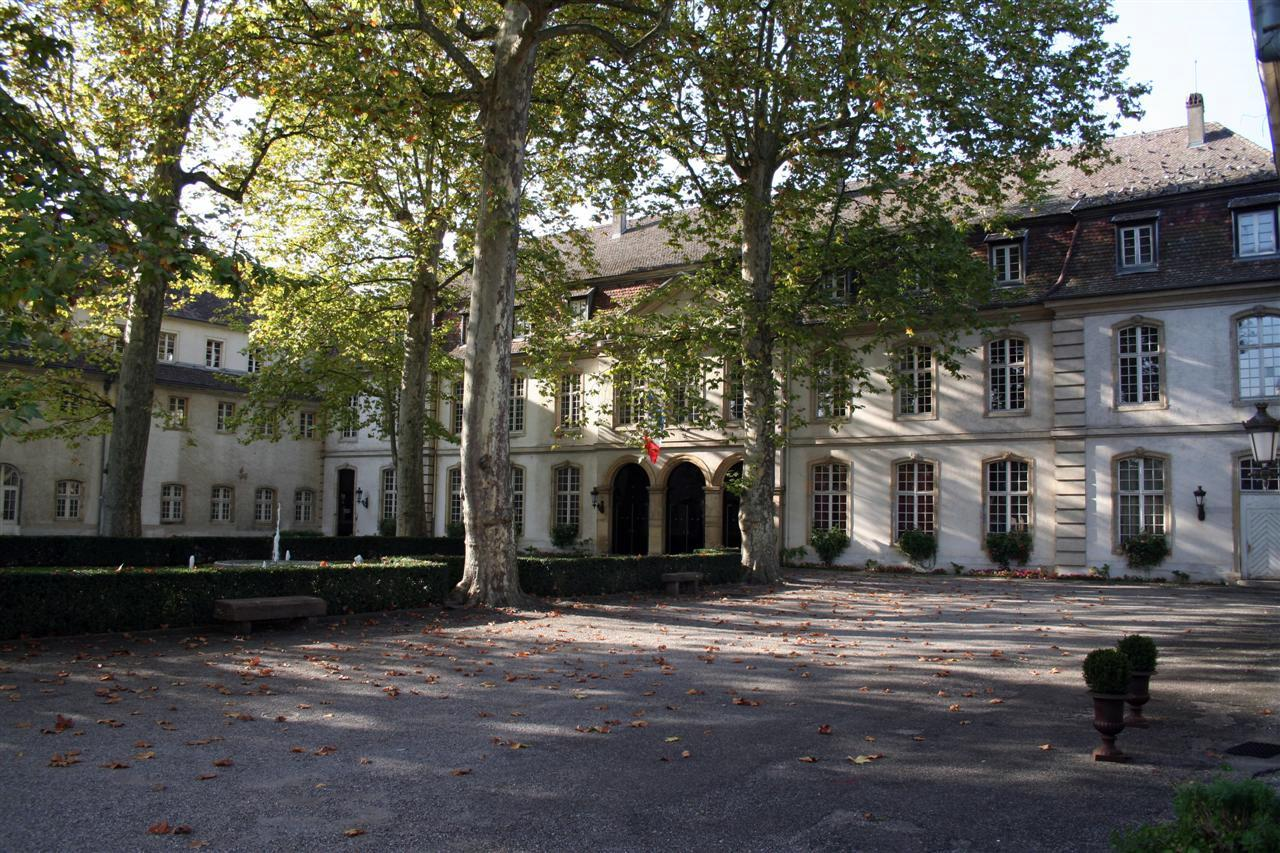
The former Commandery

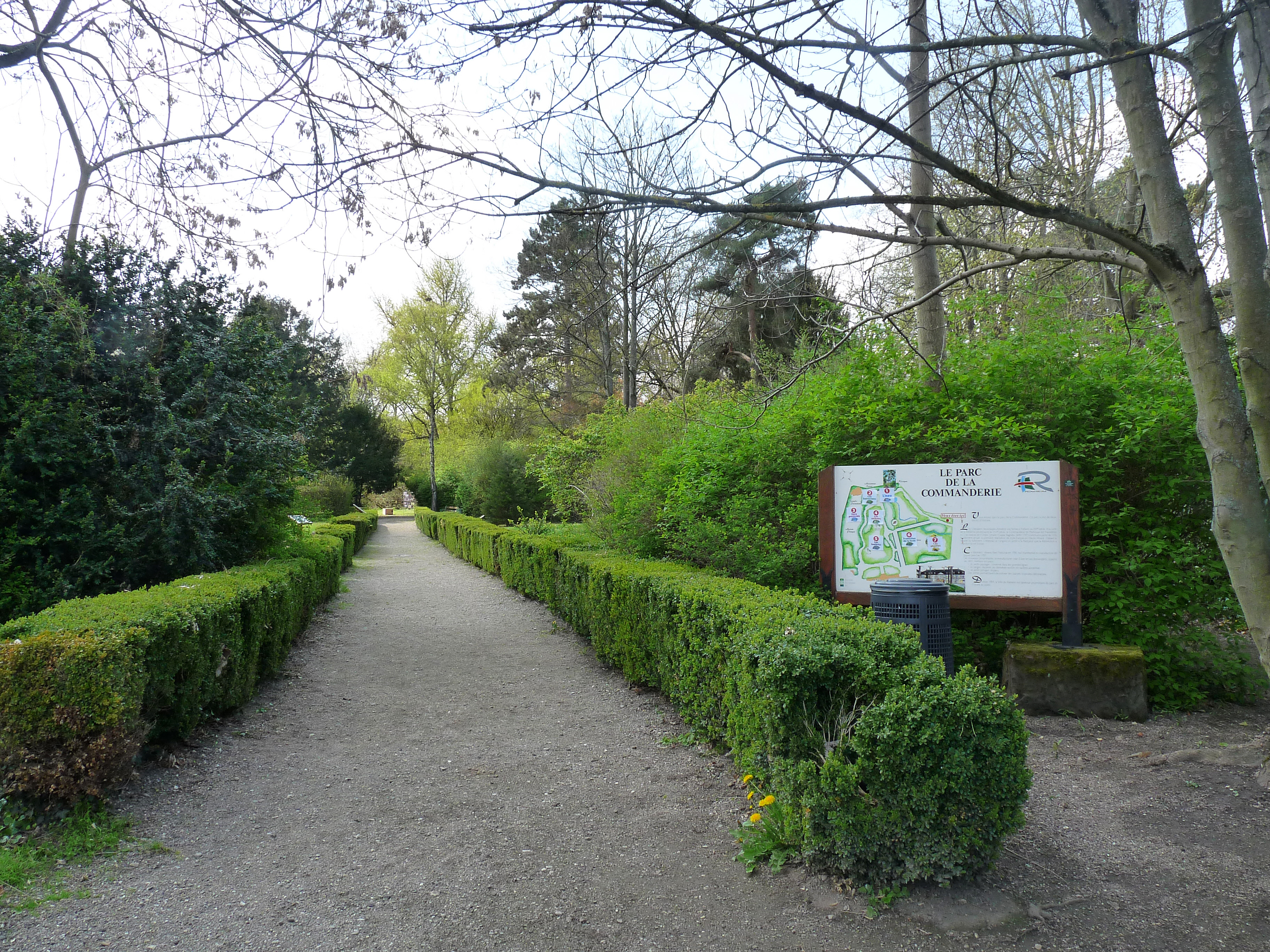
Entrance to the Park of the Commandery

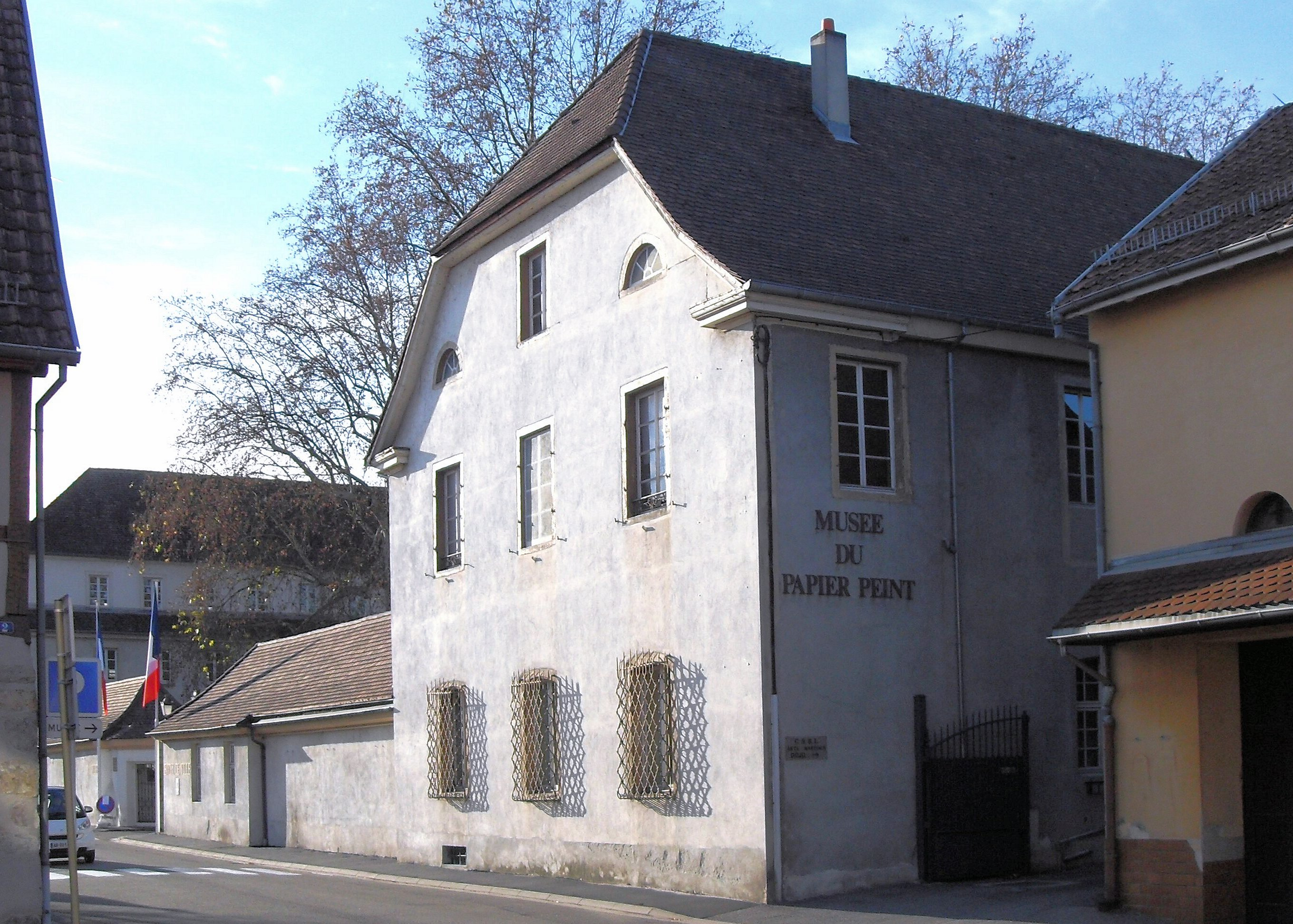
Museum of wallpaper

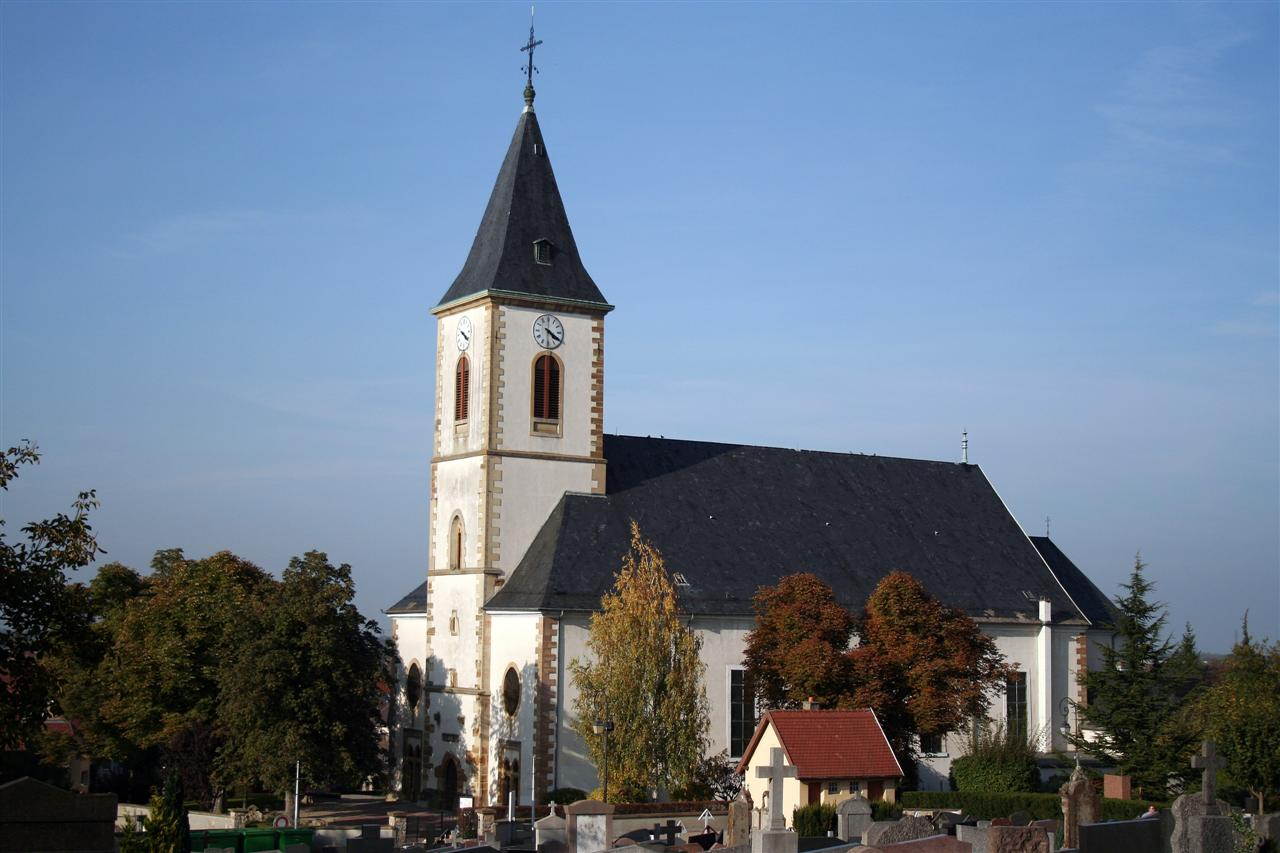
Saint-Léger church

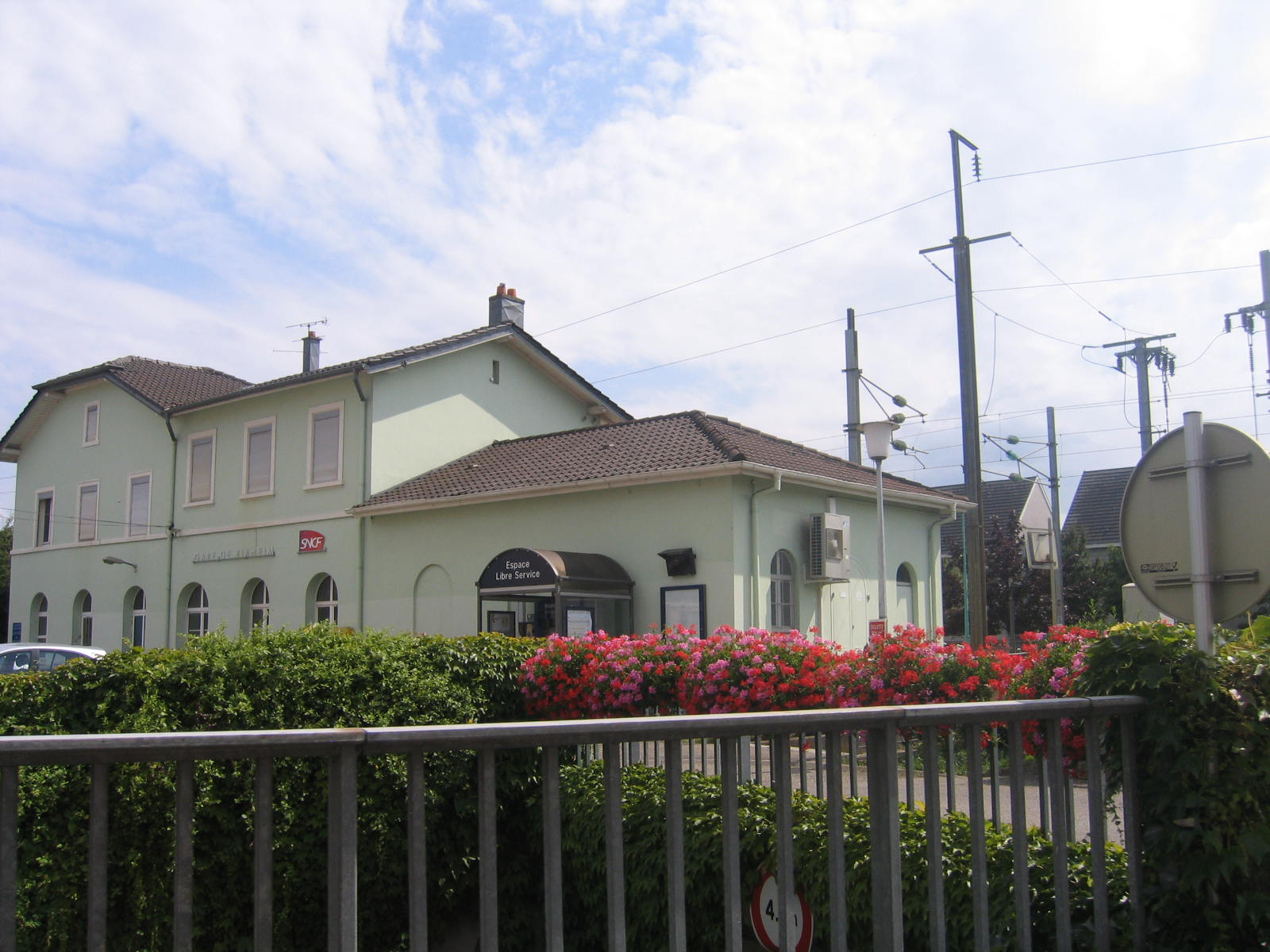
Rixheim Station

== See also ==
- Communes of the Haut-Rhin department
