= EV5 Via Romea Francigena =

European cycling route

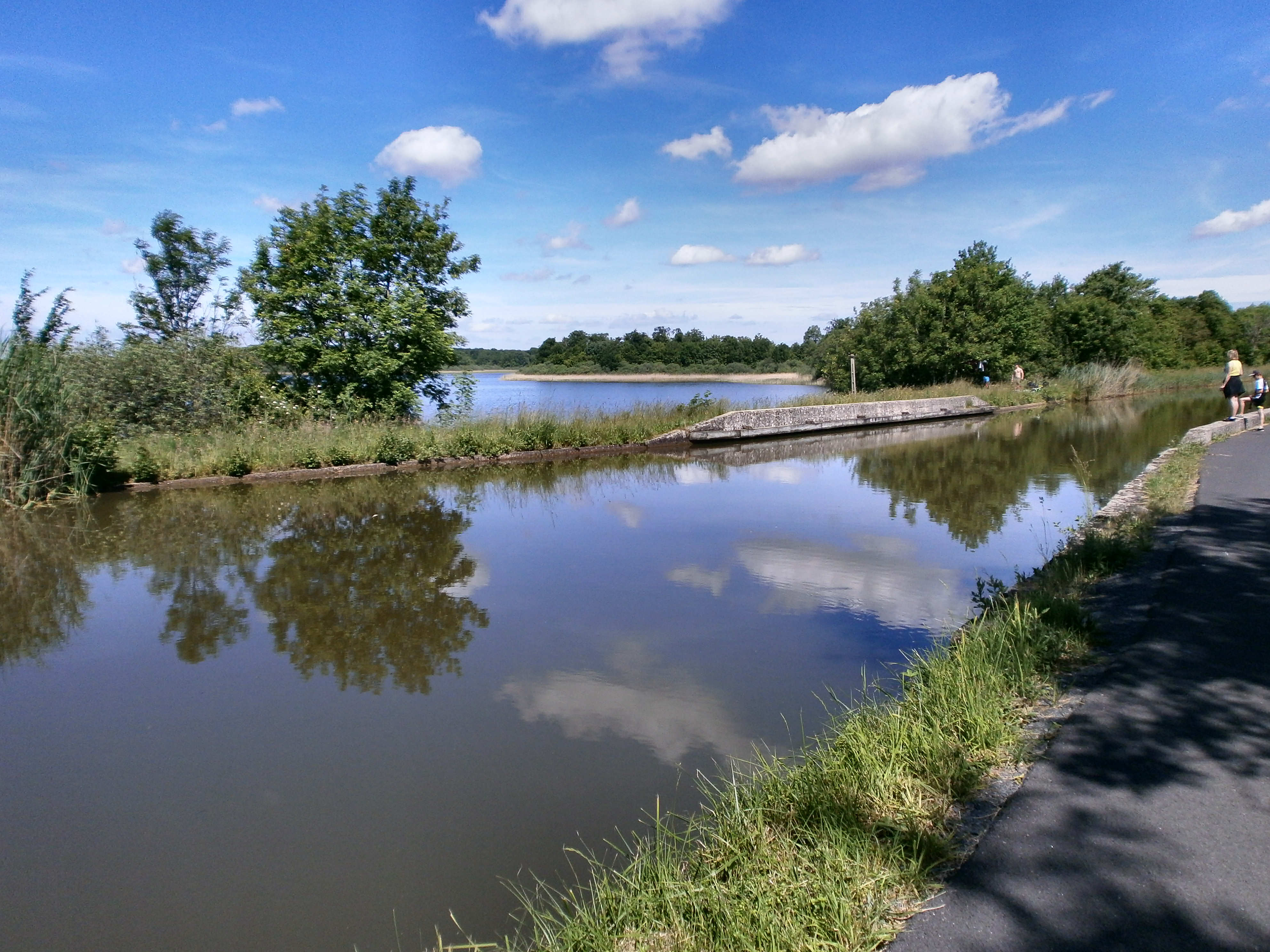
- Length: 3,900 km (2,400 mi)
- Designation: European Cyclists' Federation
- Trailheads: Canterbury, UK to Brindisi, Italy
- Use: cycling
- Website: http://www.eurovelo.com/en/eurovelos/eurovelo-5
Trail map

Map of the EuroVelo 5 route.

EuroVelo 5 (EV5), named the Via Romea Francigena, is a 3,900 km (2,400 mi) long EuroVelo long-distance cycling route running from Canterbury to Rome and ending at the Italian port of Brindisi. The route crosses Europe passing successively through six countries: UK, France, Belgium, Luxembourg, France again, Switzerland and Italy.

The EV5 is named the Via Romea Francigena after the ancient road from France to Rome that passed over the high Alps: this is reflected in the old road's Latin name, Via Romea Francigena, which means "the way to Rome that comes from France". This route was notably documented by Archbishop of Canterbury, Sigeric the Serious who made the trip to Rome and back again in the 10th century.

Note that there is also a walking trail called the Via Francigena which follows Sigeric's route from Canterbury to Rome more closely. It is important to realise that the EuroVelo route does not in any way follow the walking route; the two are very different. For instance, the Via Francigena walking trail does not pass through Belgium or Luxembourg.

== Route ==
=== In England ===
In England, the EV5 is complete. The route is 113 mi (182 km) long and follows the National Cycle Network route NCR1 from Canterbury to Dover.

From the ancient city of Canterbury which was the historic starting point of Sigeric's Via Francigena, the EV5 then travels to the coast and the port of Sandwich and ends at Dover, where a ferry can take you to France to continue the ride.

In England, the EV5 goes through Canterbury, Sandwich and Dover.

=== In France ===
As of January 2014, the EV5 in France is only complete in the eastern section.

There are two sections of EV5 in France. One is in the north: it begins as it arrives from England at Calais before leaving France after Lille to head over the Belgian border towards Brussels. The second section is in the east of the country when the EV5 re-enters France from Luxembourg at Sarreguemine (next to Strasbourg) and makes its way to Basel, Switzerland.

In the northern part of France, the EV5 goes through Calais (EV4), Béthune, Lille and Roubaix. It then crosses the border into Belgium (see below).

In the eastern part of France, the EV5 arrives from Luxembourg (see below) and passes through the provinces of Lorraine and Alsace. It follows a series of canals:

- the Canal des houillères de la Sarre 65 km (40 mi) from Sarreguemines to Gondrexange
- the Marne–Rhine Canal 75 km (47 mi) from Gondrexange to Strasbourg (EV15).
- the old Canal de la Bruche 30 km (19 mi) from Strasbourg to Soultz-les-Bains
- the Alsace Wine Route (Véloroute du vignoble d'Alsace) from Soultz-les-Bains to Cernay
- the route from the Ochsenfeld and Hardt 50 km (31 mi): Battenheim, Baldersheim, Mulhouse, Kembs and Saint-Louis

=== In Belgium ===
In July 2019, the EV5 in Belgium was completed in all sections, but lacked signposting through Brussels. In March of 2022, the Brussels section was signposted, rendering the route complete through all of Belgium, up to Luxembourg, As of May 2022.

In Belgium, the EV5 follows the Flanders Cycle Route LF6 from the French border until just south of Brussels. After a ride through flat countryside, the EV5 goes through the hills of Haspengouw, Hageland and the Flemish Ardennes. From Namur to Dinant, it passes through the Meuse Valley and its steep cliffs before stumbling on small villages, pretty rivers and various forests of the green Wallonia before crossing into Luxembourg.

In Belgium, the EV5 goes through Brussels, Namur (EV3) and Martelange.

=== In Luxembourg ===
As of January 2014, the EV5 in Luxembourg is still in development.

In the Grand Duchy of Luxembourg, the EV5 runs 107 km (66 mi) and follows a network of dedicated cycle paths from the Belgian border, through to its cliff-top capital city, and towards the French and German borders at Schengen. The EV5 follows the following national routes in Luxembourg: PC18, PC17, PC12, PC13, the Luxembourg-Ville route no. 10, PC1, PC11, PC7 and PC3.

In Luxembourg, the EV5 goes through Strassen, Luxembourg, Hesperange and Schengen. It then passes through back to France (see above).

=== In Switzerland ===
In Switzerland, the EV5 is complete. It follows Swiss National Bike Route no. 3.

From France, the EV5 goes through Basel (EV6, EV15), Jura Mountains, Aarau, Lucerne, Lake Lucerne, Andermatt (EV15), the Gotthard pass, Bellinzona, the Monte Ceneri Pass, Lake Lugano, Mendrisio and Chiasso.

=== In Italy ===
As of January 2014, the EV5 in Italy is largely incomplete.

In Italy, the EV5 follows the BicItalia BI 3 Ciclovia dei Pellegrini cycle route passing through Rome and following a mainly inland route towards the west of the country before heading east to Brindisi. The route in Italy follows more closely the traditional route of the Via Francigena, a route which has recently been awarded EU funds to reinstate hostelry organisation and for route improvement.

In Italy, the EV5 goes through Milan, Pavia, Fidenza, Piacenza (EV8) Parma, Berceto, Aulla, Florence (EV7), Siena, Bolsena, Rome (EV7), Fiuggi, Cassino, Benevento, Ariano Irpino, Candela, Gravina in Puglia, Taranto and Brindisi.

== Gallery ==
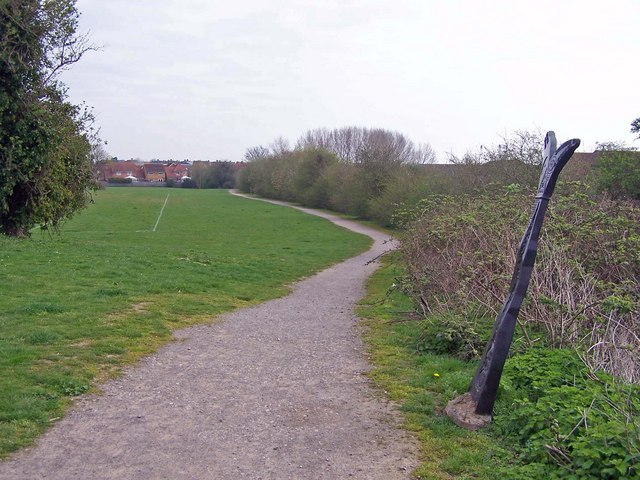
The EV5 in Kemsley, Kent.

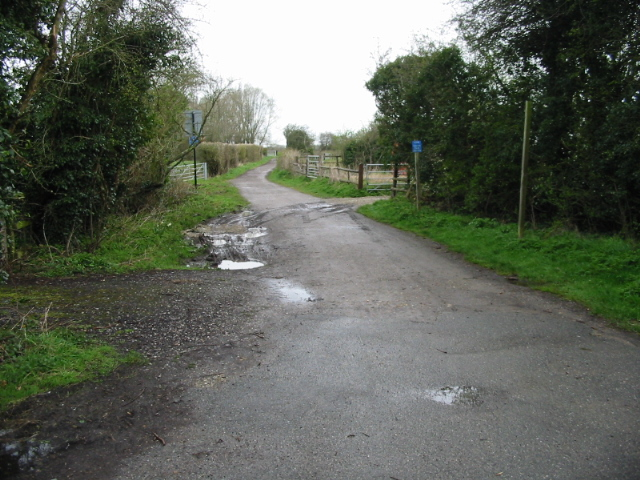
The EV5 between Whitstable and Canterbury, Kent.

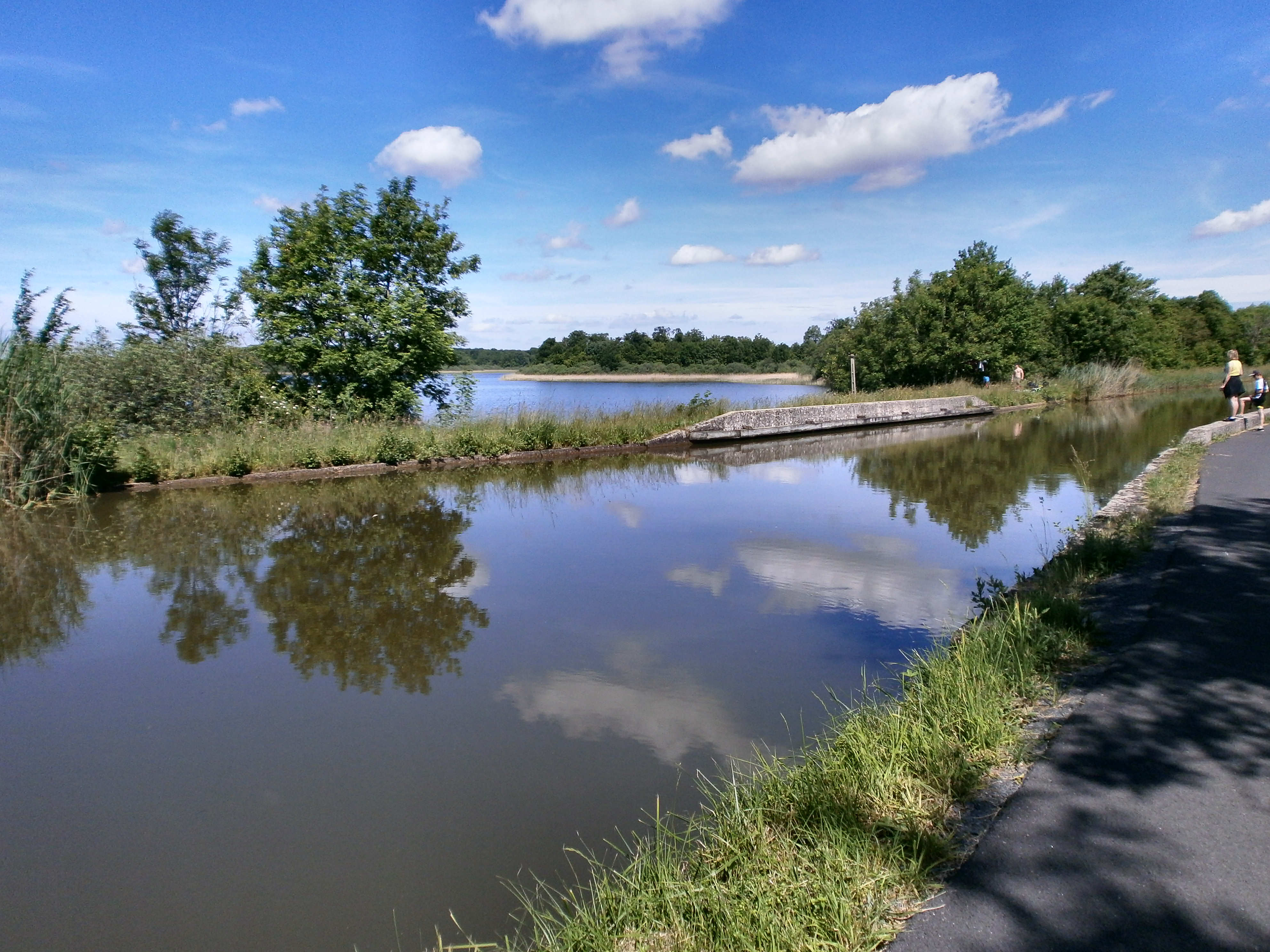
The EV5 along the Saar Canal, Lorraine, France.

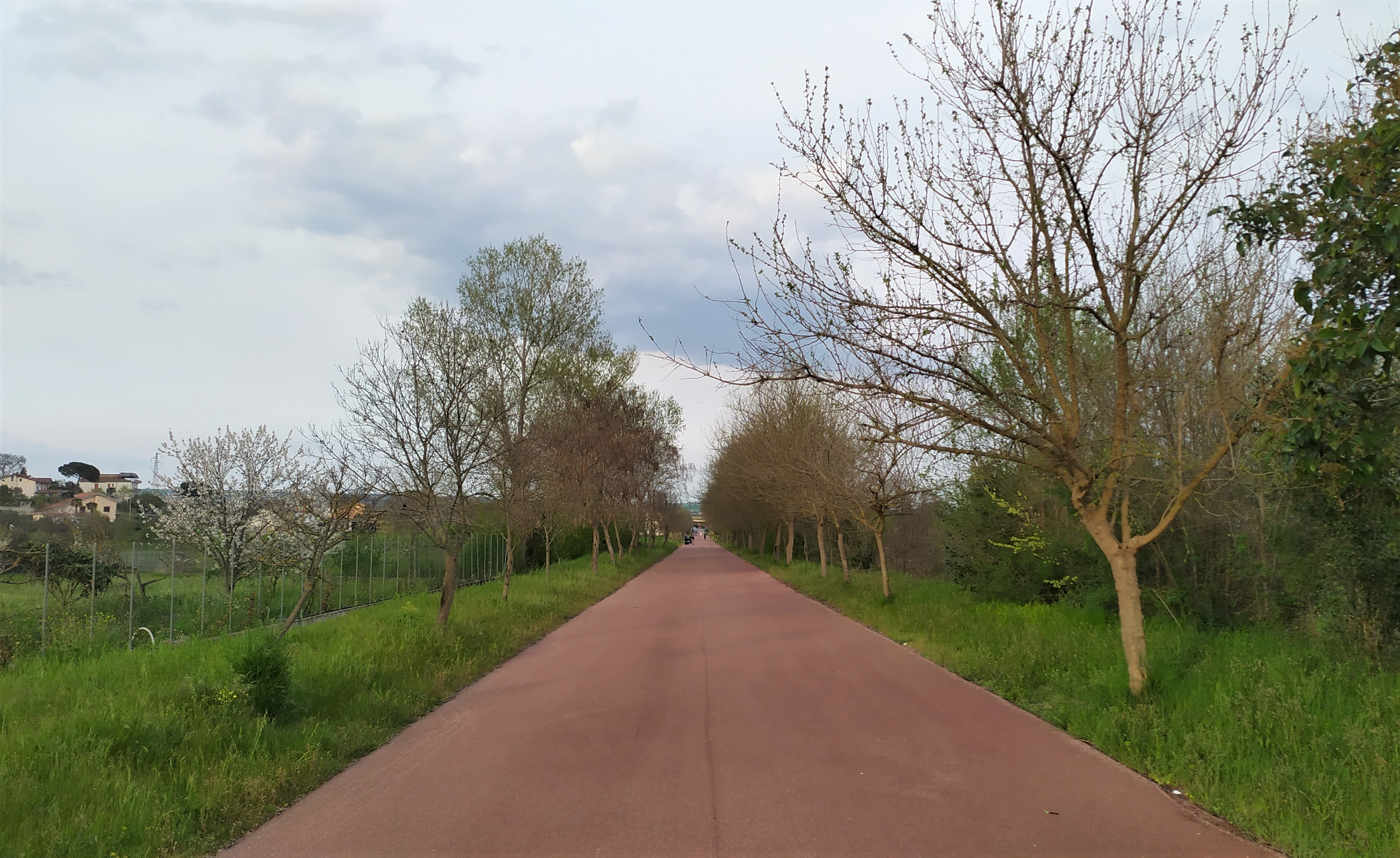
The EV5 in Benevento, Italy.

== See also ==
- EuroVelo
- Via Francigena
