= Château de Butenheim =

13th-century castle ruin in Alsace, France

Coordinates: 47.7460°N 7.5150°E

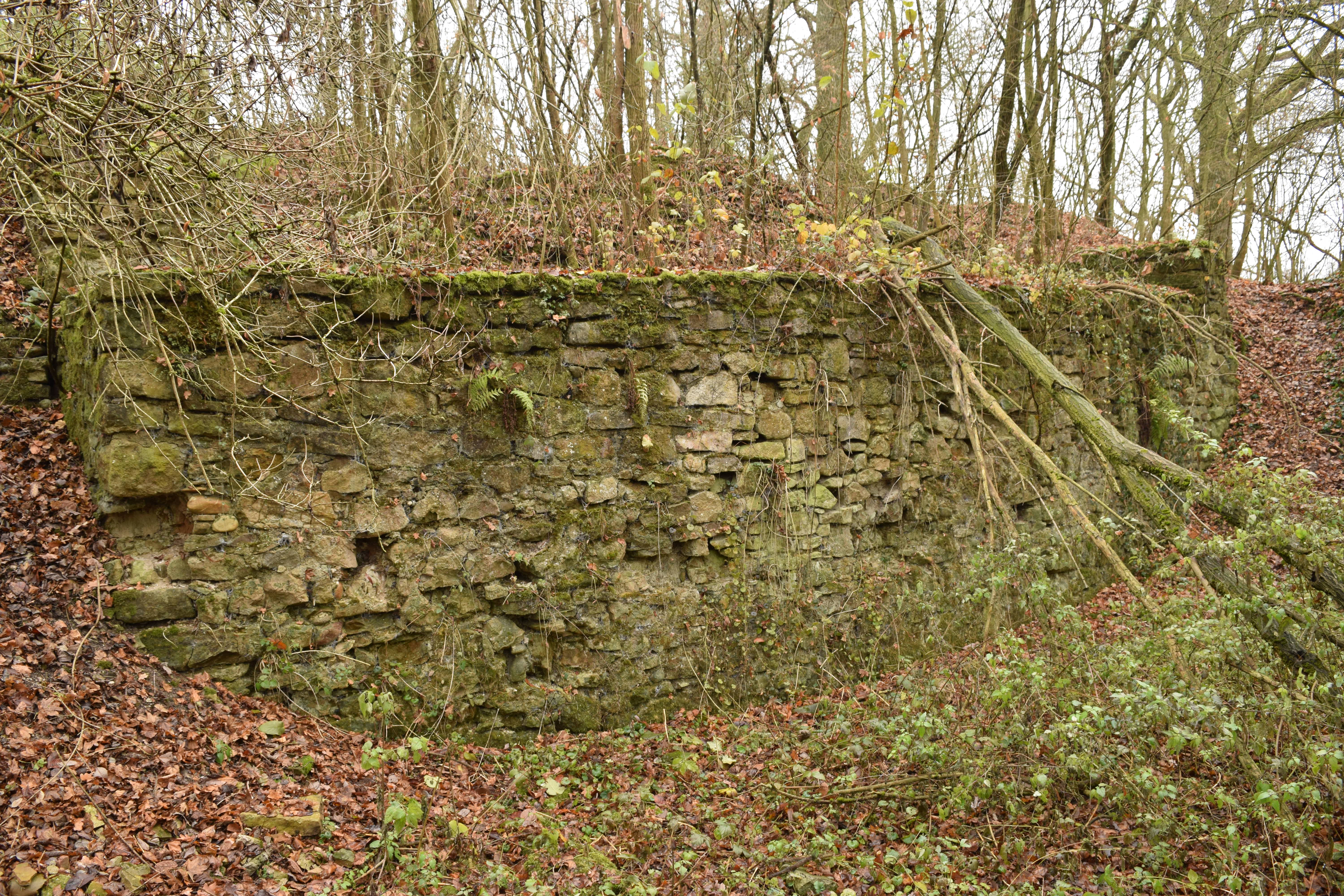
Ruins of Château de Butenheim

Château de Butenheim is a 13th-century castle ruin in the commune of Petit-Landau, in the department of Haut-Rhin, Alsace, France. It is a listed historical monument since 1932.
