= Bantzenheim =

Commune in Grand Est, France

- Commune
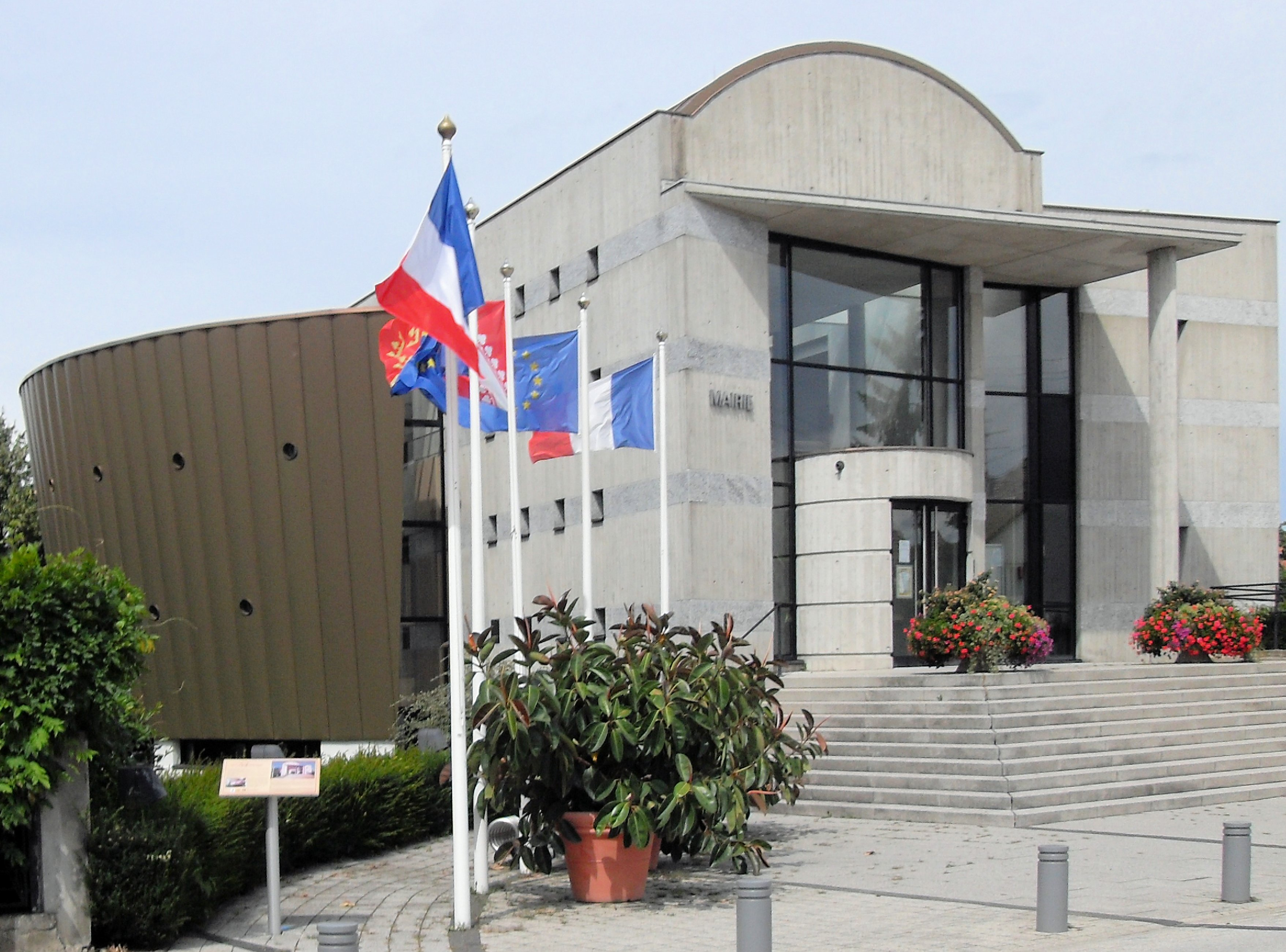
- The town hall in Bantzenheim

- Coat of arms
- Location of Bantzenheim
- Location within France Location within Grand Est
- Coordinates: 47°49′32″N 7°30′59″E
- Country: France
- Region: Grand Est
- Department: Haut-Rhin
- Arrondissement: Mulhouse
- Canton: Rixheim
- Intercommunality: CA Mulhouse Alsace Agglomération

Government
  - Mayor (2020–2026): Roland Onimus
- Area^{1}: 21.22 km^{2} (8.19 sq mi)
- Elevation: 220 m (720 ft)
- Highest elevation: 229 m (751 ft)
- Lowest elevation: 213 m (699 ft)
- Population (2023): 1,630
  - Density: 76.8/km^{2} (199/sq mi)
- Time zone: UTC+01:00 (CET)
  - Summer (DST): UTC+02:00 (CEST)
- INSEE/Postal code: 68020 /68490
- ^{1} French Land Register data, which excludes lakes, ponds, glaciers > 1 km^{2} (0.386 sq mi or 247 acres) and river estuaries.

Bantzenheim (French pronunciation: [bantsənaim]; German: Banzenheim) is a commune in the Haut-Rhin department in Alsace in north-eastern France.

== See also ==
- Communes of the Haut-Rhin department
