= Flaxlanden =

Commune in Grand Est, France

- Commune
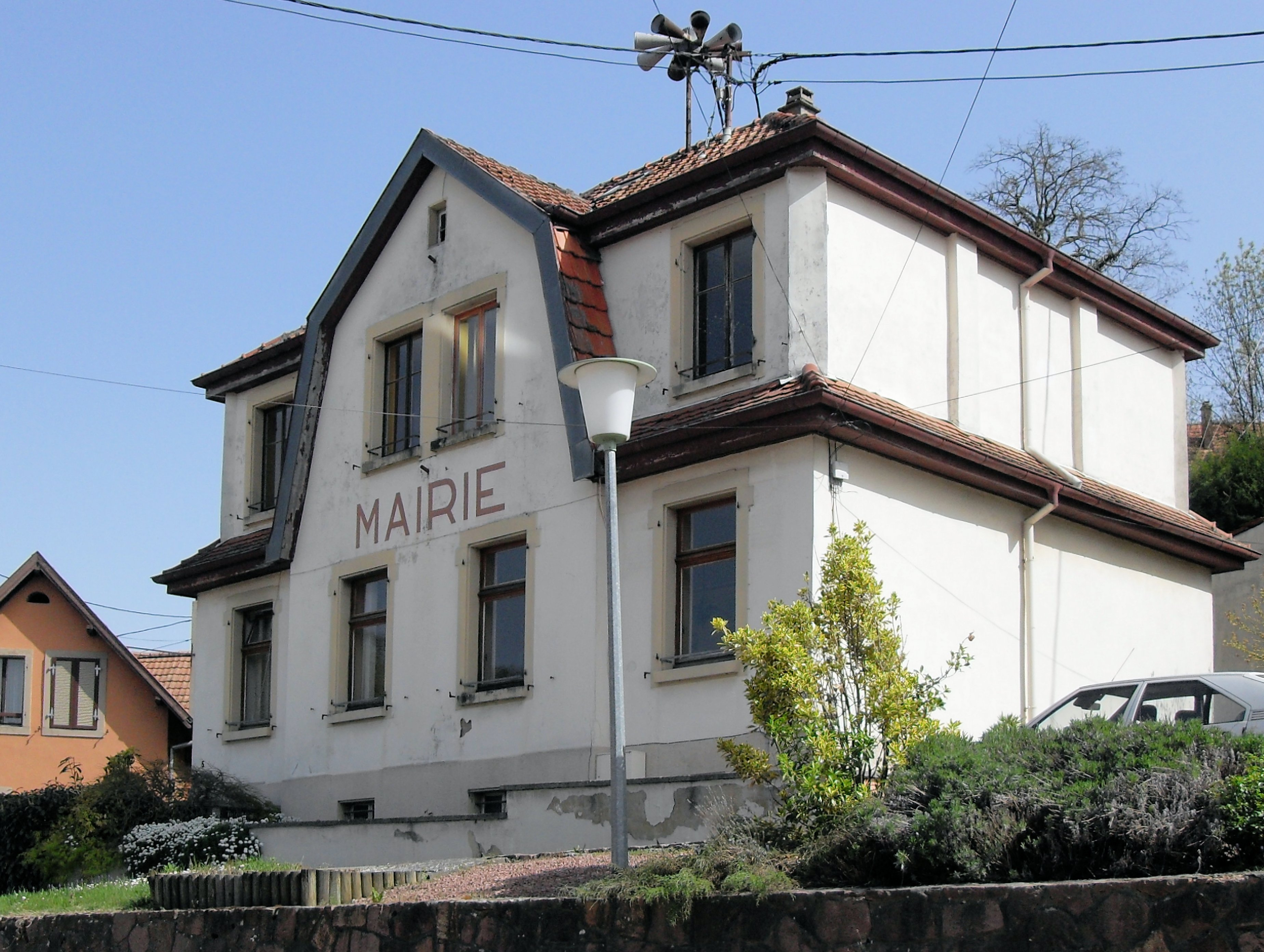
- The town hall in Flaxlanden

- Coat of arms
- Location of Flaxlanden
- Location within France Location within Grand Est
- Coordinates: 47°41′48″N 7°18′58″E
- Country: France
- Region: Grand Est
- Department: Haut-Rhin
- Arrondissement: Mulhouse
- Canton: Brunstatt-Didenheim
- Intercommunality: Mulhouse Alsace Agglomération

Government
  - Mayor (2020–2026): Francine Agudo-Perez
- Area^{1}: 4.33 km^{2} (1.67 sq mi)
- Elevation: 270 m (890 ft)
- Highest elevation: 403 m (1,322 ft)
- Lowest elevation: 257 m (843 ft)
- Population (2023): 1,370
  - Density: 316/km^{2} (819/sq mi)
- Time zone: UTC+01:00 (CET)
  - Summer (DST): UTC+02:00 (CEST)
- INSEE/Postal code: 68093 /68720
- ^{1} French Land Register data, which excludes lakes, ponds, glaciers > 1 km^{2} (0.386 sq mi or 247 acres) and river estuaries.

Flaxlanden is a commune in the Haut-Rhin department in Alsace in north-eastern France. It forms part of the Mulhouse Alsace Agglomération, the inter-communal local government body for the Mulhouse conurbation.

== Population ==
Historical population
Year	Pop.	±% p.a.
1968	804	—
1975	1,084	+4.36%
1982	1,144	+0.77%
1990	1,101	−0.48%
1999	1,254	+1.46%
2007	1,465	+1.96%
2012	1,460	−0.07%
2017	1,448	−0.16%
2023	1,370	−0.92%
Source: INSEE

== See also ==
- Communes of the Haut-Rhin département
