= Mulhouse Alsace Agglomération =

Communauté d'agglomération in Haut-Rhin

Coordinates: 47.75°N 7.34°E

- Communauté d'agglomération
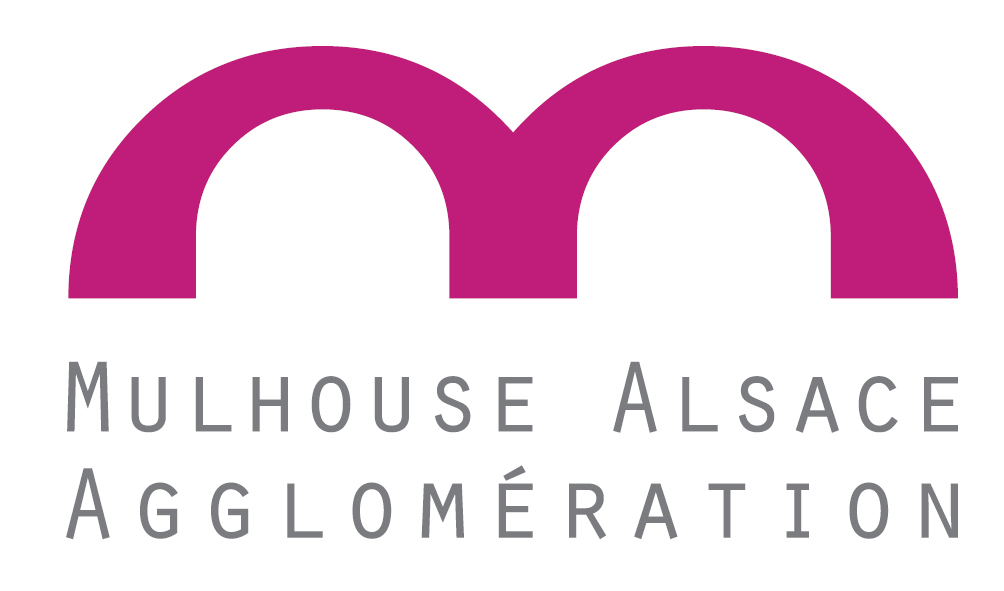

- Location within the Haut-Rhin department
- Country: France
- Region: Grand Est
- Department: Haut-Rhin
- No. of communes: {{{nbcomm}}}

Government
  - President: Fabian Jordan
- Area: 439.2 km^{2} (169.6 sq mi)
- Population (2018): 274,066
  - Density: 624.0/km^{2} (1,616/sq mi)
- Website: www.mulhouse-alsace.fr

The Mulhouse Alsace Agglomération is the Communauté d'agglomération, a type of local government structure, covering the metropolitan area of the city of Mulhouse in the department of Haut-Rhin and the region of Grand Est, northeastern France. Its area is 439.2 km^{2}. Its population was 274,066 in 2018, of which 108,942 in Mulhouse proper. The current president of the agglomeration community is Fabian Jordan, elected January 2017.

== Composition ==
The Mulhouse Alsace Agglomération covers 39 communes:

1. Baldersheim
2. Bantzenheim
3. Battenheim
4. Berrwiller
5. Bollwiller
6. Bruebach
7. Brunstatt-Didenheim
8. Chalampé
9. Dietwiller
10. Eschentzwiller
11. Feldkirch
12. Flaxlanden
13. Galfingue
14. Habsheim
15. Heimsbrunn
16. Hombourg
17. Illzach
18. Kingersheim
19. Lutterbach
20. Morschwiller-le-Bas
21. Mulhouse
22. Niffer
23. Ottmarsheim
24. Petit-Landau
25. Pfastatt
26. Pulversheim
27. Reiningue
28. Richwiller
29. Riedisheim
30. Rixheim
31. Ruelisheim
32. Sausheim
33. Staffelfelden
34. Steinbrunn-le-Bas
35. Ungersheim
36. Wittelsheim
37. Wittenheim
38. Zillisheim
39. Zimmersheim

== Responsibilities ==
On behalf of its 39 communes, the agglomeration exercises responsibility for:

- Spatial planning
- District heating
- Social cohesion
- Culture and tourism
- Sustainable Development
- Economic Development
- Higher education
- Employment
- Sports facilities
- Housing
- Senior citizen's services
- Children's services
- Public safety and citizenship
- Street cleaning, garbage collection and waste disposal
- Transportation and travel

Some of these responsibilities are subcontracted to the private sector. For example, the provision of the agglomeration's bus and tram network is subcontracted to Soléa.
