= Eschentzwiller =

Commune in Grand Est, France

- Commune
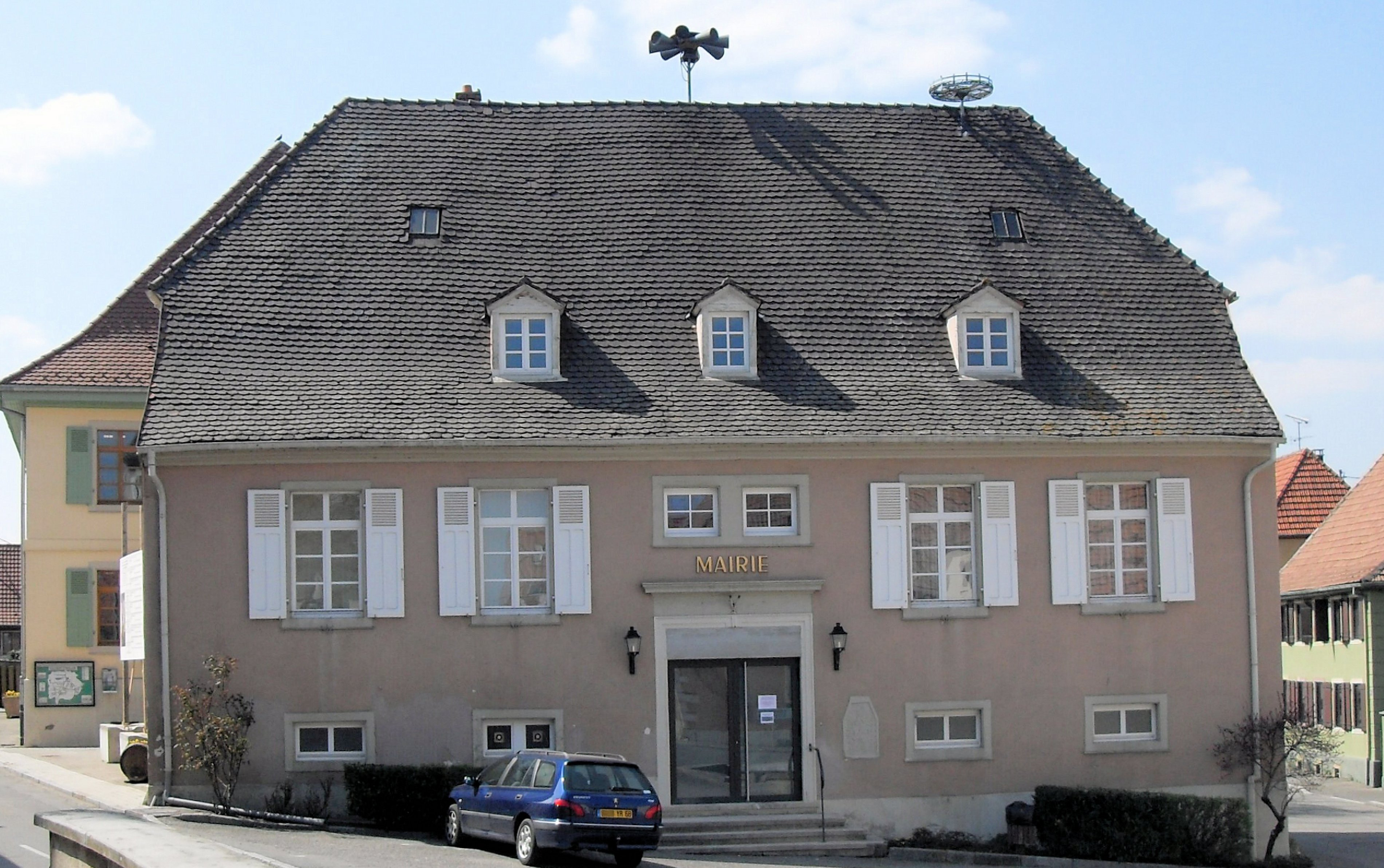
- The town hall in Eschentzwiller

- Coat of arms
- Location of Eschentzwiller
- Location within France Location within Grand Est
- Coordinates: 47°42′49″N 7°23′57″E
- Country: France
- Region: Grand Est
- Department: Haut-Rhin
- Arrondissement: Mulhouse
- Canton: Brunstatt-Didenheim
- Intercommunality: Mulhouse Alsace Agglomération

Government
  - Mayor (2020–2026): Gilbert Iffrig
- Area^{1}: 3.19 km^{2} (1.23 sq mi)
- Elevation: 260 m (850 ft)
- Highest elevation: 347 m (1,138 ft)
- Lowest elevation: 242 m (794 ft)
- Population (2023): 1,527
  - Density: 479/km^{2} (1,240/sq mi)
- Time zone: UTC+01:00 (CET)
  - Summer (DST): UTC+02:00 (CEST)
- INSEE/Postal code: 68084 /68440
- ^{1} French Land Register data, which excludes lakes, ponds, glaciers > 1 km^{2} (0.386 sq mi or 247 acres) and river estuaries.

Eschentzwiller (French pronunciation: [ɛʃəntsvilɛʁ]; German: Eschenzweiler; Alsatian: Aschedswiller) is a commune in the Haut-Rhin department in Alsace in north-eastern France. It forms part of the Mulhouse Alsace Agglomération, the inter-communal local government body for the Mulhouse conurbation.

== See also ==
- Communes of the Haut-Rhin département
