= Chalampé =

Commune in Grand Est, France

Chalampé Chalampé / Eichwald (arch.)
- Commune
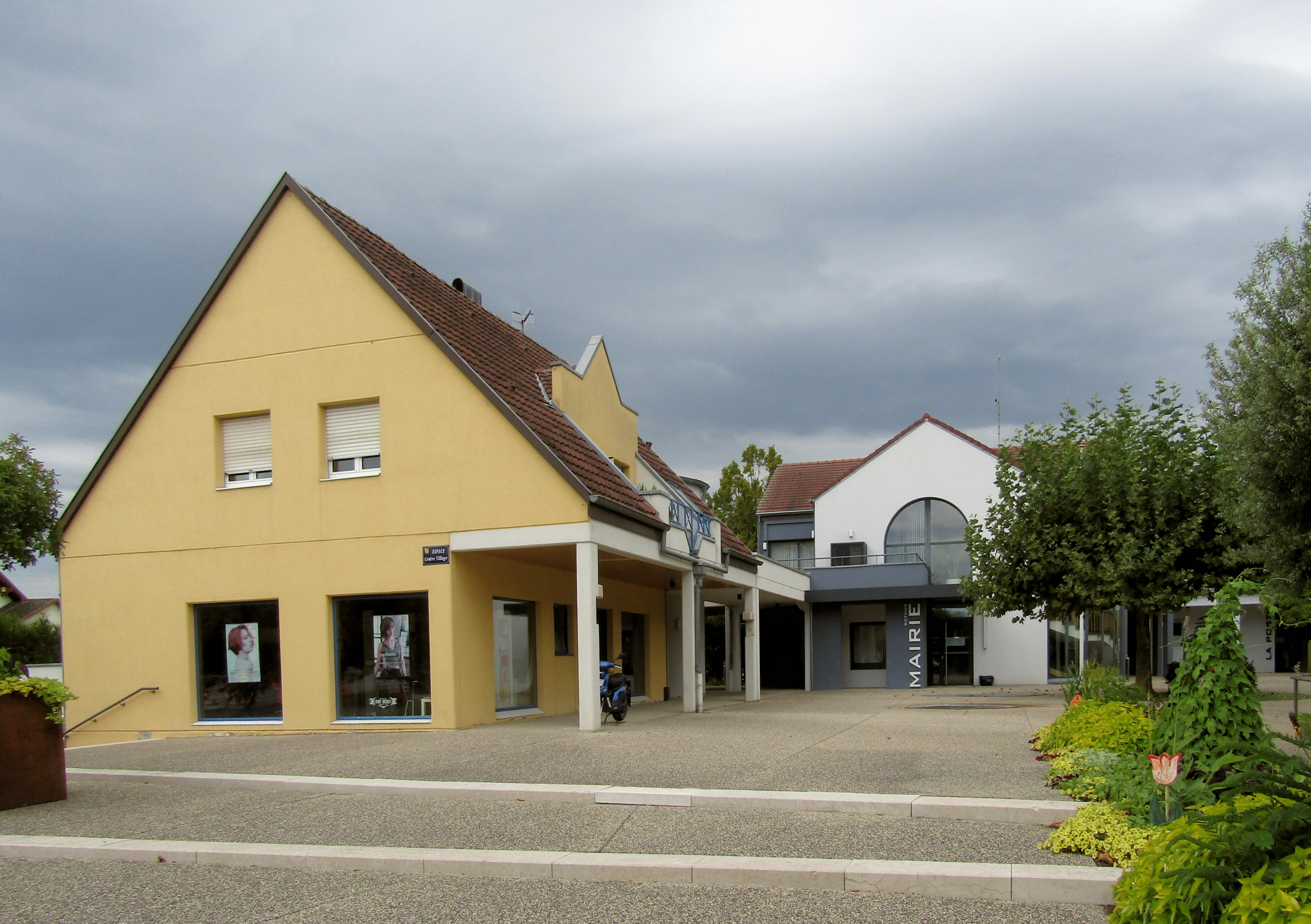
- The town hall in Chalampé

- Coat of arms
- Location of Chalampé
- Location within France Location within Grand Est
- Coordinates: 47°49′N 7°32′E
- Country: France
- Region: Grand Est
- Department: Haut-Rhin
- Arrondissement: Mulhouse
- Canton: Rixheim
- Intercommunality: CA Mulhouse Alsace Agglomération

Government
  - Mayor (2022–2026): Hugues Hartmann
- Area^{1}: 4.77 km^{2} (1.84 sq mi)
- Elevation: 215 m (705 ft)
- Highest elevation: 217 m (712 ft)
- Lowest elevation: 211 m (692 ft)
- Population (2023): 996
  - Density: 209/km^{2} (541/sq mi)
- Time zone: UTC+01:00 (CET)
  - Summer (DST): UTC+02:00 (CEST)
- INSEE/Postal code: 68064 /68490
- Dialling codes: 0389
- ^{1} French Land Register data, which excludes lakes, ponds, glaciers > 1 km^{2} (0.386 sq mi or 247 acres) and river estuaries.

Chalampé (French pronunciation: [ʃalɑ̃pe]; German: Eichwald) is a commune in the Haut-Rhin department in Alsace in north-eastern France, just across the river Rhine from Neuenburg, Germany.

The town was founded by soldiers of Marshal Dubourg who in 1709 had beaten the Austrians under Count Claude Florimond de Mercy in the War of the Spanish Succession. It is located in an area called Eichwald (oak forest) by the otherwise German-speaking population of the Alsace and bears its French name since 1735. Before Johann Gottfried Tulla and others straightened the Rhine in the 19th century, the river had changed its course several times, moving the border. Thus, the village was sometimes considered to be part of Germany.

== Population ==
Historical population
| Year | Pop. | ±% p.a. |
|---|---|---|
| 1968 | 614 | — |
| 1975 | 891 | +5.46% |
| 1982 | 1,034 | +2.15% |
| 1990 | 1,011 | −0.28% |
| 1999 | 966 | −0.50% |
| 2007 | 878 | −1.19% |
| 2012 | 969 | +1.99% |
| 2017 | 950 | −0.40% |
| 2023 | 996 | +0.79% |
Source: INSEE

== See also ==
- Communes of the Haut-Rhin department
