= Thalbahn Habsheim =

Narrow-gauge railway in Germany

Coordinates: 47.7279°N 7.4253°E

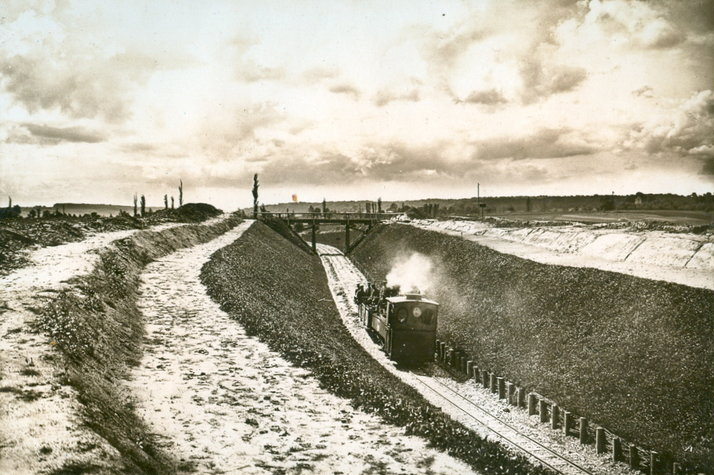
- Cutting of the Thalbahn at km 12.2

Technical
- Line length: 25.7 km (16.0 mi)
- Track gauge: 600 mm (1 ft 11 5/8 in)
Route map
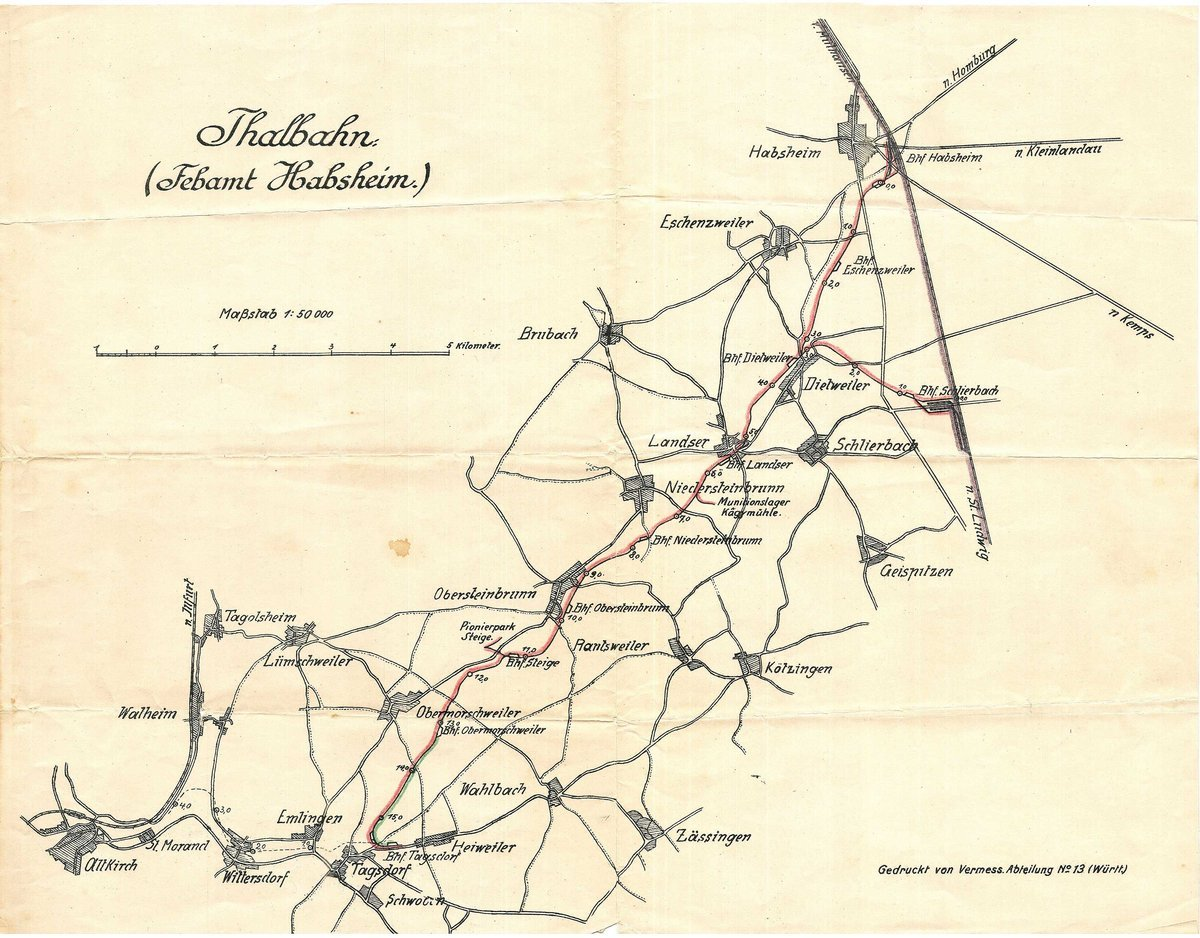
Thalbahn (Light Railway Office Habsheim),
Survey Department №13 (Württemberg)

The Thalbahn Habsheim (German for Habsheim Valley Railway) was a 24.6 km (15.3 mi) long narrow-gauge railway with a gauge of 600 mm (1 ft 11 5/8 in) at Habsheim in Alsace.

== History ==
The Thalbahn was built during the First World War by German soldiers and Romanian prisoners of war as a military light railway with a gauge of 600 mm. For the construction of the route, steel rails were permanently laid onto wooden sleepers.

== Route ==
The route ran initially from Habsheim railway station to the southwest to Tagsdorf. On the way, there was a 3 kilometres (1.9 mi) long branch line to Schlierbach and secondary spurs to the ammunition depot Kägymühle and the Pioneer Park Steige. The main route was later extended by 4 kilometres (2.5 mi) to Altkirch and by 2 kilometres (1.2 mi) to Wahlbach.

== Buildings ==
The railway staff's offices were located in Landser's town hall and on the first floor of the Le Bœuf Rouge restaurant.

The camp of the Romanian prisoners of war was located within a military camp at the eastern exit of Dietweiler. Many prisoners of war died due to malnutrition, forced labor and poor living conditions and were buried in the Romanian cemetery in Dietweiler.

== Locomotives ==
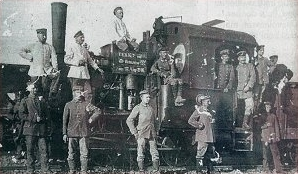
One of the Thalbahn locomotives in Landser

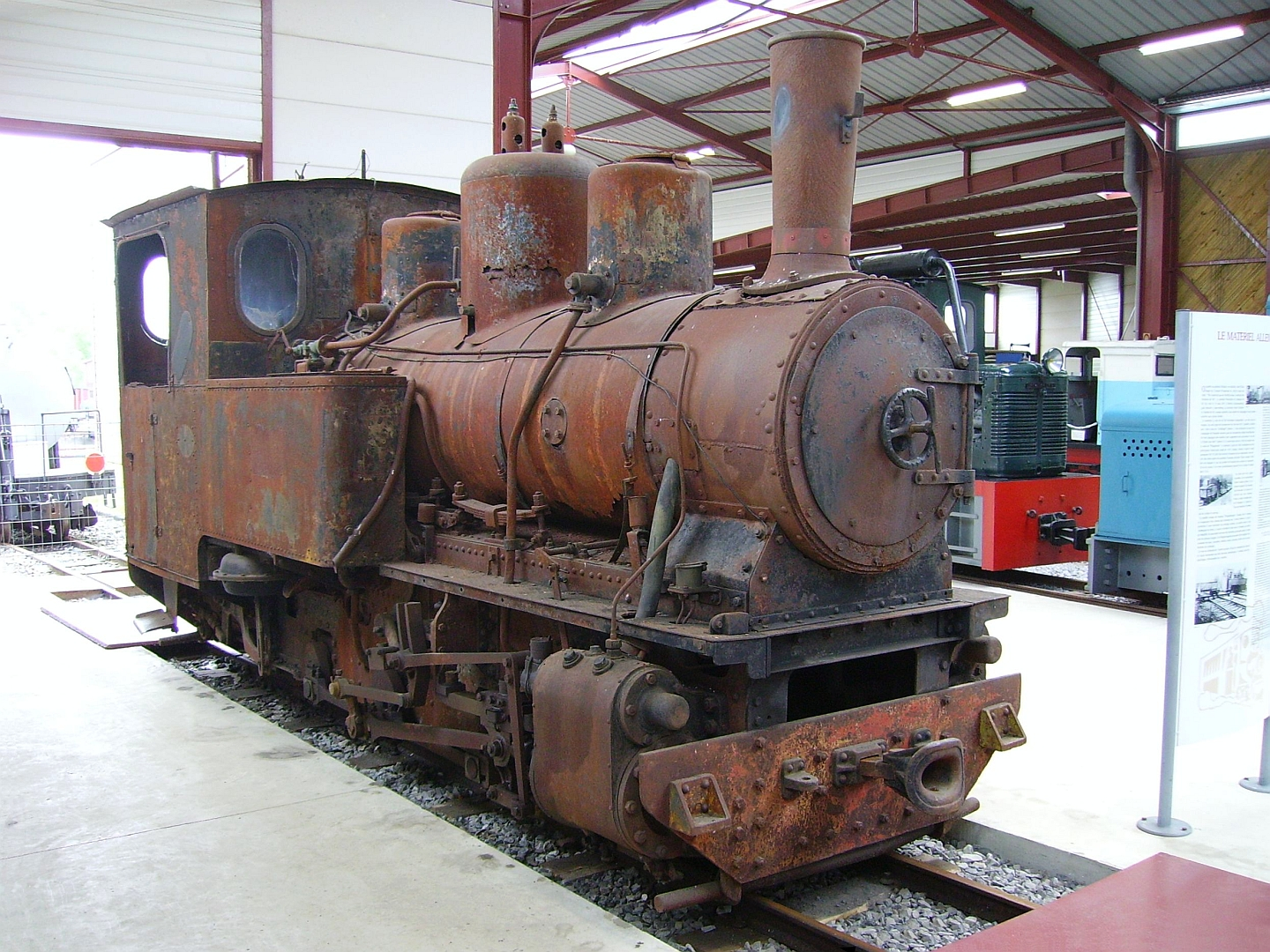
O&K 0-10-0 steam locomotive No. 8285/1917

One of the locomotives was the O&K ten-wheeler No. 8285/1917 (0-10-0). It was delivered on 13 June 1917 from Berlin and is now preserved on the Chemin de fer Froissy-Dompierre.
