= Canton of Rixheim =

Coordinates: 47.75°N 7.40°E

The canton of Rixheim is an administrative division of the Haut-Rhin department, northeastern France. It was created at the French canton reorganisation which came into effect in March 2015. Its seat is in Rixheim.

It consists of the following communes:

1. Baldersheim
2. Bantzenheim
3. Battenheim
4. Chalampé
5. Habsheim
6. Hombourg
7. Niffer
8. Ottmarsheim
9. Petit-Landau
10. Riedisheim
11. Rixheim
12. Sausheim
