= Bruebach =

Commune in Grand Est, France

- Commune
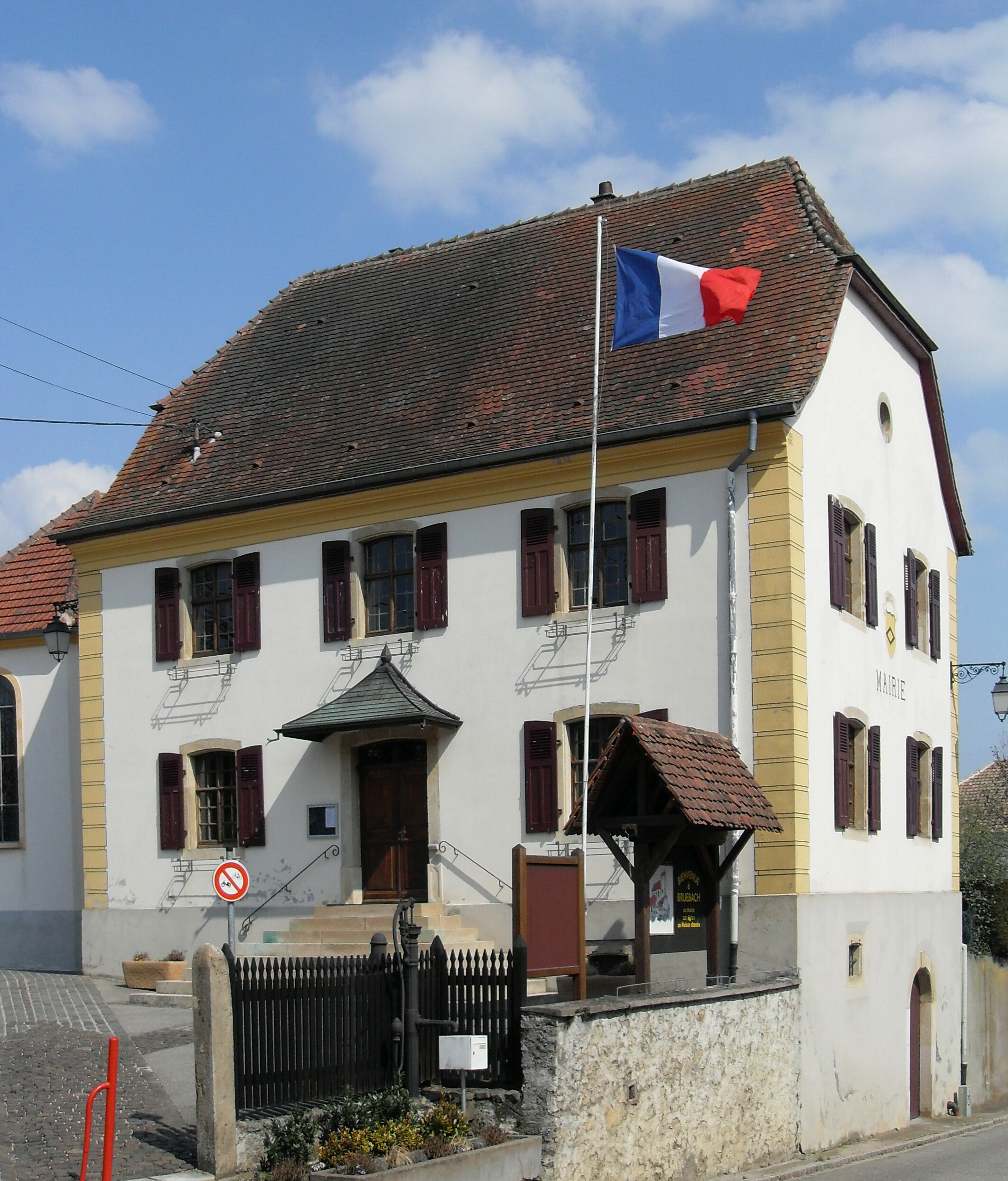
- The town hall in Bruebach

- Coat of arms
- Location of Bruebach
- Location within France Location within Grand Est
- Coordinates: 47°42′02″N 7°21′38″E
- Country: France
- Region: Grand Est
- Department: Haut-Rhin
- Arrondissement: Mulhouse
- Canton: Brunstatt-Didenheim
- Intercommunality: Mulhouse Alsace Agglomération

Government
  - Mayor (2020–2026): Gilles Schillinger
- Area^{1}: 7.01 km^{2} (2.71 sq mi)
- Elevation: 320 m (1,050 ft)
- Highest elevation: 383 m (1,257 ft)
- Lowest elevation: 276 m (906 ft)
- Population (2023): 1,042
  - Density: 149/km^{2} (385/sq mi)
- Time zone: UTC+01:00 (CET)
  - Summer (DST): UTC+02:00 (CEST)
- INSEE/Postal code: 68055 /68440
- ^{1} French Land Register data, which excludes lakes, ponds, glaciers > 1 km^{2} (0.386 sq mi or 247 acres) and river estuaries.

Bruebach (French pronunciation: [bʁybak]; German: Brubach) is a commune in the Haut-Rhin department in Alsace in north-eastern France. It forms part of the Mulhouse Alsace Agglomération, the inter-communal local government body for the Mulhouse conurbation.

== See also ==
- Communes of the Haut-Rhin department
