= Habsheim =

Commune in Grand Est, France

- Commune
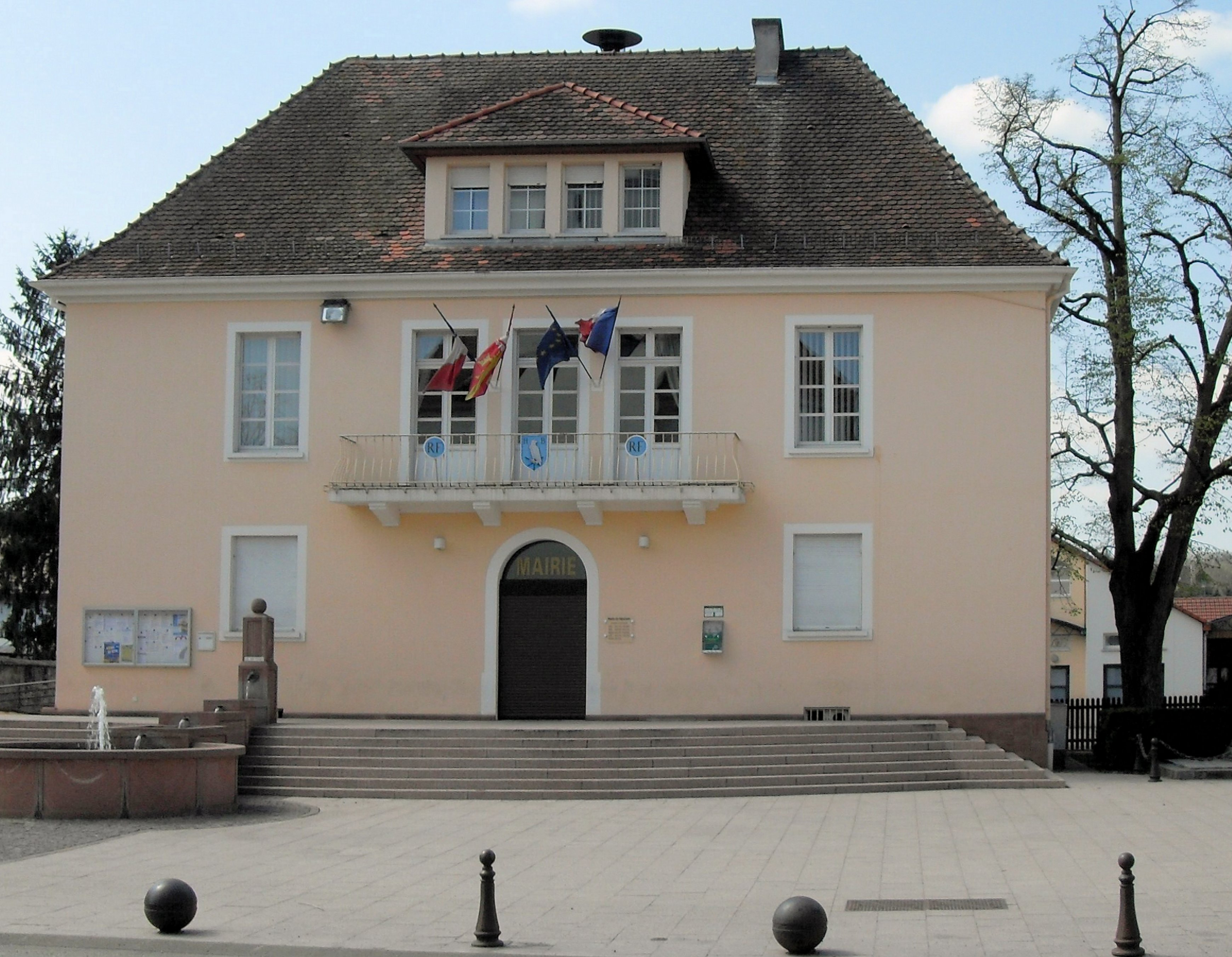
- The town hall in Habsheim

- Coat of arms
- Location of Habsheim
- Location within France Location within Grand Est
- Coordinates: 47°43′49″N 7°25′11″E
- Country: France
- Region: Grand Est
- Department: Haut-Rhin
- Arrondissement: Mulhouse
- Canton: Rixheim
- Intercommunality: Mulhouse Alsace Agglomération

Government
  - Mayor (2020–2026): Gilbert Fuchs
- Area^{1}: 15.63 km^{2} (6.03 sq mi)
- Elevation: 240 m (790 ft)
- Highest elevation: 318 m (1,043 ft)
- Lowest elevation: 236 m (774 ft)
- Population (2023): 5,076
  - Density: 324.8/km^{2} (841.1/sq mi)
- Time zone: UTC+01:00 (CET)
  - Summer (DST): UTC+02:00 (CEST)
- INSEE/Postal code: 68118 /68440
- ^{1} French Land Register data, which excludes lakes, ponds, glaciers > 1 km^{2} (0.386 sq mi or 247 acres) and river estuaries.

Habsheim (French pronunciation: [apsaim]) is a commune in the Haut-Rhin department in Alsace in north-eastern France. It forms part of the Mulhouse Alsace Agglomération, the inter-communal local government body for the Mulhouse conurbation.

== History ==
The Thalbahn Habsheim was a 24.6 km (15.3 mi) long narrow-gauge railway with a gauge of 600 mm (1 ft 11 5/8 in). It was built during World War I by German soldiers and Romanian prisoners of war as a military light railway.

== Population ==
Historical population
| Year | Pop. | ±% p.a. |
|---|---|---|
| 1968 | 2,207 | — |
| 1975 | 2,560 | +2.14% |
| 1982 | 3,644 | +5.17% |
| 1990 | 3,799 | +0.52% |
| 1999 | 4,313 | +1.42% |
| 2007 | 4,744 | +1.20% |
| 2012 | 4,944 | +0.83% |
| 2017 | 4,894 | −0.20% |
| 2023 | 5,076 | +0.61% |
Source: INSEE

== See also ==
- Communes of the Haut-Rhin département
- Mulhouse-Habsheim Airport
