= Sausheim =

Commune in Grand Est, France

Sausheim Sàuisa (Alemannic German)
- Commune
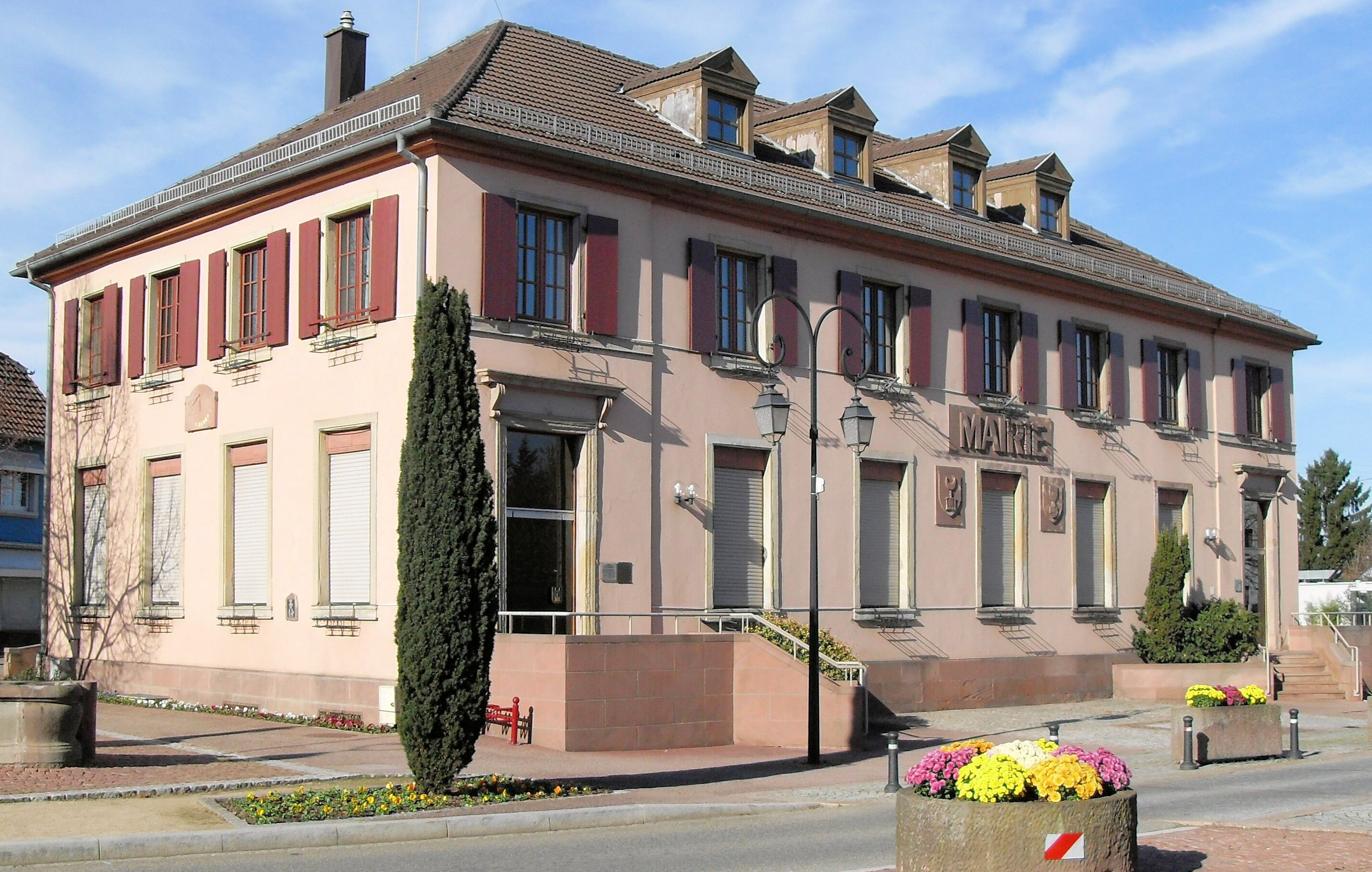
- The town hall in Sausheim

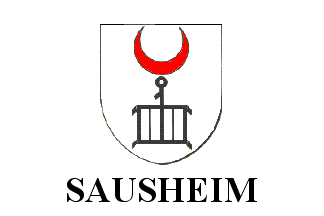
- Flag Coat of arms
- Location of Sausheim
- Location within France Location within Grand Est
- Coordinates: 47°47′15″N 7°22′26″E
- Country: France
- Region: Grand Est
- Department: Haut-Rhin
- Arrondissement: Mulhouse
- Canton: Rixheim
- Intercommunality: Mulhouse Alsace Agglomération

Government
  - Mayor (2020–2026): Guy Omeyer
- Area^{1}: 16.91 km^{2} (6.53 sq mi)
- Elevation: 230 m (750 ft)
- Highest elevation: 236 m (774 ft)
- Lowest elevation: 226 m (741 ft)
- Population (2023): 5,666
  - Density: 335.1/km^{2} (867.8/sq mi)
- Time zone: UTC+01:00 (CET)
  - Summer (DST): UTC+02:00 (CEST)
- INSEE/Postal code: 68300 /68390
- ^{1} French Land Register data, which excludes lakes, ponds, glaciers > 1 km^{2} (0.386 sq mi or 247 acres) and river estuaries.

Sausheim (Alsatian: Sàuisa or Sàise) is a commune in the French department of Haut-Rhin, Alsace, Grand Est, northeastern France. It forms part of the Mulhouse Alsace Agglomération, the inter-communal local government body for the Mulhouse conurbation.

== Population ==
Historical population
Year	Pop.	±% p.a.
1968	3,156	—
1975	4,940	+6.61%
1982	4,737	−0.60%
1990	4,748	+0.03%
1999	5,470	+1.59%
2007	5,280	−0.44%
2012	5,454	+0.65%
2017	5,501	+0.17%
2023	5,666	+0.49%
Source: INSEE

== See also ==
- Communes of the Haut-Rhin department
