= Riedisheim =

Commune in Grand Est, France

Riedisheim Riadasa (Alsatian)
- Commune
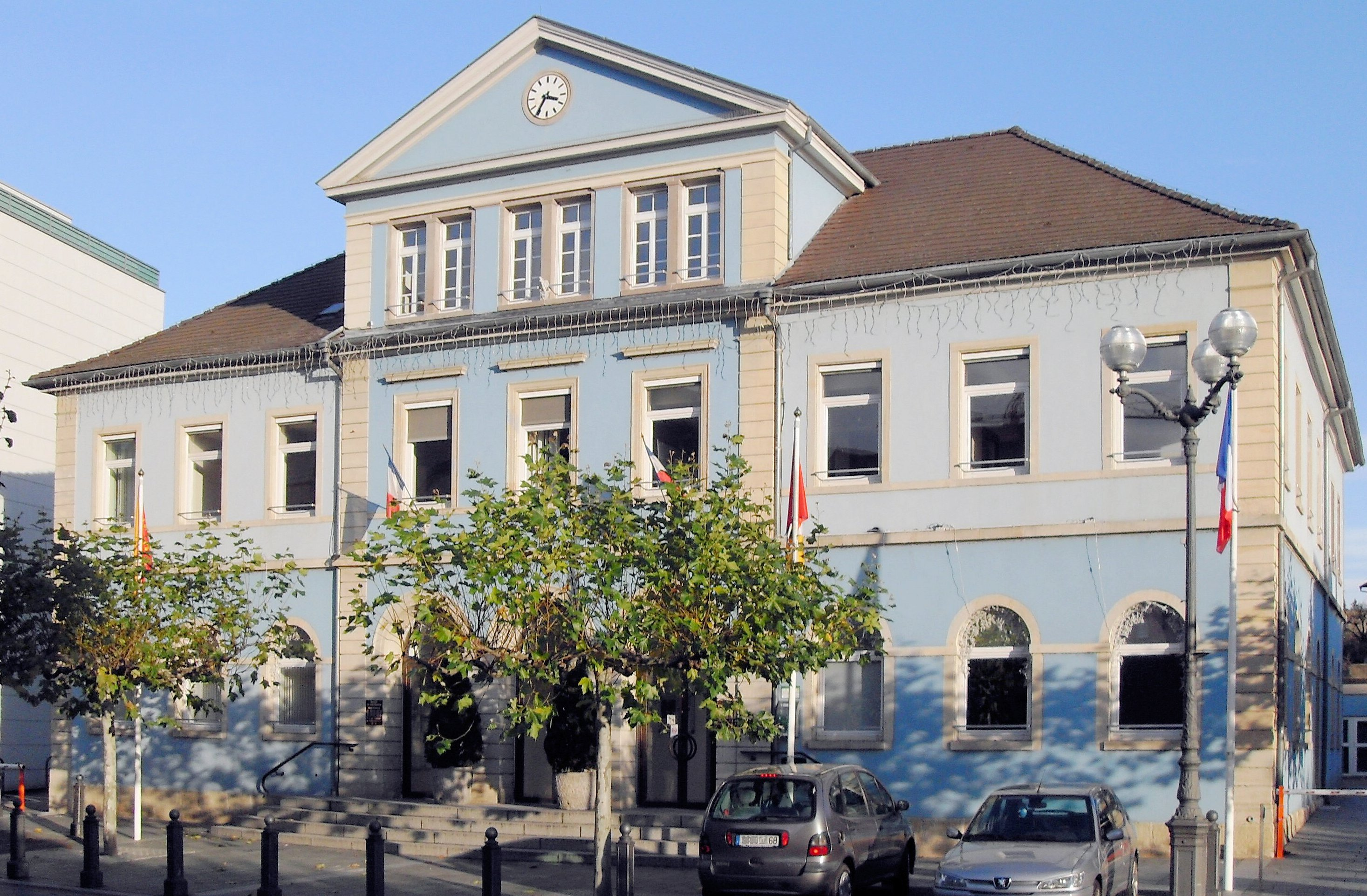
- The town hall in Riedisheim

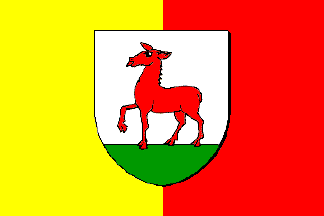
- Flag Coat of arms
- Location of Riedisheim
- Location within France Location within Grand Est
- Coordinates: 47°44′56″N 7°22′03″E
- Country: France
- Region: Grand Est
- Department: Haut-Rhin
- Arrondissement: Mulhouse
- Canton: Rixheim
- Intercommunality: Mulhouse Alsace Agglomération

Government
  - Mayor (2020–2026): Loïc Richard
- Area^{1}: 6.96 km^{2} (2.69 sq mi)
- Highest elevation: 345 m (1,132 ft)
- Lowest elevation: 232 m (761 ft)
- Population (2023): 12,200
  - Density: 1,750/km^{2} (4,540/sq mi)
- Time zone: UTC+01:00 (CET)
  - Summer (DST): UTC+02:00 (CEST)
- INSEE/Postal code: 68271 /68400
- ^{1} French Land Register data, which excludes lakes, ponds, glaciers > 1 km^{2} (0.386 sq mi or 247 acres) and river estuaries.

Riedisheim (French pronunciation: [ʁidisajm]), in Alsatian Riadasa (Alemannic German pronunciation: [ˈʁia̯dasa]), is a commune in the Haut-Rhin department, Alsace, region of Grand Est, northeastern France. It forms part of the Mulhouse Alsace Agglomération, the inter-communal local government body for the Mulhouse conurbation.

== Population ==
Historical population
Year	Pop.	±% p.a.
1968	9,811	—
1975	12,403	+3.41%
1982	12,175	−0.26%
1990	11,868	−0.32%
1999	12,101	+0.22%
2007	12,092	−0.01%
2012	12,012	−0.13%
2017	12,645	+1.03%
2023	12,200	−0.60%
Source: INSEE

== See also ==
- Communes of the Haut-Rhin department
