= Hombourg =

Commune in Grand Est, France

- Commune
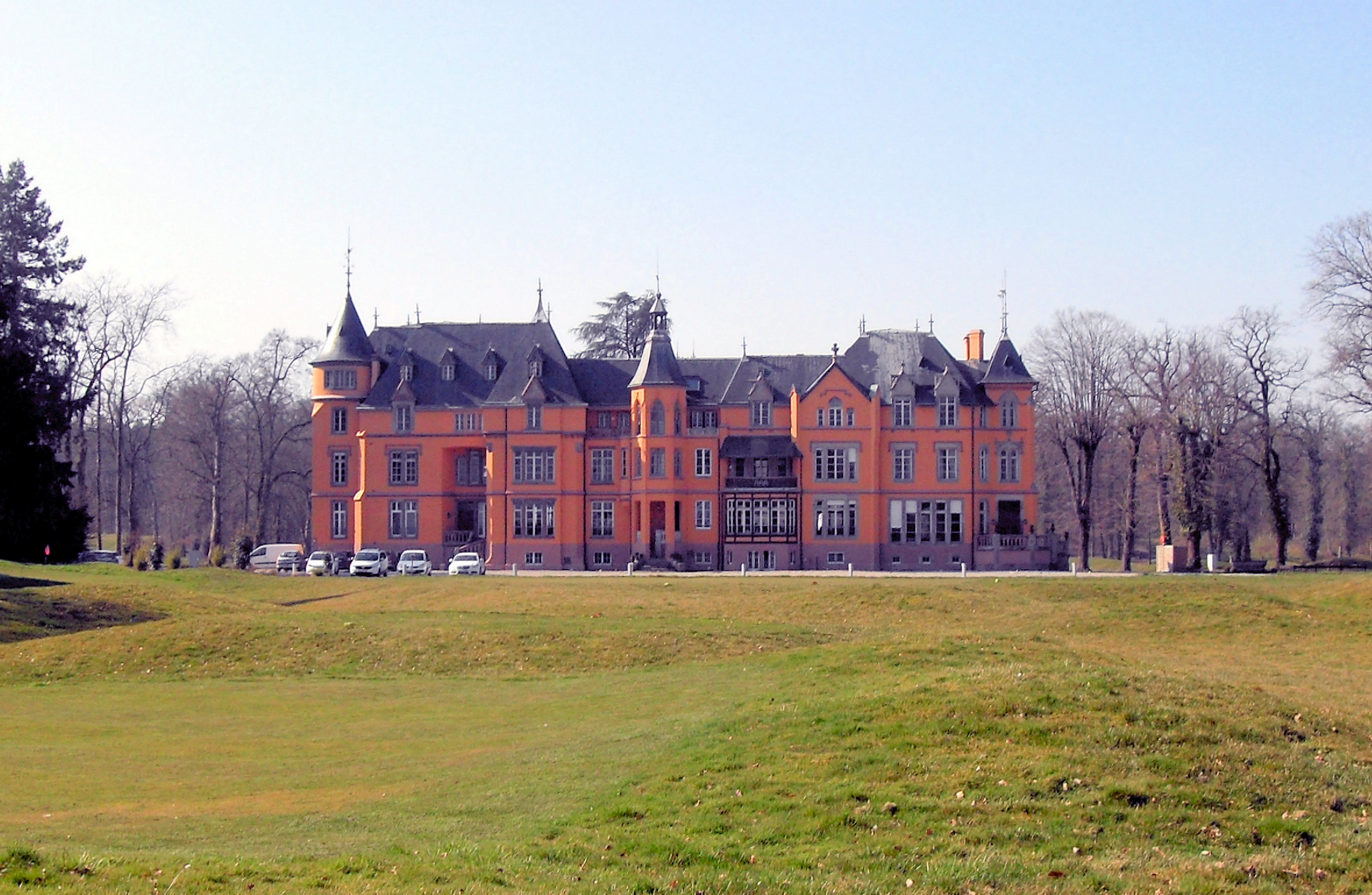
- The chateau in Hombourg

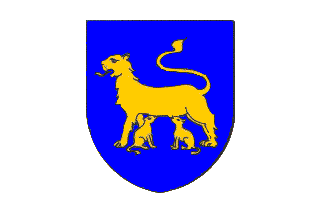
- Flag Coat of arms
- Location of Hombourg
- Location within France Location within Grand Est
- Coordinates: 47°45′35″N 7°30′22″E
- Country: France
- Region: Grand Est
- Department: Haut-Rhin
- Arrondissement: Mulhouse
- Canton: Rixheim
- Intercommunality: CA Mulhouse Alsace Agglomération

Government
  - Mayor (2020–2026): Thierry Engasser
- Area^{1}: 15.32 km^{2} (5.92 sq mi)
- Elevation: 227 m (745 ft)
- Highest elevation: 238 m (781 ft)
- Lowest elevation: 222 m (728 ft)
- Population (2023): 1,358
  - Density: 88.64/km^{2} (229.6/sq mi)
- Time zone: UTC+01:00 (CET)
  - Summer (DST): UTC+02:00 (CEST)
- INSEE/Postal code: 68144 /68490
- ^{1} French Land Register data, which excludes lakes, ponds, glaciers > 1 km^{2} (0.386 sq mi or 247 acres) and river estuaries.

Hombourg (French pronunciation: [ɔ̃buʁ]; German: Homburg) is a commune in the Haut-Rhin department in Alsace in north-eastern France.

== See also ==
- Communes of the Haut-Rhin département
