= Battenheim =

Commune in Grand Est, France

Battenheim Bàttene
- Commune
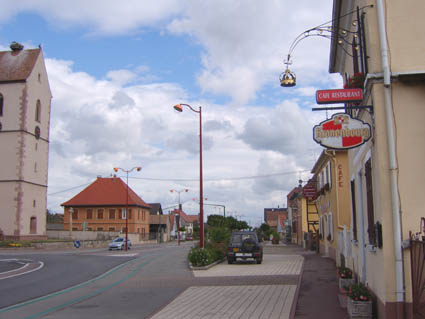
- A general view of Battenheim

- Coat of arms
- Location of Battenheim
- Location within France Location within Grand Est
- Coordinates: 47°49′14″N 7°22′57″E
- Country: France
- Region: Grand Est
- Department: Haut-Rhin
- Arrondissement: Mulhouse
- Canton: Rixheim
- Intercommunality: Mulhouse Alsace Agglomération

Government
  - Mayor (2020–2026): Maurice Guth
- Area^{1}: 16.88 km^{2} (6.52 sq mi)
- Highest elevation: 231 m (758 ft)
- Lowest elevation: 223 m (732 ft)
- Population (2023): 1,560
  - Density: 92.4/km^{2} (239/sq mi)
- Time zone: UTC+01:00 (CET)
  - Summer (DST): UTC+02:00 (CEST)
- INSEE/Postal code: 68022 /68390
- ^{1} French Land Register data, which excludes lakes, ponds, glaciers > 1 km^{2} (0.386 sq mi or 247 acres) and river estuaries.

Battenheim (French pronunciation: [batənaim]; Alsatian: Bàttene) is a commune in the Haut-Rhin department in Alsace in north-eastern France. It forms part of the Mulhouse Alsace Agglomération, the inter-communal local government body for the Mulhouse conurbation.

== See also ==
- Communes of the Haut-Rhin department
