= Petit-Landau =

Commune in Grand Est, France

- Commune
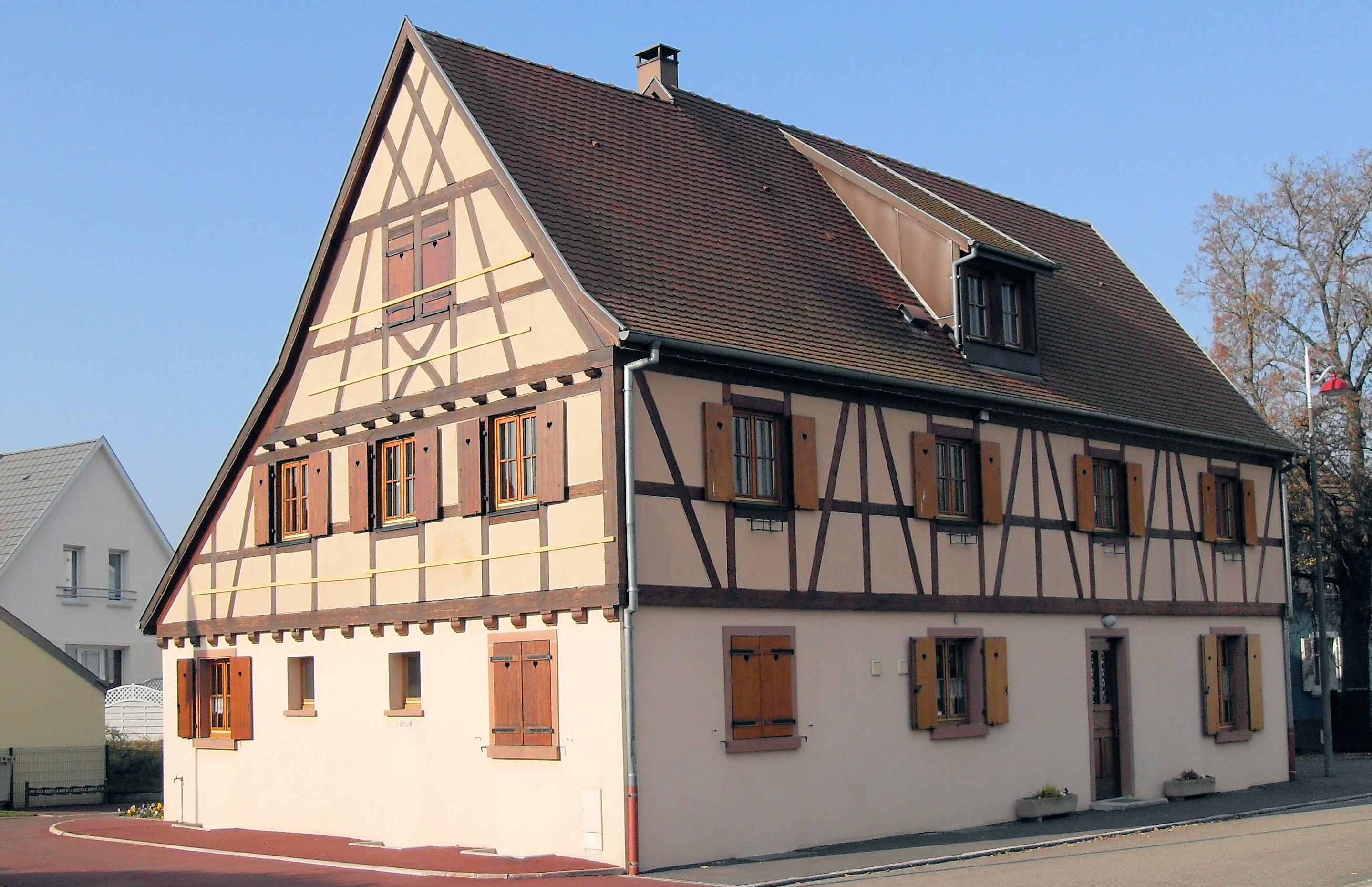
- The town hall in Petit-Landau

- Coat of arms
- Location of Petit-Landau
- Location within France Location within Grand Est
- Coordinates: 47°43′53″N 7°31′12″E
- Country: France
- Region: Grand Est
- Department: Haut-Rhin
- Arrondissement: Mulhouse
- Canton: Rixheim
- Intercommunality: CA Mulhouse Alsace Agglomération

Government
  - Mayor (2020–2026): Carole Talleux-Esslinger
- Area^{1}: 17.51 km^{2} (6.76 sq mi)
- Elevation: 229 m (751 ft)
- Highest elevation: 242 m (794 ft)
- Lowest elevation: 223 m (732 ft)
- Population (2023): 822
  - Density: 46.9/km^{2} (122/sq mi)
- Time zone: UTC+01:00 (CET)
  - Summer (DST): UTC+02:00 (CEST)
- INSEE/Postal code: 68254 /68490
- ^{1} French Land Register data, which excludes lakes, ponds, glaciers > 1 km^{2} (0.386 sq mi or 247 acres) and river estuaries.

Petit-Landau (French pronunciation: [pəti lɑ̃do]; German: Kleinlandau) is a commune in the Haut-Rhin department in Alsace in north-eastern France.

It lies along the Grand Canal d'Alsace.

== See also ==
- Communes of the Haut-Rhin department
