= Zimmersheim =

Commune in Grand Est, France

Zimmersheim Zímmersche
- Commune
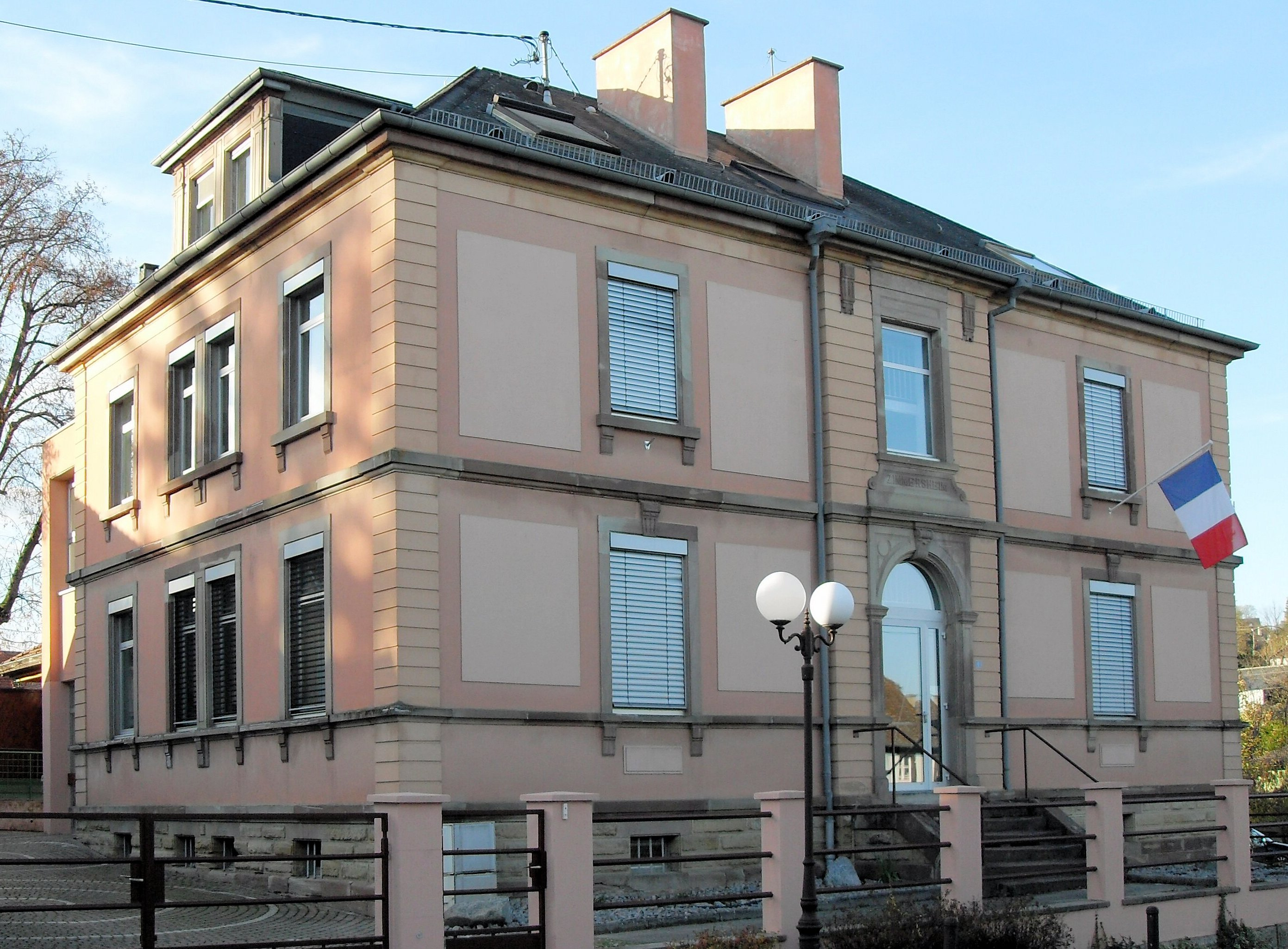
- The town hall and school in Zimmersheim

- Coat of arms
- Location of Zimmersheim
- Location within France Location within Grand Est
- Coordinates: 47°43′13″N 7°23′20″E
- Country: France
- Region: Grand Est
- Department: Haut-Rhin
- Arrondissement: Mulhouse
- Canton: Brunstatt-Didenheim
- Intercommunality: Mulhouse Alsace Agglomération

Government
  - Mayor (2020–2026): Philippe Sturchler
- Area^{1}: 3.15 km^{2} (1.22 sq mi)
- Elevation: 268 m (879 ft)
- Highest elevation: 360 m (1,180 ft)
- Lowest elevation: 255 m (837 ft)
- Population (2023): 1,083
  - Density: 344/km^{2} (890/sq mi)
- Demonym(s): Zimmersheimois, Zimmersheimoises
- Time zone: UTC+01:00 (CET)
  - Summer (DST): UTC+02:00 (CEST)
- INSEE/Postal code: 68386 /68440
- ^{1} French Land Register data, which excludes lakes, ponds, glaciers > 1 km^{2} (0.386 sq mi or 247 acres) and river estuaries.

Zimmersheim (Alemannic German: Zímmersche) is a commune in the Haut-Rhin department of Alsace in eastern France. It forms part of the Mulhouse Alsace Agglomération, the inter-communal local government body for the Mulhouse conurbation.

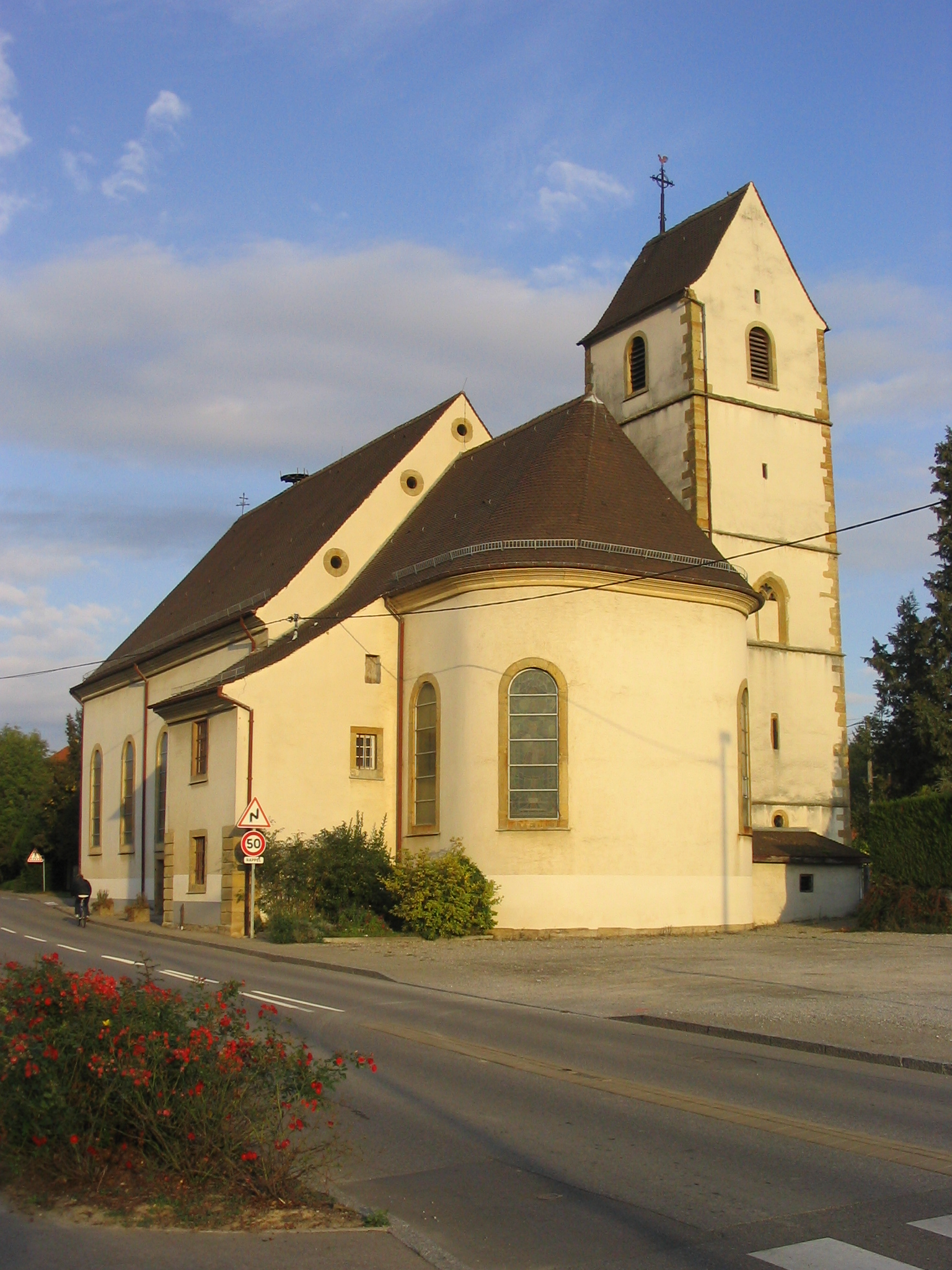
Church

== Population ==
Historical population

Year	Pop.	±% p.a.
1793	406	—
1821	493	+0.70%
1846	630	+0.99%
1871	605	−0.16%
1900	509	−0.59%
1926	414	−0.79%
1946	379	−0.44%
1962	331	−0.84%
1968	368	+1.78%

Year	Pop.	±% p.a.
1975	697	+9.55%
1982	826	+2.46%
1990	931	+1.51%
1999	1,024	+1.06%
2007	1,010	−0.17%
2012	1,114	+1.98%
2017	1,016	−1.82%
2023	1,083	+1.07%

Source: EHESS (1793-1999) and INSEE

== See also ==
- Communes of the Haut-Rhin department
