= Baldersheim =

Commune in Grand Est, France

- Commune
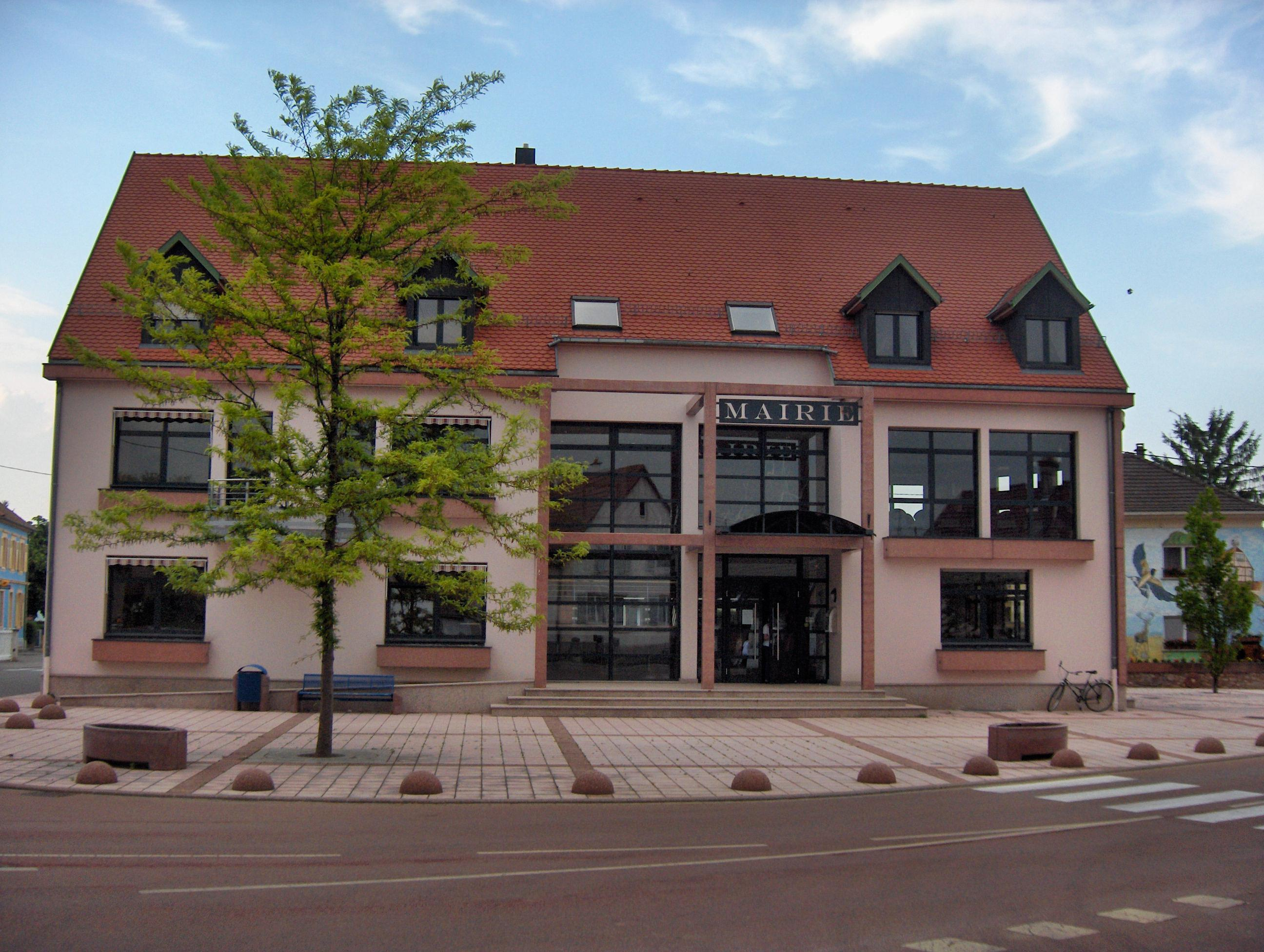
- Baldersheim Town Hall

- Coat of arms
- Location of Baldersheim
- Location within France Location within Grand Est
- Coordinates: 47°48′03″N 7°22′52″E
- Country: France
- Region: Grand Est
- Department: Haut-Rhin
- Arrondissement: Mulhouse
- Canton: Rixheim
- Intercommunality: Mulhouse Alsace Agglomération

Government
  - Mayor (2020–2026): Pierre Logel
- Area^{1}: 12.76 km^{2} (4.93 sq mi)
- Elevation: 227 m (745 ft)
- Highest elevation: 233 m (764 ft)
- Lowest elevation: 225 m (738 ft)
- Population (2023): 2,596
  - Density: 203.4/km^{2} (526.9/sq mi)
- Time zone: UTC+01:00 (CET)
  - Summer (DST): UTC+02:00 (CEST)
- INSEE/Postal code: 68015 /68390
- ^{1} French Land Register data, which excludes lakes, ponds, glaciers > 1 km^{2} (0.386 sq mi or 247 acres) and river estuaries.

Baldersheim (French pronunciation: [baldəʁsaim]) is a commune in the Haut-Rhin department in Alsace in north-eastern France. It forms part of the Mulhouse Alsace Agglomération, the inter-communal local government body for the Mulhouse conurbation.

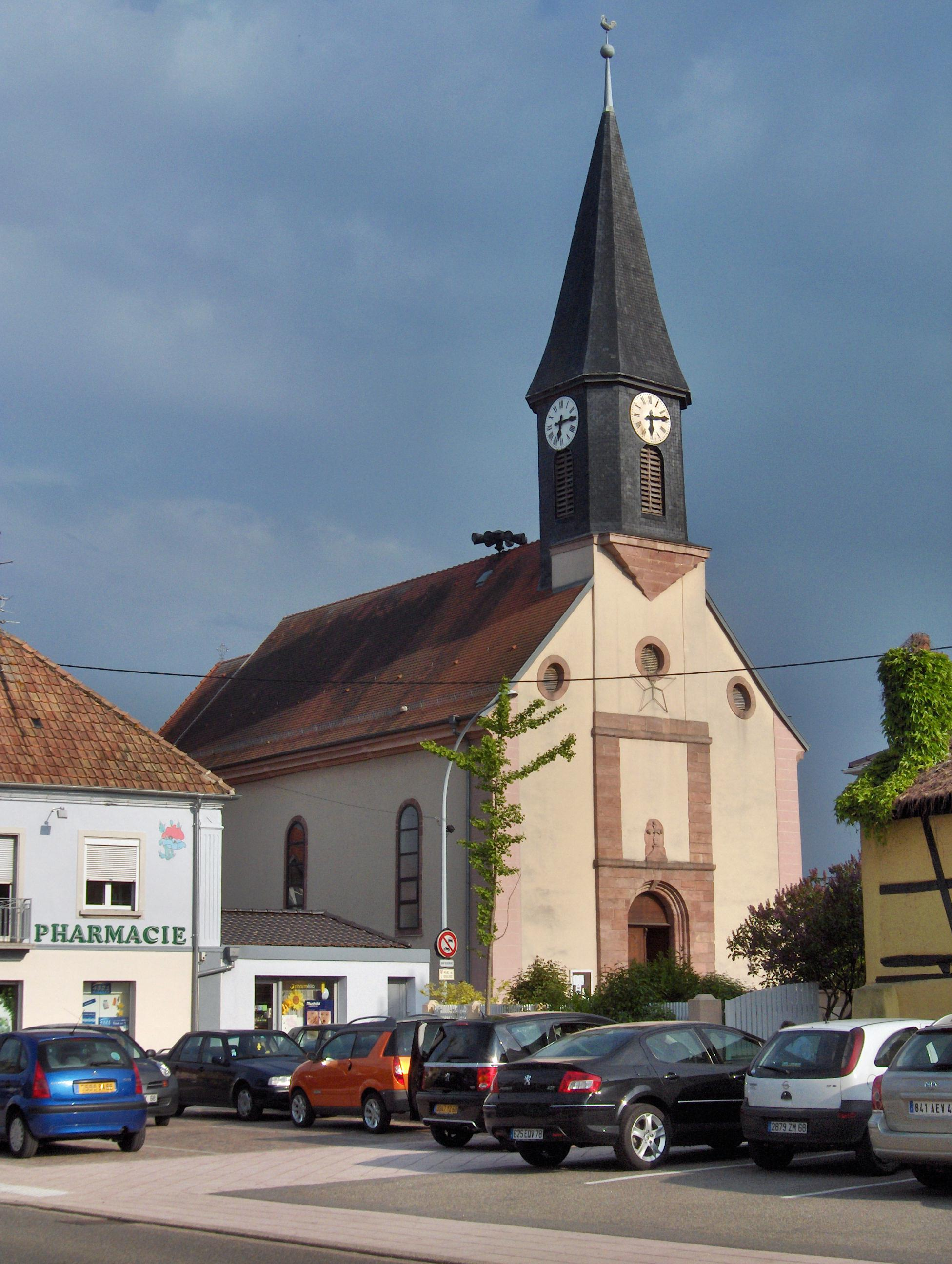
Church of St. Peter and St. Paul in Baldersheim, France

== Population ==
Historical population
Year	Pop.	±% p.a.
1968	981	—
1975	1,474	+5.99%
1982	1,837	+3.20%
1990	2,238	+2.50%
1999	2,206	−0.16%
2007	2,519	+1.67%
2012	2,603	+0.66%
2017	2,616	+0.10%
2023	2,596	−0.13%
Source: INSEE

== Etymology ==
Baldersheim was first attested as Balthersheim in 976, and is of Germanic origin. The toponym derives from the genitive of anthroponym Baldo (see *balþaz), with suffix -heim pointing to Germanic *-haim. This toponymic pattern is common in the departments of Moselle, Bas Rhin and Haut Rhin.

== See also ==
- Communes of the Haut-Rhin department
