= Harry Shaffer (disambiguation) =

Harry Shaffer or similar may refer to:

- Harry Schaeffer (1924–2008), American baseball pitcher
- Harry Schafer (1846–1935), American baseball player
- Harry Schaffer (fl. 1990s–2010s), Swiss artist
- Harry G. Shaffer (1919–2009), Austrian-American economist
- Harry G. Shaffer (politician) (fl. 1920s), President of the West Virginia Senate

== See also ==
- Harold Schafer (1912–2001), North Dakota businessman
