= Schönenbuch =

- Municipality
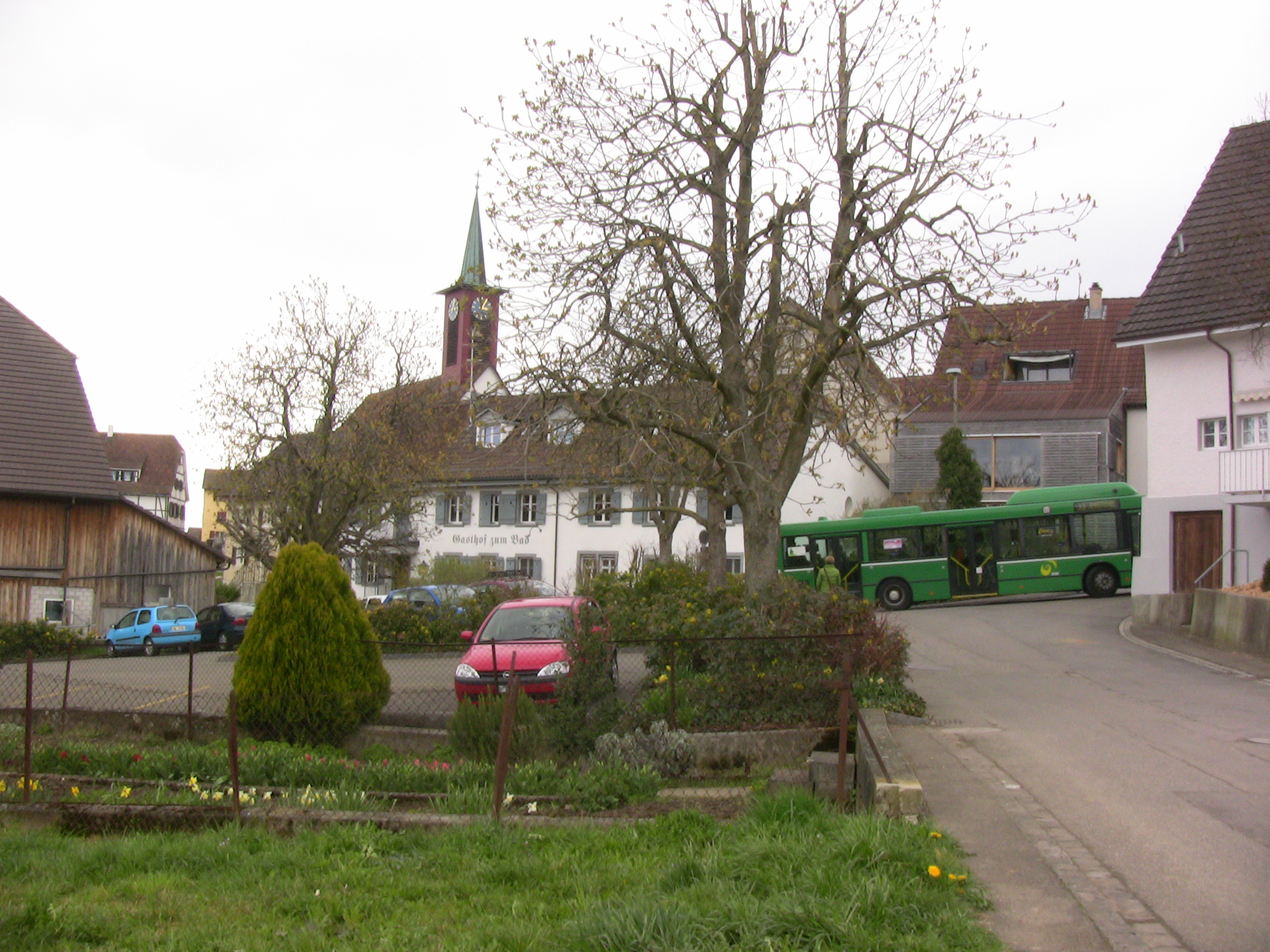

- Coat of arms
- Location of Schönenbuch
- Location within Switzerland Location within Canton of Basel-Landschaft
- Coordinates: 47°32′N 7°29′E
- Country: Switzerland
- Canton: Basel-Landschaft
- District: Arlesheim

Area
  - Total: 1.36 km^{2} (0.53 sq mi)
- Elevation: 355 m (1,165 ft)

Population (June 2021)
  - Total: 1,442
  - Density: 1,060/km^{2} (2,750/sq mi)
- Time zone: UTC+01:00 (CET)
  - Summer (DST): UTC+02:00 (CEST)
- Postal code: 4124
- SFOS number: 2774
- ISO 3166 code: CH-BL
- Surrounded by: Allschwil, Buschwiller (FR-68), Hagenthal-le-Bas (FR-68), Neuwiller (FR-68)
- Website: www.schoenenbuch.ch

Schönenbuch (Swiss German: Schönebuech) is a municipality in the district of Arlesheim in the canton of Basel-Landschaft in Switzerland.

== History ==
Schönenbuch is first mentioned in 1315 as Schoenenbuoch. It became an independent municipality in 1816.

== Geography ==
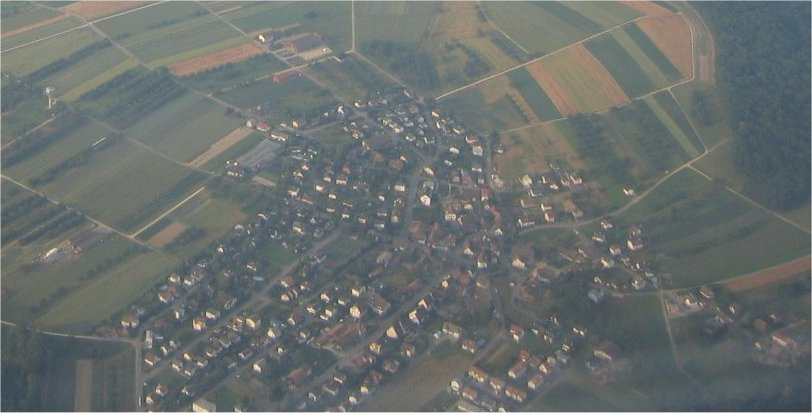
Schoenenbuch from approximately 2000 ft.

Schönenbuch has an area, as of 2009, of 1.36 square kilometers (0.53 sq mi). Of this area, 0.89 km^{2} (0.34 sq mi) or 65.4% is used for agricultural purposes, while 0.02 km^{2} (0.0077 sq mi) or 1.5% is forested. Of the rest of the land, 0.42 km^{2} (0.16 sq mi) or 30.9% is settled (buildings or roads).

Of the built up area, industrial buildings made up 2.9% of the total area while housing and buildings made up 19.9% and transportation infrastructure made up 7.4%. Out of the forested land, all of the forested land area is covered with heavy forests. Of the agricultural land, 47.1% is used for growing crops and 7.4% is pastures, while 11.0% is used for orchards or vine crops.

The municipality is located in the Arlesheim district, on the edge of the Sundgau and bordered by France on three sides. It is at an elevation of 355 m (1,165 ft) above sea level and is the second smallest municipality in the canton of Basel-Country. The village is enclosed on three sides by France (municipalities Neuwiller and Hagenthal-le-Bas). Only in the northeast does it have a connection to the town of Allschwil.

It consists of the haufendorf village (an irregular, unplanned and quite closely packed village, built around a central square) of Schönenbuch.

== Coat of arms ==
The blazon of the municipal coat of arms is Argent, a Tree Gules issuant from Coupeaux Vert.

A red beech tree on a silver background on a green three-mountain. The beech stands for the municipality name Buche (which is German for beech) and the three-mountain for the altitude of the village.

== Demographics ==
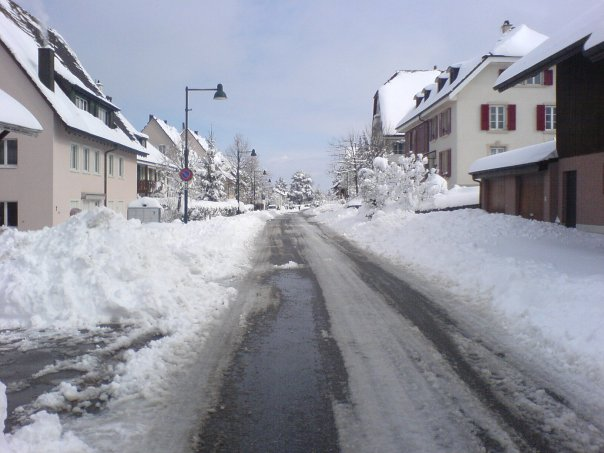
Basel street in Schönenbuch

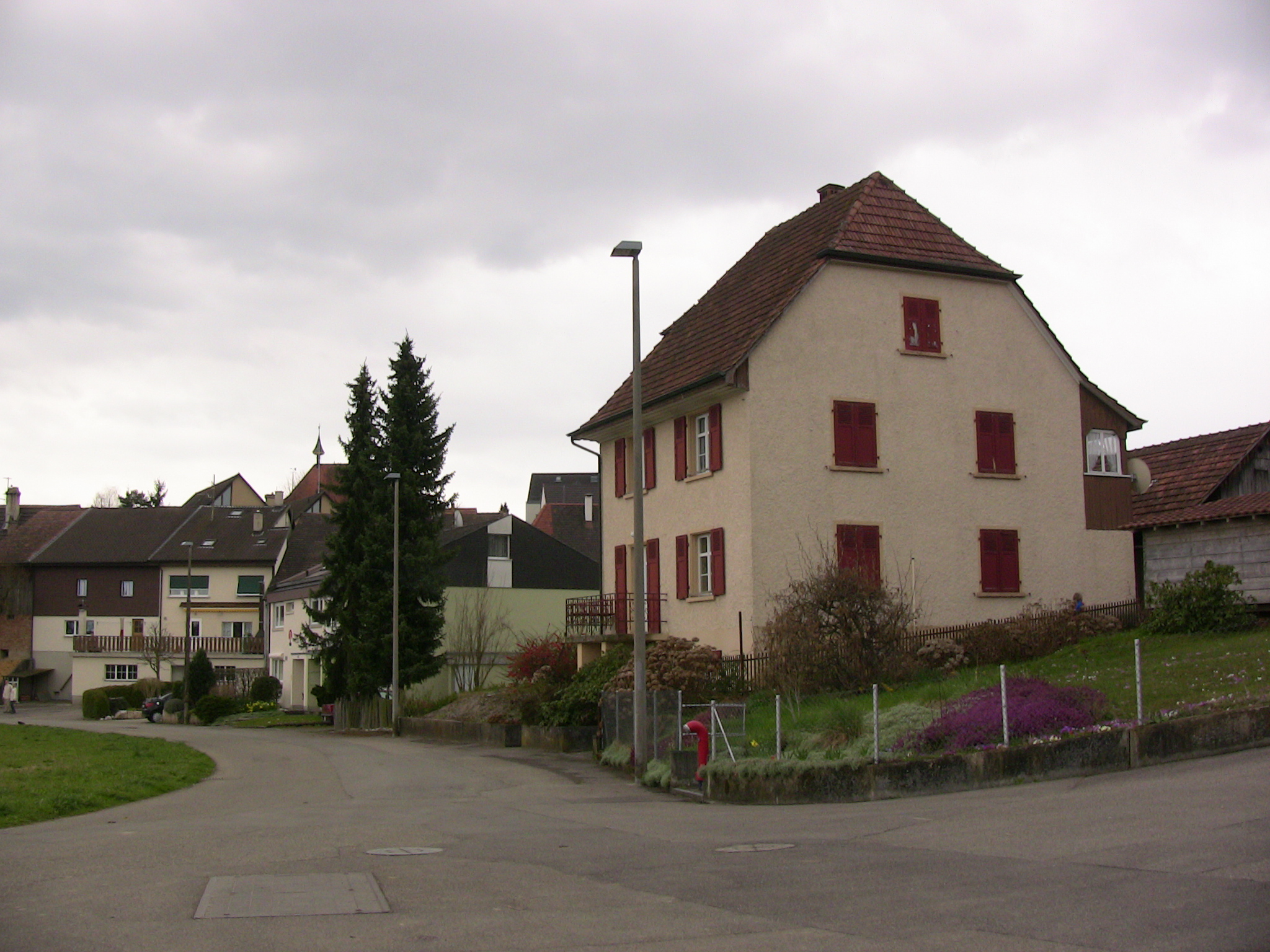
Houses in Schönenbuch

Schönenbuch has a population (as of June 2021) of 1,442. As of 2008, 9.2% of the population are resident foreign nationals. Over the last 10 years (1997–2007) the population has changed at a rate of 24.9%.

Most of the population (as of 2000) speaks German (1,178 or 94.6%), with French being second most common (22 or 1.8%) and English being third (17 or 1.4%).

As of 2008, the gender distribution of the population was 49.4% male and 50.6% female. The population was made up of 1,298 Swiss citizens (89.8% of the population), and 148 non-Swiss residents (10.2%) Of the population in the municipality 287 or about 23.1% were born in Schönenbuch and lived there in 2000. There were 244 or 19.6% who were born in the same canton, while 521 or 41.8% were born somewhere else in Switzerland, and 184 or 14.8% were born outside of Switzerland.

In 2008 there were 13 live births to Swiss citizens and 3 births to non-Swiss citizens, and in same time span there were 4 deaths of Swiss citizens and 1 non-Swiss citizen death. Ignoring immigration and emigration, the population of Swiss citizens increased by 9 while the foreign population increased by 2. There was 1 Swiss man who immigrated back to Switzerland and 2 Swiss women who emigrated from Switzerland. At the same time, there were 3 non-Swiss men and 1 non-Swiss woman who immigrated from another country to Switzerland. The total Swiss population change in 2008 (from all sources, including moves across municipal borders) was a decrease of 7 and the non-Swiss population change was an increase of 18 people. This represents a population growth rate of 0.8%.

The age distribution, as of 2010, in Schönenbuch is; 98 children or 6.8% of the population are between 0 and 6 years old and 216 teenagers or 14.9% are between 7 and 19. Of the adult population, 140 people or 9.7% of the population are between 20 and 29 years old. 164 people or 11.3% are between 30 and 39, 263 people or 18.2% are between 40 and 49, and 312 people or 21.6% are between 50 and 64. The senior population distribution is 203 people or 14.0% of the population are between 65 and 79 years old and there are 50 people or 3.5% who are over 80.

As of 2000, there were 467 people who were single and never married in the municipality. There were 685 married individuals, 49 widows or widowers and 44 individuals who are divorced.

As of 2000, there were 499 private households in the municipality, and an average of 2.5 persons per household. There were 106 households that consist of only one person and 30 households with five or more people. Out of a total of 505 households that answered this question, 21.0% were households made up of just one person and 3 were adults who lived with their parents. Of the rest of the households, there are 188 married couples without children, 170 married couples with children There were 25 single parents with a child or children. There were 7 households that were made up unrelated people and 6 households that were made some sort of institution or another collective housing.

In 2000 there were 312 single family homes (or 78.6% of the total) out of a total of 397 inhabited buildings. There were 32 multi-family buildings (8.1%), along with 39 multi-purpose buildings that were mostly used for housing (9.8%) and 14 other use buildings (commercial or industrial) that also had some housing (3.5%). Of the single family homes 11 were built before 1919, while 87 were built between 1990 and 2000. The greatest number of single family homes (81) were built between 1981 and 1990.

In 2000 there were 505 apartments in the municipality. The most common apartment size was 5 rooms of which there were 195. There were 3 single room apartments and 277 apartments with five or more rooms. Of these apartments, a total of 487 apartments (96.4% of the total) were permanently occupied, while 9 apartments (1.8%) were seasonally occupied and 9 apartments (1.8%) were empty. As of 2007, the construction rate of new housing units was 0.7 new units per 1000 residents. As of 2000 the average price to rent a two-room apartment was about .00 CHF (US$0, £0, €0), a three-room apartment was about 1256.00 CHF (US$1000, £570, €800) and a four-room apartment cost an average of 1468.00 CHF (US$1170, £660, €940). The vacancy rate for the municipality, in 2008, was 0.17%.

The historical population is given in the following chart:

== Politics ==
In the 2007 federal election the most popular party was the SVP which received 33.58% of the vote. The next three most popular parties were the FDP (19.63%), the SP (18.63%) and the CVP (13.9%). In the federal election, a total of 577 votes were cast, and the voter turnout was 55.1%.

== Economy ==
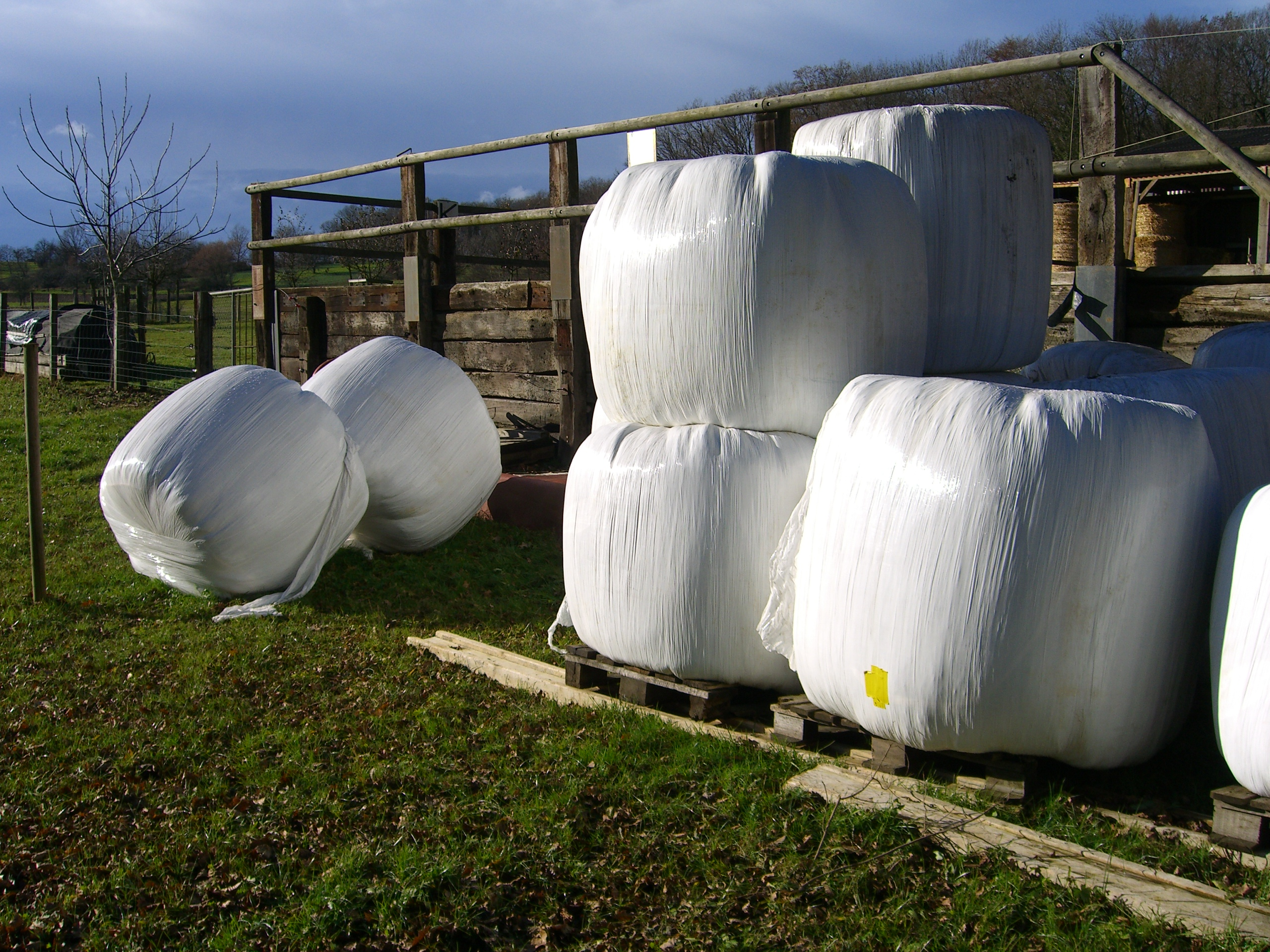
Hay bales from a farm outside Schönenbuch

As of 2007, Schönenbuch had an unemployment rate of 1.76%. As of 2005, there were 47 people employed in the primary economic sector and about 13 businesses involved in this sector. 90 people were employed in the secondary sector and there were 15 businesses in this sector. 214 people were employed in the tertiary sector, with 43 businesses in this sector. There were 654 residents of the municipality who were employed in some capacity, of which females made up 41.4% of the workforce.

In 2008 the total number of full-time equivalent jobs was 293. The number of jobs in the primary sector was 18, all of which were in agriculture. The number of jobs in the secondary sector was 39, of which 27 or (69.2%) were in manufacturing and 12 (30.8%) were in construction. The number of jobs in the tertiary sector was 236. In the tertiary sector; 47 or 19.9% were in wholesale or retail sales or the repair of motor vehicles, 77 or 32.6% were in the movement and storage of goods, 9 or 3.8% were in a hotel or restaurant, 1 or 0.4% were in the information industry, 61 or 25.8% were technical professionals or scientists, 19 or 8.1% were in education.

In 2000, there were 319 workers who commuted into the municipality and 537 workers who commuted away. The municipality is a net exporter of workers, with about 1.7 workers leaving the municipality for every one entering. About 29.5% of the workforce coming into Schönenbuch are coming from outside Switzerland, while 0.4% of the locals commute out of Switzerland for work. Of the working population, 20.6% used public transportation to get to work, and 51.8% used a private car.

== Religion ==
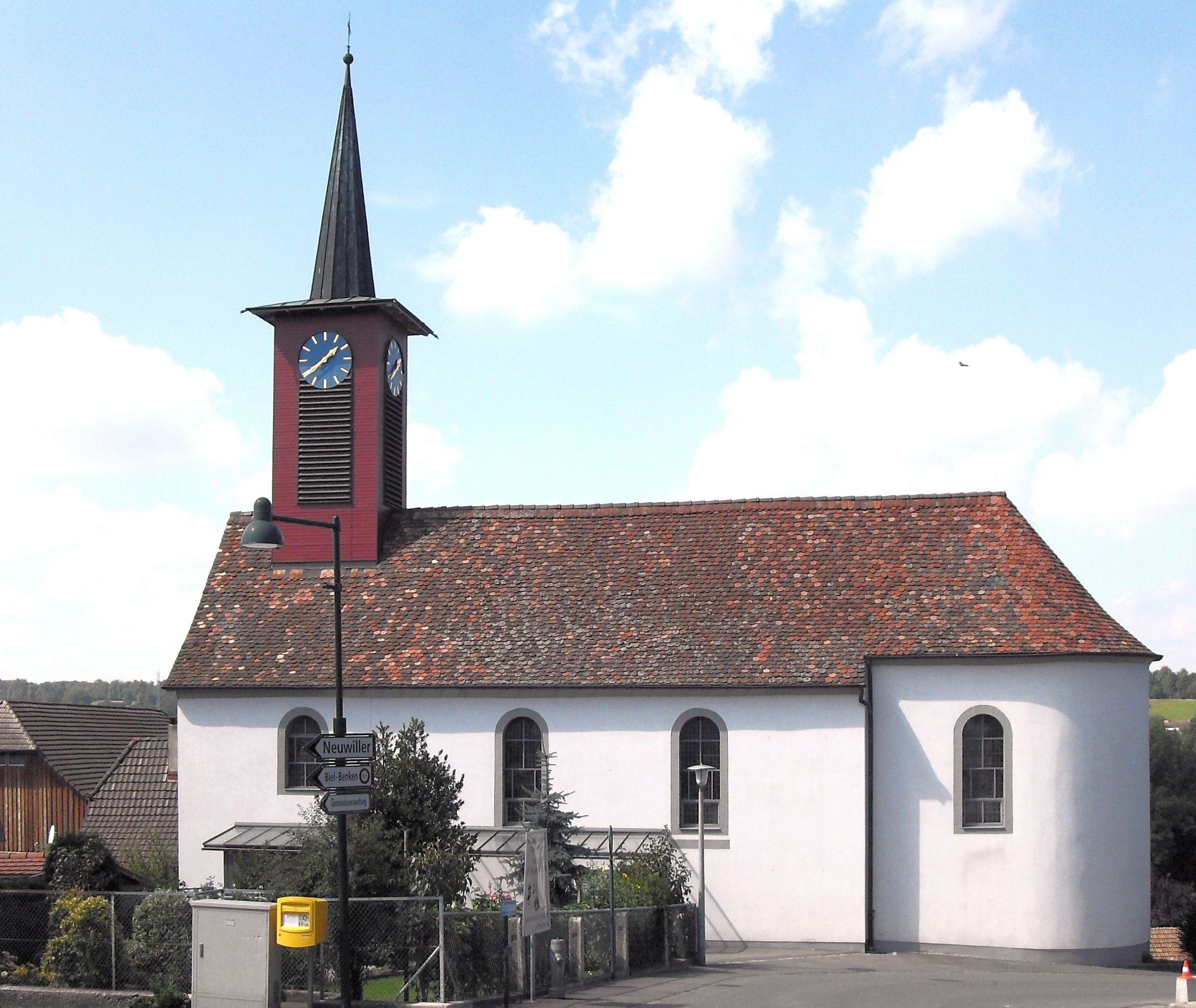
Church in Schönenbuch

From the 2000 census, 549 or 44.1% were Roman Catholic, while 409 or 32.9% belonged to the Swiss Reformed Church. Of the rest of the population, there were 2 members of an Orthodox church (or about 0.16% of the population), there were 12 individuals (or about 0.96% of the population) who belonged to the Christian Catholic Church, and there were 26 individuals (or about 2.09% of the population) who belonged to another Christian church. There were 14 (or about 1.12% of the population) who were Islamic. There were 1 individuals who were Buddhist and 227 (or about 18.23% of the population) belonged to no church, are agnostic or atheist, and 5 individuals (or about 0.40% of the population) did not answer the question.

== Education ==
In Schönenbuch about 560 or (45.0%) of the population have completed non-mandatory upper secondary education, and 265 or (21.3%) have completed additional higher education (either university or a Fachhochschule). Of the 265 who completed tertiary schooling, 61.1% were Swiss men, 29.4% were Swiss women, 6.0% were non-Swiss men and 3.4% were non-Swiss women. As of 2000, there were 2 students in Schönenbuch who came from another municipality, while 122 residents attended schools outside the municipality.

== Gallery ==
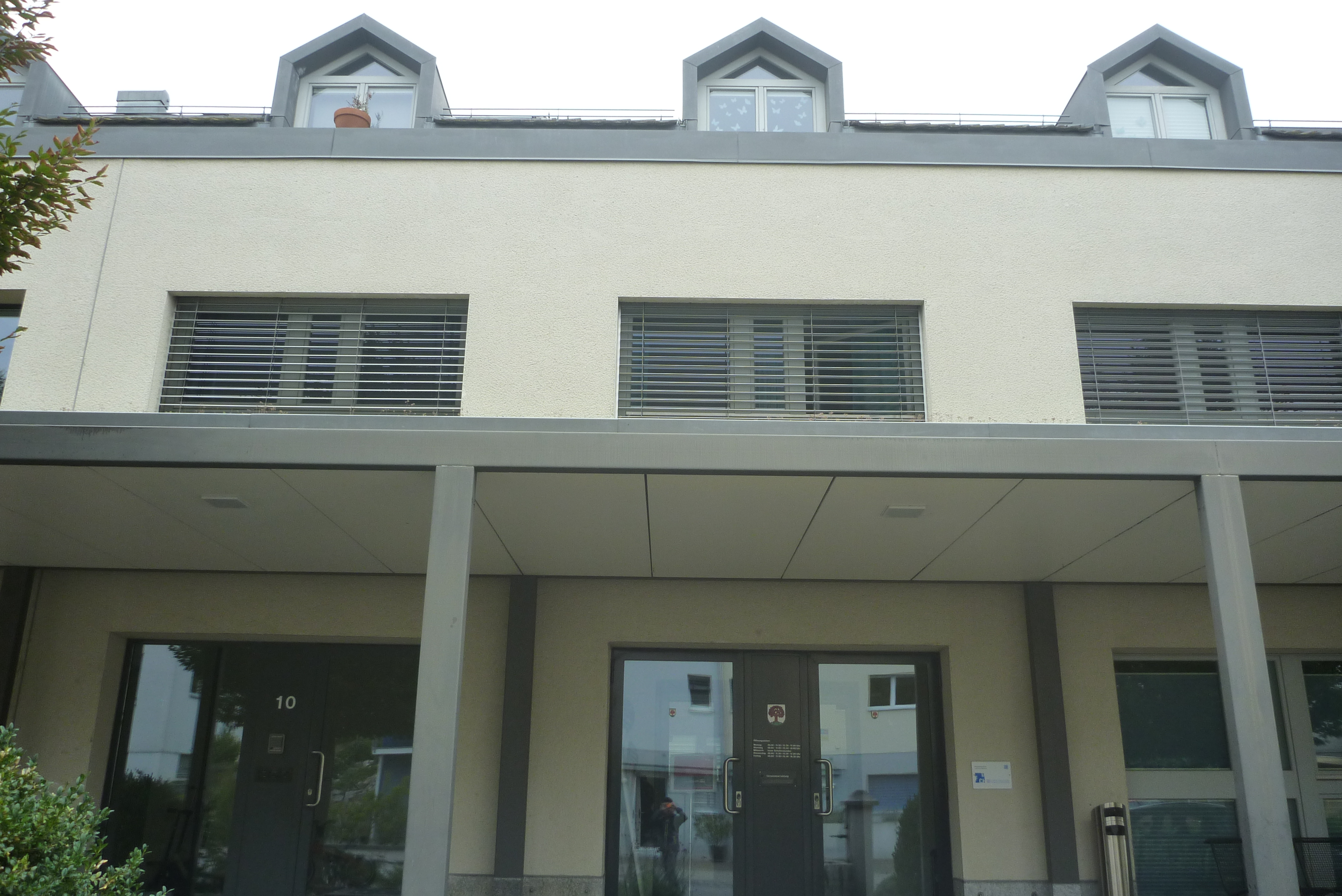
Local government Schönenbuch

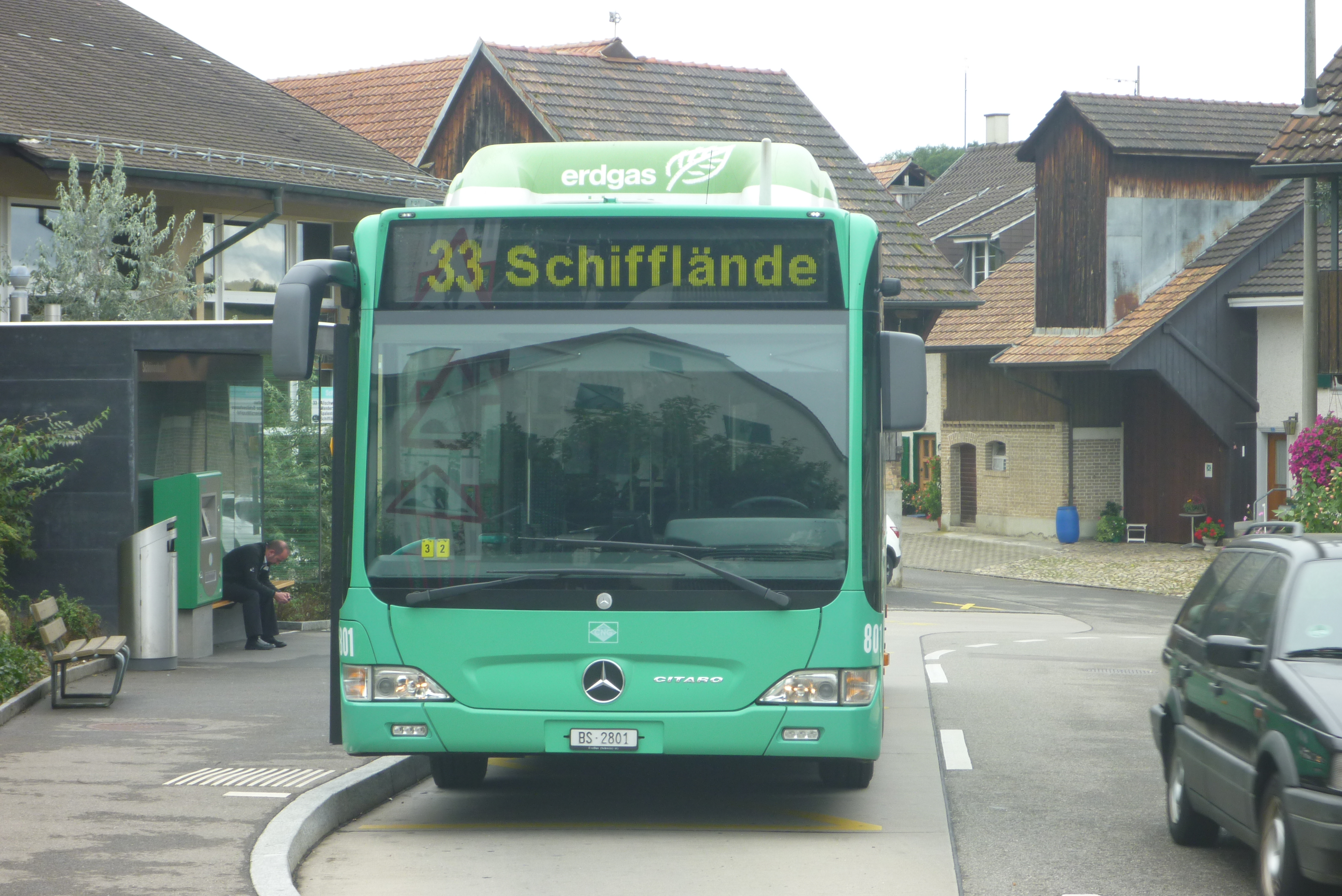
Bus in Schönenbuch.

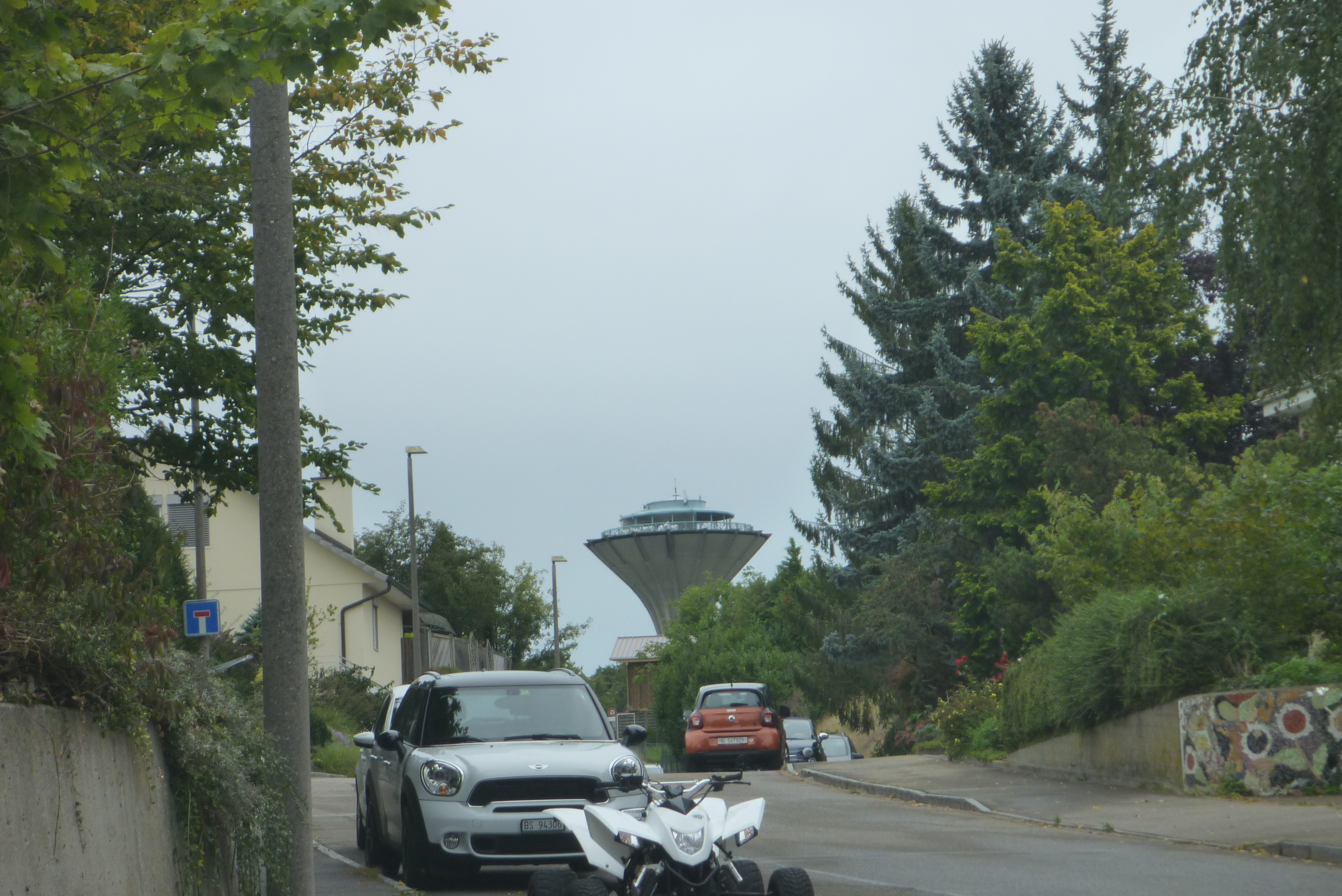
Street with the water tower from Allschwil.
