= Heidi Baader-Nobs =

Swiss composer (born 1940)

Heidi Baader-Nobs (born 5 December 1940) is a Swiss composer. She was born in Delémont, and studied violin and piano at school before training as a teacher at the Ecole Normale in Delémont. She later studied composition and music theory with Robert Suter and Jacques Wildberger at the Basle Musik-Akademie. In 2018 Baader-Nobs was commissioned to compose a piece for the Festival frauenkomponiert (Women Composed) 2018.

== Life ==
Heidi Baader-Nobs was born Heidi Nobs on 5 December 1940 in Delémont, Switzerland. She studied violin and piano at school, and then trained as a teacher at the Ecole Normale in Delémont. Baader-Nobs first trained in violin at the Basel Music Academy under Rodolfo Felicani, but after recurrent problems with inflammation of her right arm, she gave up playing violin. She studied composition and music theory with Robert Suter and Jacques Wildberger, also at the Basel Music Academy. Baader-Nobs compositions use dodecaphonic (twelve-tone) and serial techniques. Later works show her interest in graphic scores. Her compositions are considered to be influenced by the work of Pierre Boulez and Iannis Xenakis. Baader-Nobs has composed for orchestra, chamber orchestra, piano, electronic keyboard, and has also written vocal music.

Baader-Nobs was commissioned to compose a piece for the Festival frauenkomponiert (Women Composed) 2018. Baader-Nobs composed the piece Evasion, scored for solo viola and orchestra. The piece premiered on 11 March 2018, at the French Church, Berne.

Baader-Nobs settled in Allschwil, and is married to Claudius Baader and has three children. She interrupted her career in the 1970s to meet her family responsibilities, but later returned to composing in 1980.

== Works ==
Selected works by Baader-Nobs include:

- Duo (1986)
- Bifurcation for tuba and piano
