= Yves Vladislav =

Swiss footballer (born 1998)

Personal information
- Date of birth: 12 May 1998 (age 28)
- Place of birth: Allschwil, Switzerland
- Position: Midfielder

Team information
- Current team: OFK Beograd
- Number: 15

Youth career
- –2014: Allschwil
- 2014–2015: Basel
- 2015–2016: Allschwil
- 2016: Heart of Midlothian
- 2017: Teleoptik

Senior career*
Years	Team	Apps	(Gls)
2017–2018	Teleoptik	0	(0)
2018–2019	Sinđelić Beograd	11	(1)
2019–	OFK Beograd	0	(0)
- * Club domestic league appearances and goals as of 1 July 2019

Yves Vladislav (born 12 May 1998) is a Swiss footballer playing as a midfielder for Serbian side OFK Beograd.

Born in Allschwil, Vladislav begin playing in Switzerland with the youth teams of Allschwil and Basel. In the summer of 2016 he joined Scottish side Heart of Midlothian. He made two appearances for Hearts U-20 in the 2016–17 Scottish Challenge Cup. During the winter break, he moved to Serbia and joined the youth-team of FK Partizan´s satellite club Teleoptik. In the following season he joined the first-team, but failed to debut in the league. In summer 2018 he moved to another Serbian club, second-level side Sinđelić Beograd. With Sinđelić he debuted in the 2018–19 Serbian First League.

== Career statistics ==
As of 8 December 2018.

Club	Season	League			Cup		Continental		Other		Total	
Club	Season	Division	Apps	Goals	Apps	Goals	Apps	Goals	Apps	Goals	Apps	Goals
Sinđelić Beograd	2018–19	Serbian First League	2	0	2 (Note: Appearances in the Serbian Cup)	0	–		0	0	4	0
Career total			2	0	2	0	0	0	0	0	4	0
