= Medgate =

- Industry: Telemedicine
- Founded: 1999; 27 years ago
- Founders: Andy Fischer
- Headquarters: Allschwil (Basel-Landschaft), Switzerland
- Key people: Andy Fischer (CEO, co-founder)
- Products: Telemedicine consultations; electronic prescriptions; medical hotlines for health insurers
- Revenue: €42 million (2022/23)
- Number of employees: 650 (2022/23)
- Parent: Otto Group
- Website: medgate.ch

Medgate is a Swiss telemedicine company headquartered in Allschwil. Since March 2022, the company has been a majority-owned subsidiary of the German Otto Group.

== History ==
Medgate was founded in 1999 in Basel by Andy Fischer, a former flight emergency physician.

In 2006, the Swiss telecommunications company Swisscom acquired a strategic minority stake of around 40 per cent in Medgate.

Since 2014, Medgate has been expanding to other countries including the Philippines and Germany. In Germany, Medgate began operations with Rhön-Klinikum as a national partner. In 2020, Rhön-Klinikum sold its shares to Medgate Holding AG and terminated the partnership.

In 2022, the German Otto Group acquired a majority stake in Medgate Holding AG, by subscribing to all new shares created in a capital increase and buying out the existing shareholders Swisscom and Aevis. As part of the same transaction, Medgate Holding AG acquired the Cologne-based medical-referral service BetterDoc GmbH.

On 30 August and 4 September 2023, parts of Medgate's IT infrastructure were the target of cyberattacks. Medgate's security systems detected the intrusion attempts, and the company stated that, on the basis of its initial forensic findings, no patient data or sensitive corporate data had been exfiltrated and no systems had been encrypted. To isolate potentially affected systems, Medgate temporarily shut down parts of its infrastructure, leading to long waiting times on its telephone lines and to outages of the Medgate apps in early September 2023.

== Company structure ==
Medgate is headquartered in Allschwil and is a majority-owned subsidiary of the German Otto Group. The parent entity of the group is Medgate Holding AG; its principal Swiss operating company is Medgate AG. Andy Fischer, co-founder of the company, is its chief executive officer.

The Medgate Group had a revenue of €42 million and 650 employees in 2022/23. It is active in Switzerland, Germany and the Philippines.

According to Neue Zürcher Zeitung reporting in 2024, Medgate operates the largest medical call centre in Switzerland and approximately half of Swiss health insurers use Medgate's services.

== Products ==
In Switzerland, Medgate is one of two providers in the "Telmed" segment of basic compulsory health insurance, in which policy-holders agree to contact a telemedicine service before consulting a physician or hospital in non-emergency cases.

Medgate primarily offers telemedicine consultations by physicians. The company's doctors may issue prescriptions, referrals or sick-leave certificates. Furthermore, it covers emergency hotlines for hospitals. Since 2024, Medgate has been cooperating with pharmacies, where pharmacy staff can arrange a telephone callback by a Medgate physician for customers seeking advice or a prescription. In Switzerland, some home care providers can access Medgate's telemedicine services in patients' homes out of hours as part of a pilot project. The company also offers a hotline for medical emergencies regarding children. In Germany, Medgate offers consultation services for family planning and infertility.
