= Château de la famille d'Eplingen =

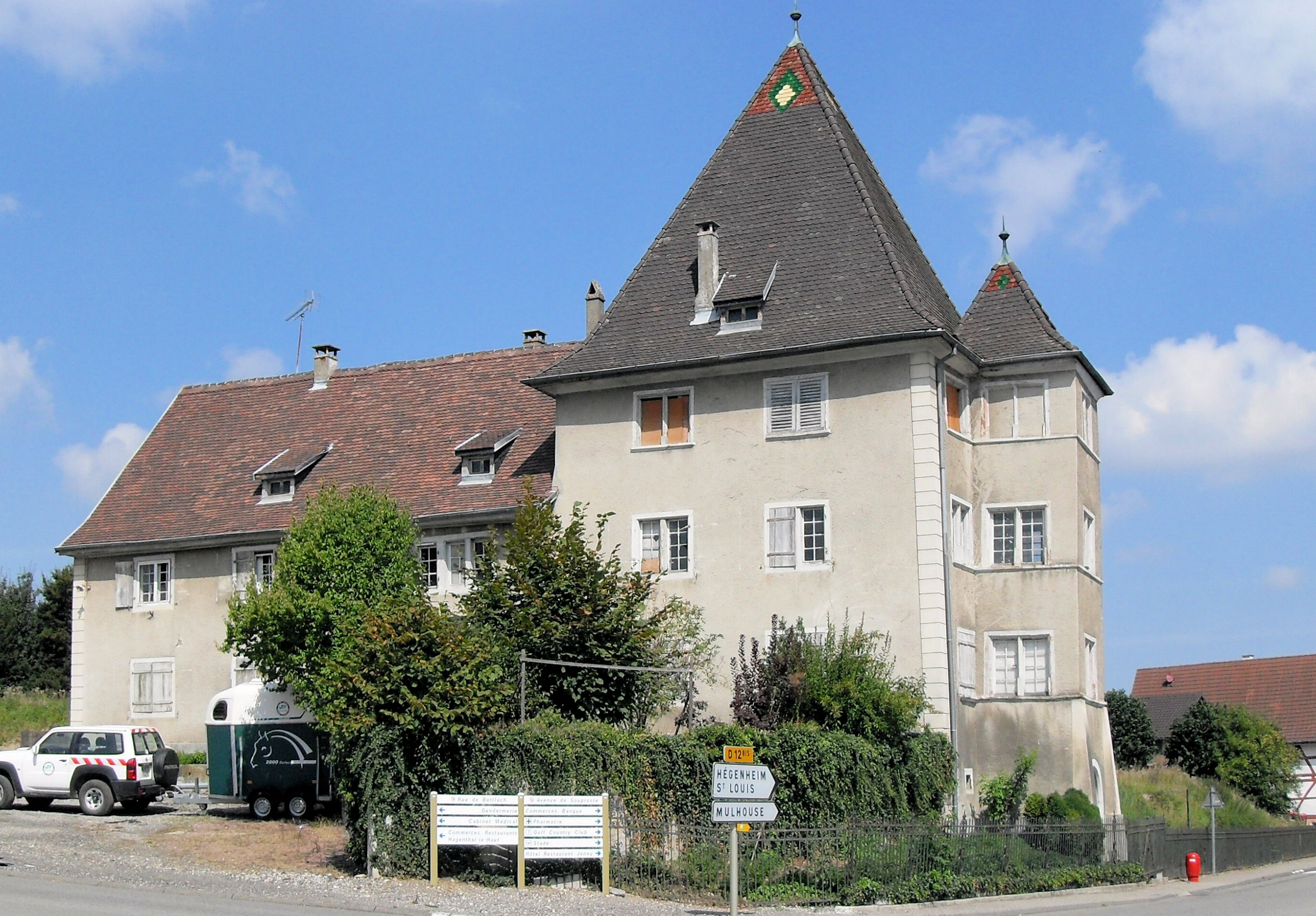

- Location within France

General information
- Status: In public ownership
- Type: Château
- Architectural style: French Renaissance
- Classification: Historical monument
- Location: Hagenthal-le-Bas, Haut-Rhin, Alsace, 2 rue de Bettlach, France
- Coordinates: 47.524°N 7.4767°E

Château de la famille d'Eplingen is a château in the commune of Hagenthal-le-Bas, in the department of Haut-Rhin, Alsace, France. Built in either the 16th or 17th century, the château became a national property in 1799 and remained so until it moved into private hands in the 1840s. The remodeling performed by its new owners were mostly to the external structure of the building. It has been owned by the town since 2003 and listed as a historical monument since 2010.
