= Allschwil =

- Municipality
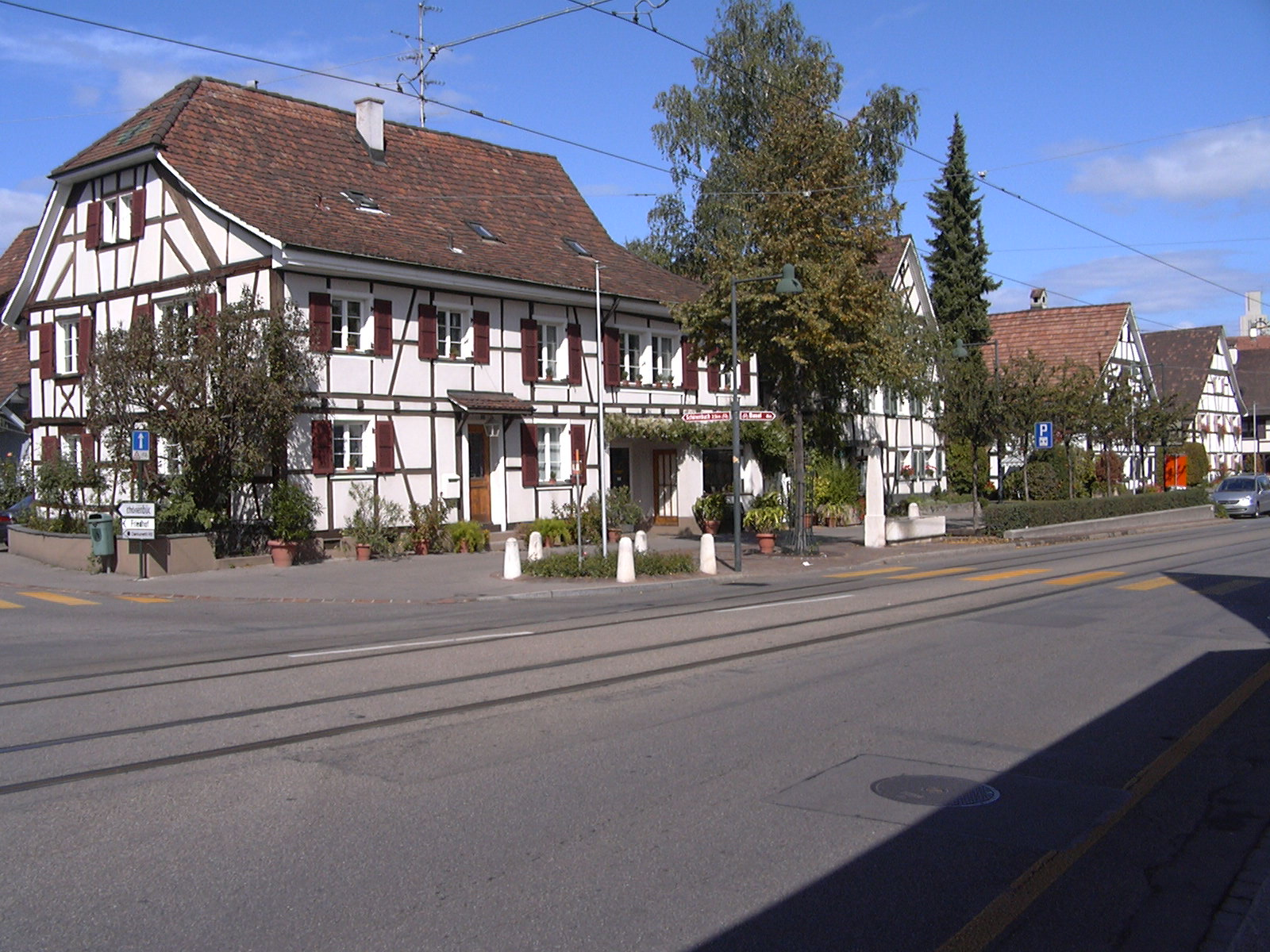
- Allschwil village

- Coat of arms
- Location of Allschwil
- Location within Switzerland Location within Canton of Basel-Landschaft
- Coordinates: 47°33′N 7°32′E
- Country: Switzerland
- Canton: Basel-Landschaft
- District: Arlesheim

Government
  - Executive: Gemeinderat with 7 members
  - Mayor: Gemeindepräsident/in; Nicole Nüssli-Kaiser FDP/PRD
  - Parliament: Einwohnerrat with 40 members

Area
  - Total: 8.89 km^{2} (3.43 sq mi)
- Elevation (Dorfplatz): 285 m (935 ft)

Population (June 2021)
  - Total: 21,563
  - Density: 2,430/km^{2} (6,280/sq mi)
- Demonym: German: Allschwiler(in)
- Time zone: UTC+01:00 (CET)
  - Summer (DST): UTC+02:00 (CEST)
- Postal code: 4123
- SFOS number: 2762
- ISO 3166 code: CH-BL
- Localities: Neuallschwil
- Surrounded by: Baselland (BL), Binningen, Buschwiller (FR-68), Hégenheim (FR-68), Neuwiller (FR-68), Oberwil, Saint-Louis (FR-68), Schönenbuch
- Twin towns: Pfullendorf (Germany), Blaj (Romania)
- Website: www.allschwil.ch

Allschwil (German pronunciation: [ˈalʃvi:l]; High Alemannic: Allschwyl) is a village and a municipality in the district of Arlesheim in the canton of Basel-Country in Switzerland.

Allschwil is a seamless suburb of Basel and is located between Basel to the east and Alsace in France to the west.

== History ==
The modern municipality of Allschwil is first mentioned in 1118 as Almswilre.

=== Prehistoric Allschwil ===
The region around Allschwil has been occupied since at least the Middle Paleolithic. Archeological finds from the municipality include a few scattered Middle Paleolithic items, cups from the Glockenbecherkultur (c. 2400–1800 BC), a mid-Bronze Age hoard (presumably a metal depot) and a Hallstatt culture settlement at in den Vogelgärten. In 1937, at New-Allschwil, a Gallo-Roman cremation cemetery (from c. AD 25–60) was discovered. It is one of the oldest in northern Switzerland. It is possible that the Roman road station Arialbinum (mentioned in "Antonine Itinerary" and "Tabula Peutingeriana") may correspond to Allschwil.

=== Medieval town ===
Allschwil was part of the Herrschaft of Birseck, which was given in 1004 as an imperial donation to the Bishop of Basel. Through the middle of the 15th century the Herrschaft was often pawned and sold. The town of Allschwil was located along the Alsace-Solothurn via Passwang pass trading route along the border. Its location on the border and trade route allowed Allschwil to grow into an important customs facility. After 1724 it housed the northern salt warehouse of the vogtei of the diocese of Basel. Allschwil was one of the seven so-called free villages (Vagantes extra civitate Basiliensem) and was therefore under the parish of St. John's Chapel at Basel's cathedral for baptism and high church festivals.

In the wake of the German Peasants' War Allschwil, together with Reinach, Therwil, Oberwil and Ettingen, joined Basel in 1525 with a Burgrecht agreement. This agreement was dissolved in 1585 in the Baden Agreement. In 1529 the village embraced the Protestant Reformation and converted to the new faith. Nearly a hundred years later, in 1627, the Bishop of Basel succeeded in spreading the Counter-Reformation to Allschwil. After 1567 there was a Jewish settlement in Allschwil. In 1692 there were 24 Jewish families living in the Judengässlein (from German: Little Jewish Alley) and they made up about 15% of the population. They had their own cemetery in Zwingen and a funeral right in Hegenheim. Children of Jews and Christians attended the 17th-century school together. Accusations of horse theft and Jewish plans to build a synagogue in Allschwil led to an expulsion decree in 1694 from the Bishop. Many of the Jews fled to Hegenheim.

The village Church of St. Peter and Paul was built in the 12th century and was under the patronage of the Basel cathedral. The lower part of the church tower is from the 12th/13th century, but the rest of the church was totally rebuilt in 1698–99. The parish of Allschwil also included Schönbuch, Hésingue (now in France) and until 1611, Hégenheim (also in France).

=== Early Modern Allschwil ===
After the short-lived Rauracian Republic (1792–93), the village was under French rule from 1793 to 1814. Between 1793 and 1800 it was part of the Département of Mont-Terrible and then in 1800-1814 it was part of the Département of Haut-Rhin. Unlike most of the villages in the Birseck region, Allschwil reacted negatively to French rule, and even had a small rebellion in 1794.

In 1815 Allschwil became part of the Canton of Basel and when the canton split in 1833, it became part of the new canton of Basel-Country. The split between Basel-City and Basel-Country led to shift in religious power in Allschwil. In 1877, the Roman Catholic Reverend Peter Wildman was voted out by the parishioners and was replaced by Johannes Schmid a Christian Catholic priest. The village church then became Christian Catholic. In 1878 the Swiss Reformed Church founded a parish in Allschwil. By 1970 about 54% of the inhabitants were Swiss Reformed, while 40% were Roman Catholic.

=== Modern Allschwil ===
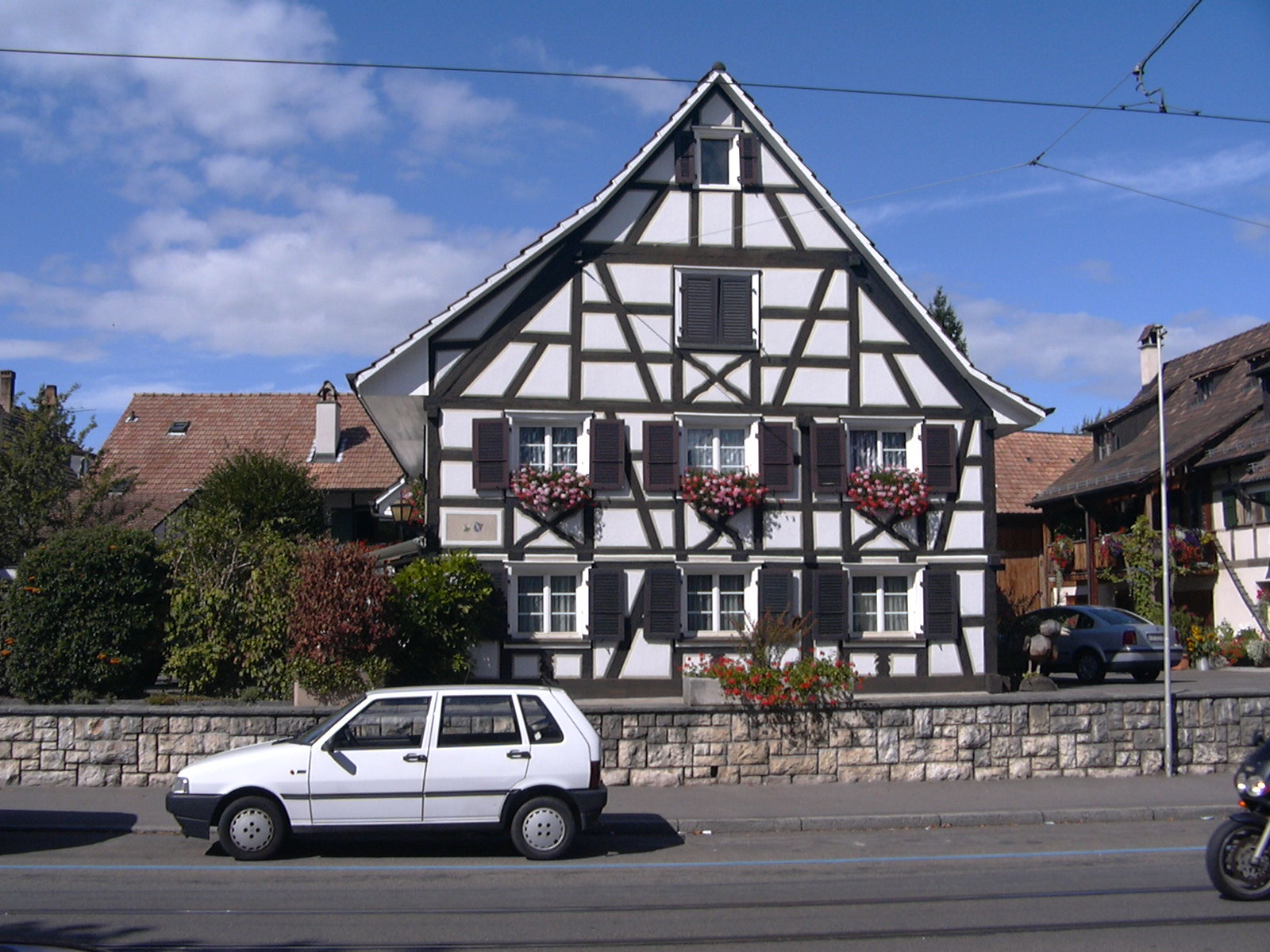
Half Timbered house in the village center

By 1860 the agricultural village of Allschwil was converting into an industrial town. Many of the inhabitants were working in factories in Basel. The farmers were mostly growing grain and vegetables, which they supplied to the nearby market of Basel. Allschwil was especially known for its white cabbage. Between 1897 and 1921, the cabbage was processed in a sauerkraut factory, which was built by the village agricultural collective. By the end of the 19th century hemp, flax and vineyards had all disappeared from the village. In 1955 there were 63 farms, while in 1965 it was down to 29, and in 1980 the number of farms had only slightly increased to 31. Until 1930 the industrial sector grew strongly in Allschwil (mainly brick, along with clothing, metal and machinery industry) and in 1910 about 73% of workers worked in industry. In the 1870s several brick factories opened in Allschwil, including Passavant-Iselin & Co. a company that had the first interlocking tile press in Switzerland. Passavant-Iselin & Co. remained in operation until they closed in 1975. The lack of railway connection (the 1926 proposed rail freight terminal was never realized) prevented a greater industrial development. In addition, with the rise of Rhine shipping, Allschwil lost its importance as customs station. A tram line to Basel opened in 1905. By 1910 about 40% of the working population commuted out of Allschwil for work, by 1990 this had increased to 79%. Today, Allschwil is focused on light industry including industrial metals, paper industry and chemistry. In 1990, 35% of workers were in the industrial sector and 54% were in the services sector.

Allschwil experienced a massive population growth between 1850 and 1970 thanks to immigration from Basel. In 1930 it was the most populous municipality outside Basel, and suffered typical infrastructure problems. Since 1970, the growth has stagnated. The center of the town has retained its village-like appearance. This is reinforced by the restoration of the mid-19th-century half timbered houses, which were given an award in 1976 from the Council of Europe, and another in 1980 for their village center planning. A town history museum opened in 1968 and in 1977 the Allschwiler market was established.

== Geography ==
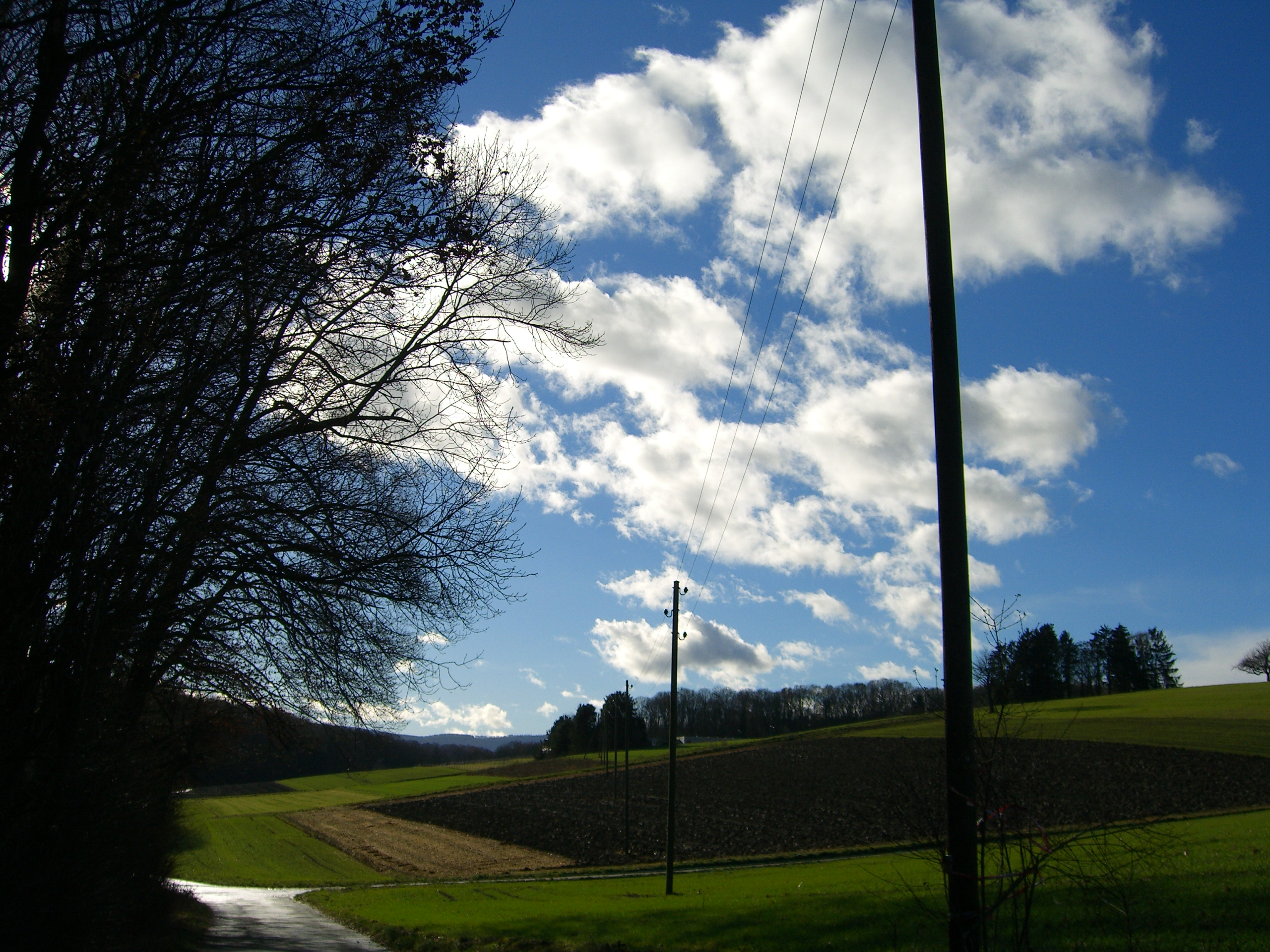
Countryside outside Allschwil

Aerial view by Walter Mittelholzer (1925)

Allschwil has an area, as of 2009, of 8.92 square kilometers (3.44 sq mi). Of this area, 2.62 km^{2} (1.01 sq mi) or 29.4% is used for agricultural purposes, while 2.41 km^{2} (0.93 sq mi) or 27.0% is forested. Of the rest of the land, 3.84 km^{2} (1.48 sq mi) or 43.0% is settled (buildings or roads), 0.02 km^{2} (4.9 acres) or 0.2% is either rivers or lakes and 0.03 km^{2} (7.4 acres) or 0.3% is unproductive land.

Of the built-up area, industrial buildings made up 4.9% of the total area while housing and buildings made up 20.6% and transportation infrastructure made up 8.1%. Power and water infrastructure as well as other special developed areas made up 2.2% of the area while parks, green belts and sports fields made up 7.2%. Out of the forested land, 25.8% of the total land area is heavily forested and 1.2% is covered with orchards or small clusters of trees. Of the agricultural land, 19.8% is used for growing crops and 6.3% is pastures, while 3.3% is used for orchards or vine crops. All the water in the municipality is flowing water.

The municipality is located in the Arlesheim district, on the edge of the Sundgauer Hill Country along the Upper Rhine valley.

Allschwil is a suburb of Basel on the west and has the border with France on two sides. The neighboring municipalities in Switzerland are, besides Basel, Schönenbuch, Oberwil, and Binningen, and the French communes of Neuwiller, Buschwiller, Hégenheim, and Saint-Louis.

The landscape is typical of the Rhine valley, where the Rhine turns from flowing west through hilly country where it forms the border between Switzerland and Germany to the wide plain where it flows north and forms the border between France and Germany.

== Coat of arms ==
The blazon of the municipal coat of arms is Azure, a Sword Argent and a Key Or in saltire.

== Demographics ==
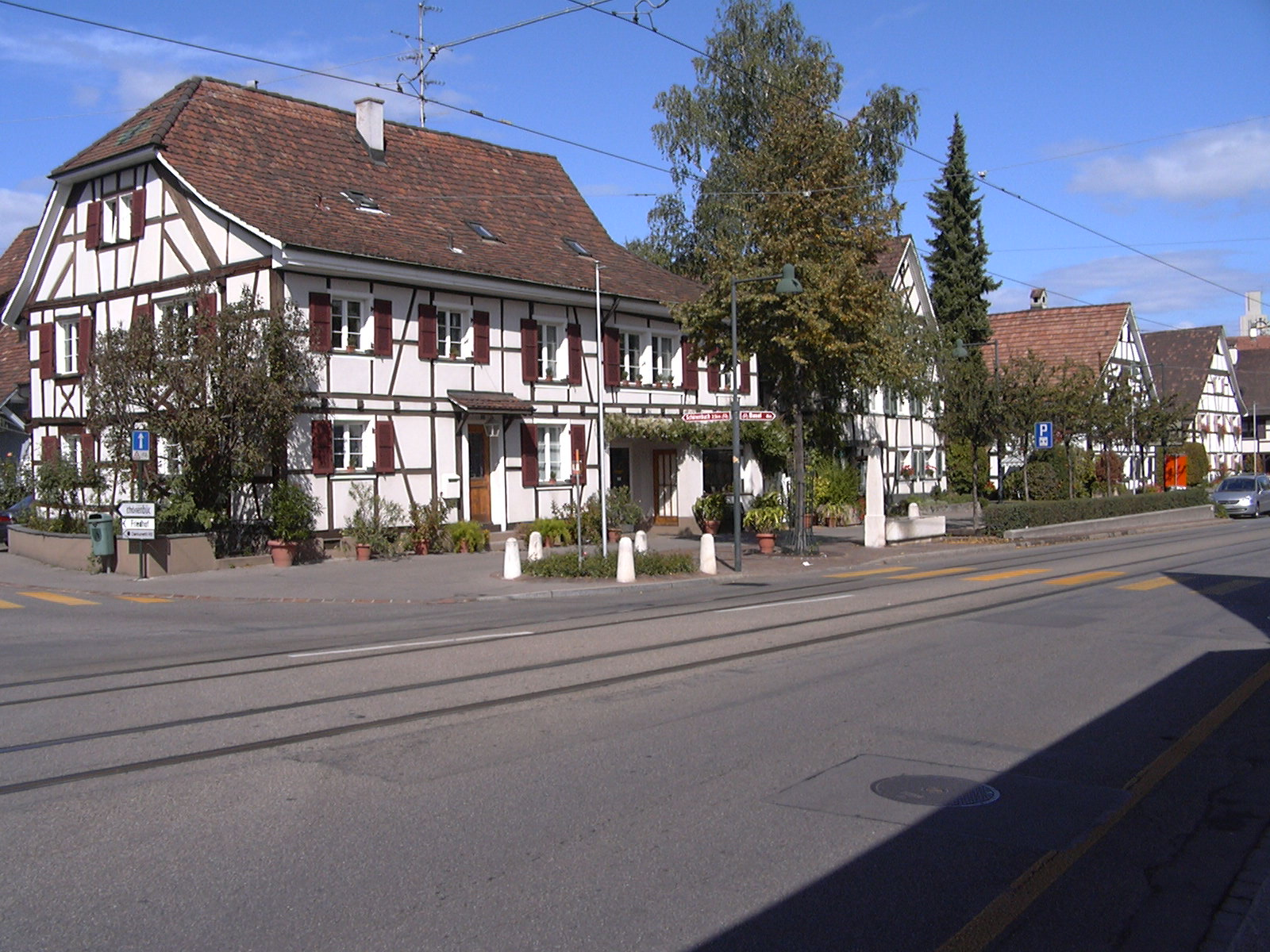
Restored Half Timbered houses in the center of Allschwil

Allschwil has a population (as of June 2021) of 21,563. As of 2008, 20.0% of the population are foreign nationals. Over the last 10 years (1997–2007) the population has changed at a rate of -0.2%.

Most of the population (as of 2000) speaks German (15,689 or 86.5%), with Italian language being second most common (580 or 3.2%) and French being third (433 or 2.4%). There are 16 people who speak Romansh.

As of 2008, the gender distribution of the population was 47.8% male and 52.2% female. The population was made up of 15,144 Swiss citizens (78.8% of the population), and 4,079 non-Swiss residents (21.2%) Of the population in the municipality 4,073 or about 22.5% were born in Allschwil and lived there in 2000. There were 1,486 or 8.2% who were born in the same canton, while 7,928 or 43.7% were born somewhere else in Switzerland, and 3,946 or 21.8% were born outside of Switzerland.

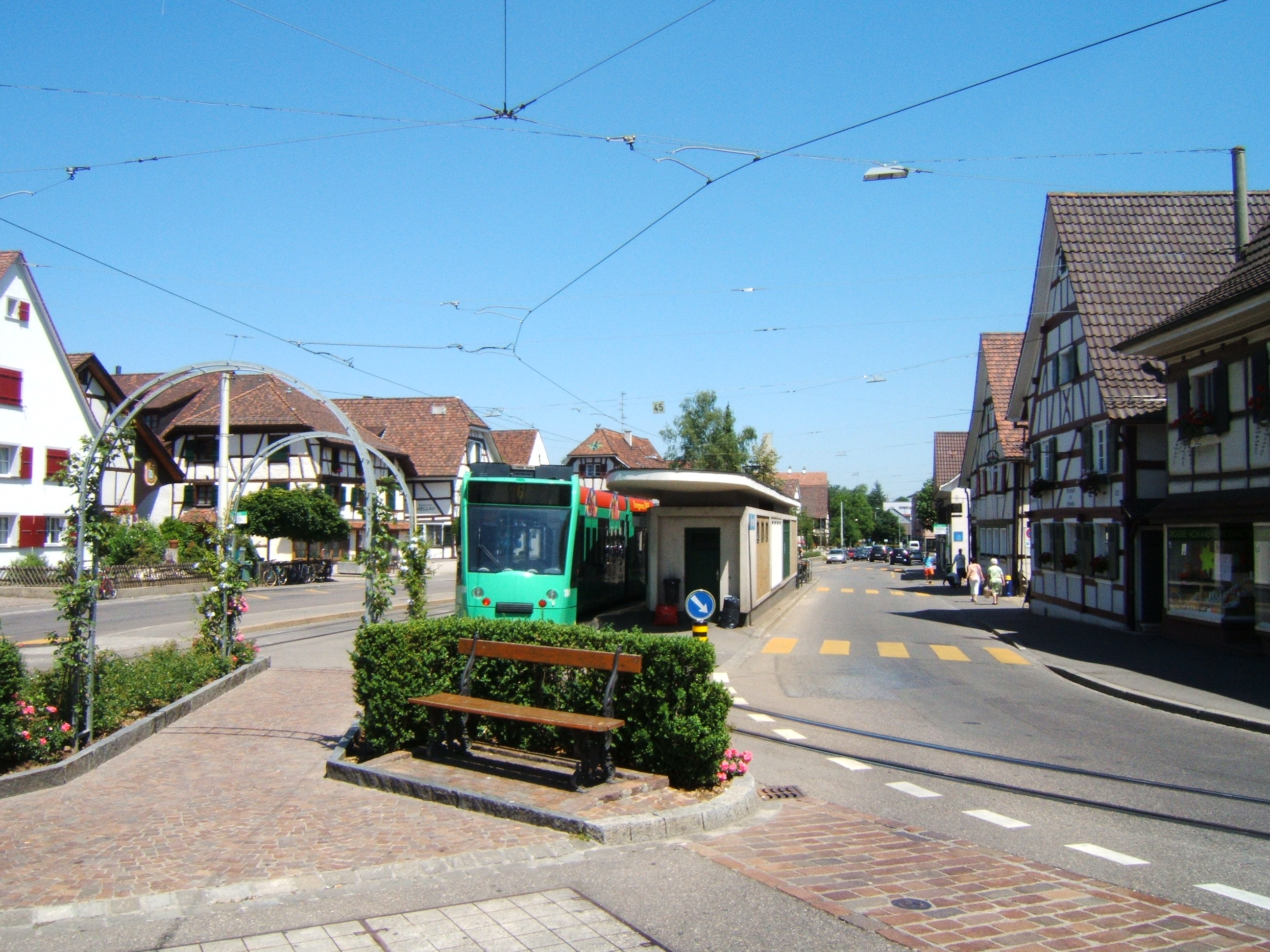
Tram in Allschwil

In 2008 there were 114 live births to Swiss citizens and 46 births to non-Swiss citizens, and in same time span there were 169 deaths of Swiss citizens and 8 non-Swiss citizen deaths. Ignoring immigration and emigration, the population of Swiss citizens decreased by 55 while the foreign population increased by 38. There was 1 Swiss man and 7 Swiss women who emigrated from Switzerland. At the same time, there were 108 non-Swiss men and 99 non-Swiss women who immigrated from another country to Switzerland. The total Swiss population change in 2008 (from all sources, including moves across municipal borders) was an increase of 99 and the non-Swiss population change was an increase of 256 people. This represents a population growth rate of 1.9%.

The age distribution, as of 2010, in Allschwil is; 1,203 children or 6.3% of the population are between 0 and 6 years old and 2,134 teenagers or 11.1% are between 7 and 19. Of the adult population, 2,192 people or 11.4% of the population are between 20 and 29 years old. 2,629 people or 13.7% are between 30 and 39, 3,029 people or 15.8% are between 40 and 49, and 3,851 people or 20.0% are between 50 and 64. The senior population distribution is 3,051 people or 15.9% of the population are between 65 and 79 years old and there are 1,134 people or 5.9% who are over 80.

As of 2000, there were 6,616 people who were single and never married in the municipality. There were 9,099 married individuals, 1,169 widows or widowers and 1,247 individuals who are divorced.

As of 2000, there were 8,751 private households in the municipality, and an average of 2. persons per household. There were 3,440 households that consist of only one person and 256 households with five or more people. Out of a total of 8,895 households that answered this question, 38.7% were households made up of just one person and 59 were adults who lived with their parents. Of the rest of the households, there are 2,808 married couples without children, 1,869 married couples with children There were 466 single parents with a child or children. There were 109 households that were made up unrelated people and 144 households that were made some sort of institution or another collective housing.

In 2000 there were 1,756 single family homes (or 56.1% of the total) out of a total of 3,131 inhabited buildings. There were 909 multi-family buildings (29.0%), along with 346 multi-purpose buildings that were mostly used for housing (11.1%) and 120 other use buildings (commercial or industrial) that also had some housing (3.8%). Of the single family homes 152 were built before 1919, while 108 were built between 1990 and 2000. The greatest number of single family homes (498) were built between 1919 and 1945.

In 2000 there were 9,207 apartments in the municipality. The most common apartment size was 3 rooms of which there were 3,495. There were 421 single room apartments and 1,811 apartments with five or more rooms. Of these apartments, a total of 8,537 apartments (92.7% of the total) were permanently occupied, while 487 apartments (5.3%) were seasonally occupied and 183 apartments (2.0%) were empty. As of 2007, the construction rate of new housing units was 8.1 new units per 1000 residents. As of 2000 the average price to rent a two-room apartment was about 847.00 CHF (US$680, £380, €540), a three-room apartment was about 1101.00 CHF (US$880, £500, €700) and a four-room apartment cost an average of 1334.00 CHF (US$1070, £600, €850). The vacancy rate for the municipality, in 2008, was 0.57%.

The historical population is given in the following chart:

== Sights ==
The entire village of Allschwil is designated as part of the Inventory of Swiss Heritage Sites.

== Politics ==
In the 2007 federal election the most popular party was the SP which received 28.1% of the vote. The next three most popular parties were the SVP (27.57%), the FDP (15.07%) and the Green Party (12.66%). In the federal election, a total of 6,186 votes were cast, and the voter turnout was 47.4%.

== Economy ==
Allschwil is home to numerous companies in the chemical, pharmaceutical and biotechnology industries. These include Actelion, Abbott, Spexis, MDL Information Systems and Idorsia Pharmaceuticals. As of 2007, Allschwil had an unemployment rate of 2.36%. As of 2005, there were 112 people employed in the primary economic sector and about 19 businesses involved in this sector. 2,647 people were employed in the secondary sector and there were 189 businesses in this sector. 5,190 people were employed in the tertiary sector, with 609 businesses in this sector. There were 9,313 residents of the municipality who were employed in some capacity, of which females made up 45.6% of the workforce.

In 2008 the total number of full-time equivalent jobs was 7,613. The number of jobs in the primary sector was 33, of which 26 were in agriculture and 7 were in forestry or lumber production. The number of jobs in the secondary sector was 2,605, of which 1,828 or (70.2%) were in manufacturing and 710 (27.3%) were in construction. The number of jobs in the tertiary sector was 4,975. In the tertiary sector; 1,391 or 28.0% were in wholesale or retail sales or the repair of motor vehicles, 95 or 1.9% were in the movement and storage of goods, 217 or 4.4% were in a hotel or restaurant, 196 or 3.9% were in the information industry, 71 or 1.4% were the insurance or financial industry, 1,376 or 27.7% were technical professionals or scientists, 192 or 3.9% were in education and 632 or 12.7% were in health care.

In 2000, there were 8,037 workers who commuted into the municipality and 7,055 workers who commuted away. The municipality is a net importer of workers, with about 1.1 workers entering the municipality for every one leaving. About 25.4% of the workforce coming into Allschwil are coming from outside Switzerland, while 0.3% of the locals commute out of Switzerland for work. Of the working population, 36.2% used public transportation to get to work, and 29.8% used a private car.

Allschwil is now largely a residential bedroom community for the city of Basel, with some light industry, notably in electronics, chemicals, pharmaceuticals, and biotech. It is a highly prized residential district because of its proximity to the city combined with a more rural atmosphere and open spaces.

It is also attractive because of its lower taxes.

== Religion ==
From the 2000 census, 6,386 or 35.2% were Roman Catholic, while 5,945 or 32.8% belonged to the Swiss Reformed Church. Of the rest of the population, there were 190 members of an Orthodox church (or about 1.05% of the population), there were 250 individuals (or about 1.38% of the population) who belonged to the Christian Catholic Church, and there were 416 individuals (or about 2.29% of the population) who belonged to another Christian church. There were 56 individuals (or about 0.31% of the population) who were Jewish, and 464 (or about 2.56% of the population) who were Islamic. There were 56 individuals who were Buddhist, 114 individuals who were Hindu and 26 individuals who belonged to another church. 3,560 (or about 19.63% of the population) belonged to no church, are agnostic or atheist, and 668 individuals (or about 3.68% of the population) did not answer the question.

== Education ==
In Allschwil about 7,897 or (43.6%) of the population have completed non-mandatory upper secondary education, and 2,846 or (15.7%) have completed additional higher education (either university or a Fachhochschule). Of the 2,846 who completed tertiary schooling, 56.5% were Swiss men, 25.9% were Swiss women, 10.4% were non-Swiss men and 7.2% were non-Swiss women. As of 2000, there were 116 students in Allschwil who came from another municipality, while 650 residents attended schools outside the municipality.

== Public transport ==
Allschwil is currently served by the following BVB and BLT Lines:

Tram 6: Allschwil-Basel-Riehen

Tram 8: Kleinhüningen - Neuweilerstrasse (Although the Number 8 Tram terminates at Neuweilerstrasse in Basel, the border with Allschwil is less than 50 metres away from this stop.)

Bus 31: Allschwil-Schifflände-Habermatten

Bus 33: Schönenbuch-Allschwil-Schifflände

Bus 38: Allschwil-Schifflände-Grenzach Wyhlen (Germany)

Bus 48: Bachgraben-Ziegelei-Wanderstrasse-Bahnhof SBB (railway station)

Bus 61: Letten-Binningen-Oberwil

Bus 64: Bachgraben-Ziegelei-Oberwil-Therwil-Reinach-Arlesheim Dorf

There are also some proposals to build a railway station on the SNCF Line from Basel to Mulhouse at Morgartenring (Basel). Even though the station would be located in Basel, it would serve Allschwil as well because it would be located only a couple of hundred meters away from the City Border.

== Notable people ==
- Alfred Jäck (1911 in Allschwil – 1953), footballer who played 28 games for Switzerland
- Ricco (1915 in Allschwil – 1972), born as Erich Wassmer, a Swiss painter of magic realism
- Jürg Marmet (1927 – 2013 in Allschwil), mountaineer, part of the first two-man Swiss team to climb Mount Everest in 1956
- Heidi Baader-Nobs (born 1940), composer, lived in Allschwil
- Harry Schaffer (born 1963), artist and interior architect, brought up in Allschwil
- Giuseppe Morello (born 1985 in Allschwil), Swiss-Italian footballer
