= Buschwiller =

Commune in Grand Est, France

- Commune
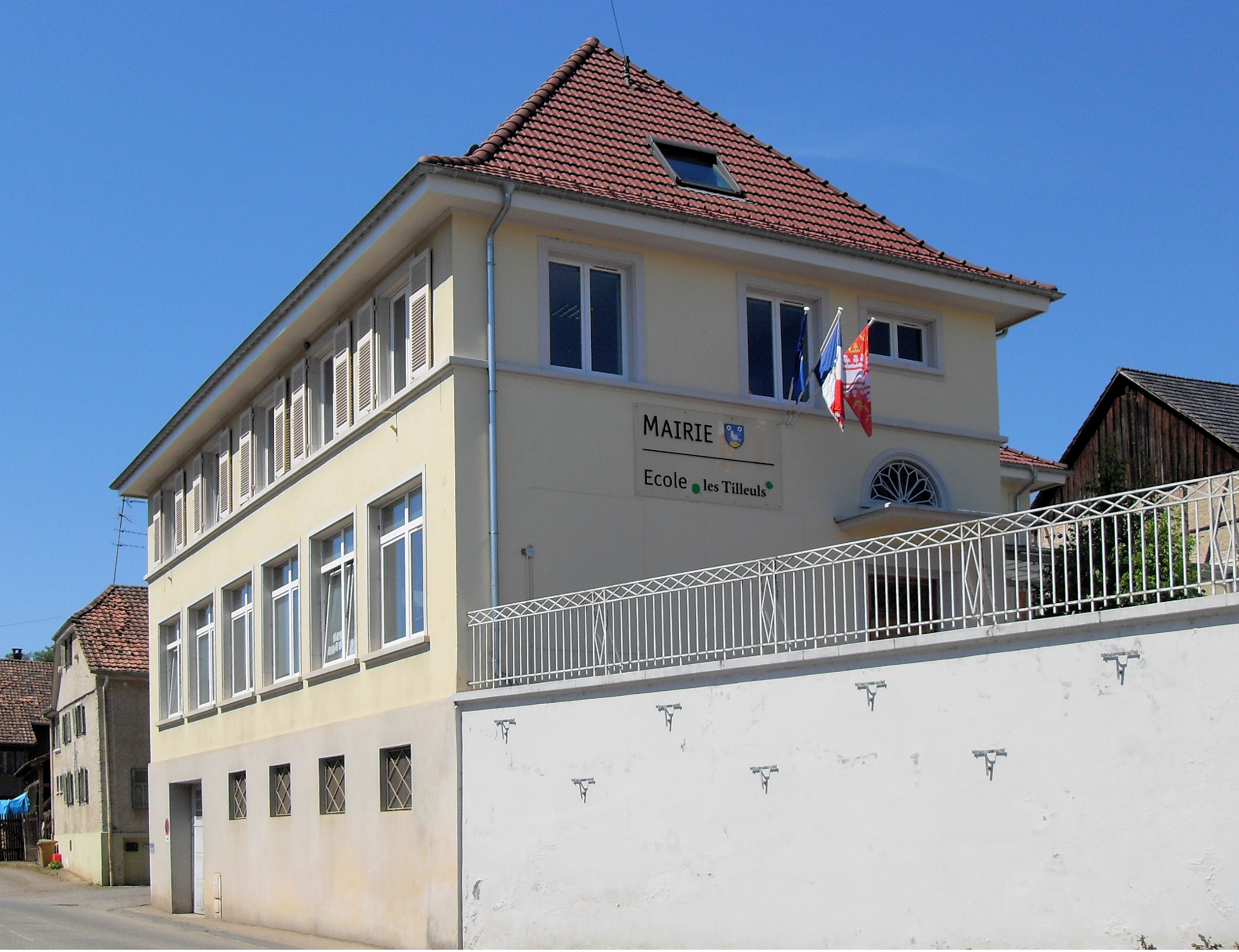
- The town hall and school in Buschwiller

- Coat of arms
- Location of Buschwiller
- Location within France Location within Grand Est
- Coordinates: 47°33′33″N 7°30′29″E
- Country: France
- Region: Grand Est
- Department: Haut-Rhin
- Arrondissement: Mulhouse
- Canton: Saint-Louis
- Intercommunality: Saint-Louis Agglomération

Government
  - Mayor (2020–2026): Christèle Willer
- Area^{1}: 4.16 km^{2} (1.61 sq mi)
- Elevation: 315 m (1,033 ft)
- Highest elevation: 372 m (1,220 ft)
- Lowest elevation: 282 m (925 ft)
- Population (2023): 1,047
  - Density: 252/km^{2} (652/sq mi)
- Time zone: UTC+01:00 (CET)
  - Summer (DST): UTC+02:00 (CEST)
- INSEE/Postal code: 68061 /68220
- ^{1} French Land Register data, which excludes lakes, ponds, glaciers > 1 km^{2} (0.386 sq mi or 247 acres) and river estuaries.

Buschwiller (German: Buschweiler) is a commune in the Haut-Rhin department in Alsace in north-eastern France.

== See also ==
- Communes of the Haut-Rhin department

== Geography and climate ==
=== Geography ===
Buschwiller is a village located in the French part of the agglomeration of Basel. It is adjacent to the Swiss town of Schönenbuch.

=== Climate ===
Due to its position, in the far north-east of France, Buschwiller features a semi-continental climate (Köppen : Cfb), characterized by warm to hot, humid summers and cool to cold, drier winters. It usually snows every year, but without substantial accumulation.

Climate data for Basle (Binningen), elevation: 316 m (1,037 ft), 1991–2020 normals, extremes 1901–present
Month	Jan	Feb	Mar	Apr	May	Jun	Jul	Aug	Sep	Oct	Nov	Dec	Year
Record high °C (°F)	19.0 (66.2)	22.0 (71.6)	25.2 (77.4)	30.5 (86.9)	33.5 (92.3)	38.4 (101.1)	39.0 (102.2)	38.7 (101.7)	35.0 (95.0)	29.6 (85.3)	21.9 (71.4)	20.6 (69.1)	39.0 (102.2)
Mean daily maximum °C (°F)	5.0 (41.0)	8.0 (46.4)	12.0 (53.6)	16.0 (60.8)	20.0 (68.0)	24.0 (75.2)	26.0 (78.8)	25.0 (77.0)	21.0 (69.8)	16.0 (60.8)	9.0 (48.2)	6.0 (42.8)	15.7 (60.3)
Daily mean °C (°F)	3.0 (37.4)	4.5 (40.1)	7.5 (45.5)	11.0 (51.8)	15.0 (59.0)	18.5 (65.3)	20.5 (68.9)	20.0 (68.0)	16.5 (61.7)	12.0 (53.6)	6.0 (42.8)	3.5 (38.3)	12.5 (54.5)
Mean daily minimum °C (°F)	1.0 (33.8)	1.0 (33.8)	3.0 (37.4)	6.0 (42.8)	10.0 (50.0)	13.0 (55.4)	15.0 (59.0)	15.0 (59.0)	12.0 (53.6)	8.0 (46.4)	3.0 (37.4)	1.0 (33.8)	7.5 (45.5)
Record low °C (°F)	−24.2 (−11.6)	−23.8 (−10.8)	−14.8 (5.4)	−6.3 (20.7)	−2.7 (27.1)	1.1 (34.0)	5.1 (41.2)	3.6 (38.5)	−1.3 (29.7)	−5.5 (22.1)	−11.0 (12.2)	−20.9 (−5.6)	−24.2 (−11.6)
Average precipitation mm (inches)	47.8 (1.88)	45.2 (1.78)	49.5 (1.95)	63.5 (2.50)	97.6 (3.84)	86.6 (3.41)	88.9 (3.50)	88.3 (3.48)	70.2 (2.76)	74.4 (2.93)	64.9 (2.56)	65.0 (2.56)	842.0 (33.15)
Average snowfall cm (inches)	7.2 (2.8)	7.2 (2.8)	4.4 (1.7)	0.6 (0.2)	0.0 (0.0)	0.0 (0.0)	0.0 (0.0)	0.0 (0.0)	0.0 (0.0)	0.1 (0.0)	2.0 (0.8)	7.6 (3.0)	29.0 (11.4)
Average precipitation days (≥ 1.0 mm)	9.1	8.4	8.9	9.3	11.7	10.6	10.1	10.2	8.5	10.4	10.0	11.0	118.0
Average snowy days (≥ 1.0 cm)	2.8	2.1	1.1	0.2	0.0	0.0	0.0	0.0	0.0	0.1	0.7	2.3	9.3
Average relative humidity (%)	81	76	69	67	71	70	68	71	77	82	83	82	75
Mean monthly sunshine hours	64.5	85.2	134.6	167.4	185.6	211.9	234.9	216.5	160.1	107.0	65.4	54.2	1,687
Percentage possible sunshine	28	34	40	45	44	48	54	55	48	36	28	27	41
Source 1: NOAA
Source 2: MeteoSwissKNMI

.
