= Jacques Wildberger =

Swiss composer

Jacques Wildberger (3 January 1922 – 23 August 2006) was a Swiss composer.

== Life and career ==
Born in Basel, Wildberger became a member of the Swiss Party of Labour (PdA) in 1944 and composed battle songs for the Basel workers' cabaret Scheinwerfer and the Neue Volksbühne Basel; in 1947 he left the PdA as a reaction to Stalin's politics.

After first studies at the Basel Conservatory he studied from 1948 to 1952 with Wladimir Rudolfowitsch Vogel in Ascona, in particular the twelve-tone technique (dodecaphony).

Initially criticized for his dodecaphonic works in Switzerland, he later caused a sensation abroad as the successor to Arnold Schönberg with his twelve-tone compositions. From 1959 to 1966 he taught musical composition, music analysis and instrumentation at the Hochschule für Musik Karlsruhe. After a stay in Berlin as a scholarship holder of the German Academic Exchange Service in 1967, he was professor for music theory and composition at the conservatory of the City of Basel Music Academy from 1967 to 1987.

He died in Riehen at age 84.
