= Hagenthal-le-Bas =

Commune in Grand Est, France

- Commune
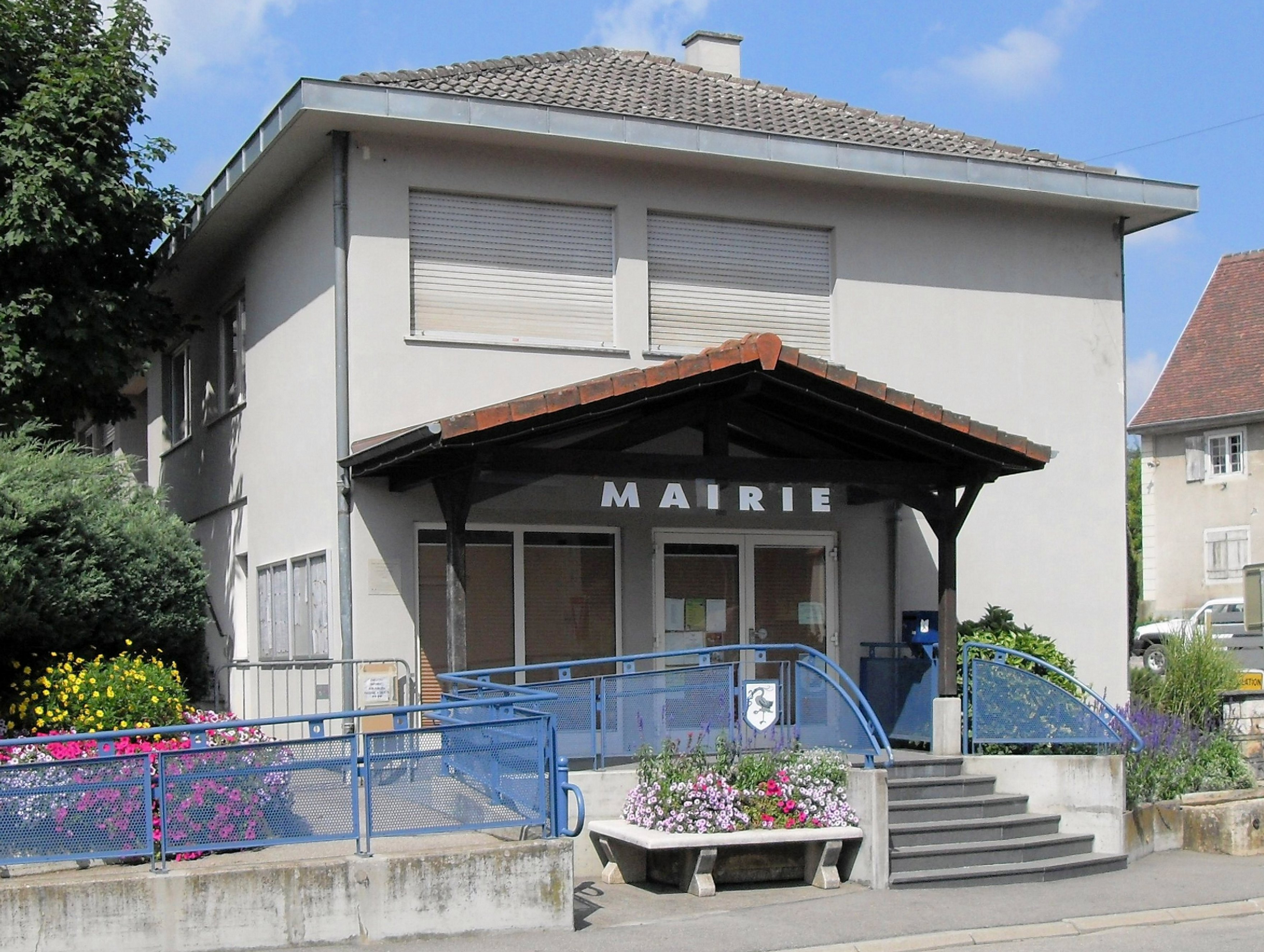
- The town hall in Hagenthal-le-Bas

- Coat of arms
- Location of Hagenthal-le-Bas
- Location within France Location within Grand Est
- Coordinates: 47°31′32″N 7°28′41″E
- Country: France
- Region: Grand Est
- Department: Haut-Rhin
- Arrondissement: Mulhouse
- Canton: Saint-Louis
- Intercommunality: Saint-Louis Agglomération

Government
  - Mayor (2020–2026): Gilbert Fuchs
- Area^{1}: 6.2 km^{2} (2.4 sq mi)
- Elevation: 360 m (1,180 ft)
- Highest elevation: 481 m (1,578 ft)
- Lowest elevation: 319 m (1,047 ft)
- Population (2023): 1,418
  - Density: 230/km^{2} (590/sq mi)
- Time zone: UTC+01:00 (CET)
  - Summer (DST): UTC+02:00 (CEST)
- INSEE/Postal code: 68120 /68220
- ^{1} French Land Register data, which excludes lakes, ponds, glaciers > 1 km^{2} (0.386 sq mi or 247 acres) and river estuaries.

Hagenthal-le-Bas (French pronunciation: [agəntal lə ba]; German: Niederhagenthal) is a commune in the Haut-Rhin department in Alsace in north-eastern France. The Château de la famille d'Eplingen there has been owned by the town since 2003 and been a listed historical monument since 2010.

== See also ==
- Communes of the Haut-Rhin département
