= Harry G. Shaffer =

American economist

Harry G. Shaffer (1919–2009) was a professor in the Economics Department at the University of Kansas.

Shaffer was born on August 28, 1919, in Vienna, Austria. Fluent in German, Shaffer served with the US Army as a translator during World War II. He was active in the Civil Rights Movement and the movement against the War in Vietnam.

== Life ==
Harry G. Shaffer was born in Vienna, Austria, to Max Shaffer and Tosca Infeld. He left his native country at the age of 18 in 1938. He lived in Cuba for 2 years while his US immigration visa was pending. He then served the U.S. Army intelligence during World War II as a German translator. After the war, the G.I. Bill of Rights paid for four years of school at New York University. In those four years, he received both bachelor's and master's degrees in economics and even completed a course towards his doctorate. He then taught economics at Concord College in Athens, West Virginia, for a year and a half. Afterwards moved to the University of Alabama where he taught economics for 6 years.

In 1956, Autherine Lucy was the first black woman to be admitted to the university. About three thousand students protested this admittance. The University of Alabama expelled Lucy on charges of defamation after she claimed the university did not provide her adequate protection. Along with 28 other professors, Shaffer left the school as he felt he could no longer honorably be associated with the university. "And that's how KU got lucky enough to get me", Shaffer joked to about 500 students in his class at the beginning of every semester.

He wrote one popular book called American Capitalism and the Changing role of Government and about ten scholarly books, including The Soviet System in Theory and Practice: Western and Soviet Views, "The Soviet Economy: Western and Soviet Views," "From Underdevelopment to Affluence: Western, Soviet, and Chinese Views," "The Soviet Treatment of Jews," "Women in the Two Germanies: A Comparative Study of a Socialist and Non-Socialist Society," "Periodicals on the Socialist Countries and Marxism: A New Annotated Index of English Language Publications," "Soviet Agriculture: An Assessment of Its Contributions to Economic Development," and others. Harry Shaffer prided himself on being one of the few American scholars presenting a balanced view of capitalism and socialism by presenting voices from both sides of the table. He also wrote countless scholarly articles, and a popular piece on U.S. History titled "The U.S. Conquers the West." He used to say, semi-humorously, that his specialty, Soviet Economics, no longer existed. He taught at the University of Kansas for 53 years after leaving the University of Alabama. In the later part of his career, he taught ECON 104, which is the introduction to economics course. The course attracted about 500 students every semester.

Shaffer died on November 3, 2009.

Harry Shaffer had four children, two stepchildren (with Betty R. Rosenzweig, married in 1987), and seven grandchildren at the time of his death at Lawrence Memorial Hospital.

== Bibliography ==
- Harry G. Shaffer (1999). American Capitalism and the Changing Role of Government. ABC-CLIO. ISBN 978-0-275-96658-4.
- Harry G. Shaffer (2013) [1981]. Women in the Two Germanies: A Comparative Study of A Socialist and a Non-Socialist Society. Elsevier. ISBN 978-1-4831-5336-0.
- Harry George Shaffer; Jan S. Prybyla (1968). From Underdevelopment to Affluence: Western, Soviet, and Chinese Views. Appleton-Century-Crofts.
