= Harry Schaffer =

Swiss architect and sculptor

Harry Schaffer (born 1963 in Chur, Switzerland) is a Swiss artist and interior architect, who lives and works in Basel.

== Early life and education ==
Schaffer grew up in Allschwil and Olten, Switzerland.

He graduated in 1983 and attended thereafter Basel art school and served an apprenticeship as an interior draftsman.

After several study trips to the United States, he studied at the Academy of Arts of Basel, where he graduated with a Master of Design I Art & Innovation.

== Career ==
Schaffer today owns a studio for interior architecture and a planning company for sustainable projects in Basel.

Schaffer's art works are positioned within the themes of minimal art and land art.

For many years he has also been collaborating with the German-French artist Wolf Warnke.

His main topics are the circle and the square, to which he modulates and experiments in different sizes and materials in various places around the world.

His scale of works range from short interventions with natural materials to sculptures out of steel or granite. He examines strongly the environment and the proportion of the golden section, which appear regularly in his works.

== Personal life ==
Schaffer is a father of three daughters.

== Works ==
- Copper Circle. Roveredo (CH), 2018.
- Big Circle. Roveredo (CH), 2017.
- Barbed Circle. Venice (IT), 2017.
- Red Cube. Roveredo (CH), 2016.
- Pyromide. Jamel (DE), 2016.
- Man Circle. Roveredo (CH), 2016.
- Rustico Circle. Roveredo (CH), 2016.
- Desert Circle. Wonder Valley (USA), 2015.
- Floating Cube. Arlesheim (CH), 2015.
- Die Dekonstruktion der Perspektive. Reillane (F) 2015.
- Die Dekonstruktion des Nichts. Arlesheim (CH), 2015.
- from chaos to order. Arlesheim (CH), 2015.
- two circles. Arlesheim CH 2015
- Dehors. Olten (CH), 2012.
- OPO-LEGNO. LandArtinstallation. Opole (PL), 2012.
- Focus. Arlesheim (CH), 2015.
- Kunst auf der Alp. Laax (CH), 2011.
- Humus Park. Pordenone (IT), 2010.
- Le nid. Reillanne (F), 2004.
- 3 Cubes en Rouge coquelicot. Reillanne (F) 2002.
- Projekt Le pont de Wattwiller. Wattwiler (F), 2001.
- Sculpture for a porcellaine-company (CH), 1999.
- Steinstele. Lötschental (CH), 1999.
- Cinq colonnes. Reillanne (F), 1999.
- Baumzauber. Urban-artproject Basel (CH), 1998/1999.
- Mongolpierre. Reillanne (F), 1998.
- trou du Mistral. Reillanne (F), 1997.
- 3 Sisters. Arlesheim (CH), 1995.

== Literature and publications ==
- PERSONAL STRUCTURES Open Borders, Palazzo Mora. Palazzo Bembo Giardini Marinaressa, ISBN 978-90-826559-1-9
- Chris van Uffelen: 500 X ART IN PUBLIC. Edit: Braun. 2011, ISBN 978-3-03768-098-8.

== Exhibitions ==
- 2017: Barbed Circle, in Venedig (IT)
- 2016: PYROMIDE, in Jamel (DE)
- 2016: OpenArt, in Roveredo (CH)
- 2015: OpenArt, in Roveredo (CH)
- 2015: FLOATING CUBE, in der Ermitage in Arlesheim (CH)
- 2014: Intervention Kunst im Bau, in Arlesheim (CH)
- 2012: Participation at international LandArt Meeting (PL)
- 2012: Participation at Exhibition "DEHORS" – Kunst im Wald, in Olten (CH)
- 2012: FOCUS Granitplastik in Arlesheim (CH)
- 2011: Group-exhibition in Schönenwerd (CH)
- 2010: Participation at international LandArt Meeting in Pordenone (IT)
- 2009: deschart an der Igeho, Messe Basel (CH)
- 2009: Intervention "Frames" im Park "Sculpture at Schoenthal" Langenbruck (CH)
- 2008: Participation at international " LandArt-meeting Pordenone" (IT)
- 2006: Participation at international "LandArt-Festival Grindelwald" (CH)
- 2005: Participation at international " LandArt-Festival Basel" (CH)
- 2001: Participation at international " Fête de l'eau ", Skulpturenausstellung in Wattwiller (F)
- 1998: Project Basel Baumzauber (CH)
- 1993–2008: Several LandArt-Projects in Provence, in collaboration with the German-French artist Wolf Warnke: Group-exhibitions «L'art de Mai» in Reillanne F

== See also ==
- List of architects
- List of sculptors
- List of Swiss people
