= Neuwiller =

Commune in Grand Est, France

- Commune
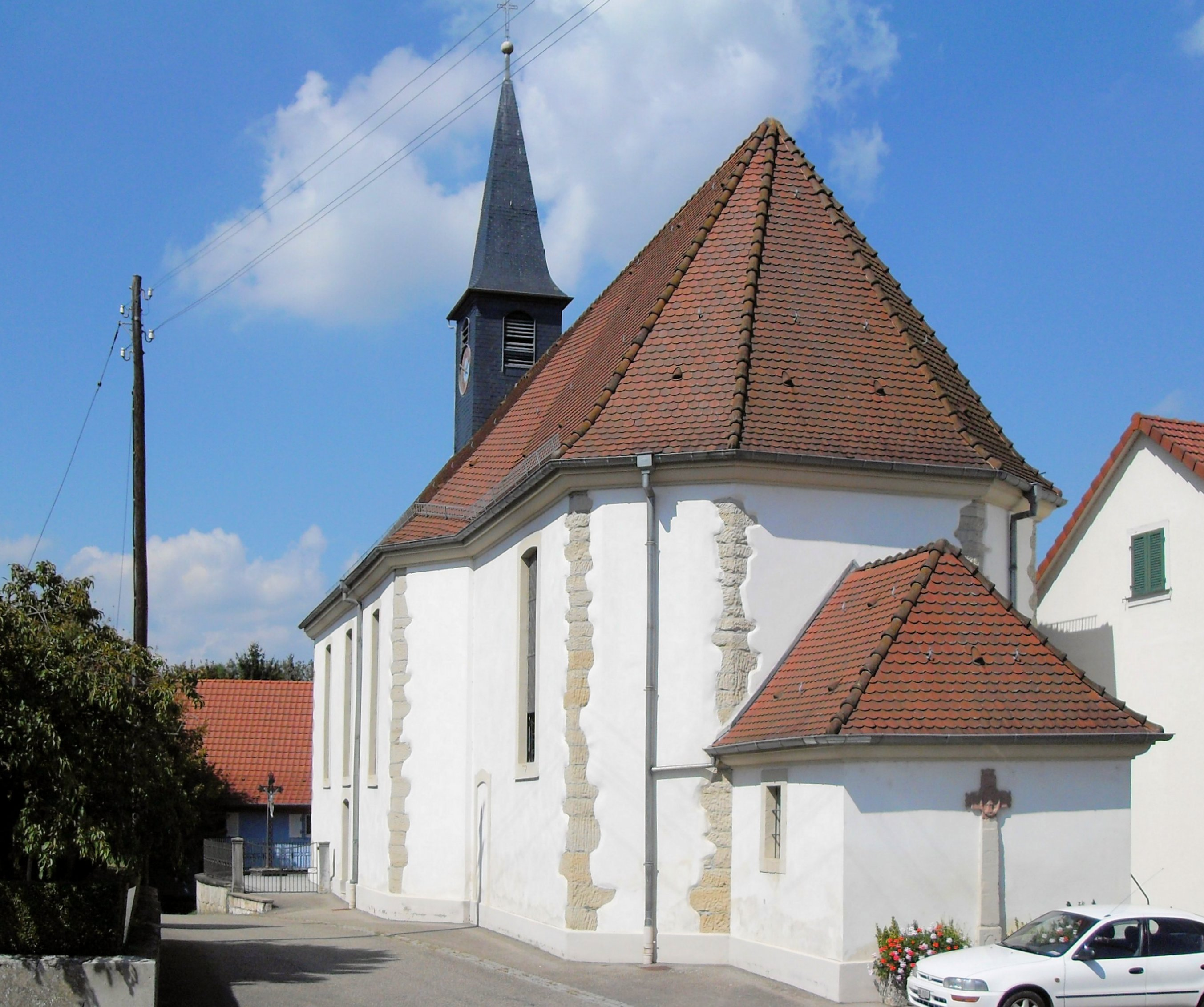
- The church in Neuwiller

- Coat of arms
- Location of Neuwiller
- Location within France Location within Grand Est
- Coordinates: 47°31′31″N 7°31′01″E
- Country: France
- Region: Grand Est
- Department: Haut-Rhin
- Arrondissement: Mulhouse
- Canton: Saint-Louis
- Intercommunality: Saint-Louis Agglomération

Government
  - Mayor (2020–2026): Carmelo Milintenda
- Area^{1}: 3.72 km^{2} (1.44 sq mi)
- Elevation: 330 m (1,080 ft)
- Highest elevation: 421 m (1,381 ft)
- Lowest elevation: 327 m (1,073 ft)
- Population (2023): 525
  - Density: 141/km^{2} (366/sq mi)
- Time zone: UTC+01:00 (CET)
  - Summer (DST): UTC+02:00 (CEST)
- INSEE/Postal code: 68232 /68220
- ^{1} French Land Register data, which excludes lakes, ponds, glaciers > 1 km^{2} (0.386 sq mi or 247 acres) and river estuaries.

Neuwiller (French pronunciation: [nœvilɛʁ], Alsatian and Basel German: Näiwil, German: Neuweiler) is a commune in the Haut-Rhin department in Alsace in north-eastern France. It is surrounded to the north, east and south by the Swiss canton of Basel-Landschaft, and is roughly 7 km from Basel itself.

== See also ==
- Communes of the Haut-Rhin department

Formally known as Linienhausen.
