= Reiningue =

Commune in Grand Est, France

- Commune
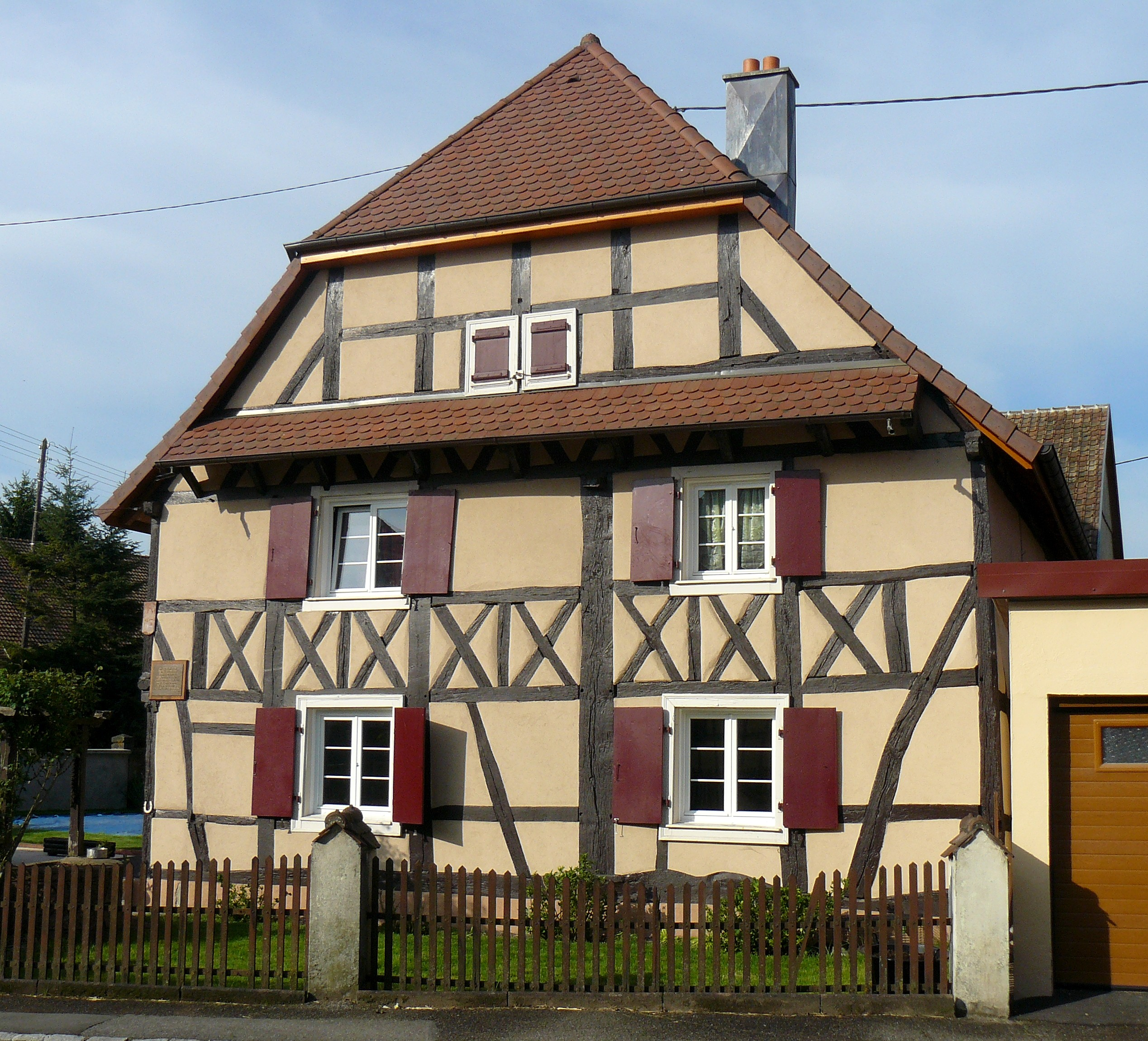
- The town hall in Reiningue

- Coat of arms
- Location of Reiningue
- Location within France Location within Grand Est
- Coordinates: 47°45′05″N 7°13′56″E
- Country: France
- Region: Grand Est
- Department: Haut-Rhin
- Arrondissement: Mulhouse
- Canton: Kingersheim
- Intercommunality: Mulhouse Alsace Agglomération

Government
  - Mayor (2020–2026): Alain Leconte
- Area^{1}: 18.54 km^{2} (7.16 sq mi)
- Elevation: 264 m (866 ft)
- Highest elevation: 297 m (974 ft)
- Lowest elevation: 255 m (837 ft)
- Population (2023): 1,894
  - Density: 102.2/km^{2} (264.6/sq mi)
- Time zone: UTC+01:00 (CET)
  - Summer (DST): UTC+02:00 (CEST)
- INSEE/Postal code: 68267 /68950
- ^{1} French Land Register data, which excludes lakes, ponds, glaciers > 1 km^{2} (0.386 sq mi or 247 acres) and river estuaries.

Reiningue (French pronunciation: [ʁɛnɛ̃g]; German: Reiningen) is a commune in the Haut-Rhin department in Alsace in north-eastern France. It forms part of the Mulhouse Alsace Agglomération, the inter-communal local government body for the Mulhouse conurbation.

The 11th-century Trappist Oelenberg Abbey is located in Reiningue.

== See also ==
- Communes of the Haut-Rhin department
