= Heimsbrunn =

Commune in Grand Est, France

- Commune
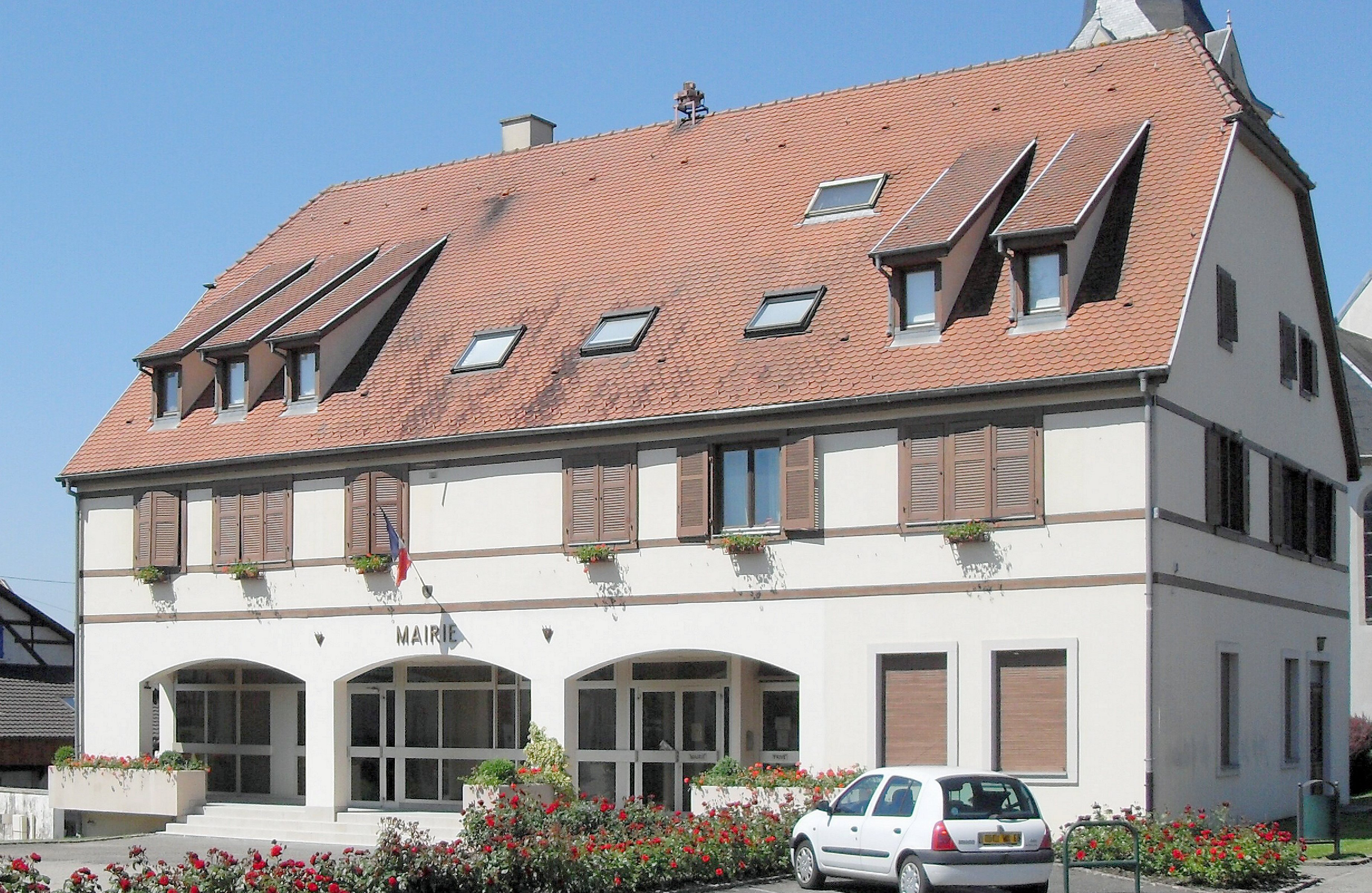
- The town hall in Heimsbrunn

- Coat of arms
- Location of Heimsbrunn
- Location within France Location within Grand Est
- Coordinates: 47°43′38″N 7°13′38″E
- Country: France
- Region: Grand Est
- Department: Haut-Rhin
- Arrondissement: Mulhouse
- Canton: Kingersheim
- Intercommunality: Mulhouse Alsace Agglomération

Government
  - Mayor (2020–2026): Jean-Paul Mor
- Area^{1}: 10.59 km^{2} (4.09 sq mi)
- Elevation: 280 m (920 ft)
- Highest elevation: 314 m (1,030 ft)
- Lowest elevation: 262 m (860 ft)
- Population (2023): 1,314
  - Density: 124.1/km^{2} (321.4/sq mi)
- Time zone: UTC+01:00 (CET)
  - Summer (DST): UTC+02:00 (CEST)
- INSEE/Postal code: 68129 /68990
- ^{1} French Land Register data, which excludes lakes, ponds, glaciers > 1 km^{2} (0.386 sq mi or 247 acres) and river estuaries.

Heimsbrunn (French pronunciation: [aimsbʁun]) is a commune in the Haut-Rhin department in Alsace in north-eastern France. It forms part of the Mulhouse Alsace Agglomération, the inter-communal local government body for the Mulhouse conurbation.

The village has an area of 10.59 km^{2} (4.09 sq mi).

== Population ==
Historical population
Year	Pop.	±% p.a.
1968	766	—
1975	830	+1.15%
1982	983	+2.45%
1990	1,098	+1.39%
1999	1,218	+1.16%
2007	1,419	+1.93%
2012	1,383	−0.51%
2017	1,325	−0.85%
2023	1,314	−0.14%
Source: INSEE

== See also ==
- Communes of the Haut-Rhin département
