= Galfingue =

Commune in Grand Est, France

- Commune
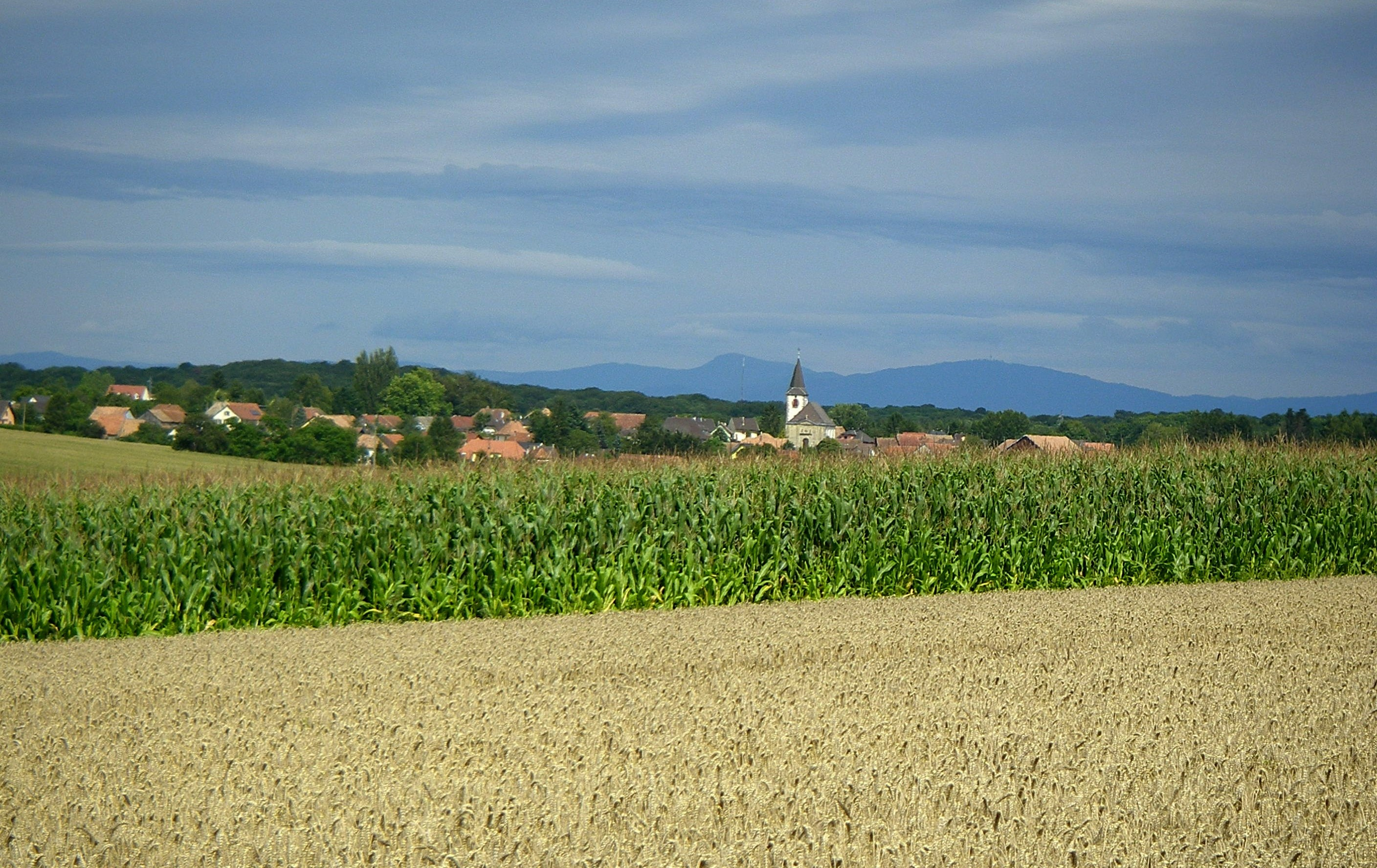
- A general view of Galfingue

- Coat of arms
- Location of Galfingue
- Location within France Location within Grand Est
- Coordinates: 47°42′21″N 7°13′29″E
- Country: France
- Region: Grand Est
- Department: Haut-Rhin
- Arrondissement: Mulhouse
- Canton: Kingersheim
- Intercommunality: Mulhouse Alsace Agglomération

Government
  - Mayor (2020–2026): Christophe Bitschene
- Area^{1}: 5.36 km^{2} (2.07 sq mi)
- Elevation: 290 m (950 ft)
- Highest elevation: 306 m (1,004 ft)
- Lowest elevation: 268 m (879 ft)
- Population (2023): 803
  - Density: 150/km^{2} (388/sq mi)
- Time zone: UTC+01:00 (CET)
  - Summer (DST): UTC+02:00 (CEST)
- INSEE/Postal code: 68101 /68990
- ^{1} French Land Register data, which excludes lakes, ponds, glaciers > 1 km^{2} (0.386 sq mi or 247 acres) and river estuaries.

Galfingue (French pronunciation: [ɡalfɛ̃ɡ]; German: Galfingen; Alsatian: Gàlfìnge) is a commune in the Haut-Rhin department of Alsace in north-eastern France. It forms part of the Mulhouse Alsace Agglomération, the inter-communal local government body for the Mulhouse conurbation.

== Population ==
Historical population
| Year | Pop. | ±% p.a. |
|---|---|---|
| 1968 | 363 | — |
| 1975 | 363 | +0.00% |
| 1982 | 508 | +4.92% |
| 1990 | 522 | +0.34% |
| 1999 | 561 | +0.80% |
| 2007 | 775 | +4.12% |
| 2012 | 792 | +0.43% |
| 2017 | 805 | +0.33% |
| 2023 | 803 | −0.04% |
Source: INSEE

== See also ==
- Communes of the Haut-Rhin département
