= Richwiller =

Commune in Grand Est, France

- Commune
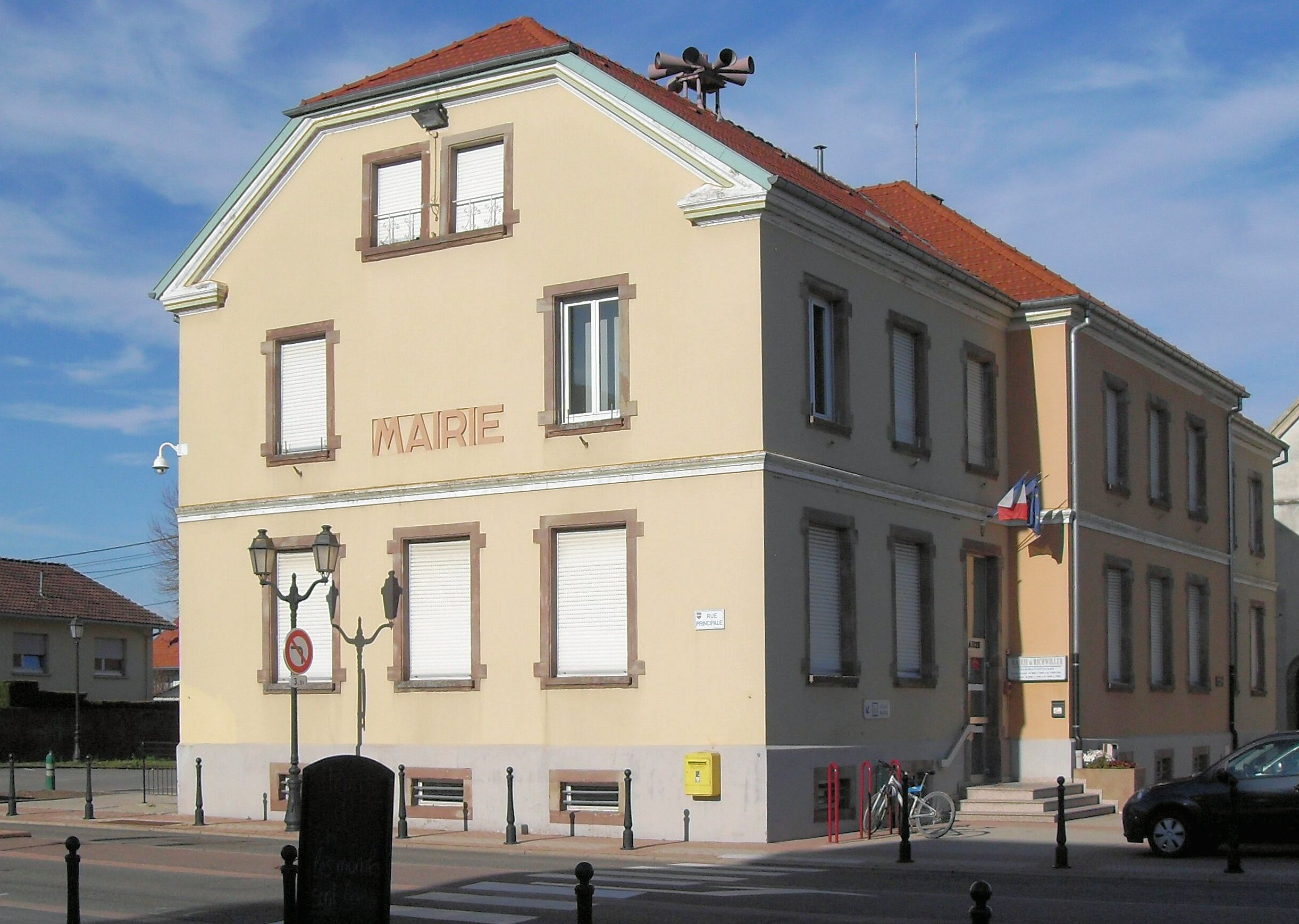
- The town hall in Richwiller

- Coat of arms
- Location of Richwiller
- Location within France Location within Grand Est
- Coordinates: 47°46′47″N 7°16′53″E
- Country: France
- Region: Grand Est
- Department: Haut-Rhin
- Arrondissement: Mulhouse
- Canton: Kingersheim
- Intercommunality: Mulhouse Alsace Agglomération

Government
  - Mayor (2020–2026): Vincent Hagenbach
- Area^{1}: 5.55 km^{2} (2.14 sq mi)
- Elevation: 247 m (810 ft)
- Highest elevation: 259 m (850 ft)
- Lowest elevation: 239 m (784 ft)
- Population (2023): 3,905
  - Density: 704/km^{2} (1,820/sq mi)
- Time zone: UTC+01:00 (CET)
  - Summer (DST): UTC+02:00 (CEST)
- INSEE/Postal code: 68270 /68120
- ^{1} French Land Register data, which excludes lakes, ponds, glaciers > 1 km^{2} (0.386 sq mi or 247 acres) and river estuaries.

Richwiller (French pronunciation: [ʁiʃvilɛʁ]; German: Reichweiler) is a commune in the Haut-Rhin department in Alsace in north-eastern France. It forms part of the Mulhouse Alsace Agglomération, the inter-communal local government body for the Mulhouse conurbation.

== Population ==
Historical population
Year	Pop.	±% p.a.
1968	2,352	—
1975	2,655	+1.75%
1982	2,938	+1.46%
1990	3,150	+0.87%
1999	3,325	+0.60%
2007	3,374	+0.18%
2012	3,516	+0.83%
2017	3,689	+0.97%
2023	3,905	+0.95%
Source: INSEE

== See also ==
- Communes of the Haut-Rhin department
