= Pfastatt =

Commune in Grand Est, France

Pfastatt Pfastatt / Pfàscht
- Commune
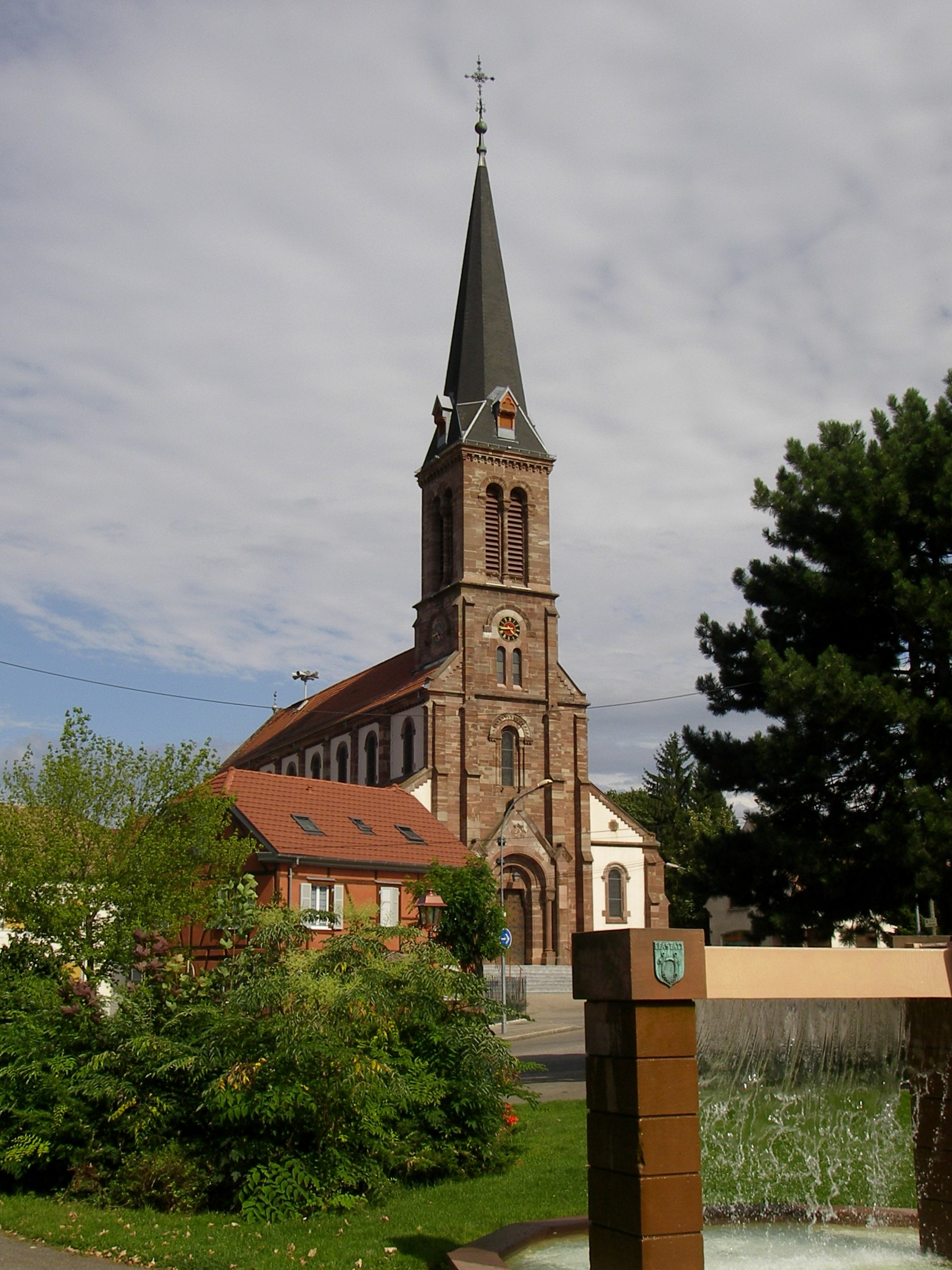
- The Church of Saint Maurice

- Coat of arms
- Location of Pfastatt
- Location within France Location within Grand Est
- Coordinates: 47°46′11″N 7°18′09″E
- Country: France
- Region: Grand Est
- Department: Haut-Rhin
- Arrondissement: Mulhouse
- Canton: Kingersheim
- Intercommunality: Mulhouse Alsace Agglomération

Government
  - Mayor (2020–2026): Francis Hillmeyer
- Area^{1}: 5.24 km^{2} (2.02 sq mi)
- Elevation: 245 m (804 ft)
- Highest elevation: 265 m (869 ft)
- Lowest elevation: 238 m (781 ft)
- Population (2023): 10,314
  - Density: 1,970/km^{2} (5,100/sq mi)
- Time zone: UTC+01:00 (CET)
  - Summer (DST): UTC+02:00 (CEST)
- INSEE/Postal code: 68256 /68120
- ^{1} French Land Register data, which excludes lakes, ponds, glaciers > 1 km^{2} (0.386 sq mi or 247 acres) and river estuaries.

Pfastatt (French pronunciation: [(p)fastat], [-ʃtat]; Alemannic German: Pfàscht Alemannic German pronunciation: [pfɔʃt]) is a commune in the Haut-Rhin department in Alsace in north-eastern France. It forms part of the Mulhouse Alsace Agglomération, the inter-communal local government body for the Mulhouse conurbation.

== Population ==
Historical population
Year	Pop.	±% p.a.
1968	5,986	—
1975	6,353	+0.85%
1982	6,247	−0.24%
1990	8,061	+3.24%
1999	7,946	−0.16%
2007	8,413	+0.72%
2012	9,269	+1.96%
2017	9,579	+0.66%
2023	10,314	+1.24%
Source: INSEE

== See also ==
- Communes of the Haut-Rhin department
