= Oelenberg Abbey =

Trappist monastery in Reiningue, Alsace, France

- Abbaye Notre-Dame d'Oelenberg
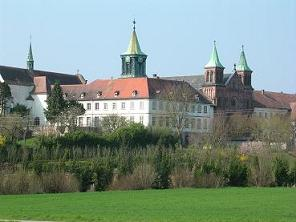

- Location within France Location within Grand Est Location within Alsace
- Interactive map of Oelenberg Abbey

Monastery information
- Other name: Abbatia B.M.V. de Oelenberg (Latin)
- Order: Canons Regular of St. Augustine (1046–1626); Jesuits (1626–1774); Trappists (1825–present)
- Established: 1046
- Mother house: Kleinburlo Abbey (line of Port-du-Salut Abbey)
- Dedication: Our Lady
- Diocese: Catholic Archdiocese of Strasbourg

People
- Founder: Heilwige of Dabo
- Abbot: See list

Architecture
- Heritage designation: Historic Monument (No. PA00085773)
- Designated date: June 16, 1992

Site
- Location: Reiningue, Haut-Rhin, France
- Coordinates: 47°44′46″N 7°12′48″E
- Website: https://www.abbaye-oelenberg.com/

Oelenberg Abbey (Latin: Abbatia B.M.V. de Oelenberg; French: Abbaye Notre-Dame d'Oelenberg; Alemannic German: Kloschter vum Eelabarg) is a Trappist monastery located in Reiningue near Mulhouse, France. It has been an important place of worship in Alsace since the 11th century and most recently hosted a small community of ten monks (as of 2024).

The former Augustinian then Jesuit church with its nave, its two-level transept, its choir and its burial vault were listed as a Historic Monument on June 16, 1992.

== History ==
In 1046, a priory of the Canons Regular of St. Augustine was founded by Heilwig of Dabo, Countess of Eguisheim and mother of Pope Leo IX. The latter dedicated the church in 1049. The abbey was originally a double monastery. In 1273, the nuns left for Cernay. In 1626, the abbey was handed over to the Jesuit college of Freiburg im Breisgau, then in 1774 to the University of Freiburg, until the community was suppressed and the site sold off as national property during the French Revolution. In 1825, a group of Cistercian monks from Kleinburlo Abbey, Darfeld in the Rhineland, settled in the buildings. They founded a daughter house at Mariawald in Germany in 1862. In the August of 1845 and June 1846, the Polish romantic poet Józef Bohdan Zaleski spent some time on spiritual retreats in the abbey.

During the First World War, a major part of Oelenberg Abbey was destroyed by bombing on June 26, 1915. The church, the organ of Rinckenbach and the conventual buildings suffered extensive damage. The abbatial church and the convent were re-built in 1920 by architect Paul Kirchacker of Mulhouse using the remains of the church. The choir stalls carved by Théophil Klem were scrupulously restored.

In 1925, the community founded Engelszell Abbey in Austria.

During the Second World War in November–December 1944, the abbey was partly destroyed. The French artillery wanted to spare the monastery, but had to bomb an observatory built by the Germans in the bell tower of the church.

In 1951, a new organ was built by Georges Schwenkedel.

In 1970, a manuscript was discovered in the monastery containing 54 tales collected by the Brothers Grimm. The Grimms had sent the manuscript in 1810 to the German writer Clemens Brentano, who never sent it back to them. Although the Brothers Grimm kept a copy of the book, it had since disappeared. This manuscript, known as the 1810 Manuscript or the Oelenberg Manuscript, is thus the first known extant version of Grimms' Fairy Tales. It is now kept at the Bodmer Library in Cologny in the canton of Geneva, Switzerland.

In 2016, the organ of the abbatial church was restored.

In 2023, there were 10 monks in the abbey, including four in training.

On the 8th of June 2024, the monks left the abbey to join a number of other monasteries. Mass is still celebrated every Sunday.

The life at Oelenberg is led by the Ora et labora ("Pray and work") practice of the Rule of Benedict interpreted by the Cistercian tradition.

== Architecture ==
The abbatial church has Romanesque, late Gothic and Baroque elements from the 12th century, 1486 and 1755 respectively. It is adorned with a 12th-century processional cross, a 14th-century crucifix, and two statues of the Virgin Mary of the 15th and 18th centuries.

The three chapels of Saint Michael, Saint Leo and the Mount of Olives (Ölberg in German, formerly Oelenberg) feature elements of the 12th century and of 1486, as well as a painting and a reliquary that come from Lucelle Abbey which was dissolved during the French Revolution.

== Organ ==
The organ of the abbatial church was made in 1951 by Georg Schwenkedel. It replaced an older instrument that was built in 1904 by Martin and Joseph Rinckenbach and destroyed by a bombing in 1915. The organ has 22 registers, two transmissions and two keyboards with a pedal.

I Grand Orgue C–g^{3}
1.	Bourdon	16′
2.	Montre	8′
3.	Flûte à cheminée	8′
4.	Salicional	8′
5.	Prestant	4′
6.	Flûte	2′
7.	Fourniture IV	1 1/3′

II Recit expressif C–g^{3}
8.	Cor de nuit	8′
9.	Gemshorn	8′
10.	Gambe douce	8′
11.	Voix céleste	8′
12.	Flûte	4′
13.	Nasard	2 2/3′
14.	Doublette	2′
15.	Tierce	1 3/5′
16.	Cymbale III	1′
17.	Trompette	8′
18.	Basson/Hautbois	8′
	Trémolo

Pédale C–f^{1}
19.	Soubasse	16′
20.	Bourdon (= Nr. 1)	16′
21.	Flûte	8′
22.	Bourdon (= Nr. 2)	8′
23.	Basse	4′
24.	Bombarde douce	16′

- Coupling: I/I (super-octave), II/I (also in sub-octave and super-octave), I/P, II/P (also in super-octave)

== List of Cistercian abbots of Oelenberg ==
- Eugène de Laprade, titular prior in 1795, abbot 1808 – 15 June 1816
- Petrus Klausener (Pierre Klausener), 10 November 1832 – 28 June 1850
- Ephrem van der Meulen, 1 August 1850 – 1 March 1884
- Andreas Zucktriegel, 31 March 1884 – 14 September 1889 (19 February 1893)
- Franziskus Strunk, 27 September 1889 – 1 January 1912
- Petrus Wacker, 29 January 1912 – 15 November 1949
- Robert Laverdure, 15 December 1949 – 22 June 1951
- Bernard Benz, 17 July 1951 – 12 September 1954
- Paul Offtinger, Sup. ad nutum 20 September 1954 – 20 September 1957
- François Rubrecht, Sup. ad nutum 24 September 1957 – 20 June 1959, abbot 20 June 1959 – 6 June 1971
- Stanislas Nicot, 2 July 1971 – 27 July 1980
- Eugène Manning, Sup. ad nutum 30 July 1980 – 14 February 1981, abbot 14 February 1981 – 6 April 1987
- Alphonse van den Broucke, Sup. ad nutum April 1987 – 27 December 1989
- Simon Carrère, Sup. ad nutum 22 January 1990 – 26 January 1991, abbot 26 January 1991 – 1 July 2003
- Antonio Lépore, Sup. ad nutum 1 July 2003 – 8 June 2004, abbot 8 June 2004 – 4 August 2012
- Théophane Lavens, Sup. ad nutum 29 Sep. 2012 – 3 July 2014
- Dominique-Marie Schoch, Sup. ad nutum 4 July 2014, abbot since 31 March 2017

== List of superiors and abbesses of Oelenberg ==
- 1825–1826: Hélène Van den Broeck
- 1826–1848: Stanislaus Schey
- 1848–1854: Joséphine Merklin (12 May 1802, Thann – 27 May 1854)
- 1854–1860: Humbeline Clercx (first abbess)
- 1860–1863: Pelagia Faulhaber
- 1863–1866: Elisabeth Van De Grootveen
- 1866–1881: Hieronyma Liétard
- 1881–1881: Raphael Lichtle
- 1882–1895: Scholastika Dibling

== See also ==
- List of Cistercian monasteries in France
- List of Jesuit sites

== Bibliography ==
In French

- Husser, Raymond (1985). Reiningue. Oelenberg. Deux noms, un destin (in French). Strasbourg: Editions Coprur.

In German

- Ruff, Karl (1898). Die Trappistenabtei Oelenberg und der Reformierte Cistercienser-Orden (in German). Freiburg.
- Hecker, Anton (1904). Ein Besuch bei den Trappisten auf Oelenberg i. E. Reise-Erinnerung (in German). Wörishofen..
- Sacerdos, Friedrich (1917). "Die Augustinerpropstei Oelenberg im Elsaß als Kommende (1530–1626)". Zeitschrift der Gesellschaft für Beförderung der Geschichts-, Altertums- und Volkskunde von Freiburg, dem Breisgau und den umliegenden Landschaften (in German). 32: 131–162.
- Sacerdos, Friedrich (1922). "Die Propstei Oelenberg im Elsaß als Residenz der Freiburger Jesuiten 1626-1773". Freiburger Diözesan-Archiv (in German). 50: 82–143.
- Krebs, Manfred (1940). "Die Nekrologfragmente des Chorherrenstiftes Oelenberg". Zeitschrift für die Geschichte des Oberrheins. Neue Folge (in German). 53: 241–255.
- Kleiber, Eugène (1954). "Die drei Sundgau-Priorate St. Morand, St. Ulrich und Ölenberg". Annuaire de la Société d'Histoire Sundgauvienne (in German): 148–153.
- Stintzi, Paul (1962). Geschichte der Abtei Oelenberg 1046–1954. Alsatica Monastica (in German). Vol. 4. Westmalle.
- Schadelbauer, Karl (1966). Die Urkunden des Klosters Ölenberg im Elsaß von 1188 bis 1565. Veröffentlichungen aus dem Stadtarchiv Innsbruck. II. Reihe: Innsbrucker Archivnotizen zur Geschichte der Österreichischen Vorlande (in German). Vol. 5. Innsbruck.
