= Kingersheim =

Commune in Grand Est, France

Kingersheim Kingersche (Alsatian)
- Commune
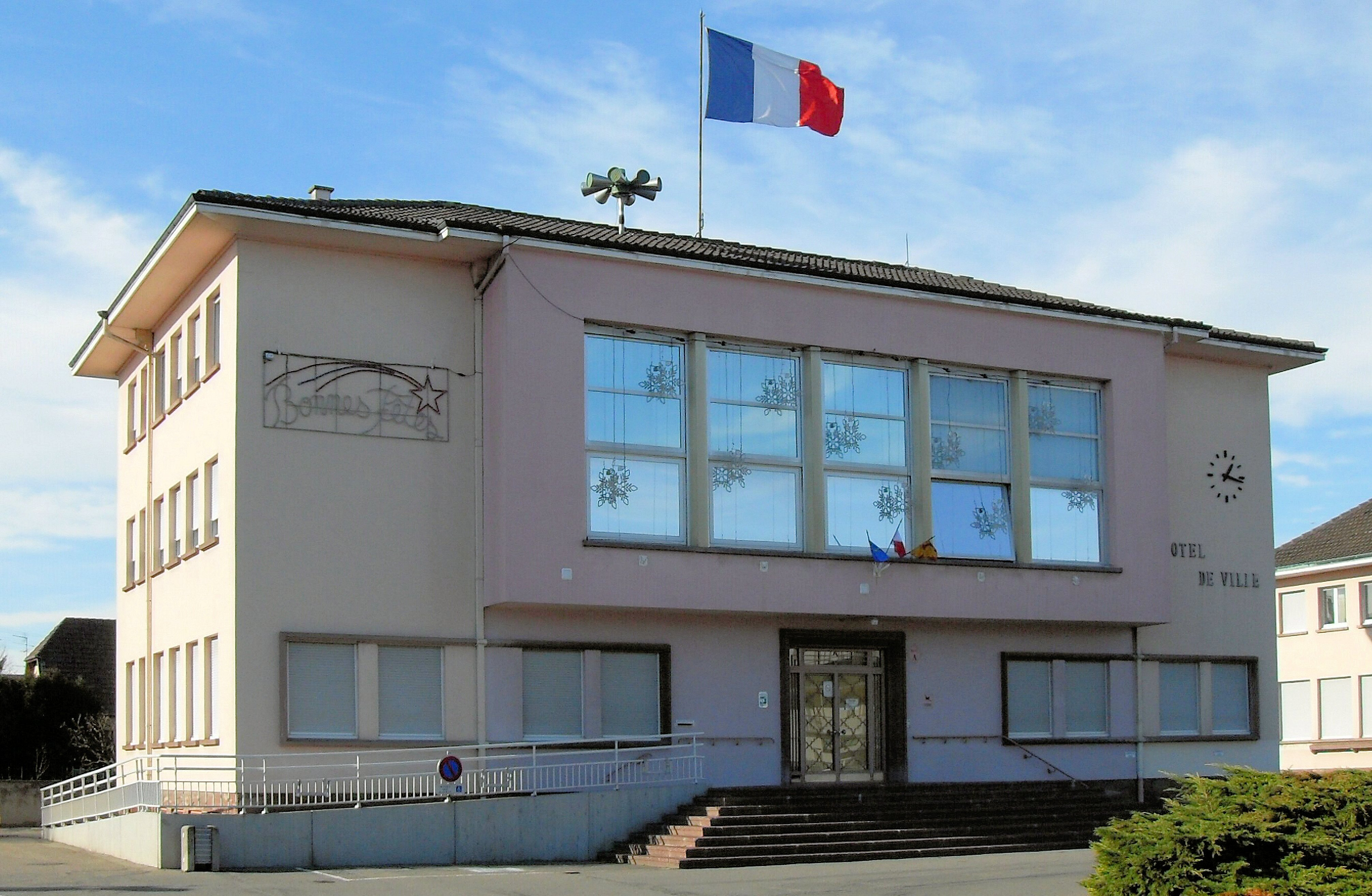
- Town hall

- Coat of arms
- Location of Kingersheim
- Location within France Location within Grand Est
- Coordinates: 47°47′32″N 7°20′19″E
- Country: France
- Region: Grand Est
- Department: Haut-Rhin
- Arrondissement: Mulhouse
- Canton: Kingersheim
- Intercommunality: Mulhouse Alsace Agglomération (M2A)

Government
  - Mayor (2020–2026): Laurent Riche
- Area^{1}: 6.69 km^{2} (2.58 sq mi)
- Elevation: 230 m (750 ft)
- Highest elevation: 250 m (820 ft)
- Lowest elevation: 227 m (745 ft)
- Population (2023): 13,354
  - Density: 2,000/km^{2} (5,170/sq mi)
- Time zone: UTC+01:00 (CET)
  - Summer (DST): UTC+02:00 (CEST)
- INSEE/Postal code: 68166 /68260
- ^{1} French Land Register data, which excludes lakes, ponds, glaciers > 1 km^{2} (0.386 sq mi or 247 acres) and river estuaries.

Kingersheim (French pronunciation: [kiŋ(ɡ)əʁsaim]; German pronunciation: [kɪŋɐsˌhaɪ̯m]; Alsatian: Kingersche) is a commune in the Haut-Rhin department, Grand Est (formerly Alsace), northeastern France. It forms part of the Mulhouse Alsace Agglomération, the inter-communal local government body for the Mulhouse conurbation. A few centuries ago, it was still a small village but nowadays Kingersheim has become the eighth municipality of the Haut-Rhin. The town is mainly a residential district but it is also an important commercial area which extends up to Wittenheim. Its inhabitants are called Kingersheimois and Kingersheimoises.

== Geography ==
Located in the Alsace plain, the town of Kingersheim has almost no hills.

Since the 1970s, its population increased a lot, owing to its situation in the urban agglomeration of Mulhouse. During these last years, the urbanization got denser, especially because of the construction of new houses and the construction of a "Green District".

== History ==
Kingersheim first appeared in 1195, and was named Kemingsen. Its origin is from a legend, concerning a hunting lodge probably erected in the historic center. The Schoenensteinbach chronicle is about the condition of the parishes of Wittenheim and Kingersheim during the 12th and 13th centuries. This Chronicle recalls that in the year 1199, the bishop Lüthold de Bâle, commanded the Kingersheim chapel to be connected to Wittenheim parish. In 1202, Pope Innocent III confirmed the ruling letters of the two bishops and in 1216, Neuwiller abbey gave as a present to the Schoenensteinbach monastery, a relic of Saint Adelphe which was dropped off in Kingersheim chapel.

Noblemen of Hus Wittenheim were the lords of Kingersheim since the 14th century and thereafter, their successors were the Andlau nobles. Many titles or charters of investiture have been written, among which the 1351 title. It is written that Therry de Hust is invested of a quarter of Wittenheim castle as well as a quarter of Kingersheim village. Wittenheim village formerly constituted in the feudal system the body of a burg having received a charter which allowed the lords to govern more than one village, amongst others, Kingersheim village.

In 1473, Lazare d'Andlau was invested of Kingersheim village by Pierre de Hagenbach, grand bailiff of Charles le Téméraire. Lazare was married to Judith de Ramstein and they had a son named Louis (1474-1509). Knight, he was the founder of the branch of the Kingersheim Andlau.

The autonomy of the town appeared in the end of the 15th century. Louis d'Andlau of Kingersheim was the first Andlau to build Kingersheim castle and to live within it.

== Population ==
Historical population
Year	Pop.	±% p.a.
1968	5,925	—
1975	7,928	+4.25%
1982	9,655	+2.86%
1990	11,258	+1.94%
1999	11,961	+0.68%
2007	13,159	+1.20%
2012	12,954	−0.31%
2017	13,055	+0.16%
2023	13,354	+0.38%
Source: INSEE

== Discovering the city ==
=== St Adelphe Church ===
St Adelphe Church belongs to the historic heritage of the city. Its 150th birthday was celebrated on 11 September 2011.

=== Créa ===
In 1913, Kingersheim wasn’t a big city, rather a small village. Six café-restaurants were listed in its phone book. These all faced the heart of Kingersheim: the town hall-school.

Nowadays, the Créa is one of the most important sites in the town, with several cultural events held each month. The Créa has become a central locus for Kingersheim children to spend their free time: many activities such as theatre, sport (including classical dance and swimming), drawing, painting, sewing and pottery are offered to the inhabitants. Moreover, holiday centers are organized during school holidays. There is a library on the top floor.

=== Playgrounds ===
Many places to relax and playgrounds are offered in Kingersheim. These are well fitted out and secured. Thus, the inhabitants, especially the children and the teenagers, spend a lot of time outside, enjoying the following city planning: Bramont playground (football pitch), Béarn playground (football and basketball pitch), Vert-Village (basketball pitch), Fernand-Anna (football pitch) and more recently the new Plaine de foot et de loisirs next to the Gounod gymnasium.

=== Tival ===
This modern auditorium was built in 2000 in one of the last remaining buildings of the old textile mill, a homage to the town's industrial past. The auditorium is located in the center of the town and well integrated within the cultural programming of Kingersheim. Due to its large stage (11 meters in width), a room that can seat 290 people and receive until 670 people standing, the Tival Area can host shows, concerts, dance, meetings, and exhibitions. Particularly notable is its hosting of the annual Momix festival, an international festival for young people.

=== Momix ===
Every year, for more than 20 years, Kingersheim City has offered and organized Momix. Since 1992, this festival for young and adults offers, during a week, about forty representations of drama, circus, dance, puppets and music. In 2006, this festival was labeled "Scène conventionnée Jeune Public d'Alsace" and is now a national and international reference.

=== Le Hangar ===
This is now the Kingersheim community center.

== See also ==
- Communes of the Haut-Rhin département
