= Canton of Kingersheim =

Coordinates: 47.79°N 7.33°E

The canton of Kingersheim is an administrative division of the Haut-Rhin department, northeastern France. It was created at the French canton reorganisation which came into effect in March 2015. Its seat is in Kingersheim.

It consists of the following communes:

1. Galfingue
2. Heimsbrunn
3. Kingersheim
4. Lutterbach
5. Morschwiller-le-Bas
6. Pfastatt
7. Reiningue
8. Richwiller
