= Morschwiller-le-Bas =

Commune in Grand Est, France

Morschwiller-le-Bas Niedermorschwiller
- Commune
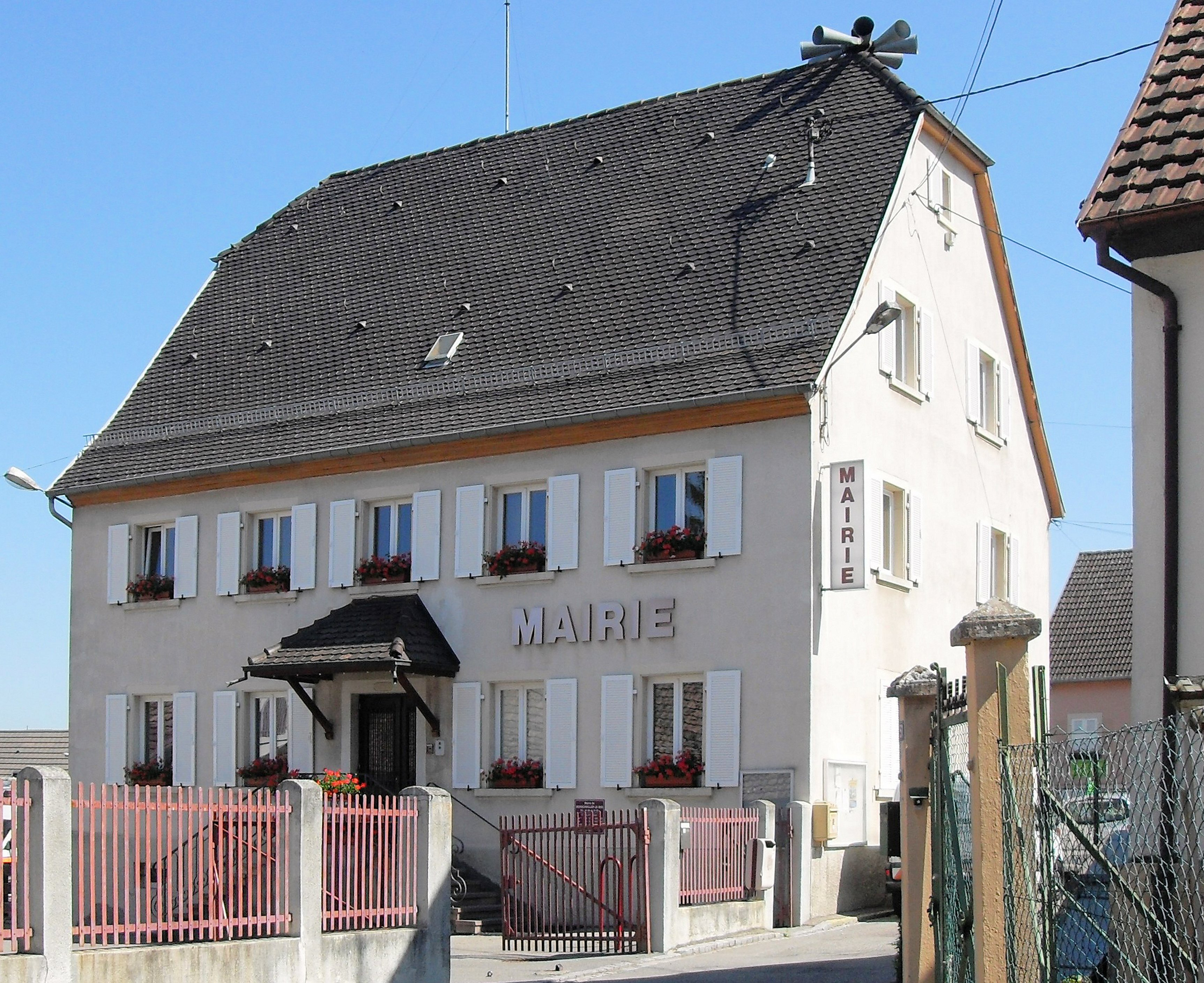
- The town hall in Morschwiller-le-Bas

- Coat of arms
- Location of Morschwiller-le-Bas
- Location within France Location within Grand Est
- Coordinates: 47°44′12″N 7°16′16″E
- Country: France
- Region: Grand Est
- Department: Haut-Rhin
- Arrondissement: Mulhouse
- Canton: Kingersheim
- Intercommunality: Mulhouse Alsace Agglomération

Government
  - Mayor (2020–2026): Josiane Mehlen
- Area^{1}: 7.55 km^{2} (2.92 sq mi)
- Elevation: 265 m (869 ft)
- Highest elevation: 311 m (1,020 ft)
- Lowest elevation: 248 m (814 ft)
- Population (2023): 3,694
  - Density: 489/km^{2} (1,270/sq mi)
- Time zone: UTC+01:00 (CET)
  - Summer (DST): UTC+02:00 (CEST)
- INSEE/Postal code: 68218 /68790
- ^{1} French Land Register data, which excludes lakes, ponds, glaciers > 1 km^{2} (0.386 sq mi or 247 acres) and river estuaries.

Morschwiller-le-Bas (French pronunciation: [mɔʁʃvilɛʁ lə ba]; German: Niedermorschweiler) is a commune located in the Haut-Rhin department of Alsace in north-eastern France. It is a part of the Mulhouse Alsace Agglomération, which serves as the inter-communal local government entity for the Mulhouse conurbation.

Notably, Composer and organist Julien Koszul (1844–1927), who was the grandfather of both mathematician Jean-Louis Koszul and composer Henri Dutilleux, was born in Morschwiller-le-Bas.

== Population ==
Historical population
Year	Pop.	±% p.a.
1968	1,920	—
1975	2,122	+1.44%
1982	2,206	+0.56%
1990	2,445	+1.29%
1999	2,606	+0.71%
2007	3,126	+2.30%
2012	3,527	+2.44%
2017	3,766	+1.32%
2023	3,694	−0.32%
Source: INSEE

== Geography ==
located in north-eastern France, within the Grand Est region, specifically in the Haut-Rhin department. It lies about 5 kilometers southwest of the city of Mulhouse.

The commune covers an area of approximately 7.55 square kilometers, with elevations ranging from 248 to 311 meters above sea level, and an average altitude of around 260 meters.

== Climate ==
The climate of Morschwiller-le-Bas is characterized by a temperate continental pattern influenced by the Alsace region, which lies in the rain shadow of the Vosges Mountains, resulting in lower precipitation compared to surrounding areas. Winters are distinctly cold with the possibility of snowfall, while summers are warm to moderately hot. Temperatures typically range from low averages around freezing in winter months to about 25–30 °C at the height of summer. Rainfall is distributed throughout the year, although spring and autumn often record the highest levels of precipitation.

== See also ==
- Communes of the Haut-Rhin département
- Dornach (Mulhouse)
