= Julien Koszul =

French organist (1844–1927)

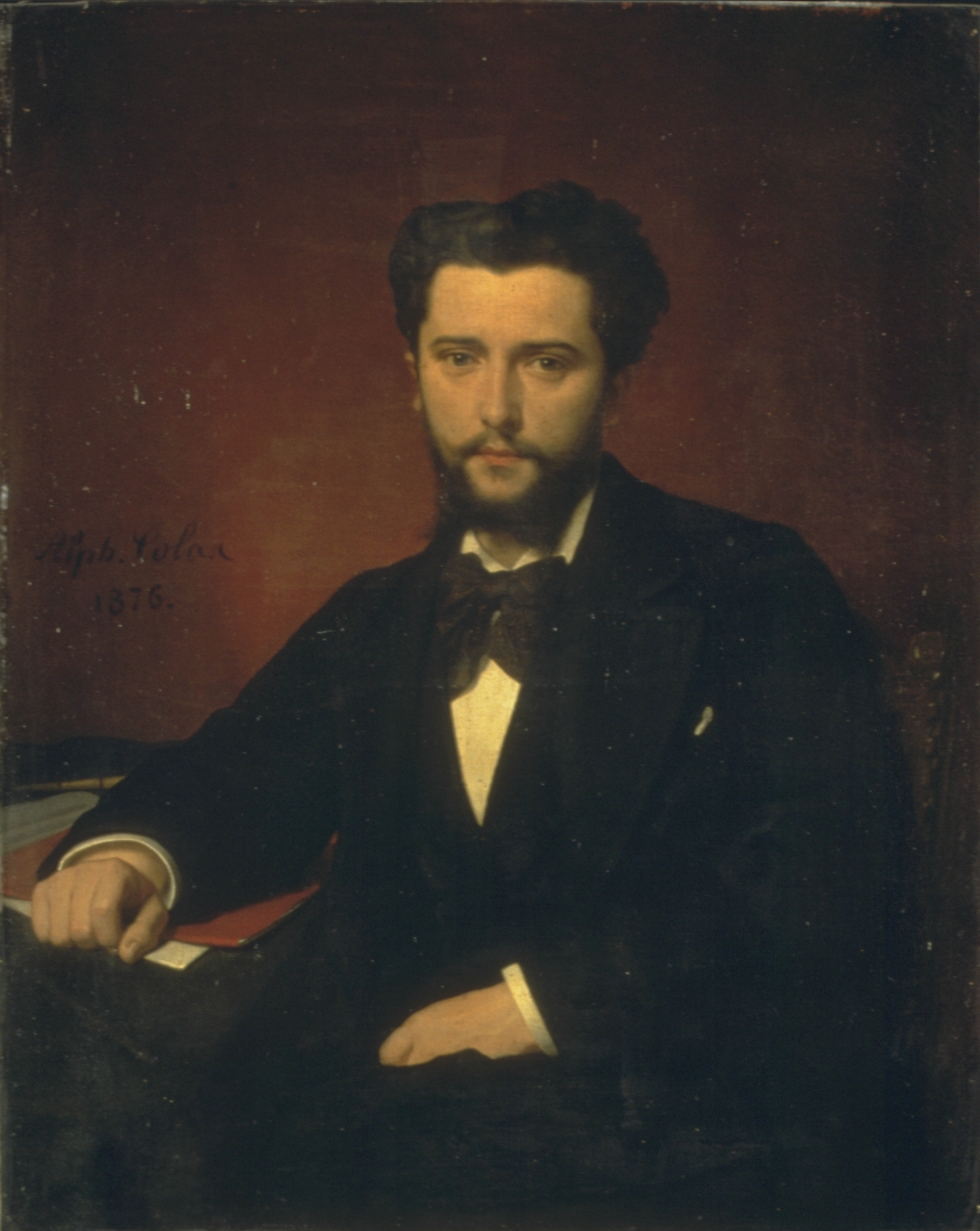
- Born: 4 December 1844; Morschwiller-le-Bas
- Died: 15 January 1927 (aged 82); Douai
- Occupations: Composer; Organist

Julien Koszul (4 December 1844 – 15 January 1927) was a French composer and pipe organist from Alsace.

== Biography ==
Born in Morschwiller-le-Bas, Alsace, Koszul studied at the École Niedermeyer de Paris with Camille Saint-Saëns, together with Gabriel Fauré and Eugène Gigout as fellow students and friends.

He moved to Roubaix, where he took the direction of the National Conservatory of Music. He encouraged Albert Roussel to undertake an artistic career.

Composer Henri Dutilleux and mathematician Jean-Louis Koszul were his grandsons. Henri Dutilleux, who often recalled his memory, paid tribute to him in 2005 by being the originator of the publication of his correspondence.

Koszul died in Douai.

== Selected compositions ==
- 1872: Deux Mélodies, poem by Charles Manso
- 1873: Romanzette pour piano. No 1, In E ♭, N ° 2, in C
- 1875: Puisque mai tout en fleurs ! Mélodie: No 1 contralto, baritone or mezzo-soprano
- 1877: Aubade! Mélody for tenor, lyric by Charles Manso
- 1879: S'il est un charmant Gazon !, poem by Victor Hugo
- 1879: Bonsoir, Madeleine! lullaby for soprano or tenor, poem by Marc Mounier
- 1879: Sonnet!, poem by Marc Monnier
- 1893: Cantate Nadaud, for solis, choir and military and symphonic orchesters, poem by Jules Rosoor; score (piano and voice), Tourcoing : Rosoor-Delattre, (Bibliothèque nationale de France)
- 1902: Quo vadis! scène chorale, ..., poem by Jules Rosoor (Bibliothèque nationale de France)
- 1925: Yvonnette, little Walloon waltz, for piano
- Première Valse (recording)
