= Sickert =

Sickert may refer to:

- Oswald Sickert (1828–1885), Danish-German artist, father of Walter Sickert
- Walter Sickert (1860–1942), German-English artist
- Sickert, Haut-Rhin, commune in the Haut-Rhin department in Alsace in north-eastern France
