= Magny, Haut-Rhin =

Commune in Grand Est, France

Magny
- Commune
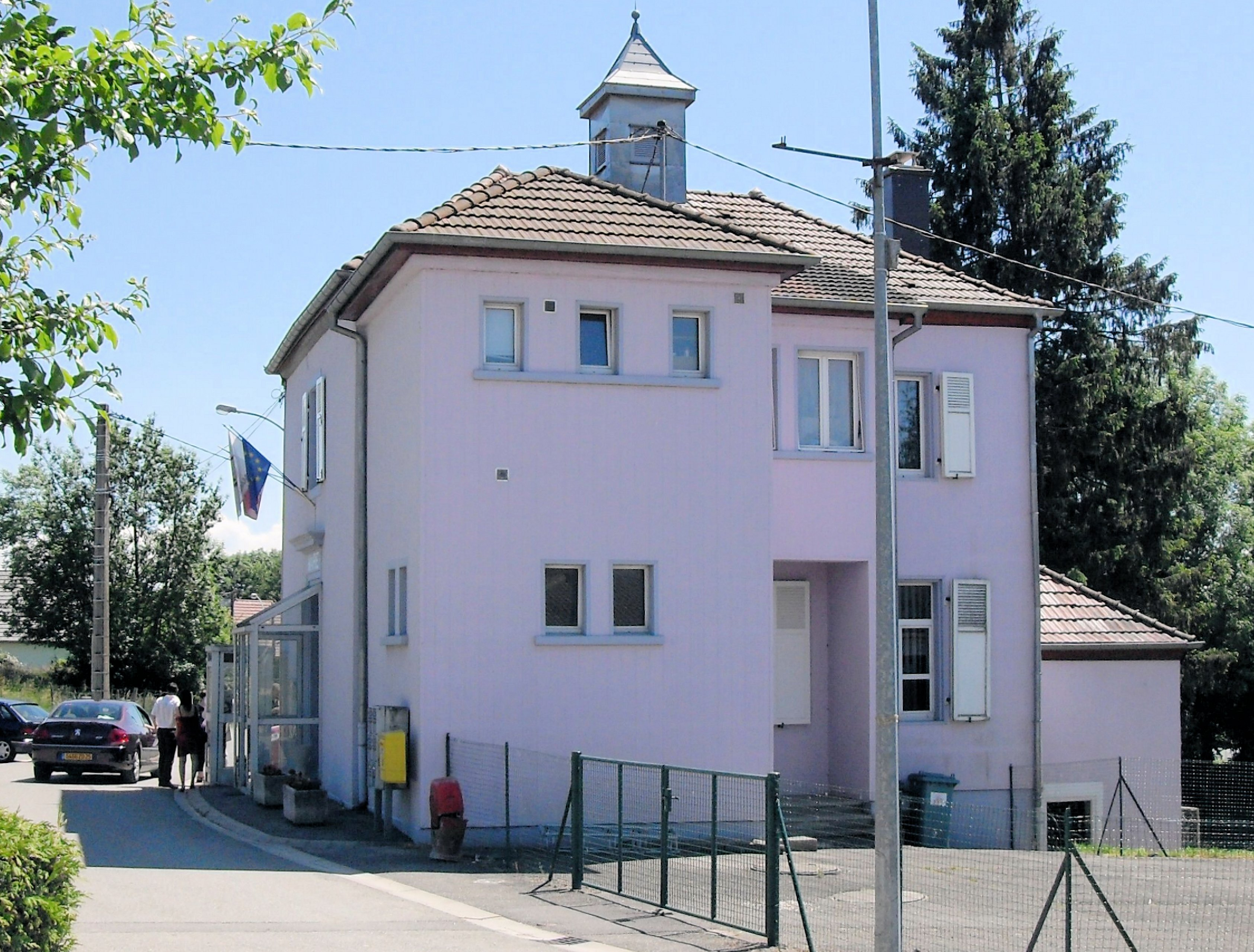
- The town hall in Magny

- Coat of arms
- Location of Magny
- Location within France Location within Grand Est
- Coordinates: 47°36′19″N 7°03′15″E
- Country: France
- Region: Grand Est
- Department: Haut-Rhin
- Arrondissement: Altkirch
- Canton: Masevaux-Niederbruck
- Intercommunality: Sud Alsace Largue

Government
  - Mayor (2020–2026): Didier Menetre
- Area^{1}: 4.3 km^{2} (1.7 sq mi)
- Elevation: 360 m (1,180 ft)
- Highest elevation: 376 m (1,234 ft)
- Lowest elevation: 340 m (1,120 ft)
- Population (2023): 286
  - Density: 67/km^{2} (170/sq mi)
- Time zone: UTC+01:00 (CET)
  - Summer (DST): UTC+02:00 (CEST)
- INSEE/Postal code: 68196 /68210
- ^{1} French Land Register data, which excludes lakes, ponds, glaciers > 1 km^{2} (0.386 sq mi or 247 acres) and river estuaries.

Magny (French pronunciation: [maɲi]) is a commune in the Haut-Rhin department in Alsace in north-eastern France.

== See also ==
- Communes of the Haut-Rhin département
