= Mertzen =

Commune in Grand Est, France

- Commune
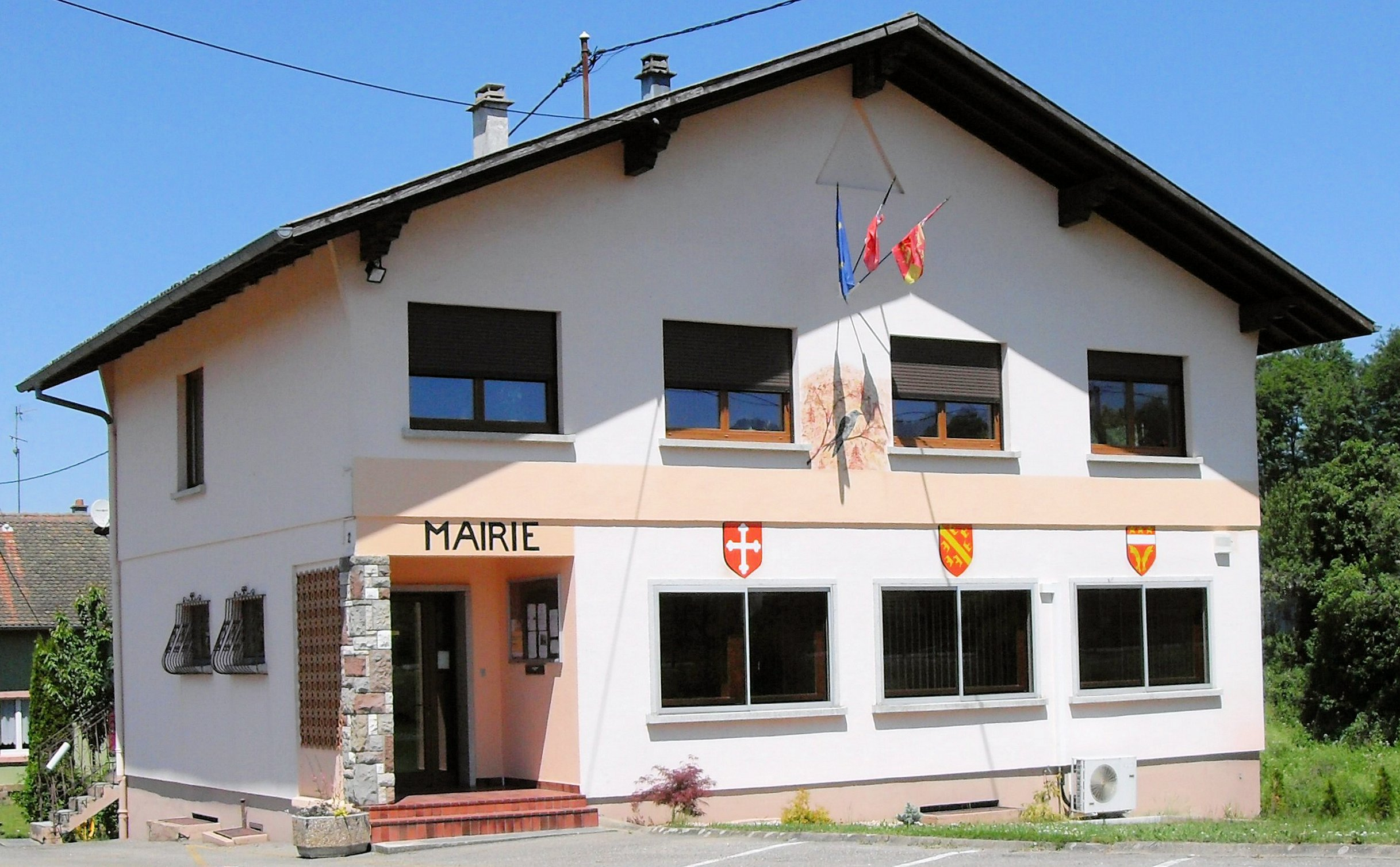
- The town hall in Mertzen

- Coat of arms
- Location of Mertzen
- Location within France Location within Grand Est
- Coordinates: 47°35′28″N 7°07′52″E
- Country: France
- Region: Grand Est
- Department: Haut-Rhin
- Arrondissement: Altkirch
- Canton: Masevaux-Niederbruck

Government
  - Mayor (2020–2026): José Wininger
- Area^{1}: 2.01 km^{2} (0.78 sq mi)
- Elevation: 350 m (1,150 ft)
- Highest elevation: 400 m (1,300 ft)
- Lowest elevation: 329 m (1,079 ft)
- Population (2023): 200
  - Density: 100/km^{2} (260/sq mi)
- Time zone: UTC+01:00 (CET)
  - Summer (DST): UTC+02:00 (CEST)
- INSEE/Postal code: 68202 /68210
- ^{1} French Land Register data, which excludes lakes, ponds, glaciers > 1 km^{2} (0.386 sq mi or 247 acres) and river estuaries.

Mertzen (French pronunciation: [mɛʁtsən]; German: Merzen) is a commune in the Haut-Rhin department in Alsace in north-eastern France.

== See also ==
- Communes of the Haut-Rhin département
