= Balschwiller =

Commune in Grand Est, France

- Commune
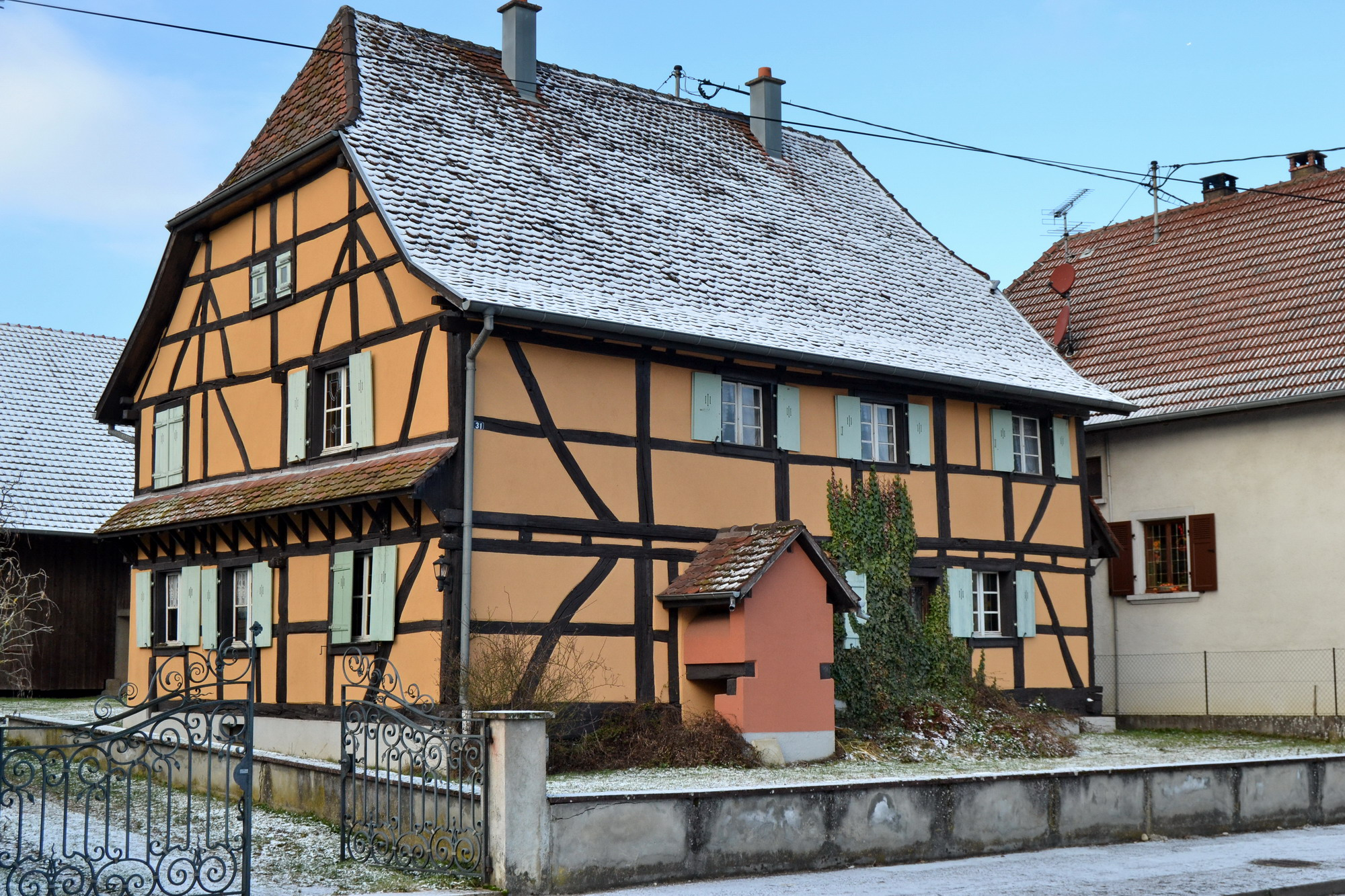
- A half-timbered house in Balschwiller

- Coat of arms
- Location of Balschwiller
- Location within France Location within Grand Est
- Coordinates: 47°40′10″N 7°10′09″E
- Country: France
- Region: Grand Est
- Department: Haut-Rhin
- Arrondissement: Altkirch
- Canton: Masevaux-Niederbruck

Government
  - Mayor (2020–2026): Thierry Jacoberger
- Area^{1}: 9.79 km^{2} (3.78 sq mi)
- Elevation: 280 m (920 ft)
- Highest elevation: 348 m (1,142 ft)
- Lowest elevation: 273 m (896 ft)
- Population (2023): 729
  - Density: 74.5/km^{2} (193/sq mi)
- Time zone: UTC+01:00 (CET)
  - Summer (DST): UTC+02:00 (CEST)
- INSEE/Postal code: 68018 /68210
- ^{1} French Land Register data, which excludes lakes, ponds, glaciers > 1 km^{2} (0.386 sq mi or 247 acres) and river estuaries.

Balschwiller (French pronunciation: [balʃvilɛʁ]; German: Balschweiler) is a commune in the Haut-Rhin department in Alsace in north-eastern France.

== See also ==
- Communes of the Haut-Rhin department
