= Strueth =

Commune in Grand Est, France

- Commune
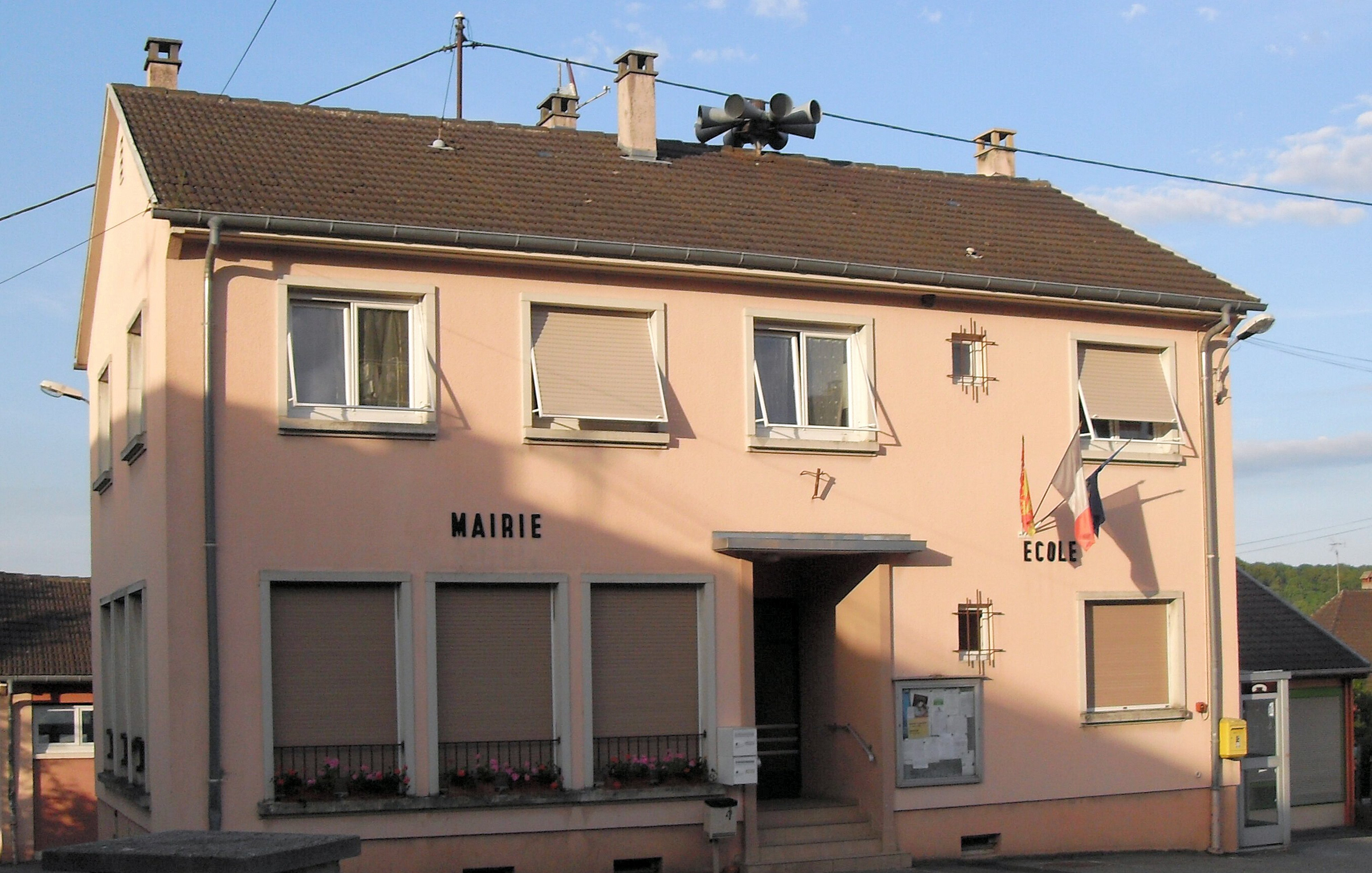
- The town hall and school in Strueth

- Coat of arms
- Location of Strueth
- Location within France Location within Grand Est
- Coordinates: 47°35′02″N 7°07′32″E
- Country: France
- Region: Grand Est
- Department: Haut-Rhin
- Arrondissement: Altkirch
- Canton: Masevaux-Niederbruck

Government
  - Mayor (2020–2026): Jean-Jacques Mathieu
- Area^{1}: 4.31 km^{2} (1.66 sq mi)
- Elevation: 360 m (1,180 ft)
- Highest elevation: 406 m (1,332 ft)
- Lowest elevation: 334 m (1,096 ft)
- Population (2023): 360
  - Density: 84/km^{2} (220/sq mi)
- Time zone: UTC+01:00 (CET)
  - Summer (DST): UTC+02:00 (CEST)
- INSEE/Postal code: 68330 /68580
- ^{1} French Land Register data, which excludes lakes, ponds, glaciers > 1 km^{2} (0.386 sq mi or 247 acres) and river estuaries.

Strueth (German: Strüth) is a commune in the Haut-Rhin department in Alsace in north-eastern France.

== See also ==
- Communes of the Haut-Rhin department
