= Chavannes-sur-l'Étang =

Commune in Grand Est, France

- Commune
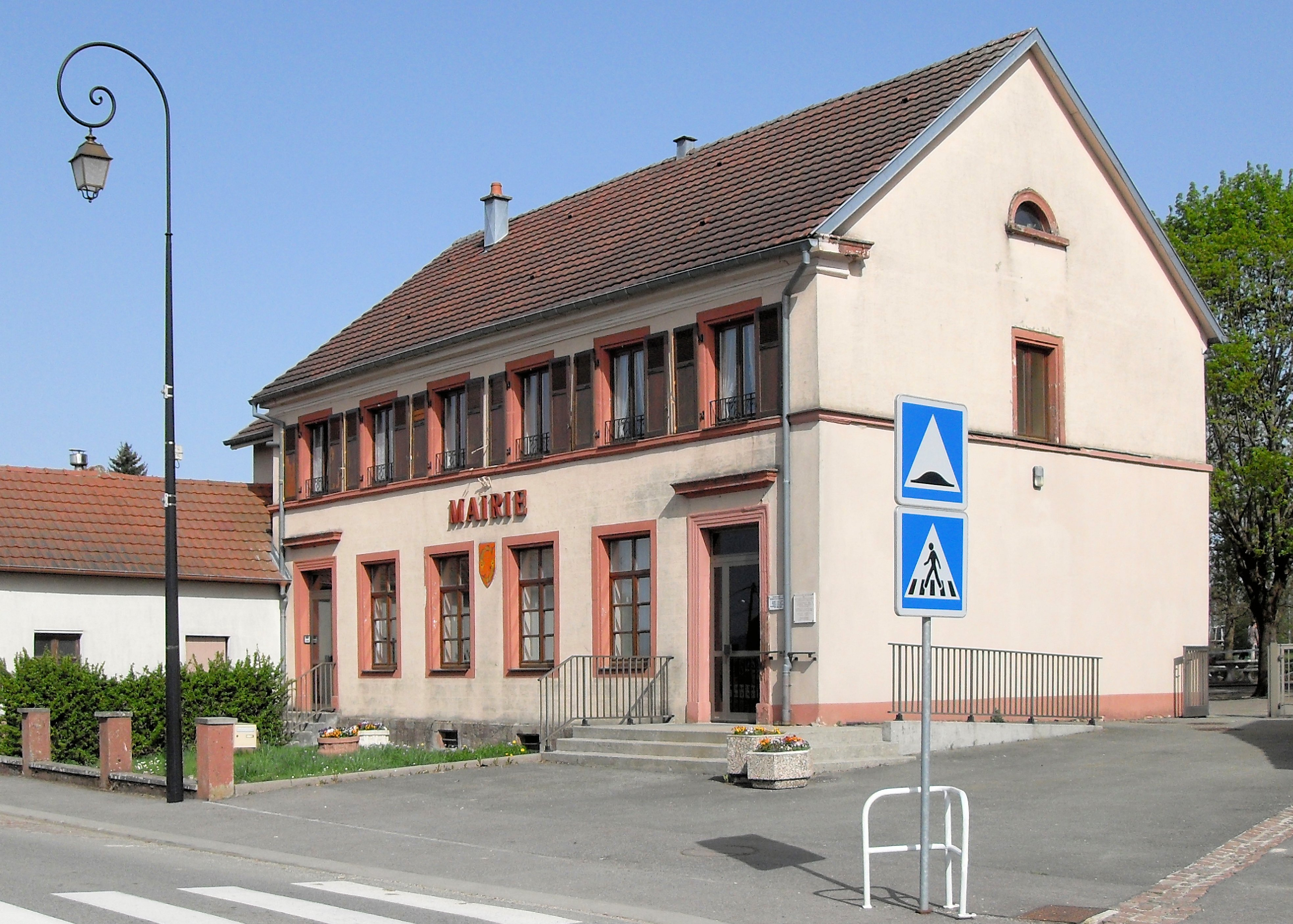
- The town hall in Chavannes-sur-l'Étang

- Coat of arms
- Location of Chavannes-sur-l'Étang
- Location within France Location within Grand Est
- Coordinates: 47°37′57″N 7°01′31″E
- Country: France
- Region: Grand Est
- Department: Haut-Rhin
- Arrondissement: Altkirch
- Canton: Masevaux-Niederbruck

Government
  - Mayor (2024–2026): Denis Astgen
- Area^{1}: 6.04 km^{2} (2.33 sq mi)
- Elevation: 360 m (1,180 ft)
- Highest elevation: 373 m (1,224 ft)
- Lowest elevation: 345 m (1,132 ft)
- Population (2023): 652
  - Density: 108/km^{2} (280/sq mi)
- Time zone: UTC+01:00 (CET)
  - Summer (DST): UTC+02:00 (CEST)
- INSEE/Postal code: 68065 /68210
- ^{1} French Land Register data, which excludes lakes, ponds, glaciers > 1 km^{2} (0.386 sq mi or 247 acres) and river estuaries.

Chavannes-sur-l'Étang (French pronunciation: [ʃavan syʁ letɑ̃]; German: Schaffnatt am Weiher) is a commune in the Haut-Rhin department in Alsace in north-eastern France.

== Population ==
Historical population
Year	Pop.	±% p.a.
1968	340	—
1975	314	−1.13%
1982	342	+1.23%
1990	374	+1.12%
1999	436	+1.72%
2007	540	+2.71%
2012	666	+4.28%
2017	693	+0.80%
2023	652	−1.01%
Source: INSEE

== See also ==
- Communes of the Haut-Rhin department
