= Bellemagny =

Commune in Grand Est, France

- Commune
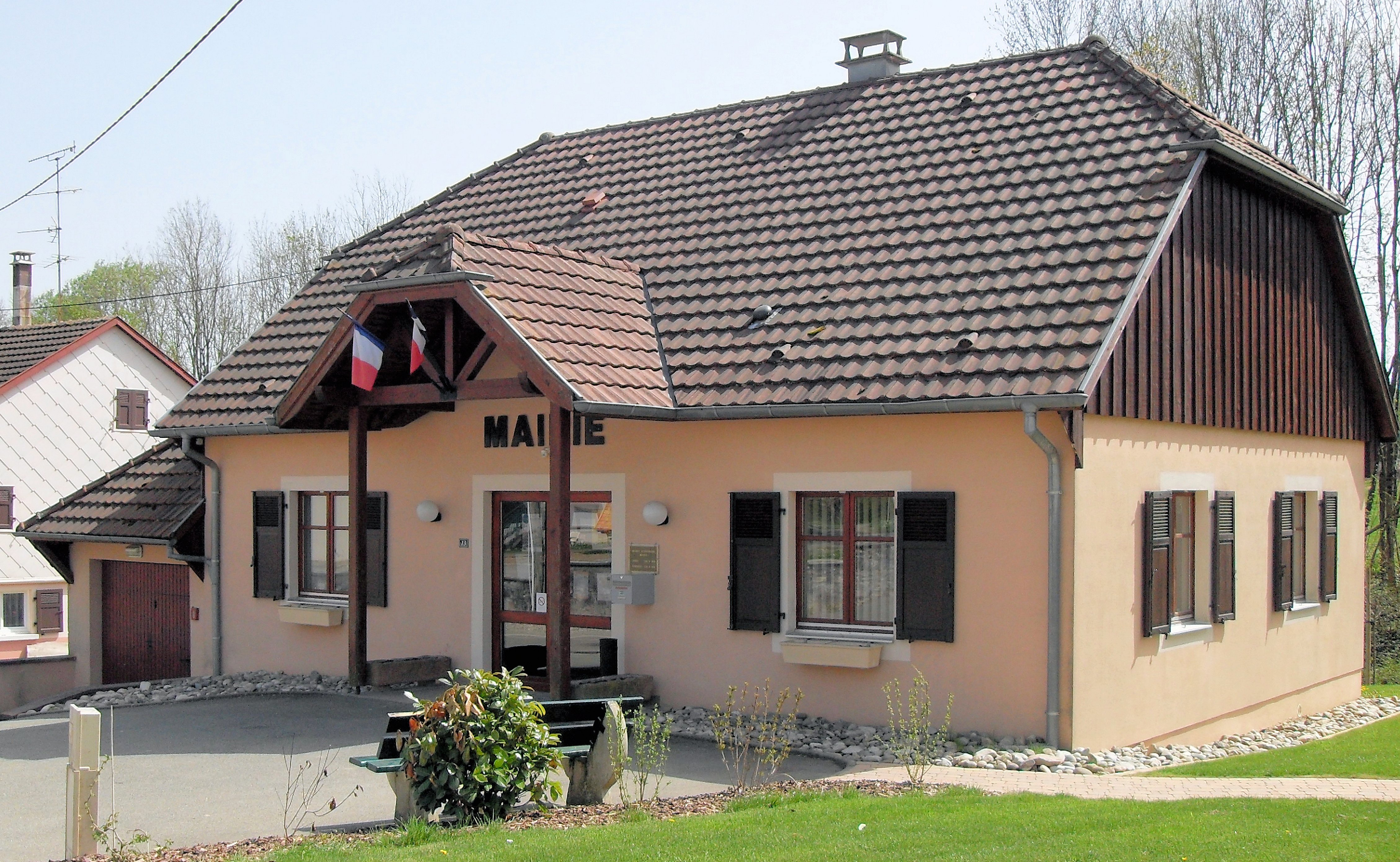
- The town hall in Bellemagny

- Coat of arms
- Location of Bellemagny
- Location within France Location within Grand Est
- Coordinates: 47°41′26″N 7°04′05″E
- Country: France
- Region: Grand Est
- Department: Haut-Rhin
- Arrondissement: Altkirch
- Canton: Masevaux-Niederbruck

Government
  - Mayor (2020–2026): Christian Bilger
- Area^{1}: 2.1 km^{2} (0.81 sq mi)
- Elevation: 340 m (1,120 ft)
- Highest elevation: 397 m (1,302 ft)
- Lowest elevation: 320 m (1,050 ft)
- Population (2023): 147
  - Density: 70/km^{2} (180/sq mi)
- Time zone: UTC+01:00 (CET)
  - Summer (DST): UTC+02:00 (CEST)
- INSEE/Postal code: 68024 /68210
- ^{1} French Land Register data, which excludes lakes, ponds, glaciers > 1 km^{2} (0.386 sq mi or 247 acres) and river estuaries.

Bellemagny (French pronunciation: [bɛlmaɲi]; German: Baronsweiler; Alsatian: Baretswiller) is a commune in the Haut-Rhin department in Alsace in north-eastern France.

== See also ==
- Communes of the Haut-Rhin department
