= Canton of Masevaux-Niederbruck =

Coordinates: 47.77°N 7.00°E

The canton of Masevaux-Niederbruck (before 2021: Masevaux) is an administrative division of the Haut-Rhin department, northeastern France. Its borders were modified at the French canton reorganisation which came into effect in March 2015. Its seat is in Masevaux-Niederbruck.

It consists of the following communes:

1. Altenach
2. Ballersdorf
3. Balschwiller
4. Bellemagny
5. Bernwiller
6. Bréchaumont
7. Bretten
8. Buethwiller
9. Burnhaupt-le-Bas
10. Burnhaupt-le-Haut
11. Chavannes-sur-l'Étang
12. Dannemarie
13. Diefmatten
14. Dolleren
15. Eglingen
16. Elbach
17. Eteimbes
18. Falkwiller
19. Friesen
20. Fulleren
21. Gildwiller
22. Gommersdorf
23. Guevenatten
24. Guewenheim
25. Hagenbach
26. Le Haut-Soultzbach
27. Hecken
28. Hindlingen
29. Kirchberg
30. Largitzen
31. Lauw
32. Magny
33. Manspach
34. Masevaux-Niederbruck
35. Mertzen
36. Montreux-Jeune
37. Montreux-Vieux
38. Mooslargue
39. Oberbruck
40. Pfetterhouse
41. Retzwiller
42. Rimbach-près-Masevaux
43. Romagny
44. Saint-Cosme
45. Saint-Ulrich
46. Sentheim
47. Seppois-le-Bas
48. Seppois-le-Haut
49. Sewen
50. Sickert
51. Soppe-le-Bas
52. Sternenberg
53. Strueth
54. Traubach-le-Bas
55. Traubach-le-Haut
56. Ueberstrass
57. Valdieu-Lutran
58. Wegscheid
59. Wolfersdorf
