= Saint-Ulrich =

Commune in Grand Est, France

- Commune
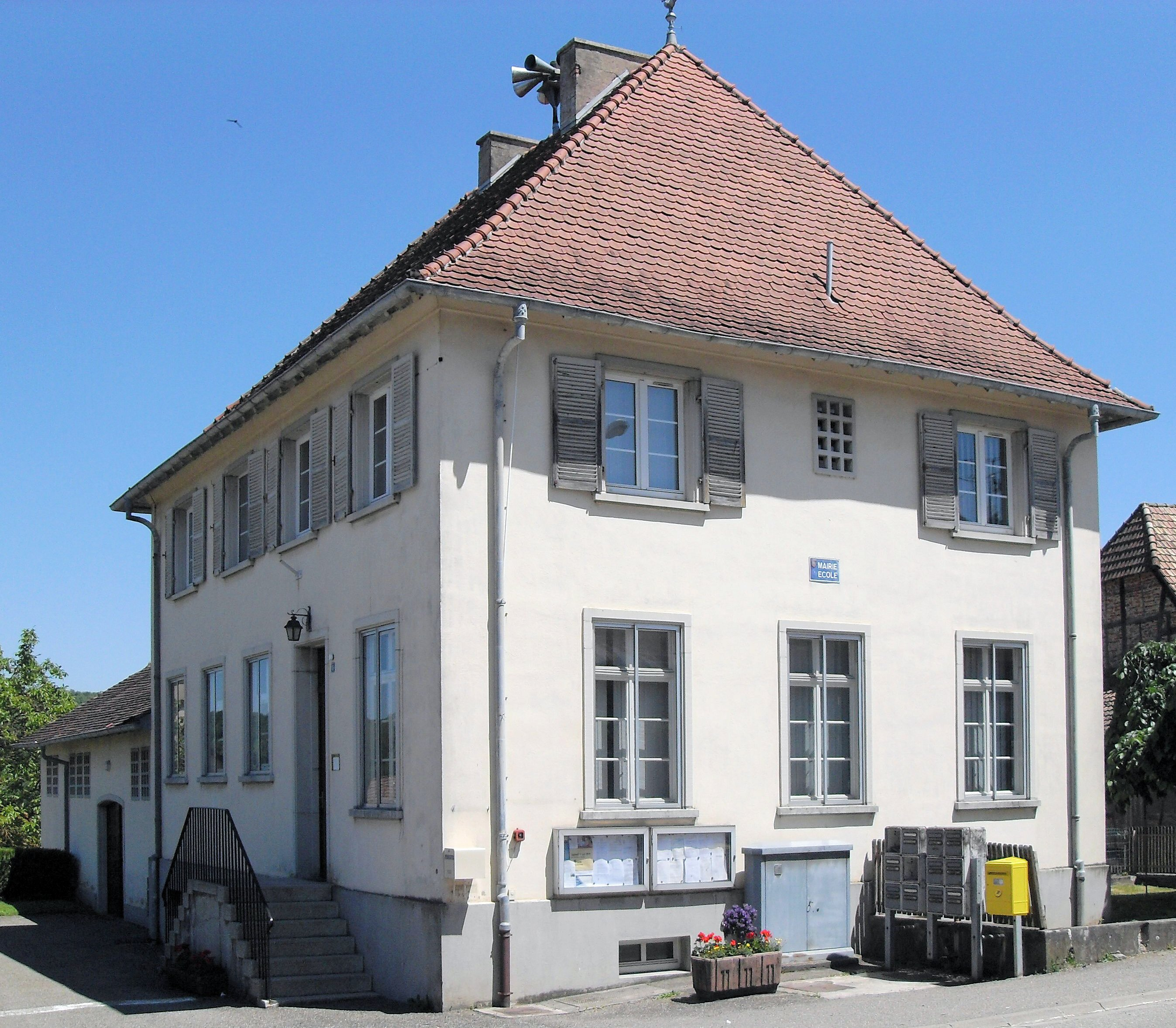
- The town hall and school in Saint-Ulrich

- Coat of arms
- Location of Saint-Ulrich
- Location within France Location within Grand Est
- Coordinates: 47°35′47″N 7°07′13″E
- Country: France
- Region: Grand Est
- Department: Haut-Rhin
- Arrondissement: Altkirch
- Canton: Masevaux-Niederbruck

Government
  - Mayor (2020–2026): Marc Parent
- Area^{1}: 3.85 km^{2} (1.49 sq mi)
- Elevation: 340 m (1,120 ft)
- Highest elevation: 390 m (1,280 ft)
- Lowest elevation: 322 m (1,056 ft)
- Population (2023): 299
  - Density: 77.7/km^{2} (201/sq mi)
- Time zone: UTC+01:00 (CET)
  - Summer (DST): UTC+02:00 (CEST)
- INSEE/Postal code: 68299 /68210
- ^{1} French Land Register data, which excludes lakes, ponds, glaciers > 1 km^{2} (0.386 sq mi or 247 acres) and river estuaries.

Saint-Ulrich (German: Sankt Ulrich) is a commune in the Haut-Rhin department in Alsace in north-eastern France.

== See also ==
- Communes of the Haut-Rhin department
