= Ueberstrass =

Commune in Grand Est, France

Ueberstrass Íwerstrooss
- Commune
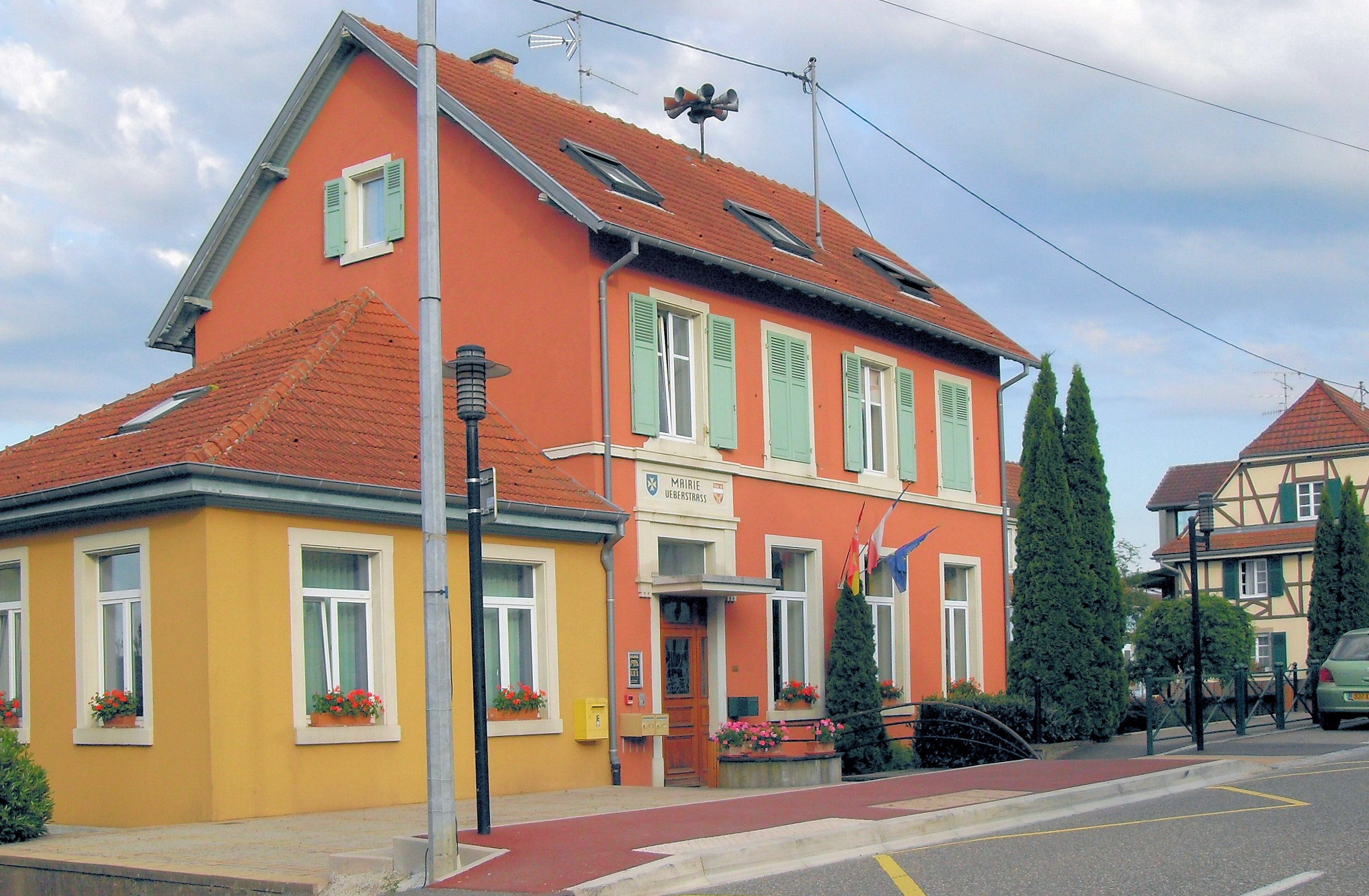
- The town hall in Ueberstrass

- Coat of arms
- Location of Ueberstrass
- Location within France Location within Grand Est
- Coordinates: 47°33′11″N 7°09′32″E
- Country: France
- Region: Grand Est
- Department: Haut-Rhin
- Arrondissement: Altkirch
- Canton: Masevaux-Niederbruck
- Intercommunality: Sud Alsace Largue

Government
  - Mayor (2020–2026): Marie-Cécile Ley
- Area^{1}: 5.12 km^{2} (1.98 sq mi)
- Elevation: 370 m (1,210 ft)
- Highest elevation: 427 m (1,401 ft)
- Lowest elevation: 354 m (1,161 ft)
- Population (2023): 333
  - Density: 65.0/km^{2} (168/sq mi)
- Time zone: UTC+01:00 (CET)
  - Summer (DST): UTC+02:00 (CEST)
- INSEE/Postal code: 68340 /68580
- ^{1} French Land Register data, which excludes lakes, ponds, glaciers > 1 km^{2} (0.386 sq mi or 247 acres) and river estuaries.

Ueberstrass (Alemannic German: Íwerstrooss; German: Überstrass) is a commune in the Haut-Rhin department in Alsace in north-eastern France.

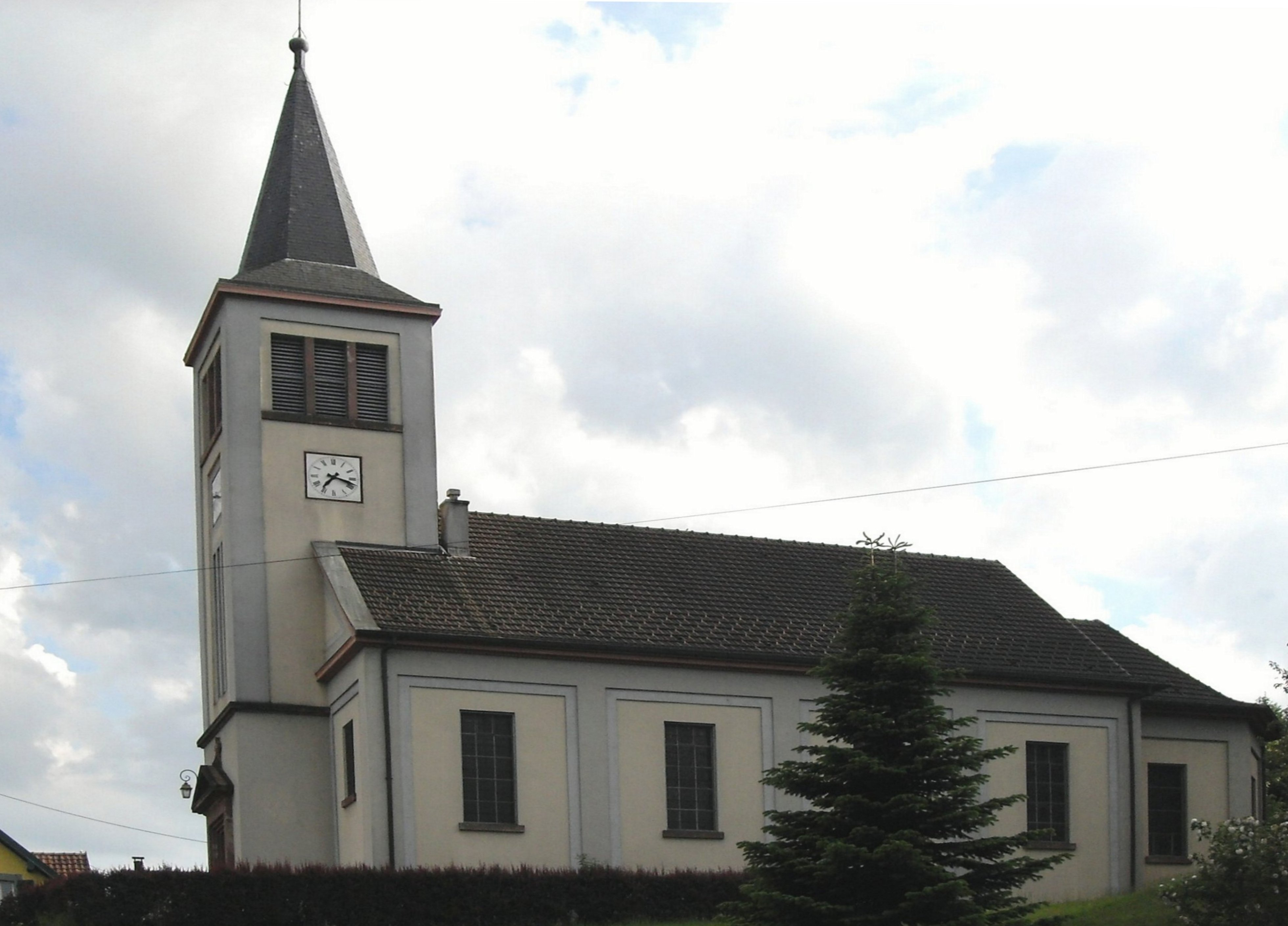
Sainte-Thérèse-de-l'enfant-Jésus Church

== Population ==
Historical population
| Year | Pop. | ±% p.a. |
|---|---|---|
| 1968 | 271 | — |
| 1975 | 274 | +0.16% |
| 1982 | 285 | +0.56% |
| 1990 | 313 | +1.18% |
| 1999 | 312 | −0.04% |
| 2007 | 348 | +1.37% |
| 2012 | 368 | +1.12% |
| 2017 | 375 | +0.38% |
| 2023 | 333 | −1.96% |
Source: INSEE

== See also ==
- Communes of the Haut-Rhin department
