= Traubach-le-Haut =

Commune in Grand Est, France

- Commune
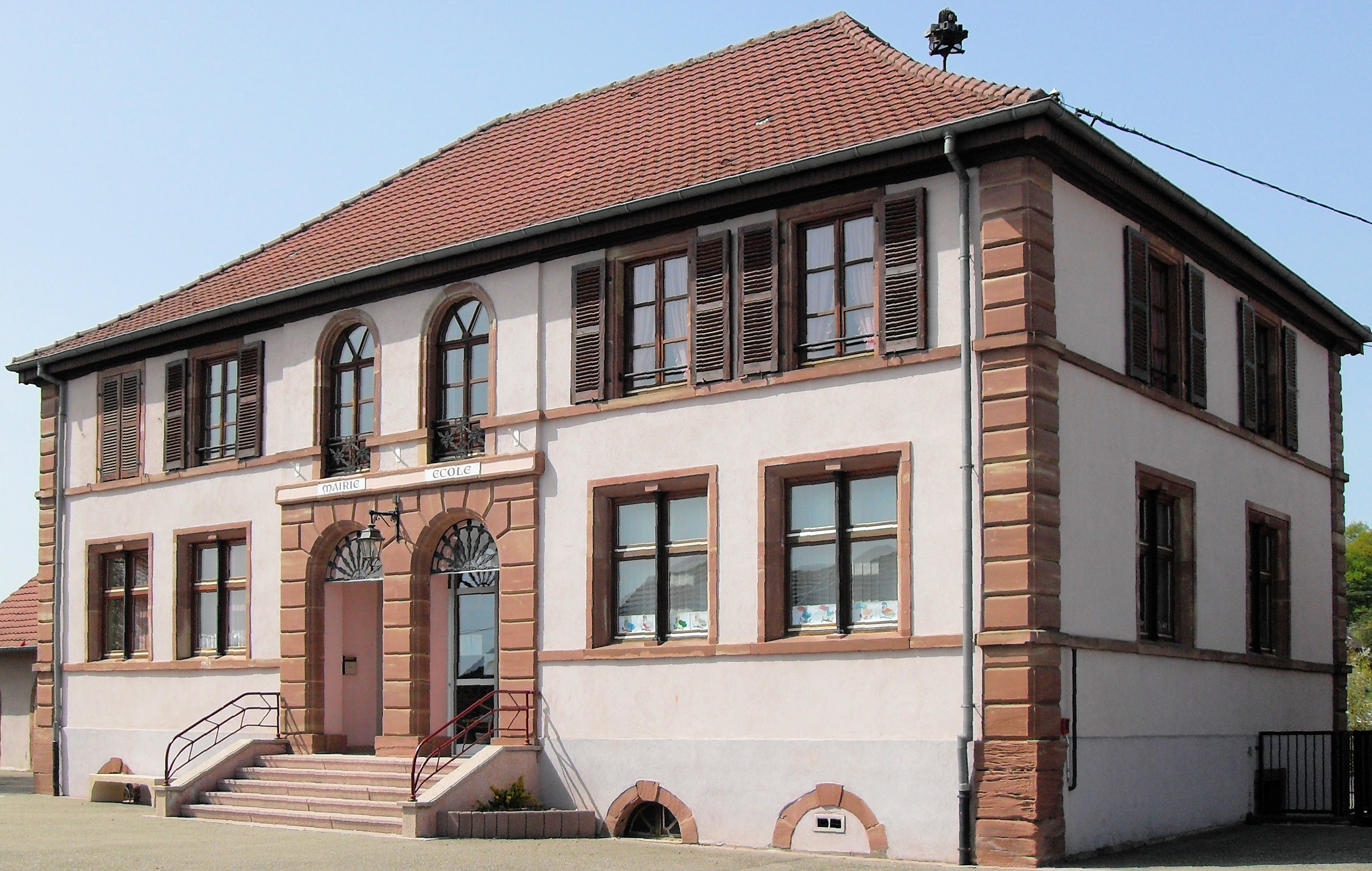
- The town hall and school in Traubach-le-Haut

- Coat of arms
- Location of Traubach-le-Haut
- Location within France Location within Grand Est
- Coordinates: 47°40′15″N 7°05′31″E
- Country: France
- Region: Grand Est
- Department: Haut-Rhin
- Arrondissement: Altkirch
- Canton: Masevaux-Niederbruck

Government
  - Mayor (2020–2026): Pierre Rinner
- Area^{1}: 6.91 km^{2} (2.67 sq mi)
- Elevation: 314 m (1,030 ft)
- Highest elevation: 372 m (1,220 ft)
- Lowest elevation: 289 m (948 ft)
- Population (2023): 647
  - Density: 93.6/km^{2} (243/sq mi)
- Time zone: UTC+01:00 (CET)
  - Summer (DST): UTC+02:00 (CEST)
- INSEE/Postal code: 68337 /68210
- ^{1} French Land Register data, which excludes lakes, ponds, glaciers > 1 km^{2} (0.386 sq mi or 247 acres) and river estuaries.

Traubach-le-Haut (German: Obertraubach) is a commune in the Haut-Rhin department in Alsace in north-eastern France.

== See also ==
- Communes of the Haut-Rhin department
