= Hecken, Haut-Rhin =

Commune in Grand Est, France

Hecken Hecke
- Commune
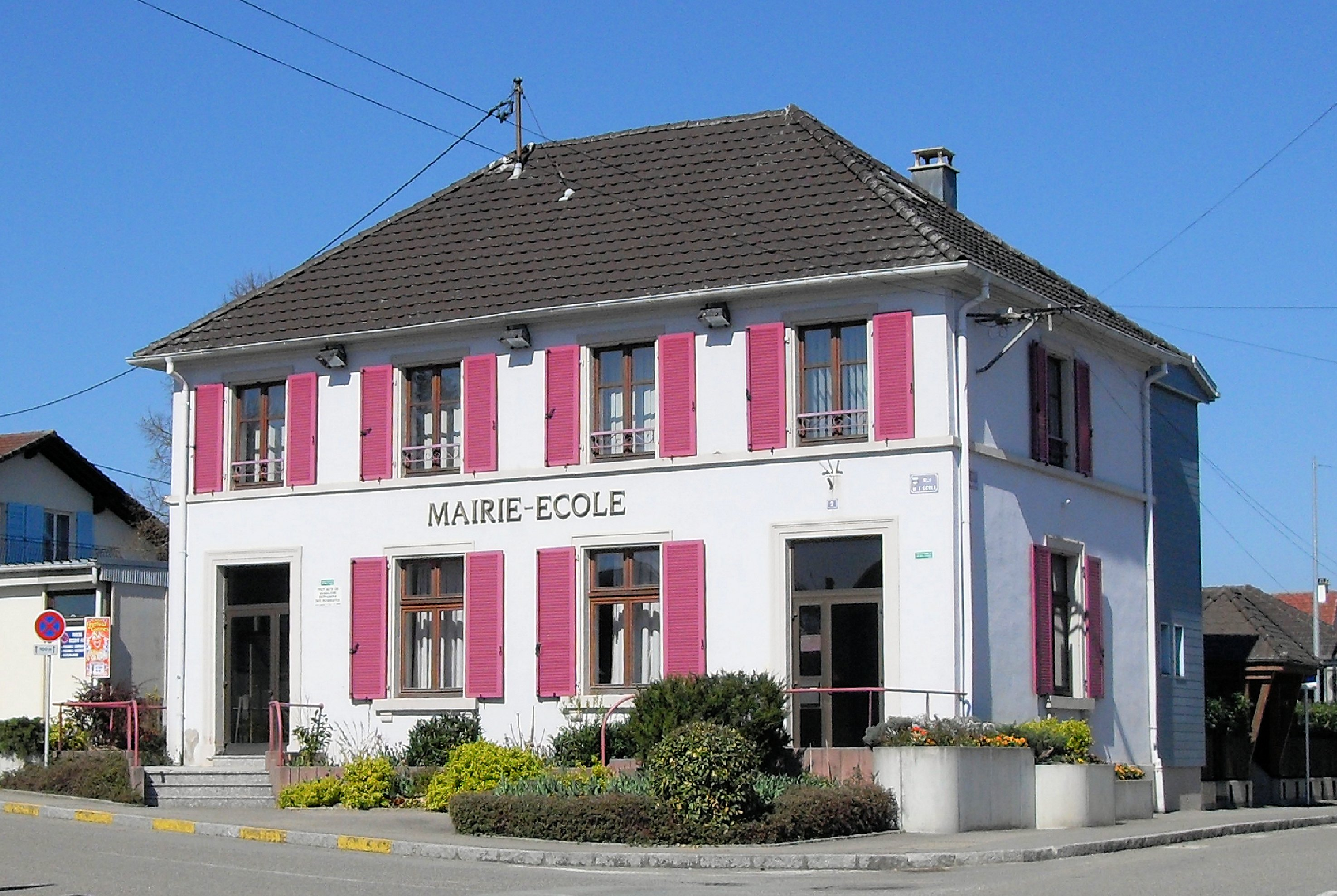
- The town hall and school in Hecken

- Coat of arms
- Location of Hecken
- Location within France Location within Grand Est
- Coordinates: 47°41′34″N 7°07′32″E
- Country: France
- Region: Grand Est
- Department: Haut-Rhin
- Arrondissement: Altkirch
- Canton: Masevaux-Niederbruck

Government
  - Mayor (2020–2026): Claude Gentzbittel
- Area^{1}: 2.45 km^{2} (0.95 sq mi)
- Elevation: 300 m (980 ft)
- Highest elevation: 320 m (1,050 ft)
- Lowest elevation: 293 m (961 ft)
- Population (2023): 527
  - Density: 215/km^{2} (557/sq mi)
- Time zone: UTC+01:00 (CET)
  - Summer (DST): UTC+02:00 (CEST)
- INSEE/Postal code: 68125 /68210
- ^{1} French Land Register data, which excludes lakes, ponds, glaciers > 1 km^{2} (0.386 sq mi or 247 acres) and river estuaries.

Hecken (French pronunciation: [ɛkən]; Alsatian: Hecke) is a commune in the Haut-Rhin department in Alsace in north-eastern France.

== See also ==
- Communes of the Haut-Rhin département
