= Diefmatten =

Commune in Grand Est, France

- Commune
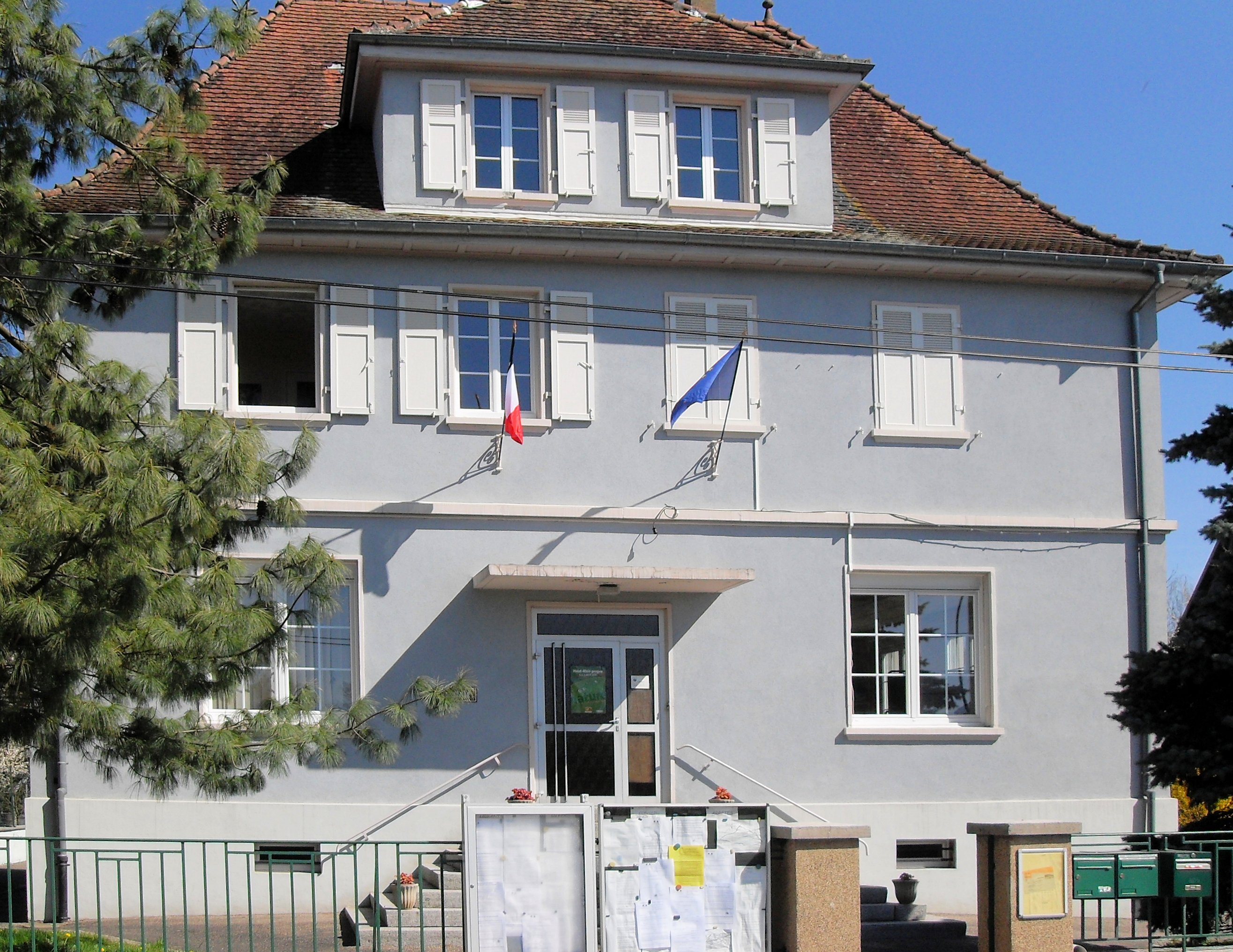
- The town hall and school in Diefmatten

- Coat of arms
- Location of Diefmatten
- Location within France Location within Grand Est
- Coordinates: 47°42′30″N 7°06′59″E
- Country: France
- Region: Grand Est
- Department: Haut-Rhin
- Arrondissement: Altkirch
- Canton: Masevaux-Niederbruck

Government
  - Mayor (2020–2026): Alain Gessier
- Area^{1}: 3.17 km^{2} (1.22 sq mi)
- Elevation: 300 m (980 ft)
- Highest elevation: 381 m (1,250 ft)
- Lowest elevation: 297 m (974 ft)
- Population (2023): 307
  - Density: 96.8/km^{2} (251/sq mi)
- Time zone: UTC+01:00 (CET)
  - Summer (DST): UTC+02:00 (CEST)
- INSEE/Postal code: 68071 /68780
- ^{1} French Land Register data, which excludes lakes, ponds, glaciers > 1 km^{2} (0.386 sq mi or 247 acres) and river estuaries.

Diefmatten (French pronunciation: [difmatən]) is a commune in the Haut-Rhin department in Alsace in north-eastern France.

It is about 15 km west of Mulhouse.

== See also ==
- Communes of the Haut-Rhin department
