= Elbach =

Commune in Grand Est, France

- Commune
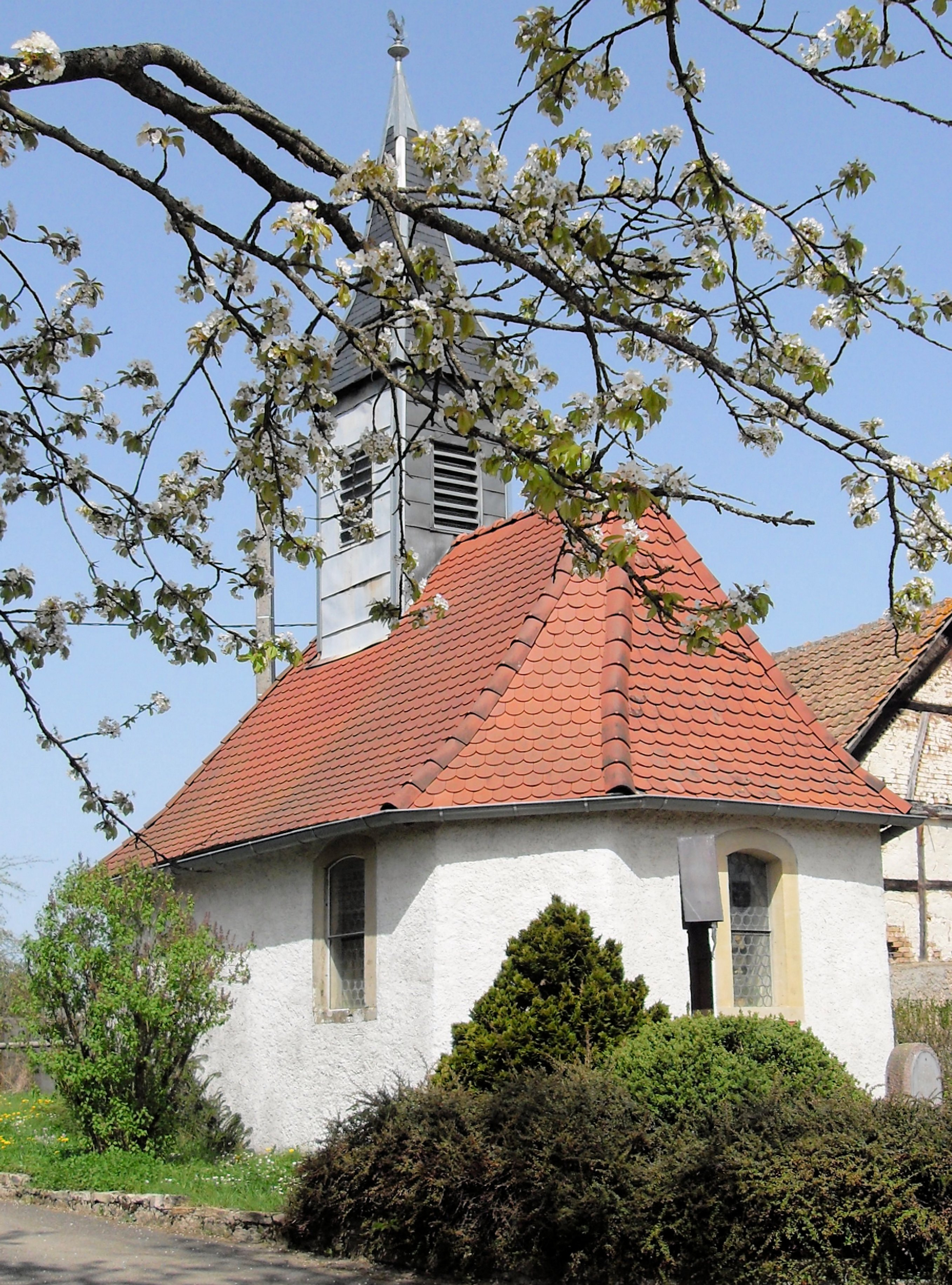
- The chapel of Saint-Pierre et Saint-Paul in Elbach

- Coat of arms
- Location of Elbach
- Location within France Location within Grand Est
- Coordinates: 47°38′30″N 7°04′47″E
- Country: France
- Region: Grand Est
- Department: Haut-Rhin
- Arrondissement: Altkirch
- Canton: Masevaux-Niederbruck

Government
  - Mayor (2020–2026): Emmanuel Schacherer
- Area^{1}: 3.18 km^{2} (1.23 sq mi)
- Elevation: 320 m (1,050 ft)
- Highest elevation: 370 m (1,210 ft)
- Lowest elevation: 309 m (1,014 ft)
- Population (2023): 277
  - Density: 87.1/km^{2} (226/sq mi)
- Time zone: UTC+01:00 (CET)
  - Summer (DST): UTC+02:00 (CEST)
- INSEE/Postal code: 68079 /68210
- ^{1} French Land Register data, which excludes lakes, ponds, glaciers > 1 km^{2} (0.386 sq mi or 247 acres) and river estuaries.

Elbach is a commune in the Haut-Rhin department in Alsace in north-eastern France.

== See also ==
- Communes of the Haut-Rhin département
