= Eteimbes =

- Commune
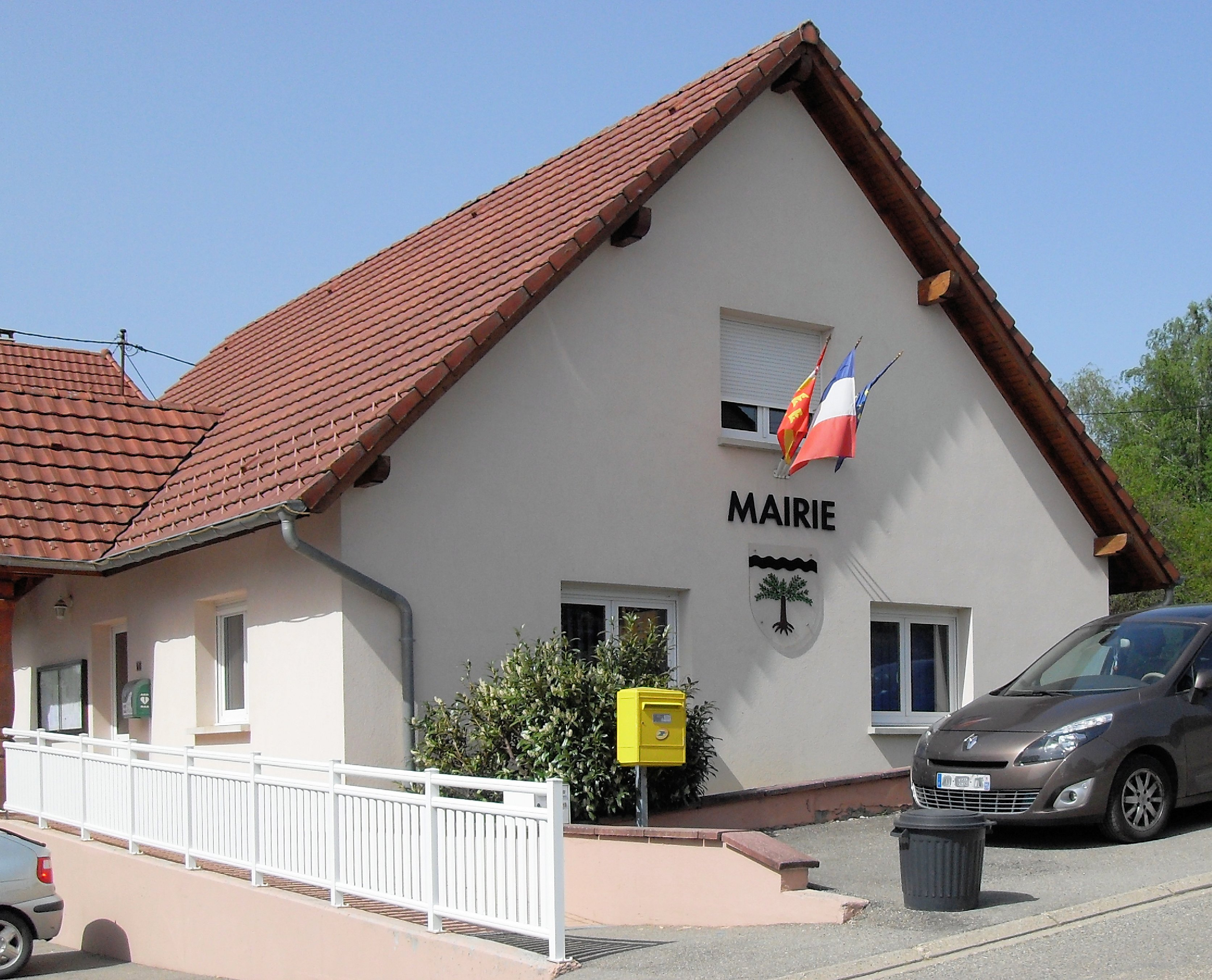
- The town hall in Eteimbes

- Coat of arms
- Location of Eteimbes
- Location within France Location within Grand Est
- Coordinates: 47°42′13″N 7°03′01″E
- Country: France
- Region: Grand Est
- Department: Haut-Rhin
- Arrondissement: Altkirch
- Canton: Masevaux-Niederbruck
- Intercommunality: Sud Alsace Largue

Government
  - Mayor (2020–2026): Yves Conrad
- Area^{1}: 4.96 km^{2} (1.92 sq mi)
- Elevation: 370 m (1,210 ft)
- Highest elevation: 412 m (1,352 ft)
- Lowest elevation: 340 m (1,120 ft)
- Population (2023): 405
  - Density: 81.7/km^{2} (211/sq mi)
- Time zone: UTC+01:00 (CET)
  - Summer (DST): UTC+02:00 (CEST)
- INSEE/Postal code: 68085 /68210
- ^{1} French Land Register data, which excludes lakes, ponds, glaciers > 1 km^{2} (0.386 sq mi or 247 acres) and river estuaries.

Eteimbes (French pronunciation: [etɛ̃b]; German: Welschsteinbach) is a commune in the Haut-Rhin department in Alsace in north-eastern France.

== Population ==
Historical population
Year	Pop.	±% p.a.
1968	105	—
1975	123	+2.29%
1982	148	+2.68%
1990	232	+5.78%
1999	280	+2.11%
2007	306	+1.12%
2012	379	+4.37%
2017	380	+0.05%
2023	405	+1.07%
Source: INSEE

== See also ==
- Communes of the Haut-Rhin département
