= Saint-Cosme =

Commune in Grand Est, France

- Commune
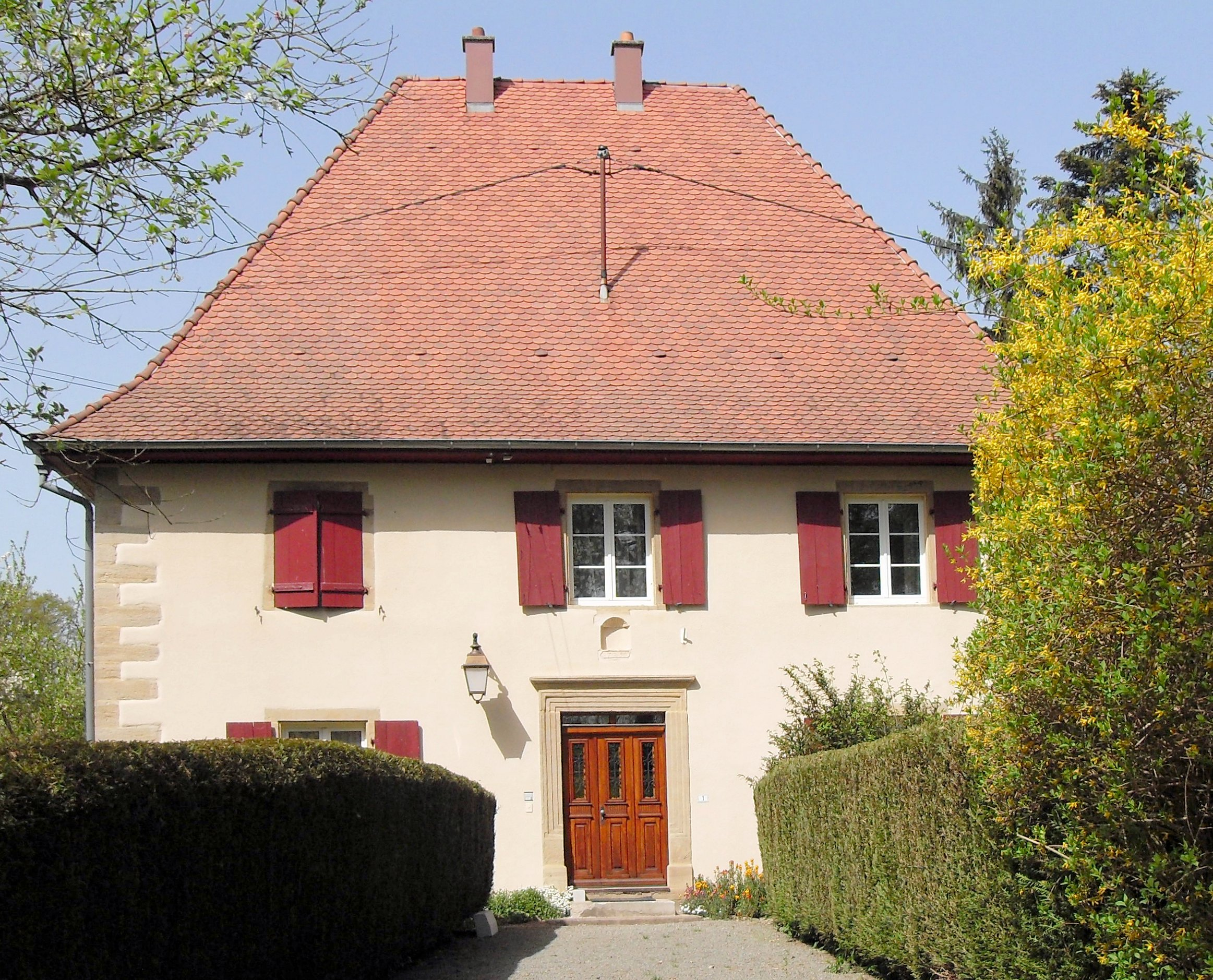
- The town hall in Saint-Cosme

- Coat of arms
- Location of Saint-Cosme
- Location within France Location within Grand Est
- Coordinates: 47°40′57″N 7°03′50″E
- Country: France
- Region: Grand Est
- Department: Haut-Rhin
- Arrondissement: Altkirch
- Canton: Masevaux-Niederbruck

Government
  - Mayor (2020–2026): Joël Wies
- Area^{1}: 2.71 km^{2} (1.05 sq mi)
- Elevation: 355 m (1,165 ft)
- Highest elevation: 391 m (1,283 ft)
- Lowest elevation: 319 m (1,047 ft)
- Population (2023): 75
  - Density: 28/km^{2} (72/sq mi)
- Time zone: UTC+01:00 (CET)
  - Summer (DST): UTC+02:00 (CEST)
- INSEE/Postal code: 68293 /68210
- ^{1} French Land Register data, which excludes lakes, ponds, glaciers > 1 km^{2} (0.386 sq mi or 247 acres) and river estuaries.

Saint-Cosme (French pronunciation: [sɛ̃ kom]; German: Sanct Cosmann) is a commune in the Haut-Rhin department in Alsace in north-eastern France.

== See also ==
- Communes of the Haut-Rhin department
