= Montreux-Jeune =

Commune in Grand Est, France

- Commune
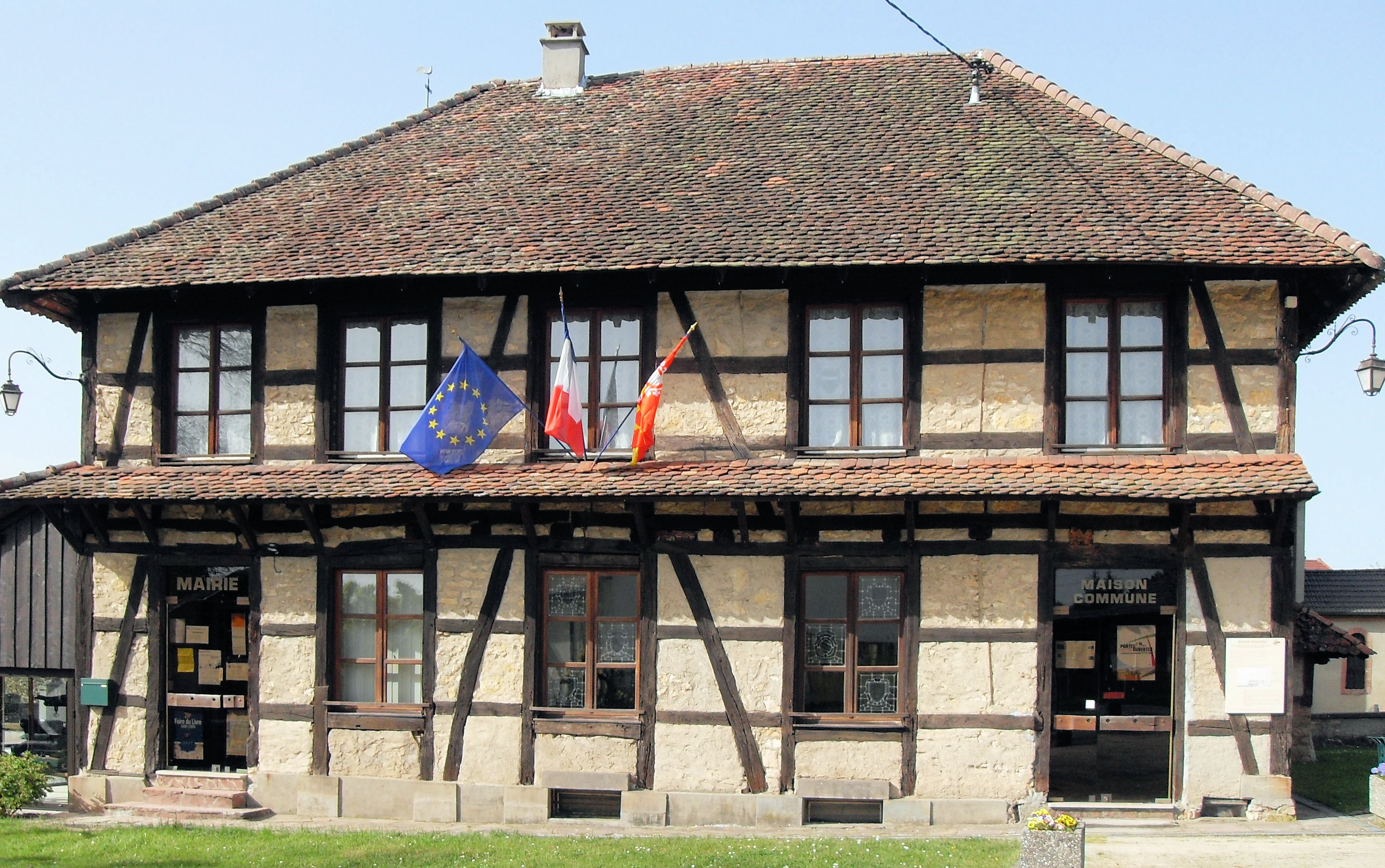
- The town hall in Montreux-Jeune

- Coat of arms
- Location of Montreux-Jeune
- Location within France Location within Grand Est
- Coordinates: 47°36′41″N 7°01′58″E
- Country: France
- Region: Grand Est
- Department: Haut-Rhin
- Arrondissement: Altkirch
- Canton: Masevaux-Niederbruck

Government
  - Mayor (2020–2026): Michel Herrgott
- Area^{1}: 3.36 km^{2} (1.30 sq mi)
- Elevation: 360 m (1,180 ft)
- Highest elevation: 377 m (1,237 ft)
- Lowest elevation: 338 m (1,109 ft)
- Population (2023): 368
  - Density: 110/km^{2} (284/sq mi)
- Time zone: UTC+01:00 (CET)
  - Summer (DST): UTC+02:00 (CEST)
- INSEE/Postal code: 68214 /68210
- ^{1} French Land Register data, which excludes lakes, ponds, glaciers > 1 km^{2} (0.386 sq mi or 247 acres) and river estuaries.

Montreux-Jeune (French pronunciation: [mɔ̃tʁø ʒœn]; German: Jungmünsterol; Alsatian: Jungmìnschtràl) is a commune in the Haut-Rhin department in Alsace in north-eastern France.

== See also ==
- Communes of the Haut-Rhin département
