= Bréchaumont =

Commune in Grand Est, France

- Commune
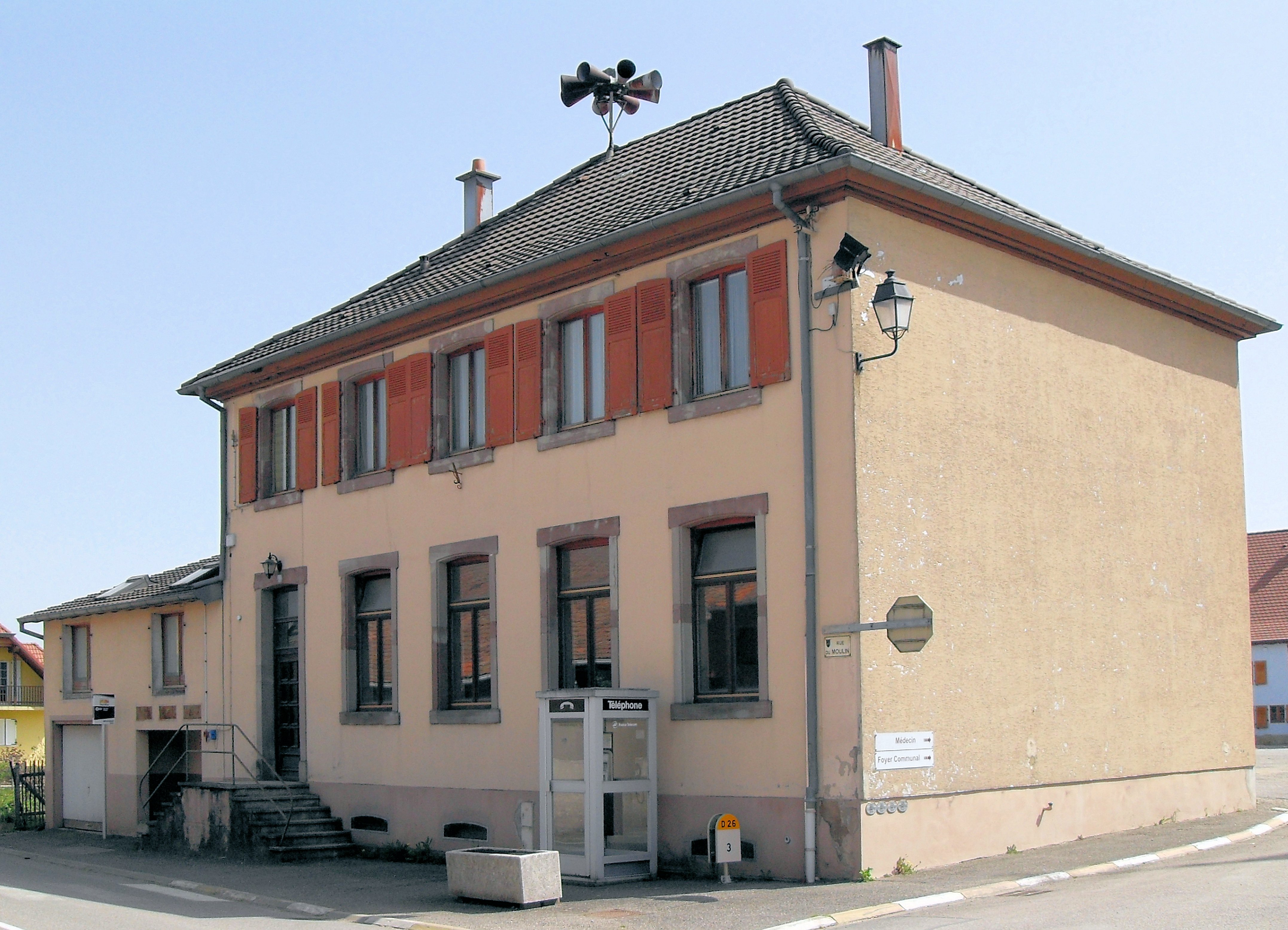
- The town hall in Bréchaumont

- Coat of arms
- Location of Bréchaumont
- Location within France Location within Grand Est
- Coordinates: 47°40′11″N 7°04′18″E
- Country: France
- Region: Grand Est
- Department: Haut-Rhin
- Arrondissement: Altkirch
- Canton: Masevaux-Niederbruck

Government
  - Mayor (2020–2026): Franck Guittard
- Area^{1}: 6.51 km^{2} (2.51 sq mi)
- Elevation: 348 m (1,142 ft)
- Highest elevation: 396 m (1,299 ft)
- Lowest elevation: 307 m (1,007 ft)
- Population (2023): 407
  - Density: 62.5/km^{2} (162/sq mi)
- Time zone: UTC+01:00 (CET)
  - Summer (DST): UTC+02:00 (CEST)
- INSEE/Postal code: 68050 /68210
- ^{1} French Land Register data, which excludes lakes, ponds, glaciers > 1 km^{2} (0.386 sq mi or 247 acres) and river estuaries.

Bréchaumont (French pronunciation: [bʁeʃomɔ̃]; German: Brückensweiler; Alsatian: Bruckedswiller) is a commune in the Haut-Rhin department in Alsace in north-eastern France.

== See also ==
- Communes of the Haut-Rhin department
