= Hindlingen =

Commune in Grand Est, France

- Commune
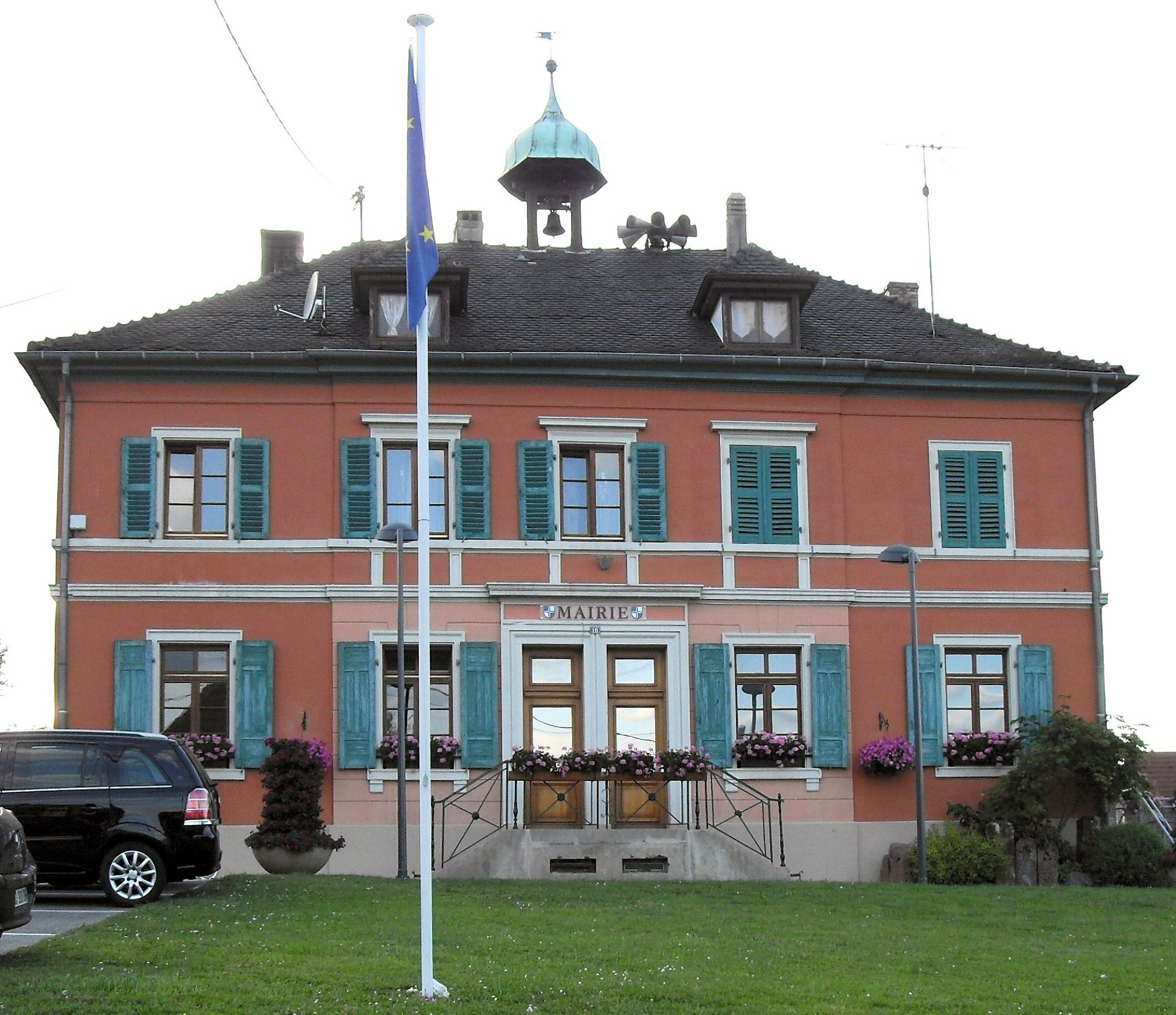
- The town hall in Hindlingen

- Coat of arms
- Location of Hindlingen
- Location within France Location within Grand Est
- Coordinates: 47°34′21″N 7°08′17″E
- Country: France
- Region: Grand Est
- Department: Haut-Rhin
- Arrondissement: Altkirch
- Canton: Masevaux-Niederbruck

Government
  - Mayor (2021–2026): Dominique Brunner
- Area^{1}: 8 km^{2} (3.1 sq mi)
- Elevation: 360 m (1,180 ft)
- Highest elevation: 417 m (1,368 ft)
- Lowest elevation: 339 m (1,112 ft)
- Population (2023): 646
  - Density: 81/km^{2} (210/sq mi)
- Time zone: UTC+01:00 (CET)
  - Summer (DST): UTC+02:00 (CEST)
- INSEE/Postal code: 68137 /68580
- ^{1} French Land Register data, which excludes lakes, ponds, glaciers > 1 km^{2} (0.386 sq mi or 247 acres) and river estuaries.

Hindlingen (French pronunciation: [indliŋ(ɡ)ən]; Alsatian: Hìndlìnge) is a commune in the Haut-Rhin department in Alsace in north-eastern France.

== See also ==
- Communes of the Haut-Rhin département
