= Mooslargue =

Commune in Grand Est, France

- Commune
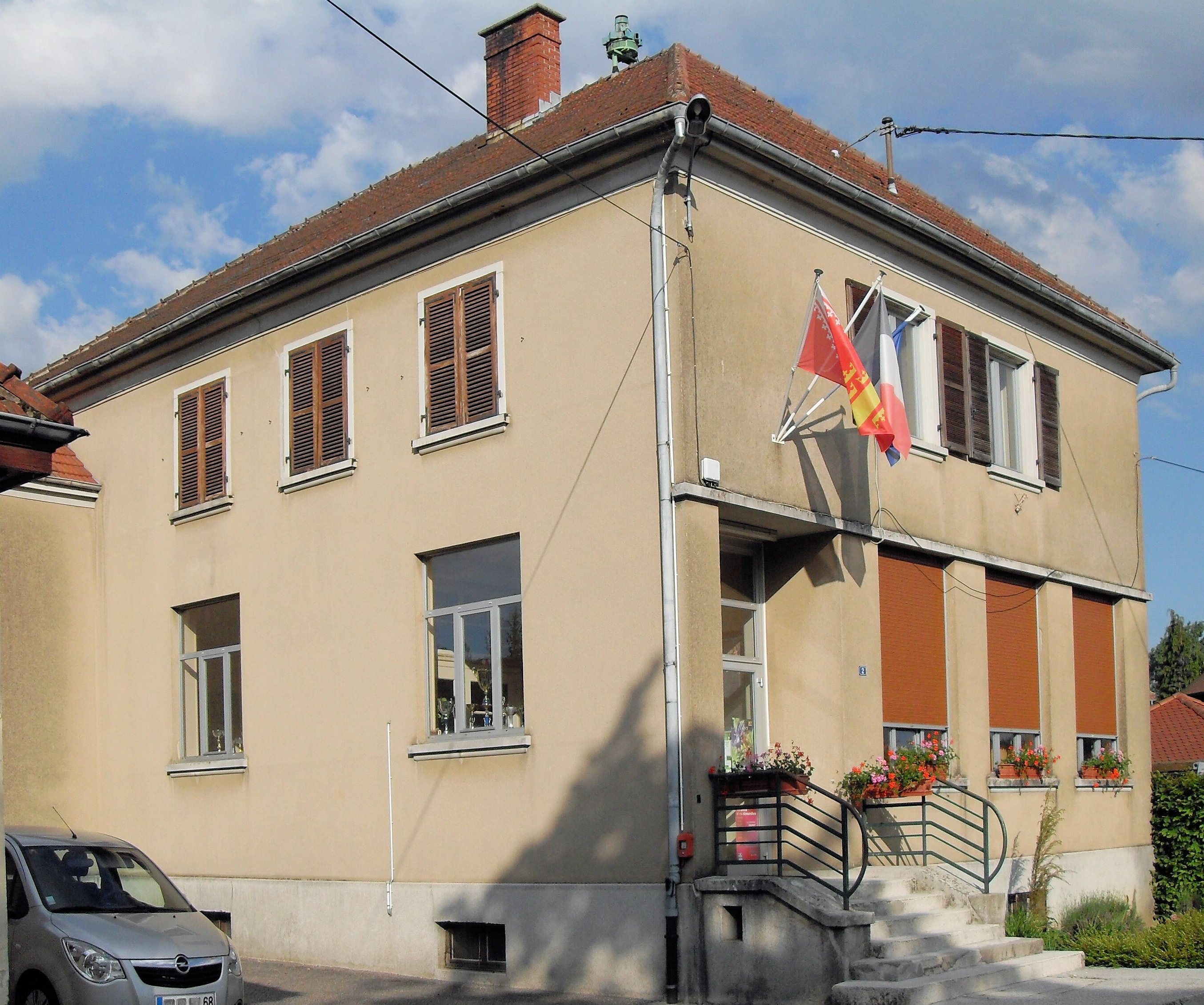
- The town hall in Mooslargue

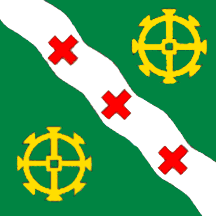
- Flag Coat of arms
- Location of Mooslargue
- Location within France Location within Grand Est
- Coordinates: 47°30′37″N 7°13′08″E
- Country: France
- Region: Grand Est
- Department: Haut-Rhin
- Arrondissement: Altkirch
- Canton: Masevaux-Niederbruck

Government
  - Mayor (2020–2026): Pascal Sommerhalter
- Area^{1}: 5.63 km^{2} (2.17 sq mi)
- Elevation: 425 m (1,394 ft)
- Highest elevation: 462 m (1,516 ft)
- Lowest elevation: 396 m (1,299 ft)
- Population (2023): 401
  - Density: 71.2/km^{2} (184/sq mi)
- Time zone: UTC+01:00 (CET)
  - Summer (DST): UTC+02:00 (CEST)
- INSEE/Postal code: 68216 /68580
- ^{1} French Land Register data, which excludes lakes, ponds, glaciers > 1 km^{2} (0.386 sq mi or 247 acres) and river estuaries.

Mooslargue (French pronunciation: [moslaʁg]; German: Mooslarg; Alsatian: Moos-Neederlàrg) is a commune in the Haut-Rhin department, in Alsace in north-eastern France.

== See also ==
- Communes of the Haut-Rhin département
