= Manspach =

Commune in Grand Est, France

- Commune
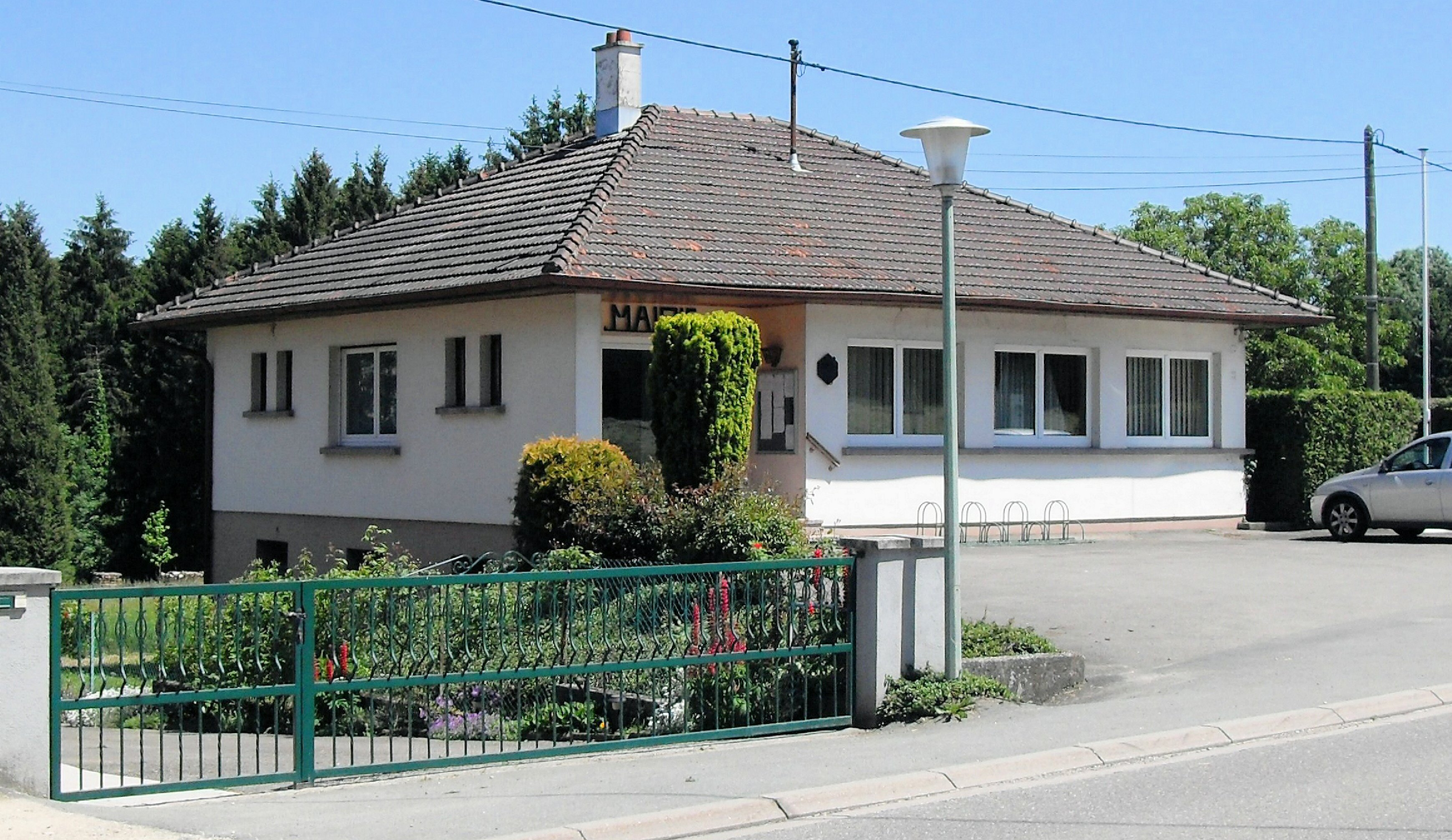
- The town hall in Manspach

- Coat of arms
- Location of Manspach
- Location within France Location within Grand Est
- Coordinates: 47°37′01″N 7°06′21″E
- Country: France
- Region: Grand Est
- Department: Haut-Rhin
- Arrondissement: Altkirch
- Canton: Masevaux-Niederbruck

Government
  - Mayor (2020–2026): Daniel Dietmann
- Area^{1}: 5.33 km^{2} (2.06 sq mi)
- Elevation: 315 m (1,033 ft)
- Highest elevation: 387 m (1,270 ft)
- Lowest elevation: 304 m (997 ft)
- Population (2023): 544
  - Density: 102/km^{2} (264/sq mi)
- Time zone: UTC+01:00 (CET)
  - Summer (DST): UTC+02:00 (CEST)
- INSEE/Postal code: 68200 /68210
- ^{1} French Land Register data, which excludes lakes, ponds, glaciers > 1 km^{2} (0.386 sq mi or 247 acres) and river estuaries.

Manspach (Alsatian: Mànschbàch) is a commune in the Haut-Rhin department in Alsace in north-eastern France.

== See also ==
- Communes of the Haut-Rhin département
