= Altenach =

Commune in Grand Est, France

- Commune
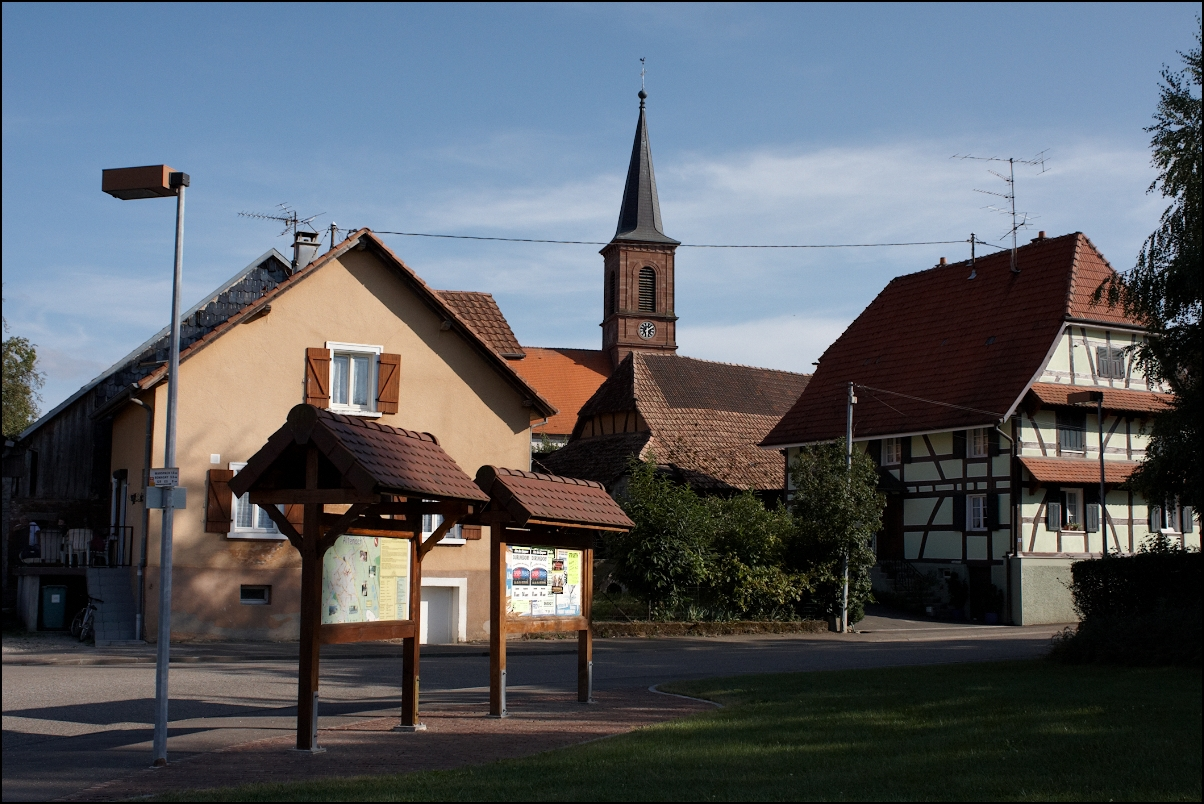
- The church in Altenach

- Coat of arms
- Location of Altenach
- Location within France Location within Grand Est
- Coordinates: 47°36′26″N 7°06′45″E
- Country: France
- Region: Grand Est
- Department: Haut-Rhin
- Arrondissement: Altkirch
- Canton: Masevaux-Niederbruck

Government
  - Mayor (2020–2026): Jean-Luc Lamère
- Area^{1}: 6.18 km^{2} (2.39 sq mi)
- Elevation: 325 m (1,066 ft)
- Highest elevation: 386 m (1,266 ft)
- Lowest elevation: 313 m (1,027 ft)
- Population (2023): 372
  - Density: 60.2/km^{2} (156/sq mi)
- Time zone: UTC+01:00 (CET)
  - Summer (DST): UTC+02:00 (CEST)
- INSEE/Postal code: 68002 /68210
- ^{1} French Land Register data, which excludes lakes, ponds, glaciers > 1 km^{2} (0.386 sq mi or 247 acres) and river estuaries.

Altenach (French pronunciation: [altənak]; Alsatian: Àltanàch) is a commune in the Haut-Rhin department in Alsace in north-eastern France.

== See also ==
- Communes of the Haut-Rhin department
