= Largitzen =

Commune in Grand Est, France

- Commune
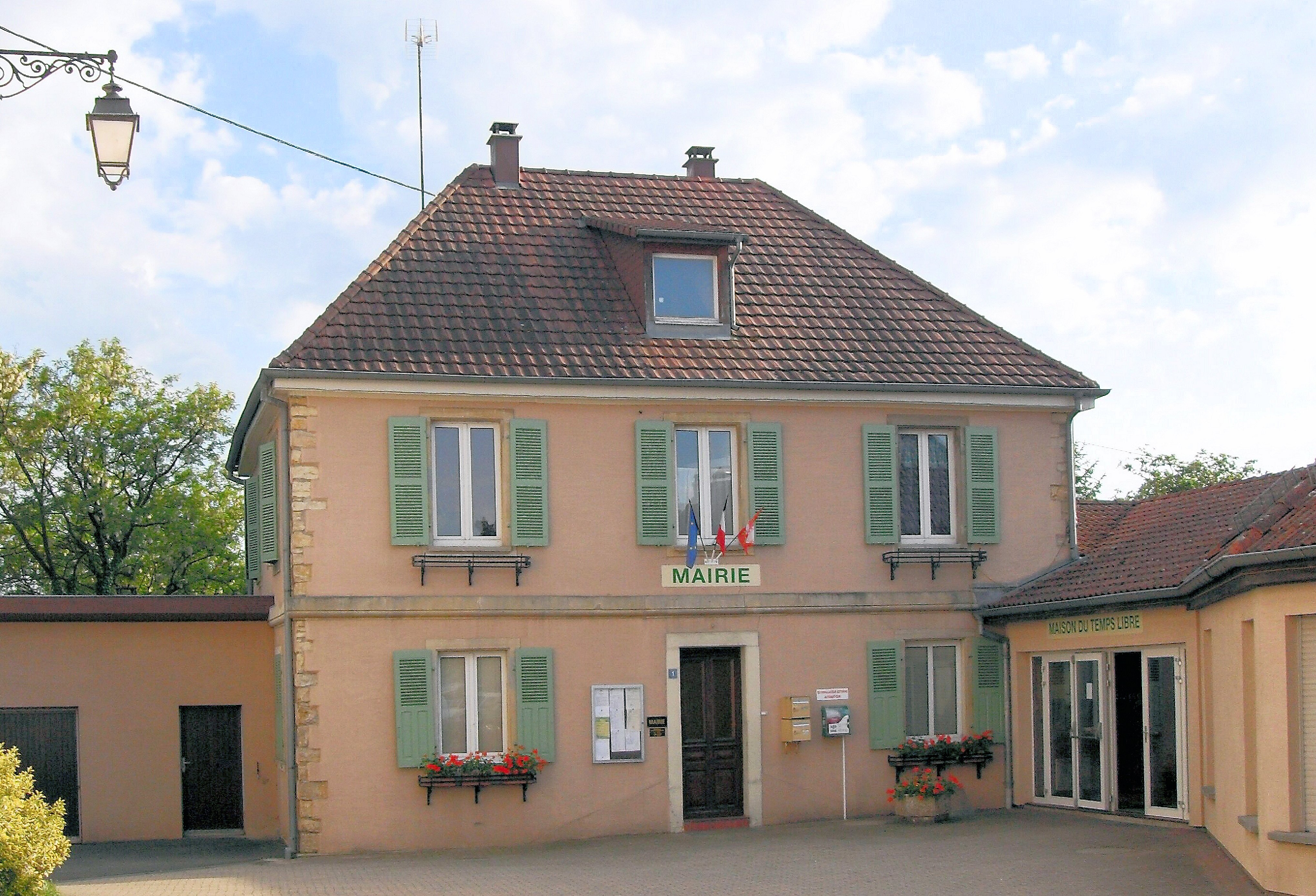
- The town hall in Largitzen

- Coat of arms
- Location of Largitzen
- Location within France Location within Grand Est
- Coordinates: 47°33′46″N 7°11′15″E
- Country: France
- Region: Grand Est
- Department: Haut-Rhin
- Arrondissement: Altkirch
- Canton: Masevaux-Niederbruck

Government
  - Mayor (2020–2026): Jean-Paul Gnaedig
- Area^{1}: 5.6 km^{2} (2.2 sq mi)
- Elevation: 385 m (1,263 ft)
- Highest elevation: 431 m (1,414 ft)
- Lowest elevation: 366 m (1,201 ft)
- Population (2023): 352
  - Density: 63/km^{2} (160/sq mi)
- Time zone: UTC+01:00 (CET)
  - Summer (DST): UTC+02:00 (CEST)
- INSEE/Postal code: 68176 /68580
- ^{1} French Land Register data, which excludes lakes, ponds, glaciers > 1 km^{2} (0.386 sq mi or 247 acres) and river estuaries.

Largitzen (French pronunciation: [laʁɡitsən]; Jurassien: Lairdgie) is a commune in the Haut-Rhin department in Alsace in north-eastern France.

== History ==
In 1914, the front line ran just by Largitzen, placing it in the zone controlled by the German Empire. Separated by only a few kilometers from Largitzen, the neighboring towns of Ueberstrass and Friesen remained French.

The town was almost entirely destroyed during the 1916 bombings. It was progressively rebuilt in 1919 when the Saint-Georges church was restored and the ex-presbytery became the city hall. A memorial representing Saint Georges slaying a dragon stands on the Church Square. Made in 1929 the memorial honors the villagers, both Germans and French, who lost their lives during the war. As an Alsacian village, Largitzen was profoundly affected by the Second World War. The region was occupied by Nazi Germany until the liberation on November 21, 1944.

Visible relics of the war can be found in the form of several bunkers in the woods around the town.

== Geography ==
The river Largitzenbach runs through Largitzen, separating the core of the village from Lufendorf , which used to be independent. Numerous ponds can be found in the nearly 50 km2 of woodland surrounding the village.

== Demography ==
Historical population

| Year | Pop. | ±% p.a. |
|---|---|---|
| 1793 | 345 | — |
| 1821 | 530 | +1.55% |
| 1846 | 431 | −0.82% |
| 1871 | 372 | −0.59% |
| 1900 | 308 | −0.65% |
| 1926 | 251 | −0.78% |
| 1946 | 228 | −0.48% |
| 1962 | 250 | +0.58% |
| 1968 | 237 | −0.89% |

| Year | Pop. | ±% p.a. |
|---|---|---|
| 1975 | 243 | +0.36% |
| 1982 | 263 | +1.14% |
| 1990 | 264 | +0.05% |
| 1999 | 276 | +0.50% |
| 2007 | 288 | +0.53% |
| 2012 | 308 | +1.35% |
| 2017 | 314 | +0.39% |
| 2023 | 352 | +1.92% |

Source: EHESS and INSEE (1968-2023)

== Monuments ==
The church was built in 1788. In addition to the weekly mass, the church also hosts regular concerts and choir practice.

== Events ==
- Marche Populaire: Organized every year in September (since 1975) by the inhabitants of Largitzen, the "People's Walk" attracts hundreds of locals who gather to hike on the signed routes through the forest.
- Procession Équestre de la Saint Georges: On Easter Monday, horses are brought to the church to receive a blessing.

== See also ==
- Communes of the Haut-Rhin département
