= Gommersdorf =

Commune in Grand Est, France

- Commune
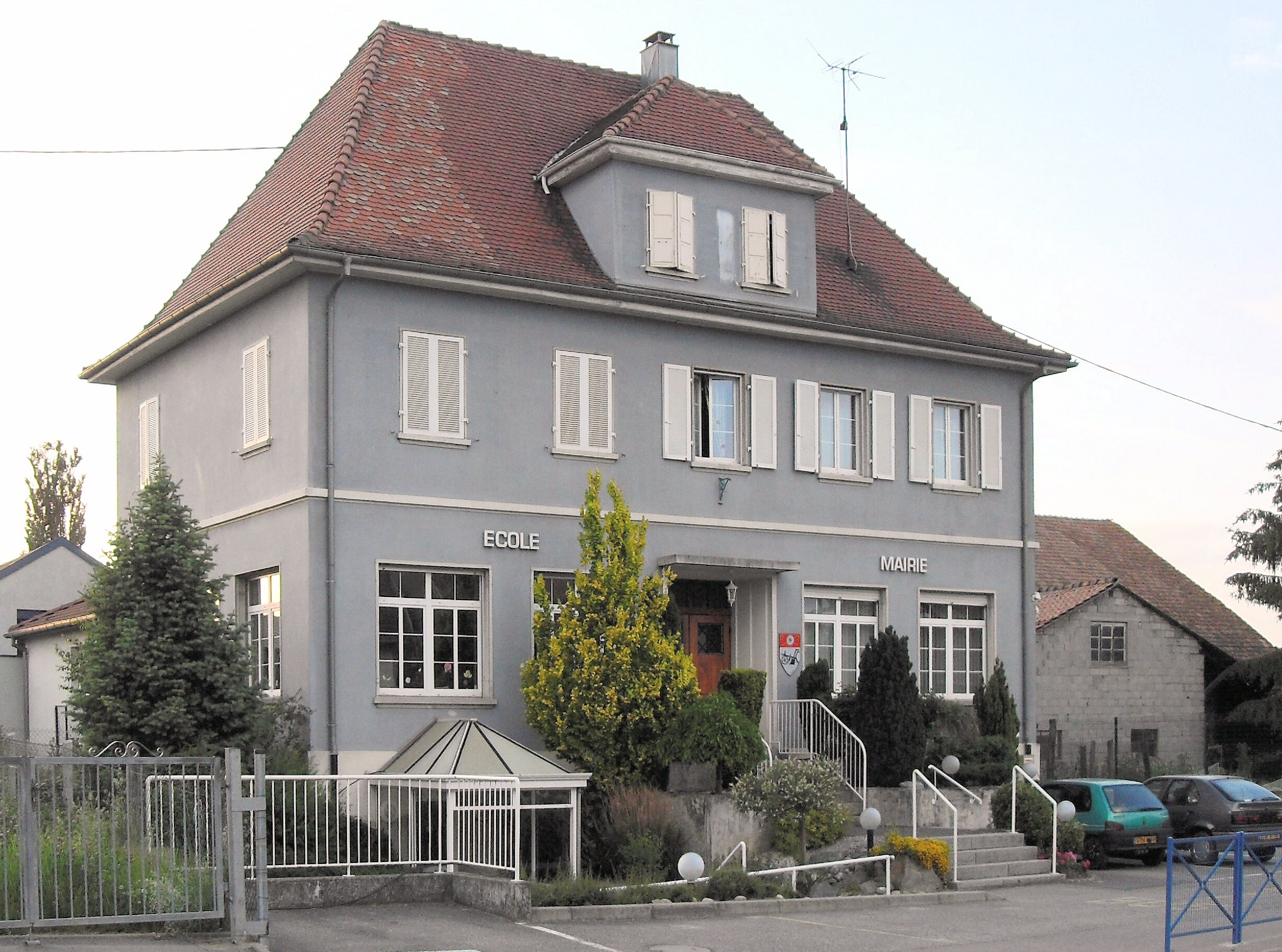
- The town hall and school in Gommersdorf

- Coat of arms
- Location of Gommersdorf
- Location within France Location within Grand Est
- Coordinates: 47°38′27″N 7°07′48″E
- Country: France
- Region: Grand Est
- Department: Haut-Rhin
- Arrondissement: Altkirch
- Canton: Masevaux-Niederbruck

Government
  - Mayor (2020–2026): Denis Nass
- Area^{1}: 4.15 km^{2} (1.60 sq mi)
- Elevation: 305 m (1,001 ft)
- Highest elevation: 326 m (1,070 ft)
- Lowest elevation: 287 m (942 ft)
- Population (2023): 406
  - Density: 97.8/km^{2} (253/sq mi)
- Time zone: UTC+01:00 (CET)
  - Summer (DST): UTC+02:00 (CEST)
- INSEE/Postal code: 68107 /68210
- ^{1} French Land Register data, which excludes lakes, ponds, glaciers > 1 km^{2} (0.386 sq mi or 247 acres) and river estuaries.

Gommersdorf (French pronunciation: [ɡɔməʁsdɔʁf]) is a commune in the Haut-Rhin department in Alsace in north-eastern France.

== See also ==
- Communes of the Haut-Rhin département
