= Wolfersdorf, Haut-Rhin =

Commune in Grand Est, France

Wolfersdorf
- Commune
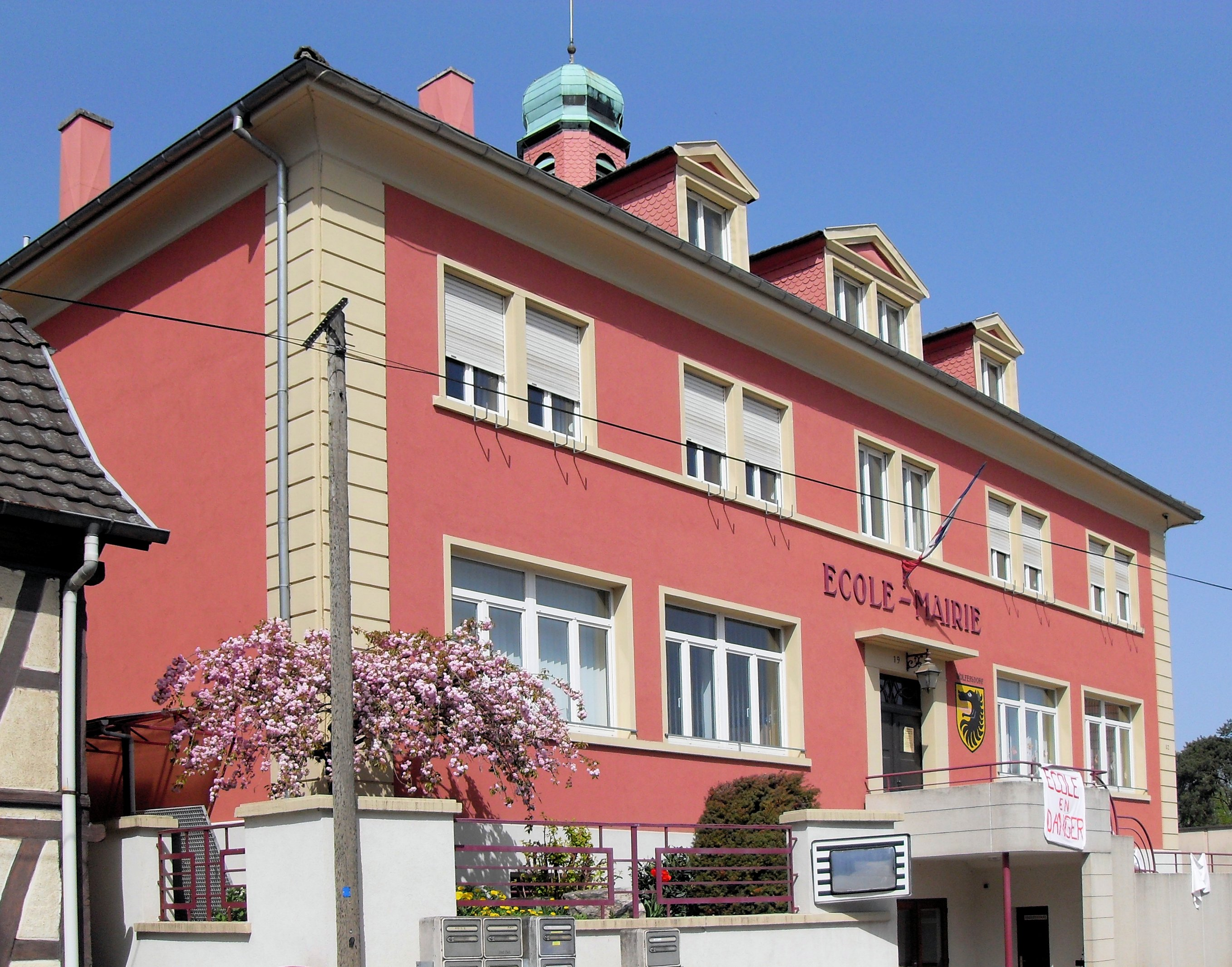
- The town hall and school in Wolfersdorf

- Coat of arms
- Location of Wolfersdorf
- Location within France Location within Grand Est
- Coordinates: 47°38′29″N 7°06′51″E
- Country: France
- Region: Grand Est
- Department: Haut-Rhin
- Arrondissement: Altkirch
- Canton: Masevaux-Niederbruck
- Intercommunality: Sud Alsace Largue

Government
  - Mayor (2020–2026): Claude Jud
- Area^{1}: 3.66 km^{2} (1.41 sq mi)
- Elevation: 297 m (974 ft)
- Highest elevation: 348 m (1,142 ft)
- Lowest elevation: 287 m (942 ft)
- Population (2023): 354
  - Density: 96.7/km^{2} (251/sq mi)
- Time zone: UTC+01:00 (CET)
  - Summer (DST): UTC+02:00 (CEST)
- INSEE/Postal code: 68378 /68210
- ^{1} French Land Register data, which excludes lakes, ponds, glaciers > 1 km^{2} (0.386 sq mi or 247 acres) and river estuaries.

Wolfersdorf is a commune in the Haut-Rhin department in Alsace in north-eastern France.

== Population ==
Historical population
Year	Pop.	±% p.a.
1968	284	—
1975	245	−2.09%
1982	309	+3.37%
1990	314	+0.20%
1999	351	+1.25%
2007	383	+1.10%
2012	351	−1.73%
2017	372	+1.17%
2023	354	−0.82%
Source: INSEE

== See also ==
- Communes of the Haut-Rhin department
