= Gildwiller =

Commune in Grand Est, France

- Commune
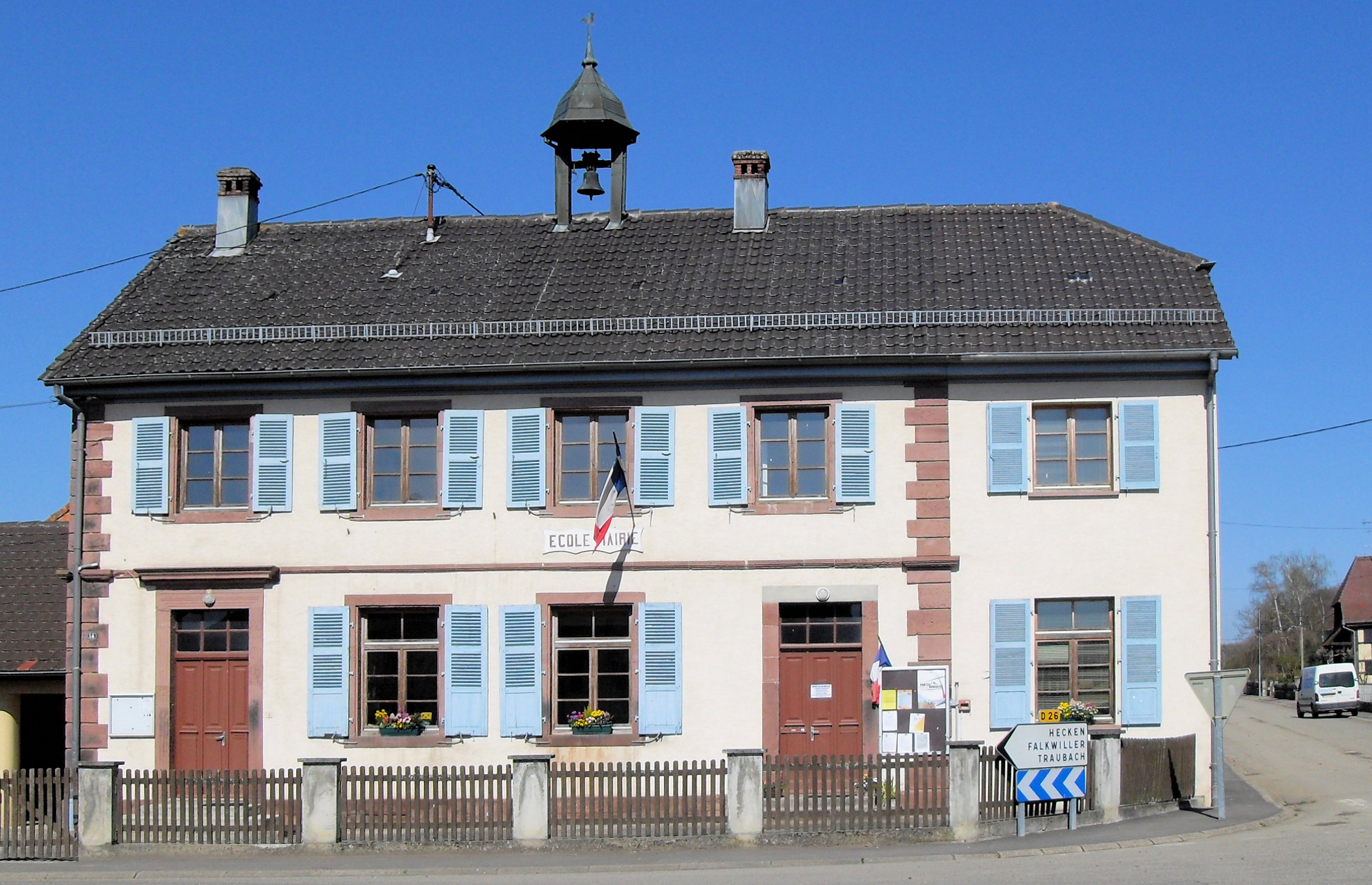
- The town hall and school in Gildwiller

- Coat of arms
- Location of Gildwiller
- Location within France Location within Grand Est
- Coordinates: 47°41′25″N 7°08′05″E
- Country: France
- Region: Grand Est
- Department: Haut-Rhin
- Arrondissement: Altkirch
- Canton: Masevaux-Niederbruck

Government
  - Mayor (2020–2026): Gilbert Lefevre
- Area^{1}: 5.02 km^{2} (1.94 sq mi)
- Elevation: 295 m (968 ft)
- Highest elevation: 357 m (1,171 ft)
- Lowest elevation: 288 m (945 ft)
- Population (2023): 261
  - Density: 52.0/km^{2} (135/sq mi)
- Time zone: UTC+01:00 (CET)
  - Summer (DST): UTC+02:00 (CEST)
- INSEE/Postal code: 68105 /68210
- ^{1} French Land Register data, which excludes lakes, ponds, glaciers > 1 km^{2} (0.386 sq mi or 247 acres) and river estuaries.

Gildwiller (French pronunciation: [ɡildvilɛʁ]; German: Gildweiler) is a commune in the Haut-Rhin department in Alsace in north-eastern France.

== See also ==
- Communes of the Haut-Rhin département
