= Bretten, Haut-Rhin =

Commune in Grand Est, France

Bretten
- Commune
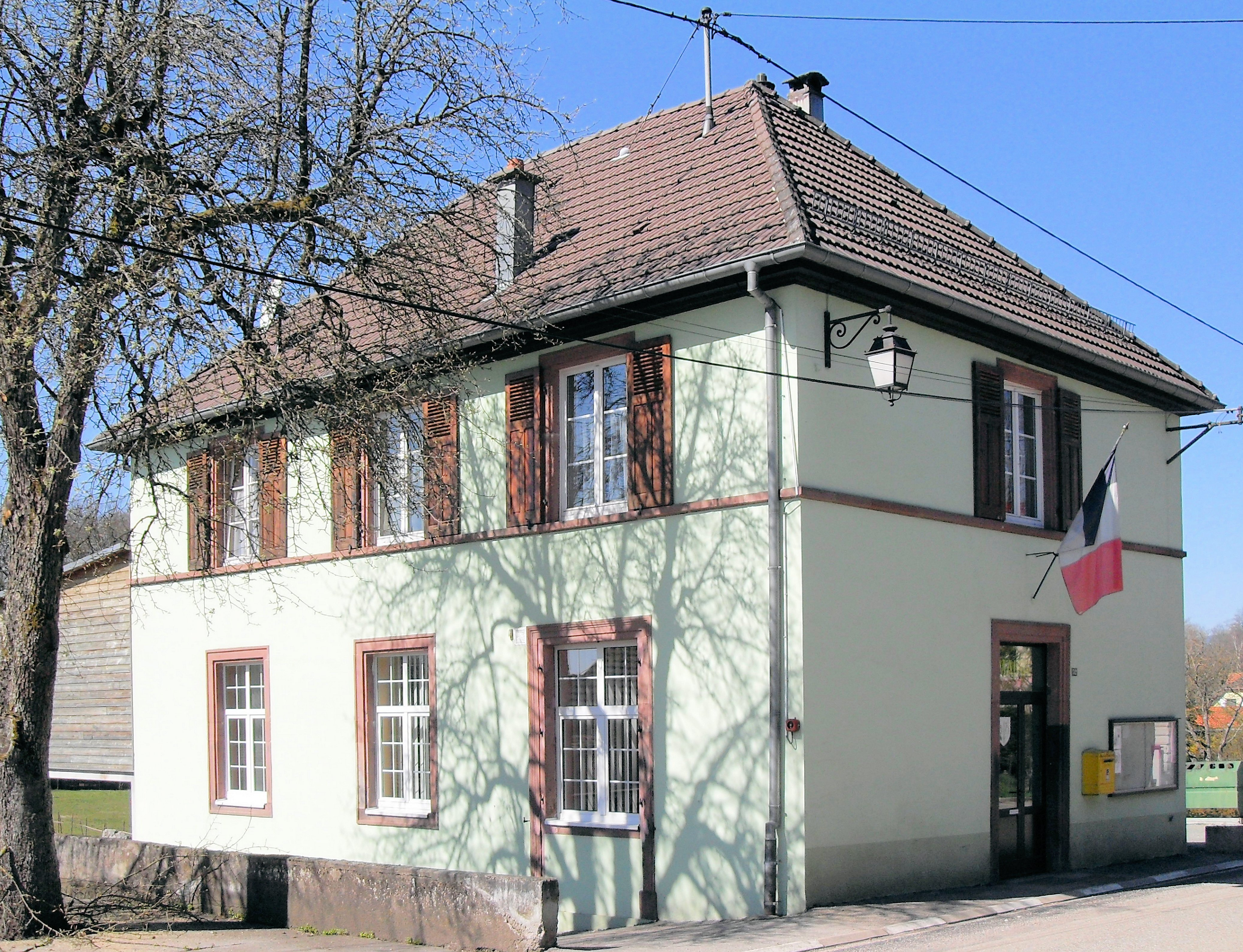
- The town hall in Bretten

- Coat of arms
- Location of Bretten
- Location within France Location within Grand Est
- Coordinates: 47°42′01″N 7°04′22″E
- Country: France
- Region: Grand Est
- Department: Haut-Rhin
- Arrondissement: Altkirch
- Canton: Masevaux-Niederbruck

Government
  - Mayor (2020–2026): Michel Gless
- Area^{1}: 4.16 km^{2} (1.61 sq mi)
- Elevation: 345 m (1,132 ft)
- Highest elevation: 398 m (1,306 ft)
- Lowest elevation: 324 m (1,063 ft)
- Population (2023): 184
  - Density: 44.2/km^{2} (115/sq mi)
- Time zone: UTC+01:00 (CET)
  - Summer (DST): UTC+02:00 (CEST)
- INSEE/Postal code: 68052 /68780
- ^{1} French Land Register data, which excludes lakes, ponds, glaciers > 1 km^{2} (0.386 sq mi or 247 acres) and river estuaries.

Bretten (French pronunciation: [bʁɛtən]) is a commune in the Haut-Rhin department in Alsace in north-eastern France.

== See also ==
- Communes of the Haut-Rhin department
