= Traubach-le-Bas =

Commune in Grand Est, France

- Commune
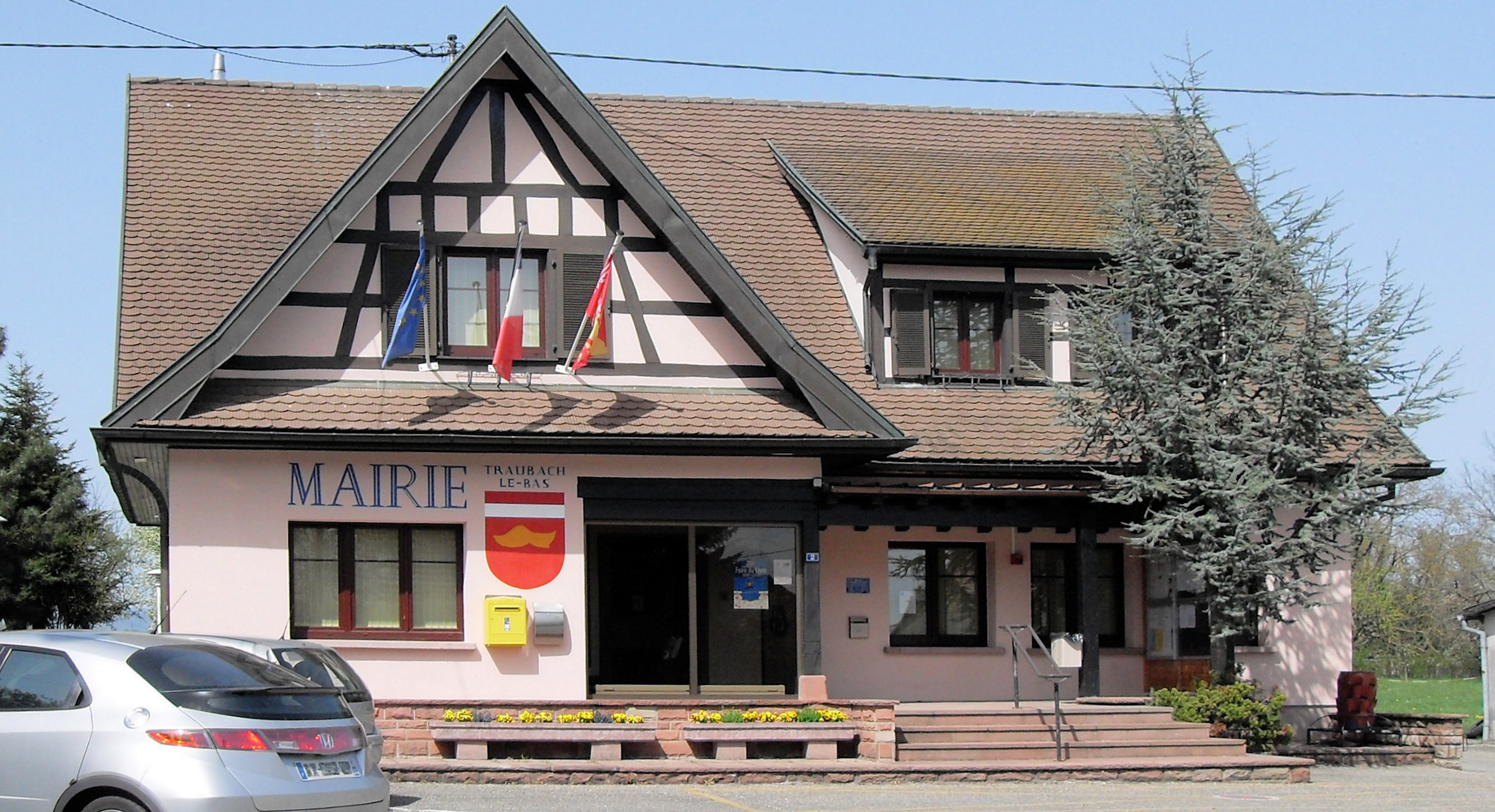
- The town hall in Traubach-le-Bas

- Coat of arms
- Location of Traubach-le-Bas
- Location within France Location within Grand Est
- Coordinates: 47°39′24″N 7°06′06″E
- Country: France
- Region: Grand Est
- Department: Haut-Rhin
- Arrondissement: Altkirch
- Canton: Masevaux-Niederbruck

Government
  - Mayor (2020–2026): Francis Robischung
- Area^{1}: 6.78 km^{2} (2.62 sq mi)
- Elevation: 300 m (980 ft)
- Highest elevation: 368 m (1,207 ft)
- Lowest elevation: 288 m (945 ft)
- Population (2023): 484
  - Density: 71.4/km^{2} (185/sq mi)
- Time zone: UTC+01:00 (CET)
  - Summer (DST): UTC+02:00 (CEST)
- INSEE/Postal code: 68336 /68210
- ^{1} French Land Register data, which excludes lakes, ponds, glaciers > 1 km^{2} (0.386 sq mi or 247 acres) and river estuaries.

Traubach-le-Bas (German: Niedertraubach) is a commune in the Haut-Rhin department in Alsace in north-eastern France.

== See also ==
- Communes of the Haut-Rhin department
