= Buethwiller =

Commune in Grand Est, France

- Commune
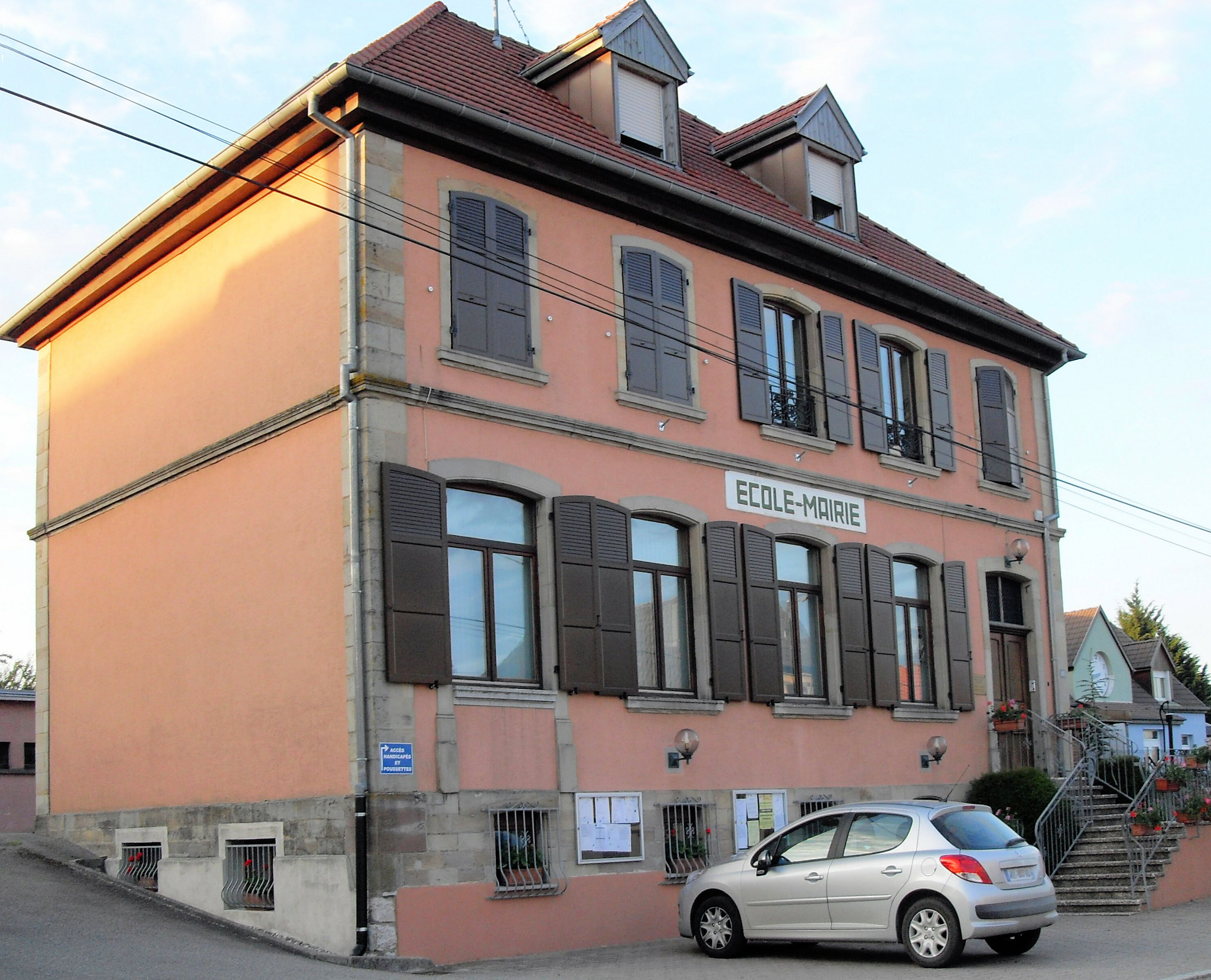
- The town hall and school in Buethwiller

- Coat of arms
- Location of Buethwiller
- Location within France Location within Grand Est
- Coordinates: 47°39′26″N 7°09′00″E
- Country: France
- Region: Grand Est
- Department: Haut-Rhin
- Arrondissement: Altkirch
- Canton: Masevaux-Niederbruck

Government
  - Mayor (2020–2026): Eric Bringel
- Area^{1}: 3.84 km^{2} (1.48 sq mi)
- Highest elevation: 317 m (1,040 ft)
- Lowest elevation: 279 m (915 ft)
- Population (2023): 240
  - Density: 62/km^{2} (160/sq mi)
- Time zone: UTC+01:00 (CET)
  - Summer (DST): UTC+02:00 (CEST)
- INSEE/Postal code: 68057 /68210
- ^{1} French Land Register data, which excludes lakes, ponds, glaciers > 1 km^{2} (0.386 sq mi or 247 acres) and river estuaries.

Buethwiller (French pronunciation: [bytvilɛʁ]; German: Bütweiler) is a commune in the Haut-Rhin department in Alsace in north-eastern France.

== See also ==
- Communes of the Haut-Rhin department
