= Falkwiller =

- Commune
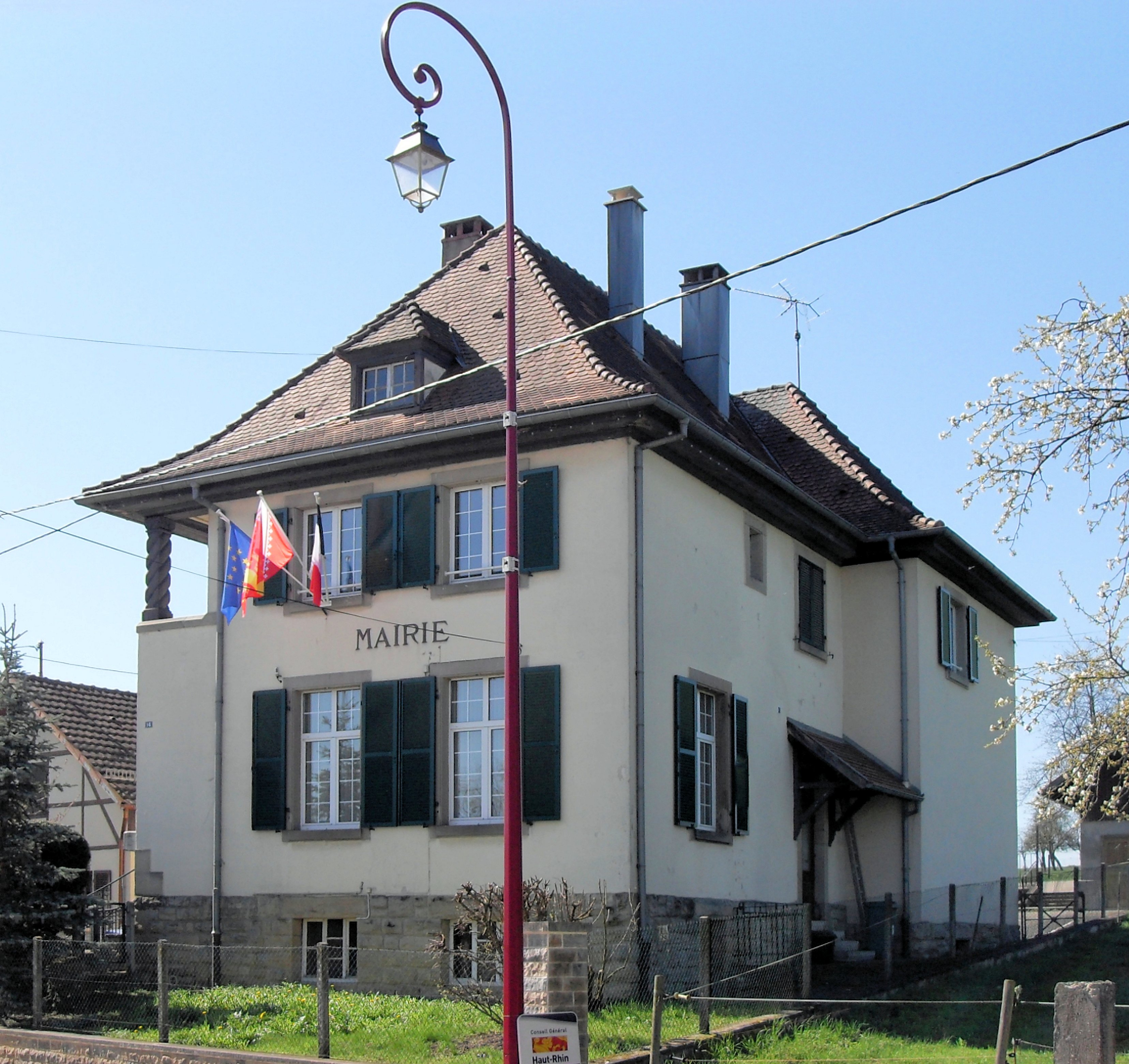
- The town hall in Falkwiller

- Coat of arms
- Location of Falkwiller
- Location within France Location within Grand Est
- Coordinates: 47°40′56″N 7°08′05″E
- Country: France
- Region: Grand Est
- Department: Haut-Rhin
- Arrondissement: Altkirch
- Canton: Masevaux-Niederbruck

Government
  - Mayor (2020–2026): Jean-Marc Schnoebelen
- Area^{1}: 3.55 km^{2} (1.37 sq mi)
- Elevation: 295 m (968 ft)
- Highest elevation: 351 m (1,152 ft)
- Lowest elevation: 286 m (938 ft)
- Population (2023): 214
  - Density: 60.3/km^{2} (156/sq mi)
- Time zone: UTC+01:00 (CET)
  - Summer (DST): UTC+02:00 (CEST)
- INSEE/Postal code: 68086 /68210
- ^{1} French Land Register data, which excludes lakes, ponds, glaciers > 1 km^{2} (0.386 sq mi or 247 acres) and river estuaries.

Falkwiller (French pronunciation: [falkvilɛʁ]; German: Falkweiler) is a commune in the Haut-Rhin department in Alsace in north-eastern France.

== See also ==
- Communes of the Haut-Rhin département
