= Sickert, Haut-Rhin =

Commune in Grand Est, France

Sickert
- Commune
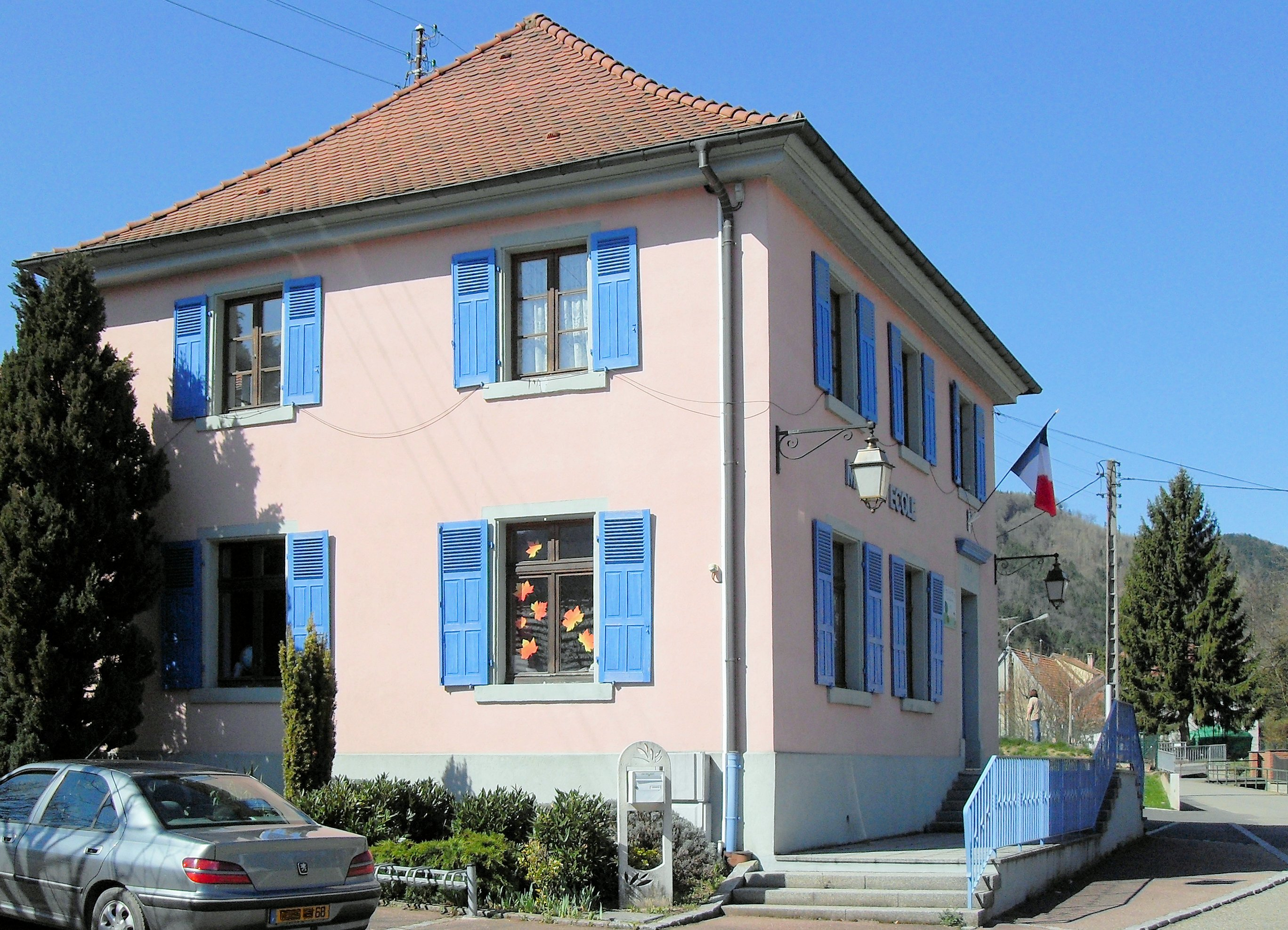
- The town hall and school in Sickert

- Coat of arms
- Location of Sickert
- Location within France Location within Grand Est
- Coordinates: 47°47′05″N 6°58′47″E
- Country: France
- Region: Grand Est
- Department: Haut-Rhin
- Arrondissement: Thann-Guebwiller
- Canton: Masevaux-Niederbruck
- Intercommunality: Vallée de la Doller et du Soultzbach

Government
  - Mayor (2020–2026): Bertrand Hirth
- Area^{1}: 5.12 km^{2} (1.98 sq mi)
- Elevation: 425 m (1,394 ft)
- Highest elevation: 900 m (3,000 ft)
- Lowest elevation: 409 m (1,342 ft)
- Population (2023): 333
  - Density: 65.0/km^{2} (168/sq mi)
- Time zone: UTC+01:00 (CET)
  - Summer (DST): UTC+02:00 (CEST)
- INSEE/Postal code: 68308 /68290
- ^{1} French Land Register data, which excludes lakes, ponds, glaciers > 1 km^{2} (0.386 sq mi or 247 acres) and river estuaries.

Sickert is a commune in the Haut-Rhin department in Grand Est in north-eastern France.

== See also ==
- Communes of the Haut-Rhin department
