= List of land borders with dates of establishment =

This list of land borders with date of establishment identifies the historical year in which borders were established between countries.

== Europe ==
=== Albania–Greece ===
  - 1913/1914 after Greek withdrawal due to international diplomatic pressure.

=== Albania–Montenegro ===
- Shkodër - Berane
  - 1913 at the Treaty of London ending the Balkan Wars.
- From Shkodër - Podgorica to Shkodër - Ulcinj
  - 1878 at the Treaty of Berlin, border between Montenegro and the Ottoman Empire.
  - 1913 at the Treaty of London

=== Albania–North Macedonia ===
  - 1913 at the Treaty of London, border between Albania and Serbia.
  - 1991 Independence for the Republic of Macedonia.

=== Albania–Serbia ===
  - 1913 at the Treaty of London.

=== Andorra–France ===
  - 985 France doesn't help Barcelona versus the Saracens, border between France and Barcelona.
  - 1278 Foix gains co-sovereignty over Andorra next to the bishop of Urgel.
- 2001 - minor change to border

=== Andorra–Spain ===
  - 1278 Foix gains co-sovereignty over Andorra next to the Bishop of Urgel.
  - 1479 Union between Castile and Aragon, the beginning of Spain.

=== Austria–Czech Republic ===
  - 12th/13th century, region settled by Germans, border between Austria and Bohemia (Czech Republic).

=== Austria–Liechtenstein ===
  - 1719 Creation of Liechtenstein.

=== Austria–Switzerland ===
- Stuben - Scuol
  - 1363 Tyrol becomes Austrian, border between Austria and the bishopric of Chur.
  - 1497/1498 Grissons allies with Switzerland.
- Schruns - Davos
  - 1420 Austria acquires Montafon, border between Austria and Toggenburg.
  - 1497/1498 Grissons allies with Switzerland.
- Bregenz - St. Gallen
  - 15th century, Austria becomes the dominant power on the east bank of the Rhine.
  - 1491 Switzerland takes control of the west bank of the Rhine.

=== Austria–Slovakia ===
  - 976 Babenberger receive the Eastmark from the Germanic king, border between Austria and Hungary.
  - 1993 Slovakia gains independence from Czechoslovakia.

=== Austria–Hungary ===
  - 1919 at the Treaty of Saint-Germain, one of the treaties ending World War I.

=== Austria–Slovenia ===
  - 1919 at the Treaty of Saint-Germain, border between Austria and Yugoslavia.
  - 1991 Slovenian independence.

=== Austria–Germany ===
  - 1871 establishment of the German Empire, border between Austria-Hungary and Germany.

=== Austria–Italy ===
- From Nauders - Mals to Lienz - Bruneck
  - 1919 at the Treaty of Saint-Germain.
- Kötschach - Paluzza
  - 1st millennium, border between Italy and Carinthia.
  - 1335 Carinthia is inherited by the duke of Austria, border between Austria and Aquileia.
  - 1866 Venice conquered by Italy from Austria.
- Villach - Tarvisio
  - 1919 at the Treaty of Saint-Germain.

=== Azerbaijan–Georgia ===
  - 1991 Azerbaijani and Georgian independence from the Soviet Union.

=== Azerbaijan–Russia ===
  - 1991 dissolution of the Soviet Union.

=== Belarus–Latvia ===
  - 1920 peace between Latvia/Poland and the Soviet Union, border between Latvia and the Soviet Union/Poland.
  - 1991 Belarusian and Latvian independence.

=== Belarus–Poland ===
  - 1945 after the annexation of Belarusian-populated eastern Poland by the Soviet Union during World War II, border between Poland and the Soviet Union.
  - 1991 Belarusian independence.

=== Belarus–Russia ===
- From Polatsk - Velikiye Luki to Mahilyow - Klincy
  - 1991 dissolution of the Soviet Union.
- Gomel - Klincy
  - 1667 at the Treaty of Andrusovo ending the Russo-Polish War, border between Russia and Poland–Lithuania.
  - 1991 dissolution of the Soviet Union.

=== Belarus–Ukraine ===
  - 1991 Belarusian and Ukrainian independence.

=== Belgium–Netherlands ===
- From Knokke-Heist - Cadzand to Bree - Budel
  - 1648 at the peace of Westphalia between the Netherlands and Spain ending the Thirty Years' War.
  - 1830/1839 after the Belgian Revolution against the (united) Netherlands.
- From Bree - Weert to Plombières - Vaals
  - 1839 at the Treaty of London.

=== Belgium–France ===
- From De Panne - Bray-Dunes to Poperinge - Godewaersvelde
  - 1697 at the peace of Rijswijk, between France and Spain.
  - 1830/1839 After the Belgian Revolution.
- From Loker - Bailleul to Comines
  - 1713 at the peace of Utrecht, between France and Austria
  - 1830/1839 After the Belgian Revolution.
- From Menen - Tourcoing to Mons - Maubeuge
  - 1697 at the peace of Rijswijk, between France and Spain.
  - 1830/1839 After the Belgian Revolution.
- From Binche - Maubeuge to Chimay - Fourmies
  - 1678/1679 at the peace of Nijmegen, between France and Spain.
  - 1830/1839 After the Belgian Revolution.
- Couvin - Rocroi
  - 941? Border between France and Germany.
  - 1830/1839 After the Belgian Revolution.
- From Couvin - Revin to Agimont - Givet
  - 1678/1679 at the peace of Nijmegen, between France and the bishopric of Liege.
  - 1830/1839 After the Belgian Revolution.
- From Hastière - Givet to Aubange - Longwy
  - 1697 at the peace of Rijswijk, between France and Germany (Spain and the bishopric of Liege).
  - 1830/1839 After the Belgian Revolution.

=== Belgium–Luxembourg ===
- From Aubange - Pétange to Gouvy - Huldange
  - 1839 at the Treaty of London.
- Burg-Reuland - Leithum
  - 1839 at the Treaty of London, between Luxembourg and Prussia.
  - 1919 at the Treaty of Versailles.

=== Belgium–Germany ===
  - 1919 at the Treaty of Versailles.

=== Bosnia and Herzegovina–Croatia ===
  - 1995 Dayton Agreement ending the Bosnian War.

=== Bosnia and Herzegovina–Montenegro ===
- Sarajevo - Pljevlja
  - 1913 at the Treaty of London, border between Montenegro and Austria-Hungary.
  - 1995 Dayton Agreement, border between Bosnia and Herzegovina and Yugoslavia.
  - 2006 Montenegrin independence.
- Sarajevo - Nikšić
  - 1878 at the Treaty of Berlin, border between Montenegro and Austria-Hungary.
  - 1995 Dayton Agreement, border between Bosnia and Herzegovina and Yugoslavia.
  - 2006 Montenegrin independence.
- Trebinje - Herceg Novi
  - 1995 Dayton Agreement, border between Bosnia and Herzegovina and Yugoslavia.
  - 2006 Montenegrin independence.

=== Bosnia and Herzegovina–Serbia ===
- Zvornik - Loznica
  - 13th century, after Serbian conquest, border between Serbia and Bosnia.
  - 1992 Bosnia Independence from Yugoslavia, borders Serbian republic within Yugoslavia
  - 1995 Dayton Agreement, border between Bosnia and Herzegovina and Yugoslavia.
  - 2006 Serbian self-determination.
- Sarajevo - Priboj
  - 1913 at the Treaty of London, border between Serbia and Austria-Hungary.
  - 1992 Independence from Yugoslavia, borders Serbian republic within Yugoslavia
  - 1995 Dayton Agreement, border between Bosnia and Herzegovina and Yugoslavia.
  - 2006 Serbian self-determination.

=== Bulgaria–Greece ===
- Petrich - Sidirokastro
  - 1913 at the Treaty of London.
- From Smolyan - Xanthi to Svilengrad - Orestiada
  - 1919 at the Treaty of Neuilly.

=== Bulgaria–North Macedonia ===
- Petric - Strumica
  - 1919 at the Treaty of Neuilly, border between Bulgaria and Yugoslavia.
  - 1991 Independence for the Republic of Macedonia.
- Blagoevgrad - Kočani
  - 1913 at the Treaty of Bucharest, border between Bulgaria and Serbia.
  - 1991 Independence for the Republic of Macedonia.
- Kyustendil - Skopje
  - 1878 Bulgarian independence, border between Bulgaria and the Ottoman Empire.
  - 1991 Independence for the Republic of Macedonia.

=== Bulgaria–Romania ===
- Varna - Constanța
  - 1878 after the defeat of the Ottoman Empire.
- From Silistra - Fetești to Vidin - Calafat
  - 1185 After Bulgarian uprise against the Byzantine Empire, border between Bulgaria and the Cumans.
  - 1859 formation of Romania, border between Romania and the Ottoman Empire.
  - 1878 Bulgarian independence.

=== Bulgaria–Serbia ===
- Sofia - Pirot
  - 1919 at the Treaty of Neuilly, border between Bulgaria and Yugoslavia.
  - 2006 Serbian self-determination.
- Vidin - Zaječar
  - 1878 Bulgarian and Serbian independence.

=== Bulgaria–Turkey ===
- Burgas - Kırklareli
  - 1913 at the Treaty of London, border between Bulgaria and the Ottoman Empire (Turkey).
- Elhovo - Edirne
  - 1885 after the East Rumelian revolution, border between Bulgaria and the Ottoman Empire (Turkey).
- Svilengrad - Edirne
  - 1919 at the Treaty of Neuilly, border between Bulgaria and the Ottoman Empire (Turkey).

=== Croatia–Hungary ===
- Osijek - Pécs
  - 1920 at the Treaty of Trianon, border between Hungary and Yugoslavia.
  - 1991 Croatian independence.
- From Našice - Pécs to Varaždin - Nagykanizsa
  - 10th century.

=== Croatia–Montenegro ===
  - 1991 Croatian independence, border between Croatia and Yugoslavia.
  - 2006 Montenegrin independence.

=== Croatia–Serbia ===
- Osijek - Apatin
  - 1995 Dayton agreement, border between Croatia and Yugoslavia.
  - 2006 Serbian self-determination.
- Vukovar - Bačka Palanka
  - 925 Croatia conquers Slavonia, border between Croatia and Hungary.
  - 2006 Serbian self-determination.
- Vukovar - Sremska Mitrovica
  - 1995 Dayton agreement, border between Croatia and Yugoslavia.
  - 2006 Serbian self-determination.

=== Croatia–Slovenia ===
- Čakovec - Murska Sobota
  - 1991 Croatian and Slovenian independence.
- From Varaždin - Ptuj to Rijeka - Postojna
  - 10th century, border between Croatia and Germany.
  - 1991 Croatian and Slovenian independence.
- Pazin - Koper
  - 1991 Croatian and Slovenian independence.

=== Czech Republic–Germany ===
- From Volary - Neureichenau to Mariánské Lázně - Mähring
  - 843 Treaty of Verdun dividing the Carolingian Empire, border between Germany and the Bohemians (Czechs).
- Cheb - Marktredwitz
  - 1266 Egerland (Cheb) becomes Bohemian (dispute whether Bohemia was German at that time).
- From Kraslice - Klingenthal to Hrádek nad Nisou - Zittau
  - 9th century, Bohemia established, border between Bohemia (Czechs) and the Sorbs.
  - 10th century, Germans conquer Sorb territories.

=== Czech Republic–Poland ===
- From Liberec - Gorlice to Trutnov - Wałbrzych
  - 9th century, border between Bohemia (Czech Republic) and Great Moravia.
  - 10th century, border between Bohemia (Czech Republic) and Poland.
  - 1945 Stalin gives German Silesia to Poland, border between Poland and Czechoslovakia.
  - 1993 Czechoslovakia dissolved.
- Náchod - Kłodzko to Ostrava - Racibórz
  - 1945 Stalin gives German Silesia to Poland, border between Poland and Czechoslovakia.
  - 1993 Czechoslovakia dissolved.
- Český Těšín - Cieszyn
  - 1919 border between Czechoslovakia and Poland.
  - 1993 Czechoslovakia dissolved.

=== Czech Republic–Slovakia ===
- From Břeclav - Senica to Frýdek-Místek - Žilina
  - 10th century, Bohemia acquires Moravia, border between Bohemia (Czech Republic) and Hungary.
  - 1993 Czechoslovakia splits in two.
- Český Těšín - Čadca
  - 1298 Bohemia acquires Upper Silesia, border between Bohemia (Czech Republic) and Hungary.
  - 1993 Czechoslovakia splits in two.

=== Denmark–Germany ===
  - 1920 after the Schleswig plebiscites.

=== Denmark–Sweden ===
  - 1658 as a maritime border, Treaty of Roskilde
  - 2000 as an artificial land border, opening of the Copenhagen - Malmö bridge and tunnel

=== Estonia–Latvia ===
  - 1918 Latvian and Estonian independence from Russia.

=== Estonia–Russia ===
- Narva - Ivangorod
  - 1478 Russian conquest of Novgorod, border between Russia and the German Order.
  - 1991 dissolution of the Soviet Union.
- Võru - Pskov
  - 1510 Russian conquest of Pskov, border between Russia and the German Order.
  - 1991 dissolution of the Soviet Union.

=== Finland–Norway ===
  - 1751 Treaty of Strömstad, fairly undefined and disputed before that

=== Finland–Russia ===
- Nellim - Nikel
  - 1946 at the Treaty of Paris, border between Finland and the Soviet Union.
- Kuusamo - Topozero
  - 1917 Finnish independence.
- Kotka - Vyborg
  - 1946 at the Treaty of Paris, border between Finland and the Soviet Union.

=== Finland–Sweden ===
  - 17 September 1809 - Treaty of Fredrikshamn ending the Finnish War, border between the Grand Duchy of Finland and Sweden.

=== France–Switzerland ===
- Saint-Louis - Basel
  - 1501 Basel becomes a member of the Swiss Confederation, border between the Habsburg territories and Switzerland.
  - 1648 at the Treaty of Westphalia.
- Wentzwiller - Oberwil
  - 1648 at the Treaty of Westphalia, border between France and the bishopric of Basel.
  - 1815 at the Congress of Vienna ending the Napoleonic Wars.
- Leymen - Hofstetten-Flüh
  - 1515 Swiss Solothurn buys Rotberg from the Rotberg family, border between the Habsburg territories and Switzerland.
  - 1648 at the Treaty of Westphalia.
- Lutter - Cholholx
  - 1648 at the Treaty of Westphalia, border between France and the bishopric of Basel.
  - 1815 at the congress of Vienna.
- Lutter - Kleinlützel
  - 1527 Swiss Solothurn buys Kleinlützel from the monastery of Kleinlützel, border between the Habsburg territories and Switzerland.
  - 1648 at the Treaty of Westphalia.
- From Blochmont - Ederswiler to Delle - Buix
  - 1648 at the Treaty of Westphalia, border between France and the bishopric of Basel.
  - 1815 at the congress of Vienna.
- Montbéliard–Porrentruy
  - 1815 at the congress of Vienna.
- From Vaufrey - Porrentruy to Pontarlier - Fleurier
  - 1678/1679 at the Treaty of Nijmegen ending the Franco-Dutch War, border between France and Germany (bishopric of Basel and Neuchâtel).
  - 1815 at the congress of Vienna.
- From Les Fourgs - Sainte-Croix to Les Rousses - Saint-Cergue
  - 1536 border between Switzerland and Burgundy.
  - 1678/1679 at the Treaty of Nijmegen.
- From Gex - Saint-Cergue to Gex - Geneva
  - 1536 after Swiss expansion, border between Switzerland and Savoy.
  - 1601 after French expansion.
  - 1932 borders finally settled.
- Annemasse - Geneva
  - 1536 Geneva member of the Swiss Confederation, border between Switzerland and Savoy.
  - 1860 Savoy ceded to France by Sardinia-Piemonte.
- Douvain - Geneva
  - 1569 Chablais returns to Savoy, border between Switzerland and Savoy.
  - 1860 Savoy ceded to France by Sardinia-Piemonte.
- From Thonon-les-Bains - Monthey to Chamonix-Mont-Blanc - Martigny
  - 15th/16th century, after Swiss expansion, border between Switzerland and Savoy.
  - 1860 Savoy ceded to France by Sardinia-Piemonte.

=== France–Italy ===
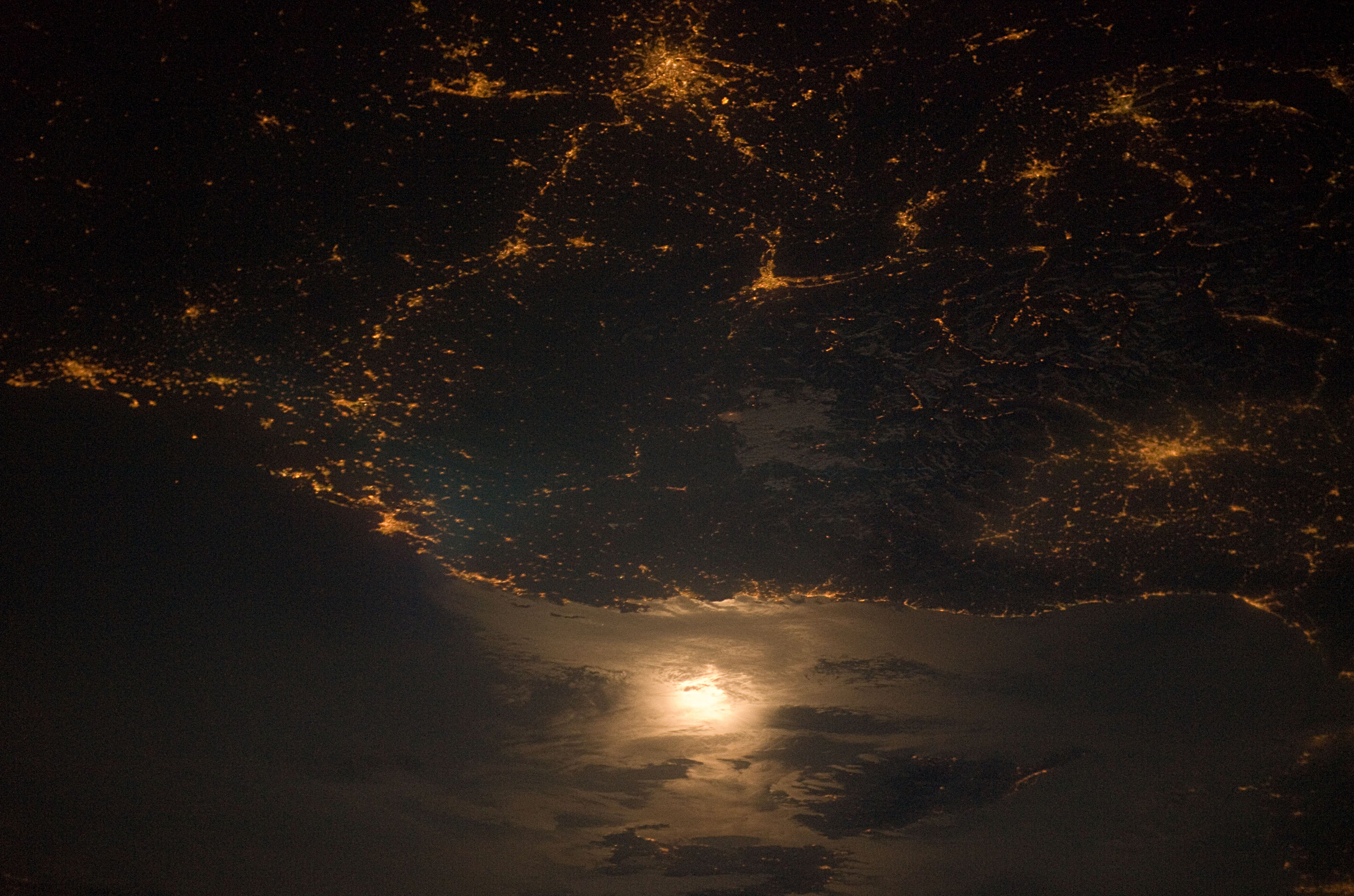
Astronaut photograph of the France-Italy border at night.

- Chamonix-Mont-Blanc - Courmayeur
  - 1860 Savoy ceded to France by Sardinia-Piemonte.
- Bourg-Saint-Maurice - Susa
  - 1st millennium, Border between Italy and Burgundy.
  - 1860 Savoy ceded to France by Sardinia-Piemonte.
- Briançon - Cesana Torinese
  - 1st millennium, Border between Italy and Burgundy.
  - 1349 France buys Dauphiné from the heir, border between France and Germany (Savoy and Saluzzo).
  - 1860 after Italian unification.
- Barcelonette - Demonte
  - 1st millennium, Border between Italy and Burgundy.
  - 1481, Provence inherited by the king of France, border between France and Germany (Savoy and Saluzzo).
  - 1860 after Italian unification.
- From Isola - Vinadio to Sospel - Camporosso
  - 1860 Italian unification and Nice ceded to France.
- Menton - Ventimiglia
  - 1860 Italian unification, border between Italy and Mentone.
  - 1861 Mentone annexed by France.

=== France–Monaco ===
  - 1848/1861 Revolt in Monaco's hinterland, France annexes rebel territory.

=== France–Spain ===
- From Banyuls-sur-Mer - Llanca to Bourg-Madame - Puigcerdà
  - 1659 at the Treaty of the Pyrenees ending the Franco-Spanish War.
- Saint-Girons - Rialp
  - 985 France doesn't help its province Barcelona against the Saracens, border between France and Barcelona.
  - 1479 Aragon and Castile are unified and become known as Spain.
- From Bagnères-de-Luchon - Vielha to Cauterets - Sallent de Gállego
  - 843 at the Treaty of Verdun, border between France and Aragon.
  - 1479 Aragon and Castile are unified and become known as Spain.
- Urdos - Canfranc
  - 843 at the Treaty of Verdun, border between France and Aragon. (French possession of Béarn was disputed until 1620).
  - 1479 Aragon and Castile are unified and become known as Spain.
- Arette - Isaba
  - 843 at the Treaty of Verdun, Border between France and Pamplona.
  - 1512 Castile (Spain) annexes southern Navarra.
- Saint-Étienne-de-Baïgorry - Baztan
  - 1512 Castile (Spain) annexes southern Navarra, border between Castile (Spain) and Lower Navarre.
  - 1620 France annexes Lower Navarre.
- Cambo-les-Bains - Baztan
  - 843 at the Treaty of Verdun, Border between France and Pamplona.
  - 1512 Castile (Spain) annexes southern Navarra.
- Hendaye - Irun
  - 843 at the Treaty of Verdun, Border between France and Pamplona.
  - 1479 Aragon and Castile are unified and become known as Spain.

=== France–Germany ===
  - 17th century
  - 1871, German unification, Prussia annexes Alsace-Lorraine in the Franco-Prussian War.
  - 1919, the Treaty of Versailles returns Alsace-Lorraine to France.

=== France–Luxembourg ===
- Esch-sur-Alzette - Villerupt
  - Middle Ages, between Luxembourg and Bar.
  - 1659 at the Treaty of the Pyrenees, between France and Spain.
  - 1839 at the Treaty of London.
- Dudelange - Thionville
  - 1659 at the Treaty of the Pyrenees, between France and Spain.
  - 1839 at the Treaty of London.
- Schengen - Sierck-les-Bains
  - Middle Ages, between Luxembourg and Lorraine.
  - 1661 at the Treaty of Vincennes, between France and Spain.
  - 1839 at the Treaty of London.

=== France–UK ===
- Calais - Dover

=== Georgia–Russia ===
- From Tbilisi - Makhachkala to Kutaisi - Vladikavkaz
  - 1991 dissolution of the Soviet Union.
- Kutaisi - Nalchik
  - 1001, Georgia acquires Abkhazia, border between Georgia and Alania.
  - 1557 Russia conquers Kabardino-Balkaria, border between Russia and the Ottoman Empire.
  - 1991 dissolution of the Soviet Union.
- Sukhumi - Cherkessk
  - 1001, Georgia acquires Abkhazia, border between Georgia and Alania.
  - 1991 dissolution of the Soviet Union.
- Sukhumi - Sochi
  - 15th century, border between Georgia and the Ubykhs.
  - 1991 dissolution of the Soviet Union.

=== Germany–Luxembourg ===
  - 1815 at the Treaty of Vienna, between the (united) Netherlands and Prussia (German Confederation).
  - 1839 at the Treaty of London, between Luxembourg and Prussia (German Confederation).

=== Germany–Netherlands ===
- From Aachen - Vaals to Kleve - Gennep
  - 1815 at the Congress of Vienna, between the (united) Netherlands and Prussia (German Confederation).
- From Kranenburg - Groesbeek to Bunde - Nieuweschans
  - 1648 at the peace of Westphalia, between the Netherlands and the Holy Roman Empire of the German nation.

=== Germany–Poland ===
  - 1945 Stalin gives Eastern Germany to Poland, border between Soviet occupied Germany and Poland set at the Oder–Neisse line.

=== Germany–Switzerland ===
- Lörrach - Basel
  - 1648 at the Treaty of Westphalia.
- From Rheinfelden to Laufenburg
  - 1806 at the German Mediatisation (Reichsdeputationshauptschluss), between the Confederation of the Rhine (Germany) and the Republic of Helvetia (Switzerland).
- From Waldshut-Tiengen - Döttingen to the Bodensee
  - 1648 at the Treaty of Westphalia.

=== Greece–North Macedonia ===
  - 1913 at the Treaty of London, border between Greece and Serbia.

=== Greece–Turkey ===
  - 1913 at the Treaty of London, border between Bulgaria and the Ottoman Empire (Turkey).
  - 1923 at the Treaty of Lausanne ending the Greco-Turkish War.

=== Hungary–Romania ===
  - 1920 at the Treaty of Trianon.

=== Hungary–Slovakia ===
  - 1920 at the Treaty of Trianon, border between Hungary and Czechoslovakia.

=== Hungary–Serbia ===
  - 1920 at the Treaty of Trianon, border between Hungary and Yugoslavia.

=== Hungary–Slovenia ===
  - 1920 at the Treaty of Trianon, border between Hungary and Yugoslavia.
  - 1991 Slovenian independence.

=== Hungary–Ukraine ===
  - 1920 at the Treaty of Trianon, border between Hungary and Czechoslovakia.

=== Ireland–UK ===
  - 1921 Independence of Ireland.

=== Italy–San Marino ===
  - 1st millennium/1631, border between San Marino and Papal States.
  - 1860 Italian nationalists conquer the eastern Papal States.

=== Italy–Slovenia ===
- Tarvisio - Kranjska Gora
  - 1919 at the Treaty of Saint-Germain, border between Italy and Yugoslavia.
  - 1991 Slovenian declaration of independence.
- From Cave del Predil - Strmec na Predelu to Gorizia - Nova Gorica
  - 1947 at the Treaty of Paris, border between Italy and Yugoslavia.
- Trieste - Postojna
  - 1954 Free state Trieste dissolved, border between Italy and Yugoslavia.

=== Italy–Switzerland ===
- Aosta - Martigny
  - 1477 Swiss ally Valais conquers Martigny, border between Switzerland and Savoy.
  - 1860 Italian unification.
- Valtournenche - Zermatt
  - 1416 Valais allies with Switzerland, border between Switzerland and Savoy.
  - 1860 Italian unification.
- Domodossola - Brig
  - 1st millennium, border between Italy and Burgundy.
  - 1416 Valais allies with Switzerland, border between Switzerland and Milan.
  - 1860 Italian unification.
- From Domodossola - Locarno to Porlezza - Lugano
  - 1512 after Swiss conquest of Milan, border between Switzerland and Milan.
  - 1860 Italian unification.
- From Madesimo - Splügen to Livigno - Zernez
  - 1st millennium, border between Italy and the Frankish Empire.
  - 1497/1498 Grissons allies with Switzerland, border between Switzerland and Milan.
  - 1860 Italian unification.
- Taufers im Münstertal - Müstair
  - 1497/1498 Grissons allies with Switzerland, border between Switzerland and the Habsburg territories.
  - 1919 at the Treaty of Saint-Germain.

=== Italy–Vatican City ===
  - 1929 Lateran Treaty

=== Latvia–Lithuania ===
  - 1236 Lithuanian state established, border between Lithuania and other Balts.
  - 1918 Lithuanian and Latvian independence.

=== Lithuania–Belarus ===
  - 1991 Belarusian and Lithuanian independence.

=== Lithuania–Poland ===
  - 1919 at the Treaty of Versailles.

=== Lithuania–Russia ===
- Kybartai - Gusev
  - 13th century, border between Lithuania and the Baltic Prussians.
  - 1991 dissolution of the Soviet Union.
- Tauragė - Sovetsk
  - 1923 after Lithuanian annexation, border between Lithuania and Germany.
  - 1991 dissolution of the Soviet Union.

=== Latvia–Russia ===
- Rēzekne - Pskov
  - 1510, Russian conquest of Pskov, border between Russia and the German Order.
  - 1991 dissolution of the Soviet Union.
- Rēzekne - Sebez
  - 1920 peace between Latvia and the Soviet Union.
  - 1991 dissolution of the Soviet Union.

=== Liechtenstein–Switzerland ===
- Vaduz - Igis
  - 1497/1498 Grissons allies with Switzerland, border between Switzerland and Brandis.
  - 1719 Creation of Liechtenstein.
- Vaduz - Mels
  - 1436 Inhabitants of Sargans become citizens of Swiss Zürich, border between Switzerland and Brandis.
  - 1719 Creation of Liechtenstein.
- Vaduz - Buchs
  - 1485 Swiss Luzern buys Werdenberg, border between Switzerland and Brandis.
  - 1719 Creation of Liechtenstein.
- Bendern - Salez
  - 1458 Lords of Sax-Forstegg ally with Switzerland, border between Switzerland and Brandis.
  - 1719 Creation of Liechtenstein.

=== Moldova–Romania ===
- Bălți - Iași
  - 1859 formation of Romania, border between Romania and Russia.
  - 1991 Moldovan independence.
- Cahul - Brăila
  - 1878 after Russian annexation of Southern Bessarabia, border between Romania and Russia.
  - 1991 Moldovan independence.

=== Moldova–Ukraine ===
  - 1991 Moldovan and Ukrainian independence.

=== Montenegro–Serbia ===
  - 1913 at the Treaty of London.

=== North Macedonia–Serbia ===
  - 1945 Inner borders of DF Yugoslavia

=== Norway–Russia ===
  - 1826 borders fixed between Russia and Norway (Sweden acted on behalf of Norway in international affairs during the union).

=== Norway–Sweden ===
- Against Bohuslän (from The Iddefjord to near a line between Halden - Ed)
  - 1658 at the Treaty of Roskilde ending the Second Northern War, border between Sweden and Denmark-Norway.
- From Halden - Ed to around Trysil - Särna
  - probably 10th and 11th centuries
- From Trysil - Särna to around Gäddede
  - 1645 at the Treaty of Brömsebro ending the Torstenson War, new border between Sweden and Denmark-Norway. Disputed near Gäddede.
- North of Gäddede
  - 16th century, the drainage divide line between the Atlantic and the Baltic was used as approximate border between Sweden and Denmark-Norway.
- Precisely defined by Stromstad Treaty of 1751, after which border cairns were erected.
- 1809, the part now belonging to Finland was ceded from Sweden to Russia and therefore was no longer part of the Norway–Sweden border.

=== Poland–Slovakia ===
  - 10th/11th century, border between Poland and Hungary.

=== Poland–Russia ===
  - 1945 Stalin divides German East Prussia, border between Poland and the Soviet Union.

=== Poland–Ukraine ===
- From Chełm - Kovel to Przemyśl - Sambir
  - 1945 after the annexation of East Poland by Stalin, border between Poland and the Soviet Union.
  - 1991 Ukrainian independence.
- Kremenaros-Krzemieniec - Uzhok Pass
  - 11th century, border between Poland and Hungary.
  - 1991 Ukrainian independence.

=== Portugal–Spain ===
- From Faro - Huelva to Portalegre - Cáceres
  - 12th/13th century, conquered by Portugal, border between Portugal and León/Castile.
  - 1479 Union between Castile and Aragon, the beginning of Spain.
- From Guarda - Salamanca to Braga - Vigo
  - 1139 Portugal becomes independent from León-Castile, border between Portugal and León-Castile.
  - 1479 Union between Castile and Aragon, the beginning of Spain.
  - 1864 Treaty of Lisbon sets border.

=== Romania–Ukraine ===
- Sighetu Marmației - Khust
  - 1919 at the Treaty of Versailles, border between Romania and Czechoslovakia/Polish or Ukrainian East Galicia.
  - 1991 Ukrainian independence.
- Suceava - Chernivtsi
  - 1940/1944 border between Romania and the Soviet Union.
  - 1991 Ukrainian independence.
- Brăila - Izmail
  - 1878 Romanian annexation of Dobruja, border between Romania and Russia.
  - 1991 Ukrainian independence.

=== Romania–Serbia ===
- Drobeta-Turnu Severin - Negotin
  - 1284 after Serbian conquest, border between Serbia and Hungary.
  - 1859 formation of Romania, border between Romania and Ottoman Empire.
  - 1878 Serbian independence.
- Anina - Bor
  - 1284 after Serbian conquest, border between Serbia and Hungary.
  - 1920 at the Treaty of Trianon, border between Romania and Yugoslavia.
  - 2006 Serbian self-determination.
- Timișoara - Belgrade
  - 1920 at the Treaty of Trianon, border between Romania and Yugoslavia.
  - 2006 Serbian self-determination.

=== Russia–Ukraine ===
  - 1991 dissolution of the Soviet Union.

=== Slovakia–Ukraine ===
  - 1991 Ukrainian independence, border between Ukraine and Czechoslovakia.
  - 1993 Slovakian independence.

=== Spain–UK ===
- La Línea de la Concepción - Gibraltar
  - 1713 at the Treaty of Utrecht ending the War of the Spanish Succession, border between Spain and Great Britain (United Kingdom).

== Asia ==
=== Afghanistan–China ===
  - 18th century

=== Afghanistan–Iran ===
  - 1857 Great Britain establishes the border between Persia (Iran) and Afghanistan after the Iranian defeat during the Anglo-Persian War

=== Afghanistan–Pakistan ===
  - 1919 Afghanistan becomes independent from the British Empire, border between Afghanistan and the British Empire
  - 1947 Pakistan becomes independent from the United Kingdom

=== Afghanistan–Tajikistan ===
  - 1885 After Russian conquest of Panjdeh, border between Afghanistan and Russia
  - 1991 Tajikistani independence

=== Afghanistan–Turkmenistan ===
  - 1885 After Russian conquest, border between Afghanistan and Russia
  - 1991 Turkmenistani independence

=== Afghanistan–Uzbekistan ===
  - 1885 After Russian conquest, border between Afghanistan and Russia
  - 1991 Uzbekistani independence

=== Armenia–Azerbaijan ===
  - 1991 Armenian and Azerbaijani independence.

=== Armenia–Georgia ===
  - 1991 Armenian and Georgian independence.

=== Armenia–Turkey ===
  - 1921 at the Treaty of Kars, border between Turkey and the Soviet Union.
  - 1991 Armenian independence.

=== Azerbaijan–Iran ===
- Lankaran - Ardabil
  - 1828 at the Treaty of Turkmenchay, border between Russia and Persia (Iran).
  - 1991 Azerbaijani independence.
- Stepanakert - Tabriz
  - 1813 at the Treaty of Gulistan ending the Russo-Persian War, border between Russia and Persia (Iran).
  - 1991 Azerbaijani independence.
- Nakhchivan - Tabriz
  - 1828 at the Treaty of Turkmenchay, border between Russia and Persia (Iran).
  - 1991 Azerbaijani independence.

=== Azerbaijan–Turkey ===
  - 1921 at the Treaty of Kars, border between Turkey and the Soviet Union.
  - 1991 Azerbaijani independence.

=== Bangladesh–Burma ===
- Chittagong–Mandalay
  - 1558 Burma conquers Manipur, border between Burma and Arakan
  - 1971 Bangladesh becomes independent from Pakistan
- Chittagong–Sittwe
  - 1784 Burma conquers Arakan, border between Burma and Great Britain
  - 1971 Bangladesh becomes independent from Pakistan

=== Bangladesh–India ===
  - 1947 Indian independence from the United Kingdom, border between India and Pakistan
  - 1971 Bangladesh becomes independent from Pakistan after the Bangladesh Liberation War.

=== Bhutan–India ===
  - 1616 Bhutan becomes independent from Tibet, border between Bhutan and the Kamata Kingdom
  - 1947 Indian independence

=== Bhutan–China ===
  - 1616 Bhutan becomes independent from Tibet, border between Bhutan and Tibet
  - 1724 China conquers Tibet from the Dzungars

=== Brunei–Malaysia ===
  - 1963 Establishment of Malaysia, border between the British protectorate of Brunei and Malaysia
  - 1984 End of the British protectorate

=== Burma–India ===
  - 1826 Treaty of Yandabo, Border between Burma and the United Kingdom
  - 1947 Indian independence, border between India and the United Kingdom
  - 1948 Burmese independence

=== Burma–China ===
- Myitkyina–Dsayul
  - 11th century, Pagan establishes Burma, border between Burma and the Tibetans
  - 1724 China conquers Tibet from the Dzungars
- Myitkyina–Baoshan
  - 109 BC, China conquers the Dian kingdom, border between China and the Mon people
  - 11th century, Pagan establishes Burma, border between Burma and Dali
  - 1555 Burma conquers Upper Burma
  - 1769 Last Chinese invasion
- From Lashio–Baoshan to Kengtung–Simao
  - 109 BC, China conquers the Dian Kingdom, border between China and the Mon people
  - 1557 Burma conquers the Shan States
  - 1769 Last Chinese invasion

=== Burma–Thailand ===
- Kengtung–Chang Mai
  - 1557 Pagan (Burma) conquers the Shan states, border between Burma and Chiang Mai
  - 1774 Thailand conquers Chiang Mai from Burma
- Rangoon–Chang Mai
  - 1530s or 1540s, Burma is established out of several small states, border between Burma and Chiang Mai
  - 1774 Thailand conquers Chiang Mai from Burma
- Tavoy–Bangkok
  - 1057 Thaton is conquered by Pagan (Burma), border between Pagan (Burma) and the Khmer Empire
  - 16th-18th century, Burma conquers the Mon kingdoms

=== Cambodia–Laos ===
  - 1353 Lan Xang (Laos) becomes independent from the Khmer Empire (Cambodia)

=== Cambodia–Thailand ===
- Phnom Penh–Udon Thani
  - 1353 Lan Xang (Laos) becomes independent from the Khmer Empire (Cambodia), Border between the Khmer Empire and Lan Xang
  - 15th or 16th century, Ayutthaya Kingdom (Thailand) conquers western Lan Xang
- Phnom Penh–Bangkok
  - 14th/15th century, Ayutthaya Kingdom (Thailand) conquers the western part of the Khmer Empire (Cambodia)

=== Cambodia–Vietnam ===
  - 1953 Cambodia becomes independent from France, border between Cambodia and France
  - 1975 North Vietnam and South Vietnam are re-unified

=== China–Laos ===
  - 109 BC, China conquers the Dian Kingdom, border between China and the Mon people
  - 1353 Establishment of the kingdom of Lan Xang, border between Lan Xang (Laos) and the Mongolian Empire
  - 1381 Ming China conquers Yunnan from Yuan (Mongolian) loyalists

=== China–Pakistan ===
  - 1963 Trans-Karakoram Treaty

=== China–India ===
- Shahidulla Mazar–Leh
  - 1984 After Indian offensive against Pakistan on Siachen Glacier at 5,000 meters above sea level, disputed
- Gartog–Leh
  - 1962 Disputed, cease fire
- Gartog–Shimla
  - 1724 China conquers Tibet from the Dzungars, border between China and the Mughal Empire
  - 1947 Indian independence, border between India and Tibet
  - 1951 Tibet cedes de facto sovereignty to the People's Republic of China
- Khampa Dsong–Gangtok
  - 1724 China conquers Tibet from the Dzungars, border between China and Sikkim
  - 1947 Indian independence, border between India and Tibet
  - 1951 Conquest of Tibet by China
- Lhasa–Tinsukia
  - 1947 Indian independence, border between India and Tibet
  - 1951 Conquest of Tibet by China

=== China–Kazakhstan ===
  - 1881 at the Treaty of Saint Petersburg, border between China and Russia.
  - 1991 Kazakhstani independence.

=== China–Kyrgyzstan ===
  - 1881 At the Treaty of Saint Petersburg, border between China and Russia
  - 1991 Kyrgyzstani independence

=== China–Mongolia ===
  - 1911 Mongolian independence.

=== China–Nepal ===
  - 1724 China conquers Tibet from the Dzungars, border between China and the Nepalese kingdoms
  - 1768 The king of Gorkha unites all Nepalese kingdoms into one

=== China–North Korea ===
  - 1895/1910 after Japanese conquest, border between China and Japan.
  - 1945/1948 North Korean independence.

=== China–Tajikistan ===
  - 1757 China conquers Sinkiang, border between Bukhara and China
  - 1991 Tajikistani independence

=== China–Russia ===
- From Mudanjiang - Vladivostok to Mohe - Never
  - 1858 at the Treaty of Aigun.
- Manzouli - Krasnokamensk
  - 1689 at the Treaty of Nerchinsk.
- Altay - Gorno-Altaysk
  - 1755, China acquires the Ili-basin, border between China and the Altays.
  - 1758, Russia acquires part of the Altay territory.

=== China–Vietnam ===
- Malipo–Hanoi
  - 1st millennium BC?, border between Văn Lang (Vietnam) and the Dian Kingdom
  - 938, Vietnam becomes independent from China
- Nanning–Hanoi
  - 1st millennium BC?, border of Văn Lang (Vietnam)
  - 214 BC, China conquers Guangxi

=== East Timor–Indonesia ===
  - 1949 Indonesia becomes independent from the Netherlands, border between Indonesia and Portugal
  - 2002 East Timor becomes independent from Indonesia

=== Egypt–Israel ===
  - 1841 The United Kingdom forces Egypt to retreat from the Levant, border between Egypt and the Ottoman Empire
  - 1948 Israeli independence

=== Egypt–Palestine (Gaza) ===
  - 1841 The United Kingdom forces Egypt to retreat from the Levant, border between Egypt and the Ottoman Empire
  - 1988 Palestine declaration, Egyptian withdrawal from Gaza
  - 1977 Egyptian recognition of Israel

=== Georgia–Turkey ===
  - 1921 at the Treaty of Kars, border between Turkey and the Soviet Union.
  - 1991 Georgian independence.

=== India–Nepal ===
- Siliguri–Kathmandu
  - 1923 The British Empire recognizes the independence of Nepal, border between Nepal and the British Empire
  - 1947 Indian independence from the United Kingdom
- Patna–Kathmandu
  - 1768 The king of Gorkha unites all Nepalese kingdoms into one, border between Nepal and Great Britain
  - 1947 Indian independence from the United Kingdom
- Gorakhpur–Kathmandu
  - 1768 The king of Gorkha unites all Nepalese kingdoms into one, border between Nepal and the Mughal Empire
  - 1947 Indian independence from the United Kingdom
- Delhi–Kathmandu
  - 1923 The British Empire recognizes the independence of Nepal, border between Nepal and the British Empire
  - 1947 Indian independence from the United Kingdom

=== India–Pakistan ===
- Siachen Glacier
  - 1984 After Indian offensive on a glacier at 5,000 meters above sea level
- From Srinagar–Skardu to Ahmedabad–Karachi
  - 1947 Partition of India into two Dominions India and Pakistan following the Indian independence act and cease fire line of the war between India and Pakistan on Kashmir.

=== Indonesia–Malaysia ===
  - 1949 Indonesia becomes independent from the Netherlands, border between Indonesia and the United Kingdom
  - 1963 Establishment of Malaysia

=== Iran–Iraq ===
  - 16th century, border between Persia (Iran) and the Ottoman Empire
  - 1932 Iraqi independence

=== Iran–Pakistan ===
  - 1872 Border agreement between Persia (Iran) and the British Empire
  - 1947 Pakistan becomes independent from the United Kingdom

=== Iran–Turkey ===
  - 16th century, border between Persia (Iran) and the Ottoman Empire (Turkey).

=== Iran–Turkmenistan ===
  - 1885 After Russian conquest of Merv, border between Iran and Russia
  - 1991 Turkmenistani independence

=== Iraq–Jordan ===
  - 1932 Iraqi independence, border between Iraq and the British League of Nations mandate of Palestine
  - 1946 Jordanian independence

=== Iraq–Kuwait ===
  - 1932 Iraqi independence, border between Iraq and the British protectorate of Kuwait
  - 1961 Kuwaiti independence

=== Iraq–Saudi Arabia ===
- Baghdad–Al-Jawf
  - 1926 Unification of Nejd and Hijaz, border between Saudi Arabia and the British League of Nations mandate of Iraq
  - 1932 Iraqi independence
- Nasiriyah–Ar Riyad
  - 1975/1991 The Saudi-Iraqi neutral zone is split in two parts

=== Iraq–Syria ===
  - 1932 Iraqi independence, border between Iraq and the French League of Nations mandate of Syria
  - 1944 Syrian independence

=== Iraq–Turkey ===
  - 1923 at the Treaty of Lausanne, border between Turkey and the British League of Nations mandate of Iraq.
  - 1932 Iraqi independence.

=== Israel–Syria ===
  - 1944 Syrian independence, border between Syria and the British League of Nations mandate of Palestine
  - 1948 Israeli independence

=== Israel-Palestine (West Bank, East Jerusalem) ===
  - 1988 Palestine Declaration of Independence
  - 1993 Oslo Accords between Israel and Palestine (PLO)
  - 1948 Israel independence

=== Israel–Jordan ===
- Hefa–Irbid
  - 1047 BC, border between Israel and Aram Damascus
  - 1946 Jordanian independence, border between Jordan and the British United Nations mandate of Palestine
  - 1948 Israeli independence
- From Beersheba–Ma'an to Eilat–Al-'Aqabah
  - 1946 Jordanian independence, border between Jordan and the British United Nations mandate of Palestine
  - 1948 Israeli independence

=== Jordan–Syria ===
  - 1944 Syrian independence, border between Syria and the British League of Nations mandate of Palestine
  - 1946 Jordanian independence

=== Jordan–Saudi Arabia ===
  - 1926 Unification of Nejd and Hijaz, border between Saudi Arabia and the British League of Nations mandate of Palestine
  - 1946 Independence of Jordan

=== Jordan-Palestine (West bank) ===
  - 1988 Jordanian withdrawal from West Bank, Palestinian independence declaration
  - 1946 Jordanian independence
  - 1994 Jordanian recognition of Israel

=== Kazakhstan–Kyrgyzstan ===
  - 1991 Kazakhstani and Kyrgyzstani independence.

=== Kazakhstan–Russia ===
  - 1991 dissolution of the Soviet Union.

=== Kazakhstan–Turkmenistan ===
  - 1991 Kazakhstani and Turkmenistani independence.

=== Kazakhstan–Uzbekistan ===
  - 1991 Kazakhstani and Uzbekistani independence.

=== Kuwait–Saudi Arabia ===
- Al-Kuwayt–Al-Hafar al-Batin
  - 1926 Unification of Nejd and Hijaz, border between Saudi Arabia and the British protectorate of Kuwait
  - 1961 Kuwaiti independence
- Al-Kuwayt–Dammam
  - 1970 The Saudi-Kuwaiti neutral zone is split in two parts

=== Kyrgyzstan–Tajikistan ===
  - 1991 Kyrgyzstani and Tajikistani independence

=== Kyrgyzstan–Uzbekistan ===
  - 1991 Kyrgyzstani and Uzbekistani independence

=== Laos–Burma ===
  - 1353 Establishment of Lan Xang (Laos), border between Lan Xang and the Shan states
  - 1557 Burma conquers the Shan States

=== Laos–Thailand ===
- Luang Prabang–Chiang Mai
  - 1353 Establishment of Lan Xang (Laos), border between Lan Xang (Laos) and Lanna
  - 1774 Lanna is conquered by Thailand, border between Thailand and Luang Prabang
  - 1954 Laos becomes independent from France
- Vientiane–Nakhon Ratchasima
  - 1893 France conquers Vientiane from Thailand, border between Thailand and France
  - 1954 Laos becomes independent from France

=== Laos–Vietnam ===
- Phong Saly–Lai Châu
  - 1st millennium BC, border between Văn Lang (Vietnam) and the Mon people
  - 1353 Establishment of Lan Xang (Laos)
- Luang Prabang–Hanoi
  - 938 Vietnamese independence from China, border between Vietnam and the Tai
  - 1353 Establishment of Lan Xang (Laos)
- Vientiane–Xa-doai
  - 938 Vietnamese independence from China, border between Vietnam and the Khmer Empire
  - 1353 Establishment of Lan Xang (Laos)
- Chamrap–Ða Nang
  - 1353 Establishment of Lan Xang (Laos), border between Lan Xang and Champa
  - 1475 Vietnam conquers northern Champa

=== Lebanon–Syria ===
  - 1941/1943 Lebanese independence, border between Lebanon and the French League of Nations mandate of Syria
  - 1944 Syrian independence

=== Lebanon–Israel ===
  - 1941/1943 Lebanese independence, border between Lebanon and the British League of Nations mandate of Palestine
  - 1948 Israeli independence

=== Malaysia–Singapore ===
  - 1965 Singapore becomes independent from Malaysia (land connection via causeways)

=== Malaysia–Thailand ===
  - 1909 Treaty of Bangkok, border between Thailand and the British Empire
  - 1963 Establishment of Malaysia

=== Mongolia–Russia ===
- From Choibalsan - Krasnokamensk to Mörön - Tulun
  - 1727 at the Treaty of Kyakhta, border between Russia and China.
  - 1911 Mongolian independence.
- From Mörön - Kyzyl to Ulaangom - Kyzyl
  - 1912/1944 Russia annexes Tuva.
- Ölgij - Gorno-Altaysk
  - 1758, Russia acquires part of the Altay territory, border between China and Russia.
  - 1911 Mongolian independence.

=== North Korea–South Korea ===
  - 1953 after ceasefire.

=== North Korea–Russia ===
  - 1858 at the Treaty of Aigun, border between Russia and China.
  - 1948 Creation of North Korea, border between North Korea and the Soviet Union.
  - 1991 Russian self-determination.

=== Oman–Saudi Arabia ===
  - 1990 Border agreement

=== Oman–United Arab Emirates ===
- Khasab–Dubai
  - 1971 The United Arab Emirates and Oman become independent from the United Kingdom
- Shinas–Dubai
  - 1971 The United Arab Emirates and Oman become independent from the United Kingdom
- Al Buraymi–Abu Zabi
  - 1971 The United Arab Emirates and Oman become independent from the United Kingdom
  - 1999 Border dispute on Al-Buraymi resolved

=== Oman–Yemen ===
  - 1971 Omani independence, border between Oman and South Yemen
  - 1990 North Yemen and South Yemen are unified
  - 1992 Border dispute between Oman and Yemen settled about Habarut

=== Saudi Arabia–Qatar ===
  - 2009 Signed at the UN headquarters

=== Saudi Arabia–United Arab Emirates ===
  - 1974 Treaty of Jeddah, disputed

=== Saudi Arabia–Yemen ===
- Ar Riyad–Mukalla
  - 1926 Unification of Nejd and Hijaz, border between Saudi Arabia and the British protectorate of Aden
  - 1990 Unification of South Yemen and North Yemen
- Jizan–San'a
  - 1934 Treaty of Taif, border between Saudi Arabia and (North) Yemen

=== Syria–Turkey ===
- From Nusaybin - Cizre to Aleppo - Gaziantep
  - 1923 at the Treaty of Lausanne, border between Turkey and the French League of Nations mandate of Syria.
  - 1944 Syrian independence.
- Aleppo - Antakya
  - 1939 after referendum, border between Turkey and the French League of Nations mandate of Syria.
  - 1944 Syrian independence.

=== Tajikistan–Uzbekistan ===
  - 1991 Tajikistani and Uzbekistani independence

=== Turkmenistan–Uzbekistan ===
  - 1991 Turkmenistani and Uzbekistani independence

== Oceania ==
=== Indonesia–Papua New Guinea ===
  - 1969 The Netherlands cedes Papua to Indonesia, border between Indonesia and Australia
  - 1975 Papua New Guinea becomes independent from Australia

== Africa ==
=== Algeria–Libya ===
  - 1951 Libya becomes independent, border between Libya and France
  - 1962 Algeria becomes independent

=== Algeria–Mali ===
  - 1960 Mali becomes independent, border between Mali and France
  - 1962 Algeria becomes independent

=== Algeria–Mauritania ===
  - 1960 Mauritania becomes independent, border between Mauritania and France
  - 1962 Algeria becomes independent

=== Algeria–Morocco ===
- Tlemcen–Oujda
  - 1554 Morocco is established after a merger of small states, border between Saadi Sultanat and the Regency Of Algiers
  - 1710 Algiers (Algeria) becomes independent
- Béchar–Casablanca
  - 1844 Border between France and Alaouite Sultanate established after a war
  - 1962 Algerian independence, Algerian borders has shrunk from Moulouya river to Kiss river

=== Algeria–Niger ===
  - 1960 Niger becomes independent, border between Niger and France
  - 1962 Algeria becomes independent

=== Algeria–Tunisia ===
  - 1956 Tunisia becomes independent, border between Tunisia and France
  - 1962 Algeria becomes independent

=== Angola–Democratic Republic of the Congo ===
  - 1960 Congolese independence, border between Congo-Léopoldville (DRC) and Portugal
  - 1975 Angola becomes independent

=== Angola–Namibia ===
  - 1975 Angola becomes independent, border between Angola and South Africa
  - 1990 Namibia becomes independent

=== Angola–Republic of the Congo ===
  - 1960 Congolese independence, border between Congo-Brazzaville (RC) and Portugal
  - 1975 Angola becomes independent

=== Angola–Zambia ===
  - 1964 Zambia becomes independent, border between Zambia and Portugal
  - 1975 Angola becomes independent

=== Benin–Burkina Faso ===
  - 1960 Independence for Benin and Burkina Faso

=== Benin–Niger ===
  - 1960 Independence for Benin and Niger

=== Benin–Nigeria ===
  - 1960 Independence for Benin and Nigeria

=== Burkina Faso–Togo ===
  - 1960 Independence for Burkina Faso and Togo

=== Burkina Faso–Ghana ===
  - 1957 Ghana becomes independent, border between Ghana and France
  - 1960 Togo becomes independent

=== Burkina Faso–Côte d'Ivoire ===
  - 1960 Independence for Burkina Faso and Côte d'Ivoire

=== Burkina Faso–Mali ===
  - 1960 Independence for Burkina Faso and Mali

=== Burkina Faso–Niger ===
  - 1960 Independence for Burkina Faso and Niger

=== Botswana–South Africa ===
  - 1931 South Africa becomes independent, border between South Africa and the United Kingdom
  - 1966 Botswana becomes independent

=== Botswana–Zimbabwe ===
  - 1966 Botswana becomes independent, border between Botswana and Rhodesia
  - 1980 Zimbabwe becomes independent

=== Botswana–Namibia ===
  - 1966 Botswana becomes independent, border between Botswana and South Africa
  - 1990 Namibia becomes independent

=== Burundi–Democratic Republic of the Congo ===
  - 16th century, Establishment of Burundi, border of Burundi
  - 1960 Congolese independence, border between Congo-Léopoldville (DRC) and Belgium
  - 1962 Burundi becomes independent

=== Burundi–Rwanda ===
  - 2nd Millennium, Establishment of Burundi and Rwanda
  - 1962 Burundi and Rwanda become independent from Belgium

=== Burundi–Tanzania ===
  - 16th century, Establishment of Burundi, border of Burundi
  - 1962 Burundi becomes independent, border between Burundi and Tanganyika
  - 1964 Establishment of Tanzania after a merger between Tanganyika and Zanzibar

=== Cameroon–Central African Republic ===
  - 1960 Independence for Cameroon and the Central African Republic

=== Cameroon–Republic of the Congo ===
  - 1960 Independence for Cameroon and Congo-Brazzaville (RC)

=== Central African Republic–Republic of the Congo ===
  - 1960 Central African and Congolese independence

=== Central African Republic–Democratic Republic of the Congo ===
  - 1960 Central African and Congolese independence

=== Central African Republic–Chad ===
  - 1960 Independence for the Central African Republic and Chad

=== Cameroon–Gabon ===
  - 1960 Independence for Cameroon and Gabon

=== Cameroon–Equatorial Guinea ===
  - 1960 Cameroon becomes independent, border between Cameroon and Spain
  - 1968 Equatorial Guinea becomes independent

=== Cameroon–Chad ===
  - 1960 Independence for Cameroon and Chad

=== Cameroon–Nigeria ===
- Garoua–Maiduguri
  - 1960 Cameroon becomes independent, border between Cameroon and the British United Nations mandate of Cameroons
  - 1961 Northern Cameroons votes to become part of Nigeria
- Bamenda–Yola
  - 1961 After a referendum it is decided that Northern Cameroons becomes part of Nigeria and Southern Cameroons part of Cameroon
- Douala–Calabar
  - 1960 Nigerian independence, border between Nigeria and the British United Nations mandate of Cameroons
  - 1961 Southern Cameroons votes to become part of Cameroon

=== Chad–Libya ===
  - 1951 Libya becomes independent, border between Libya and France
  - 1960 Chad becomes independent

=== Chad–Niger ===
  - 1960 Independence for Chad and Niger

=== Chad–Nigeria ===
  - 1980s, Lake Chad nearly dried up, border of Chad and Nigeria becomes a land border

=== Central African Republic–Sudan ===
  - 1956 Sudanese independence from the United Kingdom and Egypt, border between Sudan and France
  - 1960 The Central African Republic becomes independent

=== Chad–Sudan ===
  - 1956 Sudanese independence from the United Kingdom and Egypt, border between Sudan and France
  - 1960 Chad becomes independent

=== Côte d'Ivoire–Mali ===
  - 1960 Independence for Côte d'Ivoire and Mali

=== Côte d'Ivoire–Guinea ===
  - 1958 Guinea becomes independent, border between Guinea and France
  - 1960 Côte d'Ivoire becomes independent

=== Côte d'Ivoire–Liberia ===
- San Pédro–Harper
  - 1857 The Republic of Maryland joins Liberia, border of Liberia
  - 1960 Côte d'Ivoire becomes independent
- Man–Zwedru
  - 1892 Border agreement between Liberia and France
  - 1960 Côte d'Ivoire becomes independent

=== Democratic Republic of the Congo–Sudan ===
  - 1956 Sudanese independence from the United Kingdom and Egypt, border between Sudan and Belgium
  - 1960 Congolese independence

=== Democratic Republic of the Congo–Republic of the Congo ===
  - 1960 Independence for both Congo's, both named Republic of the Congo at the time

=== Democratic Republic of the Congo–Rwanda ===
  - 2nd Millennium, Establishment of Rwanda, border of Rwanda
  - 1960 Congolese independence, border between Congo-Léopoldville (DRC) and Belgium
  - 1962 Rwanda becomes independent

=== Democratic Republic of the Congo–Uganda ===
  - 1960 Congolese independence, border between Congo-Léopoldville (DRC) and the United Kingdom
  - 1962 Uganda becomes independent

=== Democratic Republic of the Congo–Zambia ===
  - 1960 Congolese independence, border between Congo-Léopoldville (DRC) and the United Kingdom
  - 1964 Zambia becomes independent

=== Djibouti–Eritrea ===
  - 1977 Djibouti becomes independent, border between Djibouti and Ethiopia
  - 1991 Eritrean independence

=== Djibouti–Ethiopia ===
  - 1897 Border established between Abyssinia (Ethiopia) and France
  - 1977 Djibouti becomes independent

=== Djibouti–Somalia ===
  - 1960 Somalian independence, border between Somalia and France
  - 1977 Djibouti becomes independent

=== Egypt–Libya ===
  - 1922 Egyptian independence, border between Egypt and Italy (Italian Libya)
  - 1951 Libyan independence

=== Egypt–Sudan ===
  - 1956 Sudanese independence from the United Kingdom and Egypt

=== Equatorial Guinea–Gabon ===
  - 1960 Gabon becomes independent, border between Gabon and Spain
  - 1968 Equatorial Guinea becomes independent

=== Eritrea–Sudan ===
  - 1956 Sudanese independence from the United Kingdom and Egypt, border between Sudan and Ethiopia
  - 1991 Eritrean independence

=== Eritrea–Ethiopia ===
  - 1900/1902/1908 Border established between Abyssinia (Ethiopia) and Italy
  - 1991 Eritrean independence after the Ethiopian Civil War

=== Ethiopia–Kenya ===
  - 1907 Border agreement between Abyssinia (Ethiopia) and the British Empire
  - 1963 Kenya becomes independent

=== Ethiopia–Sudan ===
  - 1902 Border between Abyssinia (Ethiopia) and the United Kingdom established
  - 1956 Sudanese independence from the United Kingdom and Egypt, border between Sudan and Ethiopia

=== Ethiopia–Somalia ===
- Harar–Hargeysa
  - 1897 Anglo-Egyptian Treaty, border between Abyssinia (Ethiopia) and the British Empire
  - 1960 Somalian independence
- Adis Abeba–Muqdisho
  - 1897 Border agreement between Abyssinia (Ethiopia) and Italy
  - 1960 Somalian independence

=== Gabon–Republic of the Congo ===
  - 1960 Independence for Gabon and Congo-Brazzaville (RC)

=== The Gambia–Senegal ===
  - 1960 Senegal becomes independent, border between Senegal and the United Kingdom
  - 1965 The Gambia becomes independent

=== Ghana–Togo ===
  - 1957 Ghana becomes independent, border between Ghana and the French United Nations mandate of Togoland
  - 1960 Togo becomes independent

=== Ghana–Côte d'Ivoire ===
  - 1957 Ghana becomes independent, border between Ghana and France
  - 1960 Côte d'Ivoire becomes independent

=== Guinea–Liberia ===
  - 1892 Border agreement between Liberia and France
  - 1958 Guinea becomes independent

=== Guinea–Sierra Leone ===
  - 1958 Guinea becomes independent, border between Guinea and the United Kingdom
  - 1961 Sierra Leone becomes independent

=== Guinea–Mali ===
  - 1958 Guinea becomes independent, border between Guinea and France
  - 1960 Mali becomes independent

=== Guinea–Senegal ===
  - 1958 Guinea becomes independent, border between Guinea and France
  - 1960 Senegal becomes independent

=== Guinea–Guinea-Bissau ===
  - 1958 Guinea becomes independent, border between Guinea and Portugal
  - 1973/1974 Guinea-Bissau becomes independent

=== Guinea-Bissau–Senegal ===
  - 1960 Senegal becomes independent, border between Senegal and Portugal
  - 1973/1974 Guinea-Bissau becomes independent

=== Kenya–Sudan ===
  - 1956 Sudanese independence from the United Kingdom and Egypt, border between Sudan and the United Kingdom
  - 1963 Kenya becomes independent

=== Kenya–Somalia ===
  - 1960 Somalian independence, border between Somalia and the United Kingdom
  - 1963 Kenya becomes independent

=== Kenya–Uganda ===
  - 1962 Uganda becomes independent, border between Uganda and the United Kingdom
  - 1963 Kenya becomes independent

=== Kenya–Tanzania ===
  - 1963 Kenya becomes independent, border between Kenya and Tanganyika
  - 1964 Establishment of Tanzania after a merger between Tanganyika and Zanzibar

=== Lesotho–South Africa ===
- Maseru–Pietermaritzburg
  - 1822 Establishment of Basutoland (Lesotho), border between Basutoland and the Zulu Kingdom
  - 1931 South Africa becomes independent, border between South Africa and the United Kingdom
  - 1966 Lesotho becomes independent.
- Maseru–East London
  - 1822 Establishment of Basutoland (Lesotho), border between Basutoland and the Xhosa
  - 1931 South Africa becomes independent, border between South Africa and the United Kingdom
  - 1966 Lesotho becomes independent
- Maseru–Bloemfontein
  - 1931 South Africa becomes independent, border between South Africa and the United Kingdom
  - 1966 Lesotho becomes independent

=== Libya–Niger ===
  - 1951 Libyan independence, border between Libya and France
  - 1960 Niger becomes independent

=== Libya–Sudan ===
  - 1951 Libyan independence, border between Libya and the United Kingdom
  - 1956 Sudanese independence from the United Kingdom and Egypt

=== Libya–Tunisia ===
  - 1951 Libya becomes independent, border between Libya and France
  - 1956 Tunisia becomes independent

=== Liberia–Sierra Leone ===
- Robertsport–Freetown
  - 1847 Liberia becomes independent from the United States, border of Liberia
  - 1961 Sierra Leone becomes independent
- Voinjama–Koidu
  - 1885 Border agreement between Liberia and the British Empire
  - 1961 Sierra Leone becomes independent

=== Mali–Senegal ===
  - 1960 Independence for Mali and Senegal

=== Mali–Mauritania ===
  - 1960 Independence for Mali and Mauritania

=== Malawi–Mozambique ===
  - 1964 Malawi becomes independent, border between Malawi and Portugal

=== Mali–Niger ===
  - 1960 Independence for Mali and Niger

=== Malawi–Tanzania ===
  - 1964 Establishment of Tanzania after a merger between Tanganyika and Zanzibar and the independence of Malawi

=== Malawi–Zambia ===
  - 1964 Malawi and Zambia becomes independent

=== Mauritania–Senegal ===
  - 1960 Independence for Mauritania and Senegal

=== Morocco–Spain ===
- Nador - Melilla
  - 1894 borders between Morocco and Melilla were fixed.
- Tanger - Ceuta
  - 17th century.

=== Mozambique–South Africa ===
  - 1931 South Africa becomes independent, border between South Africa and Portugal
  - 1975 Mozambique becomes independent from the Portuguese Empire.

=== Mozambique–Swaziland ===
  - 1830s, Swaziland is moved up north in order to reduce the pressure from the Zulus, border between Swaziland and Portugal
  - 1975 Mozambique becomes independent

=== Mozambique–Tanzania ===
  - 1964 Establishment of Tanzania after a merger between Tanganyika and Zanzibar, border between Tanzania and Portugal
  - Mozambique becomes independent

=== Mozambique–Zambia ===
  - 1964 Zambia becomes independent, border between Zambia and Portugal
  - 1975 Mozambique becomes independent

=== Mozambique–Zimbabwe ===
  - 1975 Mozambique becomes independent, border between Mozambique and Rhodesia
  - 1980 Zimbabwe becomes independent

=== Namibia–Zambia ===
  - 1964 Zambia becomes independent, border between Zambia and South Africa
  - 1990 Namibia becomes independent

=== Namibia–South Africa ===
  - 1990 Namibia becomes independent from South Africa

=== Niger–Nigeria ===
  - 1960 Independence for Niger and Nigeria

=== Rwanda–Tanzania ===
  - 2nd Millennium, Establishment of Rwanda, border of Rwanda
  - 1962 Rwanda becomes independent, border between Rwanda and Tanganyika
  - 1964 Establishment of Tanzania after a merger between Tanganyika and Zanzibar

=== Rwanda–Uganda ===
  - 2nd Millennium, Establishment of Rwanda, border of Rwanda
  - 1962 Independence of Rwanda and Uganda

=== South Sudan-Sudan ===
    - 2011 South Sudan splits from Sudan

=== South Sudan–Uganda ===
  - 1956 Sudanese independence from the United Kingdom and Egypt, border between Sudan and the United Kingdom
  - 1962 Uganda becomes independent
  - 2011 South Sudan becomes independent

=== South Africa–Eswatini ===
  - 1830s, Swaziland is moved up north in order to reduce the pressure from the Zulus, border of Swaziland
  - 1931 South Africa becomes independent, border between South Africa and the United Kingdom
  - 1968 Swaziland becomes independent

=== South Africa–Zimbabwe ===
  - 1931 South Africa becomes independent, border between South Africa and the United Kingdom
  - 1980 Zimbabwe becomes independent

=== Tanzania–Uganda ===
  - 1962 Uganda becomes independent, border between Uganda and Tanganyika
  - 1964 Establishment of Tanzania after a merger between Tanganyika and Zanzibar

=== Tanzania–Zambia ===
  - 1964 Establishment of Tanzania after a merger between Tanganyika and Zanzibar and the independence of Zambia

=== Zambia–Zimbabwe ===
  - 1964 Zambia becomes independent, border between Zambia and the United Kingdom
  - 1980 Zimbabwe becomes independent

== North America ==

=== Belize–Guatemala ===
  - 1840 Guatemala becomes independent from Central America, border between Guatemala and the United Kingdom
  - 1981 Belize becomes independent

=== Belize–Mexico ===
  - 1821 Mexico becomes independent from the Spanish Empire, border between Mexico and the United Kingdom
  - 1981 Belize becomes independent

=== Canada–United States ===
- Saint John–Bangor
  - 1783 At the Treaty of Paris ending the American Revolutionary War, border between the United States and Great Britain
- Edmundston–Presque Isle
  - 1842 At the Webster–Ashburton Treaty ending the Aroostook War, border between the United States and the United Kingdom
- From Montréal–Boston to Thunder Bay–Minneapolis
  - 1783 At the Treaty of Paris, border between the United States and Great Britain
- From Winnipeg–Grand Forks to Calgary–Great Falls
  - 1818 At the Treaty of 1818, border between the United States and the United Kingdom
- Vancouver–Seattle
  - 1846 At the Oregon Treaty, border between the United States and the United Kingdom
- Whitehorse–Juneau
  - 1903 At the Hay–Herbert Treaty, border between the United States and the British Empire
- From Whitehorse–Anchorage to Inuvik–Prudhoe Bay
  - 1867 Alaska Purchase, border between the United States and the United Kingdom

=== Canada–Denmark ===
  - 2022 agreement to divide Hans Island

=== Costa Rica–Panama ===
  - 1838 Costa Rica becomes independent, border between Colombia and Costa Rica
  - 1903 Panama becomes independent

=== Costa Rica–Nicaragua ===
  - 1838 Costa Rica and Nicaragua become independent

=== Dominican Republic–Haiti ===
  - 1804 Haiti becomes independent from the French Empire, border between Haiti and France
  - 1821/1844 The Dominican Republic becomes independent from Haiti

=== El Salvador–Guatemala ===
  - 1840 El Salvador and Guatemala become independent

=== El Salvador–Honduras ===
  - 1839 Honduras becomes independent from the Federal Republic of Central America, border between Honduras and the Federal Republic of Central America
  - 1840 El Salvador established after the dissolution of the Federal Republic of Central America

=== France–Netherlands ===
  - 1648 France and the Netherlands divide Saint Martin.

=== Guatemala–Honduras ===
  - 1839 Honduras becomes independent from the Federal Republic of Central America, border between Honduras and the Federal Republic of Central America

=== Guatemala–Mexico ===
  - 1821 Mexico becomes independent, border between Mexico and the Federal Republic of Central America
  - 1840 Guatemala becomes independent

=== Honduras–Nicaragua ===
  - 1838 Nicaragua becomes independent from the Federal Republic of Central America, border between Nicaragua and the Federal Republic of Central America
  - 1839 Honduras becomes independent

=== Mexico–United States ===
- From Matamoros–Corpus Christi to Juárez–El Paso
  - 1848 At the Treaty of Guadalupe Hidalgo ending the Mexican-American War.
- Hermosillo–Phoenix
  - 1853 Gadsden Purchase
- Tijuana–San Diego
  - 1848 At the Treaty of Guadalupe Hidalgo

== South America ==
Continental South America's Border Changes over time

=== Argentina–Brazil ===
- Puerto Iguazú–Foz do Iguaçu
  - 1814 Misiones is claimed by Argentina, border between Argentina and Portugal
- Posadas–Pato Branco
  - 1927 Border between Argentina and Brazil is settled
- Posadas–Porto Alegre
  - 1814 Misiones is claimed by Argentina, border between Argentina and Portugal
- Corrientes–Santa Maria
  - 1820 After the division of the territory of the Liga Federal, border between the United Provinces of South America (Argentina) and Portugal

=== Argentina–Bolivia ===
  - 1825 Bolivian independence from the United Provinces of South America
  - 1925 Final border Treaty

=== Argentina–Chile ===
- Salta–Antofagasta
  - 1884 Chile conquers the Bolivian Antofagasta Region
  - 1899 Border settled
- Mendoza–Santiago de Chile
  - 1810 The United Provinces of South America (Argentina) becomes independent, border between Argentina and Spain
  - 1818 Chile becomes independent with help from Argentina
  - 1856 Treaty of 1856 between Chile and Argentina
- From Comodoro Rivadavia–Coihaique to Ushuaia–Punta Arenas
  - 1881 Boundary Treaty of 1881 between Chile and Argentina
  - 1902 Arbitral award of the Andes of 1902 between Argentina and Chile

=== Argentina–Paraguay ===
  - 1870 Border established after the Paraguayan War

=== Argentina–Uruguay ===
  - 1820 Liga Federal is dissolved and the United Provinces of South America annexes the western provinces, creating today's border
  - 1821 The remainder of Liga Federal is annexed by the United Kingdom of Portugal, Brazil and the Algarves
  - 1825 Uruguay declares independence
  - 1828 Uruguayan independence is recognized

=== Bolivia–Brazil ===
- La Paz–Rio Branco
  - 1903 Treaty of Petropolis, Bolivia cedes Acre to Brazil
- Riberalta–Bom Comérico
  - 1867 Bolivia cells northern Acre to Brazil
- La Paz–Porto Velho
  - 1822 Brazilian independence, border between Brazil and Spain
  - 1825 Bolivian independence
- Santa Cruz–Cuiabá
  - 1867 Bolivia cells parts of eastern Bolivia to Brazil
  - 1927 Final border Treaty

=== Bolivia–Chile ===
- Julaca–Antofagasta
  - 1884 Chile conquers the Bolivian Antofagasta Region
- La Paz–Arica
  - 1825 Bolivian independence, border between Bolivia and Peru
  - 1880 Arica is conquered by Chile

=== Bolivia–Paraguay ===
  - 1938 Chaco War ends with a truce, the current border created
  - 2009 A final Treaty is signed to clearly mark the border

=== Bolivia–Peru ===
- La Paz–Arequipa
  - 1824 Spanish defeated in Peru, border between Peru and Spain
  - 1825 Bolivian independence
- Riberalta–Cuzco
  - 1909 Border settled

=== Brazil–Colombia ===
  - 1907 Treaty of Bogotá, Brazil and Colombia agree on most of the border
  - 1928 The Tratado de Límites y Navegación Fluvial is signed, settling the border

=== Brazil–France ===
  - 1713 The Treaty of Utrecht creates a border between France and Portugal.
  - 1822 Brazil obtains independence

=== Brazil–Guyana ===
- Santarém–Georgetown
  - 1822 Brazilian independence, border between Brazil and the United Kingdom
  - 1966 Guyana becomes independent
- Boa Vista–Georgetown
  - 1904 Italy arbiters in a border dispute, border between Brazil and the British Empire
  - 1966 Guyana becomes independent
- Boa Vista–Imbaimadai
  - 1822 Brazilian independence, border between Brazil and the United Kingdom
  - 1966 Guyana becomes independent

=== Brazil–Paraguay ===
- Campo Grande–Forte Olimpo
  - 1870 Paraguay is defeated in the Paraguayan War and loses territory to Brazil, border between Brazil and the disputed Chaco area, claimed by both Bolivia and Paraguay
  - 1935 After the Chaco War
- Campo Grande–Asunción
  - 1870 Paraguay is defeated in the Paraguayan War and loses territory to Brazil
- Cascavel–Asunción
  - 1811 Paraguay becomes independent, border between Paraguay and Portugal
  - 1822 Brazilian independence

=== Brazil–Peru ===
- Eirunepé–Iquitos
  - 1851 Border agreement
- Rio Branco–Lima
  - 1909 Border agreement

=== Brazil–Suriname ===
  - 1906 Border between Brazil and the Netherlands defined in the Treaty of Limits
  - 1975 Suriname obtains independence

=== Brazil–Uruguay ===
  - 1825 Uruguay declares independence
  - 1828 Uruguay's independence is accepted by Brazil

=== Brazil–Venezuela ===
  - 1777 First Treaty of San Ildefonso is signed designating the border between Spain and Portugal
  - 1819 Gran Colombia becomes independent
  - 1822 Brazilian becomes independent
  - 1830 Venezuela becomes independent

=== Colombia–Ecuador ===
  - 1830 Ecuador becomes independent from Colombia
  - 1916 Final border Treaty

=== Colombia–Panama ===
  - 1903 Panama becomes independent from Colombia

=== Colombia–Peru ===
  - 1922 Border agreement between Colombia and Peru, territory disputed with Ecuador
  - 1942 Ecuador loses a war versus Peru

=== Colombia–Venezuela ===
  - 1830 Venezuela becomes independent from Colombia

=== Ecuador–Peru ===
- Quito–Iquitos
  - 1942 After the Ecuadorian–Peruvian War, disputed
- Cuenca–Sullana
  - 1830 Ecuador becomes independent, disputed

=== France–Suriname ===
  - 17th century, border between France and the Netherlands.
  - 1975 Surinamese independence.

=== Guyana–Suriname ===
- Georgetown–Paramaribo
  - 1966 Guyana becomes independent, border between Guyana and the Netherlands
  - 1975 Suriname becomes independent
- Joli–Majoli
  - 1966 Guyana becomes independent, border between Guyana and the Netherlands
  - 1975 Suriname becomes independent, disputed

=== Guyana–Venezuela ===
  - 1899 Border settled between Venezuela and the British Empire
  - 1966 Guyana becomes independent, border disputed

== Borders of Territories with special status ==
=== Hong Kong–China ===
- Boundary Street
  - 1860 China under the Qing dynasty ceded Kowloon Peninsula to the British crown colony of Hong Kong
- Sham Chun River, Sha Tau Kok River and Pak Kung Au
  - 1898 China under the Qing dynasty leased the New Territories to the United Kingdom until 1997, and was added to the crown colony of Hong Kong
- Dongjiaotou
  - 2007 The Central People's Government of the People's Republic of China leased an area in Dongjiaotou for Hong Kong, one of PRC's special administrative regions, to establish a boundary checkpoint across the Deep Bay / Shenzhen Bay.

=== Algeria–Western Sahara ===
  - 1962 Algeria becomes independent, border between Algeria and Spain
  - 1975 Western Sahara becomes independent and is mostly occupied by Morocco

=== Mauritania–Western Sahara ===
  - 1960 Mauritania becomes independent, border between Mauritania and Spain
  - 1975 Western Sahara becomes independent and is mostly occupied by Morocco

=== Morocco–Western Sahara ===
  - 1884 Berlin Conference, Spain gains Western Sahara and subsequently occupies the territory, border between Morocco and Spain

=== Egypt–Palestinian Territories ===
  - 1841 The United Kingdom forces Egypt to retreat from the Levant, border between Egypt and the Ottoman Empire
  - 2005 Israel evacuates the Gaza Strip

=== Israel–Palestinian Territories ===
- From Nazareth–Jenin to Beersheba–Hebron
  - 1948 Cease fire line in First Arab-Israeli War, border between Israel and Jordan
- Beersheba–Gaza
  - 1948 Cease fire line in the war between Israel and the Arabs, border between Israel and Egypt
  - 2005 Israel evacuates the Gaza Strip

=== Jordan–Palestinian Territories ===
  - 1967 Israel conquers the West Bank, border between Jordan and Israel
