= Cima Sappada =

Alpine pass in Italy

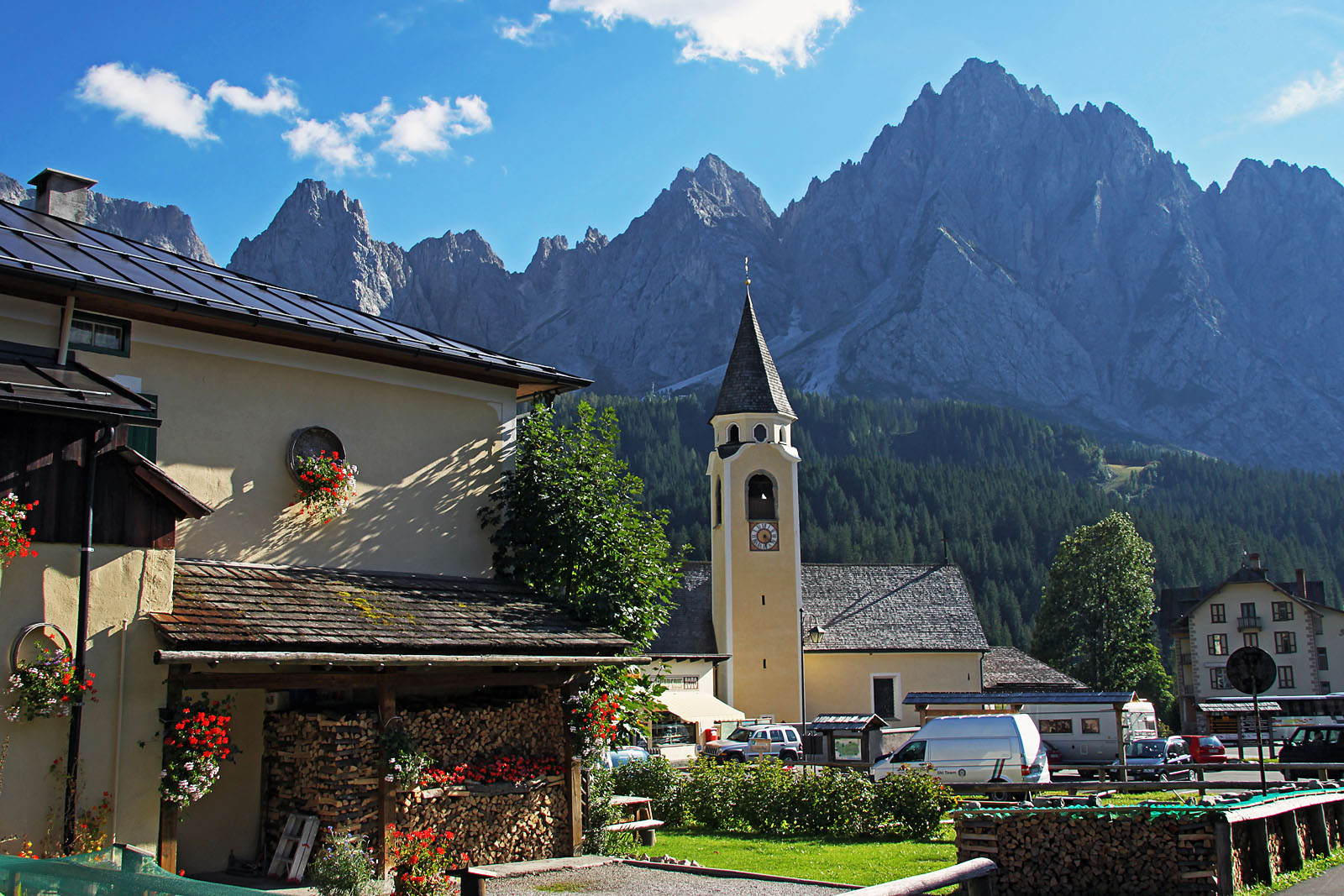
- Interactive map of Cima Sappada

Third Approach
- Location: Italy
- Coordinates: 46°33′59″N 12°43′43″E

Cima Sappada (1292 meters above sea level) is an alpine pass that connects the Degano valley to the Piave valley. To be precise, it connects Forni Avoltri with Sappada.

It is crossed by the 355 national road of Val Degano.

At the top of the pass stands the homonymous village of Cima Sappada, in the municipality of Sappada.

== Cycling ==
During the centenary history of the Giro d'Italia the pass at an altitude of 1292 meters above sea level it was considered three times the King of the Mountains. The first during the 15th stage of the Giro d'Italia 1948 from Udine to Auronzo di Cadore, with the first pass at the top of the Legnano Ligurian Vincenzo Rossello then winner of that stage. The second during the 15th stage of the Giro d'Italia 1987 from Lido di Jesolo to Sappada, with the Dutchman of the Gis Gelati Johan van der Velde the first to cross. On 6 June, during that famous stage, the Irishman Stephen Roche, team-mate at Carrera-Vagabond-Peugeot of the Brescia Roberto Visentini who was in the Pink Jersey, went to the attack and sent in crisis his captain who arrived in Sappada with a gap of 6 minutes 50 seconds, and lost the chance to win that Giro d'Italia. The third time was three years later during the Giro d'Italia 1990 and the first to come down was Bruno Leali with Gianni Bugno the undisputed leader of the Pink jersey from the first to the last stage.
