= Comeglians =

Comeglians Comelians (Friulian)
- Comune
- Comune di Comeglians
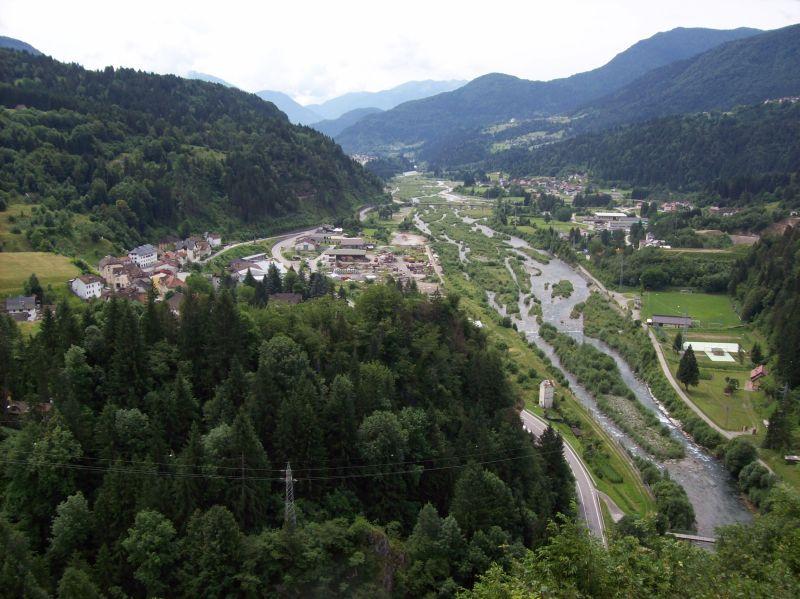
- the town of Comeglians

- Location within Italy Location within Friuli-Venezia Giulia
- Coordinates: 46°31′N 12°53′E
- Country: Italy
- Region: Friuli-Venezia Giulia
- Province: Udine (UD)

Area
  - Total: 19.5 km^{2} (7.5 sq mi)

Population (Dec. 2004)
  - Total: 615
  - Density: 31.5/km^{2} (81.7/sq mi)
- Time zone: UTC+1 (CET)
  - Summer (DST): UTC+2 (CEST)
- Postal code: 33023
- Dialing code: 0433

Comeglians (Friulian: Comelians; Sappada Bavarian: Komerion) is a comune (municipality) in the Regional decentralization entity of Udine in the Italian region of Friuli-Venezia Giulia, located about 120 kilometres (75 mi) northwest of Trieste and about 60 kilometres (37 mi) northwest of Udine. As of 31 December 2004, it had a population of 615 and an area of 19.5 square kilometres (7.5 mi^{2}).

Comeglians borders the following municipalities: Ovaro, Paluzza, Prato Carnico, Ravascletto, Rigolato.

== Demographic evolution ==
Historical population

| Year | Pop. | ±% |
|---|---|---|
| 1861 | ? | — |
| 1871 | 1,529 | — |
| 1881 | 1,607 | +5.1% |
| 1901 | 1,872 | +16.5% |
| 1911 | 1,928 | +3.0% |

| Year | Pop. | ±% |
|---|---|---|
| 1921 | 1,947 | +1.0% |
| 1931 | 1,885 | −3.2% |
| 1936 | 1,666 | −11.6% |
| 1951 | 1,839 | +10.4% |
| 1961 | 1,619 | −12.0% |

| Year | Pop. | ±% |
|---|---|---|
| 1971 | 1,131 | −30.1% |
| 1981 | 918 | −18.8% |
| 1991 | 738 | −19.6% |
| 2001 | 637 | −13.7% |

Source: Data from ISTAT
