= Rigolato =

Rigolato Rigulât (Friulian)
- Comune
- Comune di Rigolato
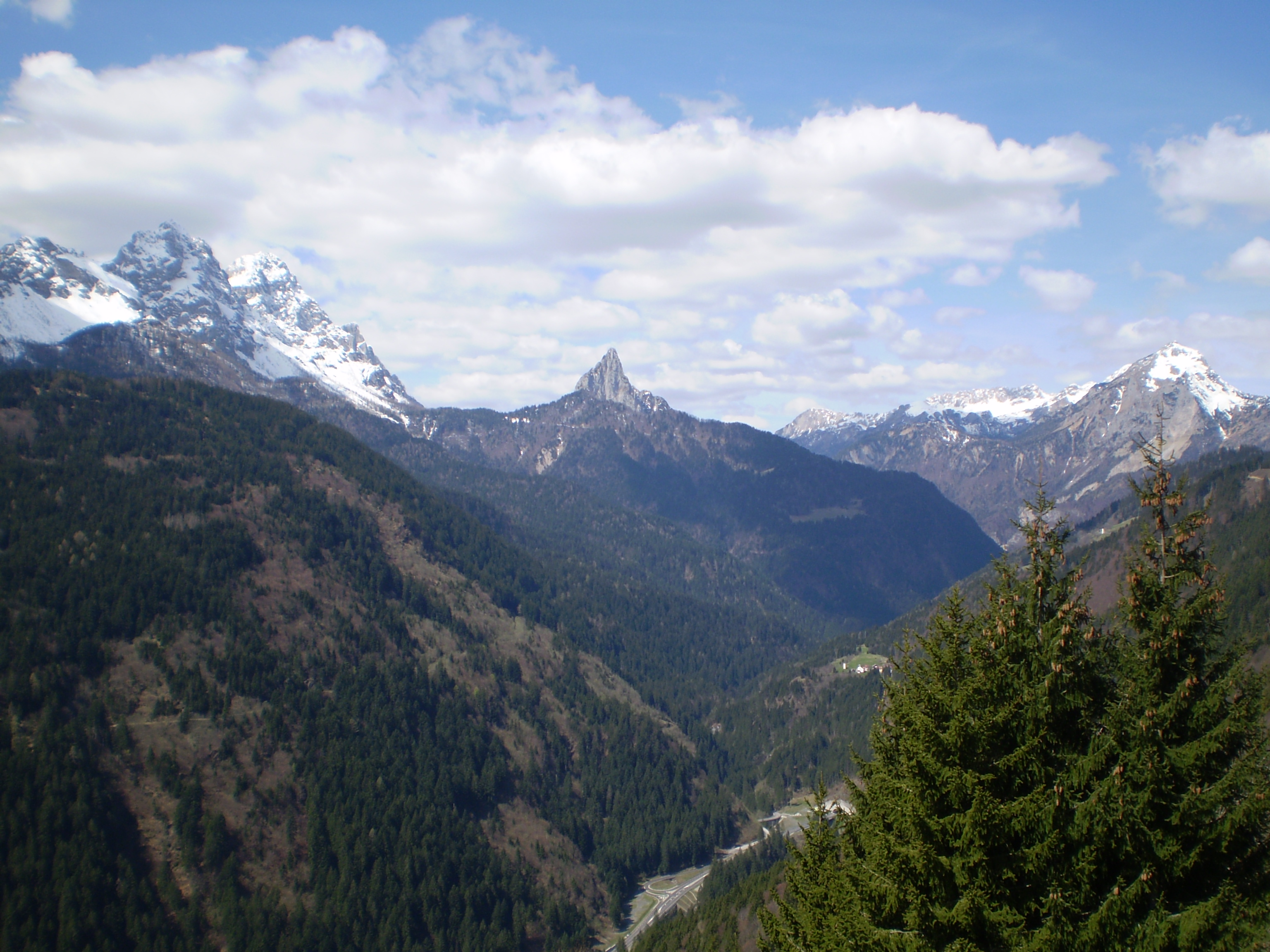
- Degano Valley

- Location within Italy Location within Friuli-Venezia Giulia
- Coordinates: 46°33′N 12°51′E
- Country: Italy
- Region: Friuli-Venezia Giulia
- Province: Udine (UD)

Area
  - Total: 30.5 km^{2} (11.8 sq mi)

Population (Dec. 2004)
  - Total: 601
  - Density: 19.7/km^{2} (51.0/sq mi)
- Time zone: UTC+1 (CET)
  - Summer (DST): UTC+2 (CEST)
- Postal code: 33020
- Dialing code: 0433

Rigolato (Friulian: Rigulât) is a comune (municipality) in the Regional decentralization entity of Udine in the Italian region of Friuli-Venezia Giulia, located about 130 kilometres (81 mi) northwest of Trieste and about 60 kilometres (37 mi) northwest of Udine. As of 31 December 2004, it had a population of 601 and an area of 30.5 square kilometres (11.8 mi^{2}).

Rigolato borders Comeglians, Forni Avoltri, Paluzza, and Prato Carnico.

== Demographic evolution ==
Historical population

Year	Pop.	±%
1861	?	—
1871	1,500	—
1881	1,772	+18.1%
1901	2,271	+28.2%
1911	2,397	+5.5%

Year	Pop.	±%
1921	2,443	+1.9%
1931	2,135	−12.6%
1936	1,931	−9.6%
1951	2,058	+6.6%
1961	1,910	−7.2%

Year	Pop.	±%
1971	1,272	−33.4%
1981	976	−23.3%
1991	765	−21.6%
2001	641	−16.2%

Source: Data from ISTAT

== Twin towns ==
Rigolato is twinned with:

- Bethoncourt, France
