= Burkina Faso–Togo border =

International border

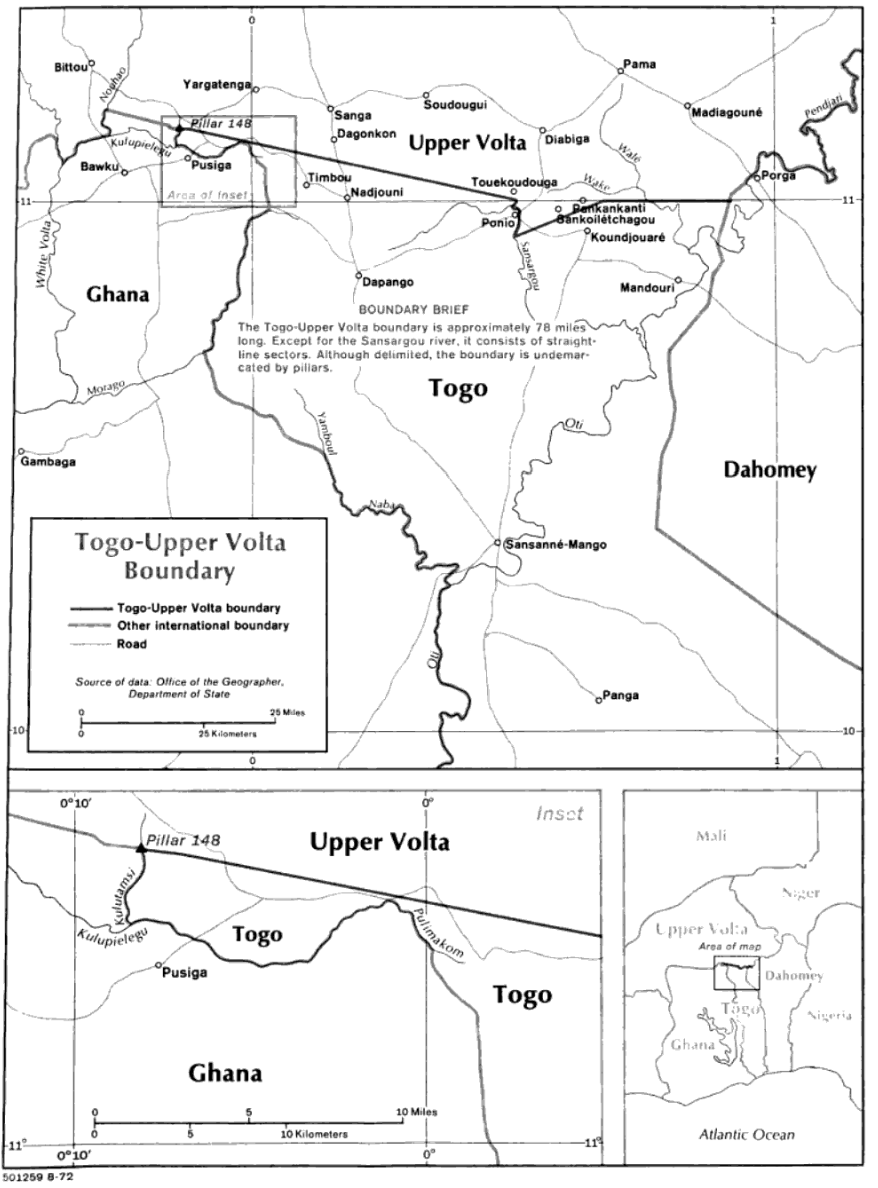
Map of the Burkina Faso-Togo border

The Burkina Faso–Togo border is 131 km (81 mi) in length and runs from the tripoint with Ghana in the west to the tripoint with Benin in the east.

== Description ==
The border starts in the west at the tripoint with Ghana, and continues in a straight line orientated to the south-east. A short section then runs southwards along the Sansargou river, before a straight line veers to the north-east up to the 11th parallel north; the border then runs in a straight line immediately north of this parallel eastwards, terminating at the Beninese tripoint.

== History ==
The 1880s saw an intense competition for territory in Africa by the European powers, a process known as the 'Scramble for Africa'. Germany began taking an interest in acquiring African colonies in this period, signing treaties with chiefs along the coast of modern Togo in July 1884. The colony of German Togoland was then extended gradually inland. As a result of the Scramble, France had gained control the upper valley of the Niger River (roughly equivalent to the areas of modern Mali and Niger). France occupied this area in 1900; Mali (then referred to as French Sudan) was originally included, along with modern Niger and Burkina Faso (then called Upper Volta), within the Upper Senegal and Niger colony and became a constituent of the federal colony of French West Africa (Afrique occidentale française, abbreviated AOF).

France and Germany agreed upon the boundary between German Togoland and French territory on 23 July 1897. This was then delimited in more detail on 28 September 1912. In the First World War German Togoland was conquered by the Allied powers and then split into British and French mandates along a dividing line agreed upon on 10 July 1919. As a result, what is now the Burkina Faso-Ghana-Togo tripoint was shifted eastwards.

As the movement for decolonisation grew in the post-Second World War era, France gradually granted more political rights and representation for their sub-Saharan African colonies, culminating in the granting of broad internal autonomy to French West Africa in 1958 within the framework of the French Community. Eventually, in 1960, both French Togoland and Upper Volta gained independence (British Togoland having been absorbed into Ghana), and their mutual frontier became an international one between two states.

== Settlements near the border ==
=== Burkina Faso ===
- Pouniouassankoto
- Dagonkon
- Touekoudouga

=== Togo ===
- Timbou
- Nadjouni
- Koundjouare
- Ponio
- Senkase

== Border crossings ==
The main crossing is located at Senkanse-Bitou. Third party governments generally discourage travel to the border region due to the poor security situation in Burkina Faso.
