= Bordaglia Lake =

Lake in Italy

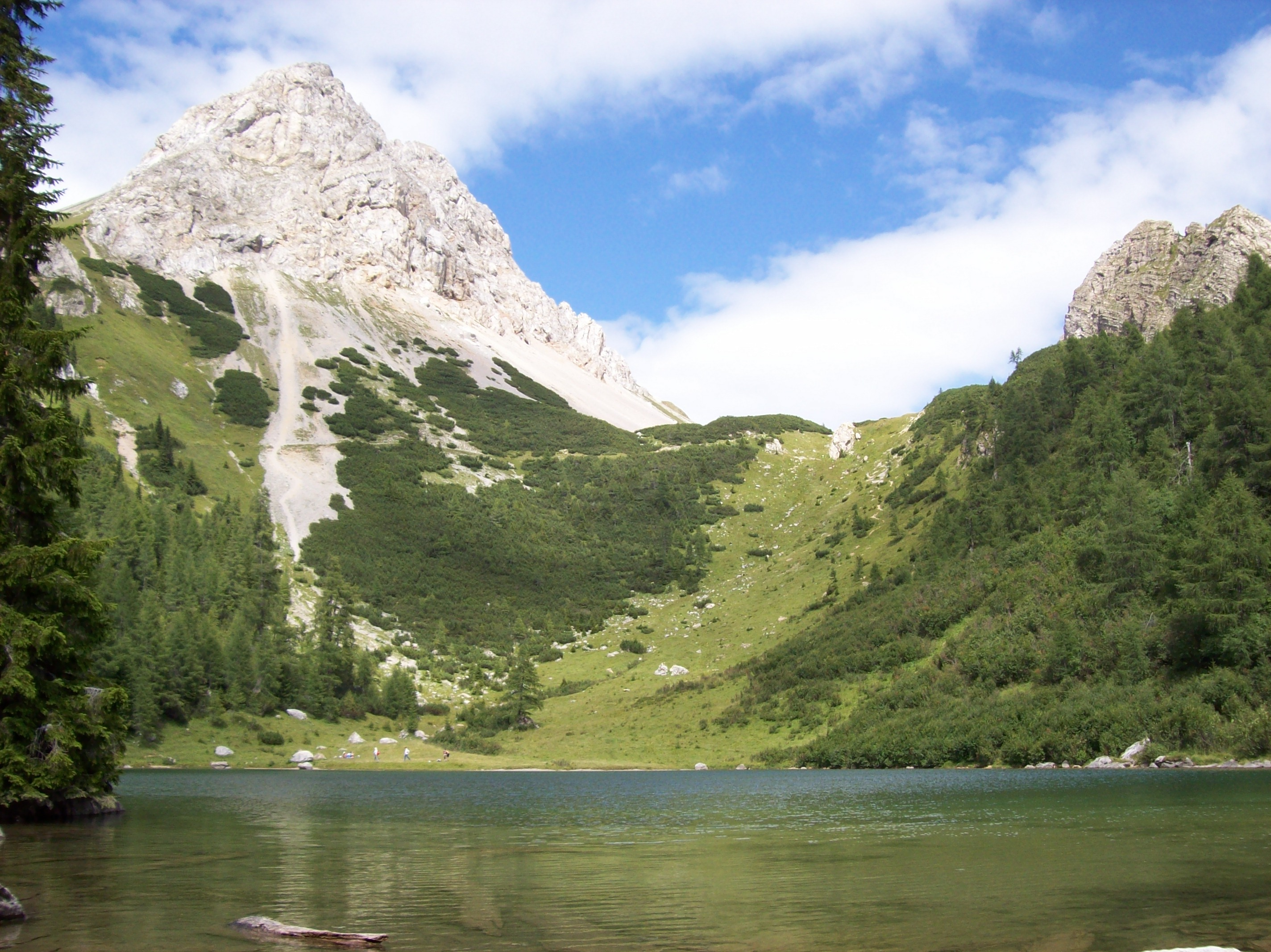

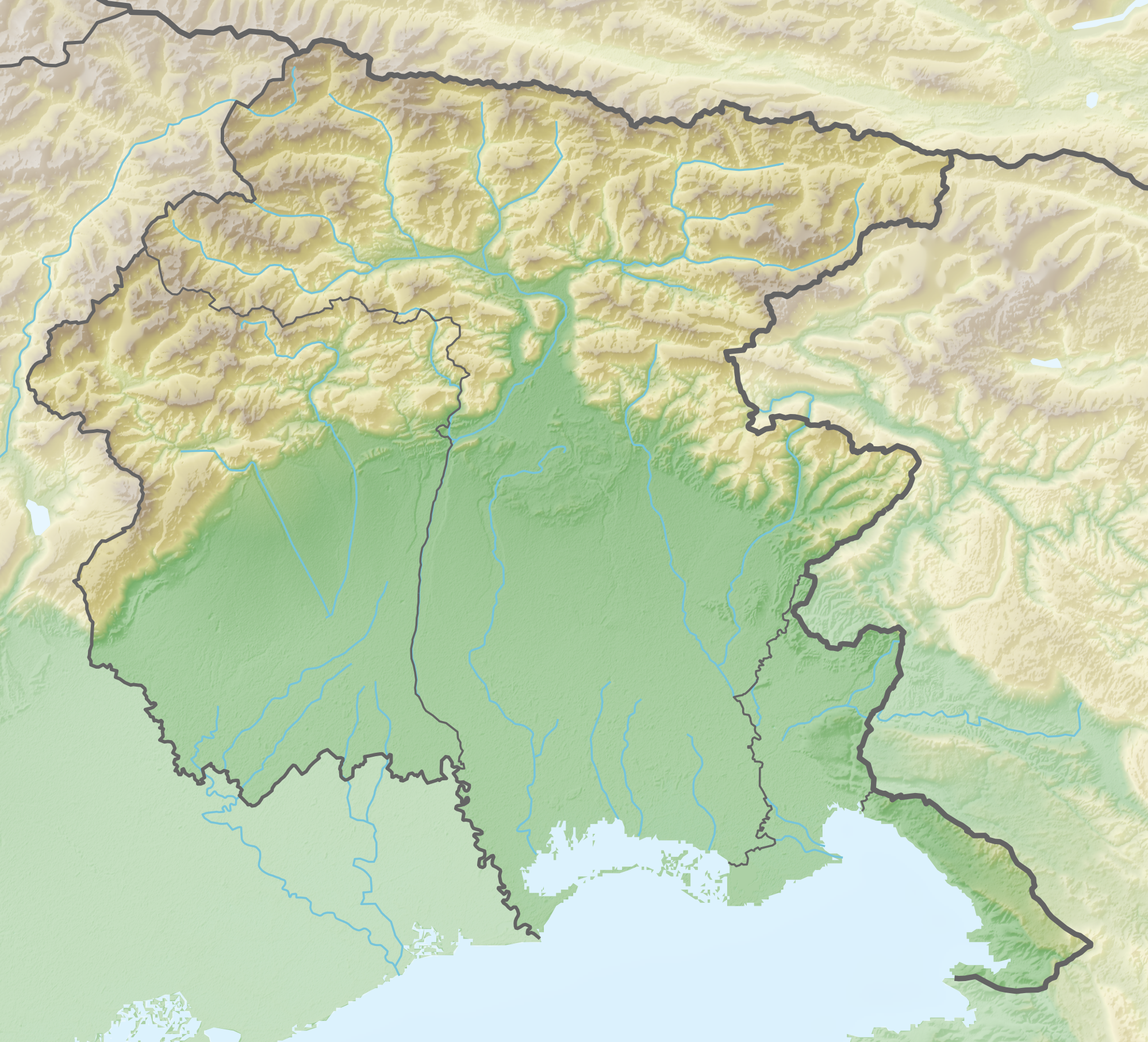
- Location within Friuli-Venezia Giulia
- Location: Forni Avoltri, Province of Udine, Friuli-Venezia Giulia
- Coordinates: 46.623417°N 12.814479°E
- Basin countries: Italy

Bordaglia Lake (Italian: Lago di Bordaglia) is a lake at Forni Avoltri, Province of Udine, Friuli-Venezia Giulia, Italy.

== Geography ==
The lake is of glacial origin.

== Flora and fauna ==
Life found at the lake includes ostracods and potamogeton alpinus.
