= Prato Carnico =

Prato Carnico Prât (Friulian)
- Comune
- Comune di Prato Carnico
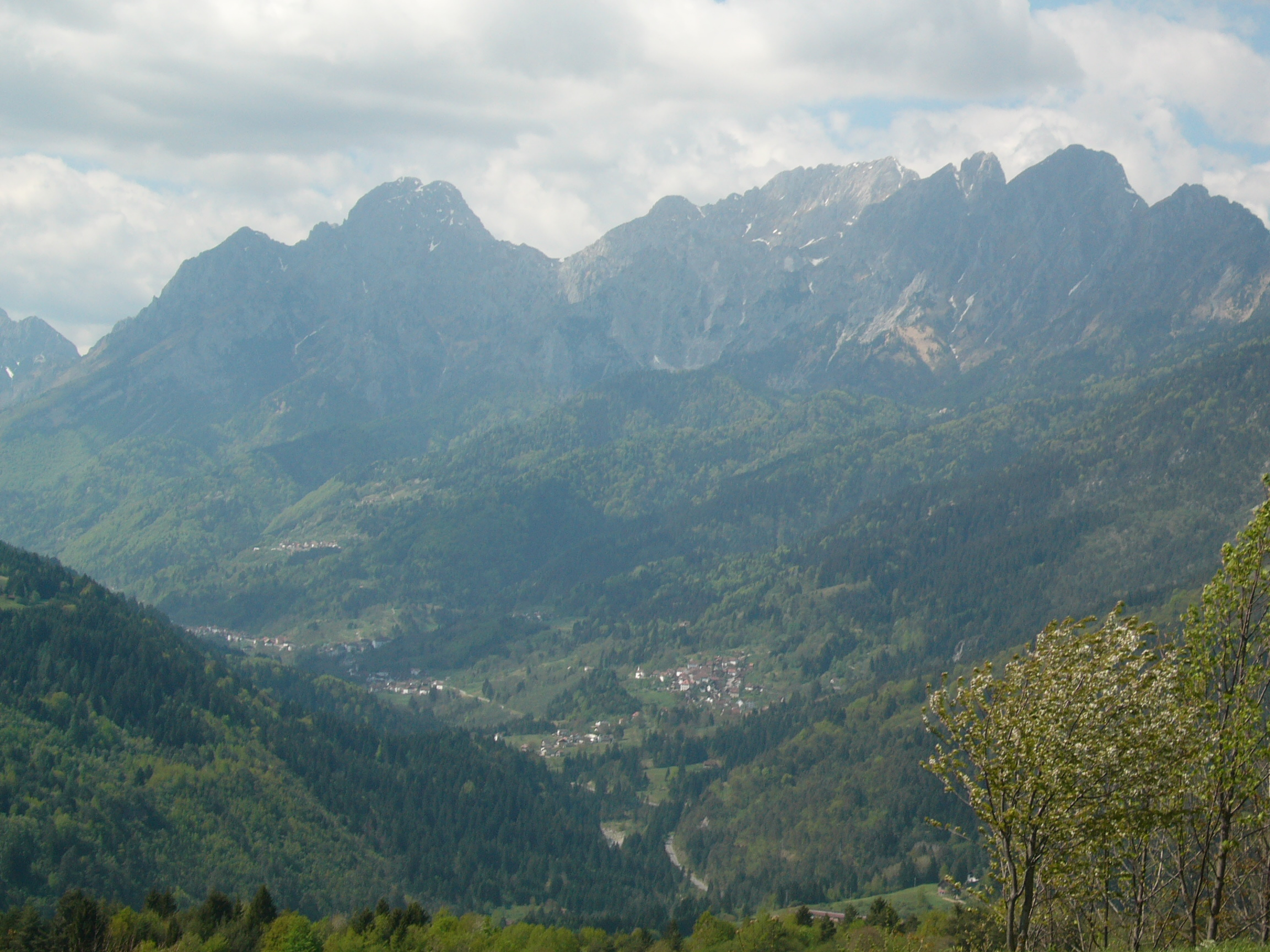

- Location within Italy Location within Friuli-Venezia Giulia
- Coordinates: 46°31′N 12°49′E
- Country: Italy
- Region: Friuli-Venezia Giulia
- Province: Udine (UD)

Area
  - Total: 81.3 km^{2} (31.4 sq mi)
- Elevation: 686 m (2,251 ft)

Population (2010)
  - Total: 958
  - Density: 11.8/km^{2} (30.5/sq mi)
- Time zone: UTC+1 (CET)
  - Summer (DST): UTC+2 (CEST)
- Postal code: 33020
- Dialing code: 0433
- Website: www.comune.prato-carnico.ud.it

Prato Carnico (Friulian: Prât di Cjargne, locally Prât) is a comune (municipality) in the Regional decentralization entity of Udine in the Italian region of Friuli-Venezia Giulia, located about 120 kilometres (75 mi) northwest of Trieste and about 60 kilometres (37 mi) northwest of Udine. As of 9 October 2011, it had a population of 927 and an area of 81.3 square kilometres (31.4 mi^{2}).

Prato Carnico borders the following municipalities: Comeglians, Forni Avoltri, Ovaro, Rigolato, Sappada, Sauris, Vigo di Cadore.

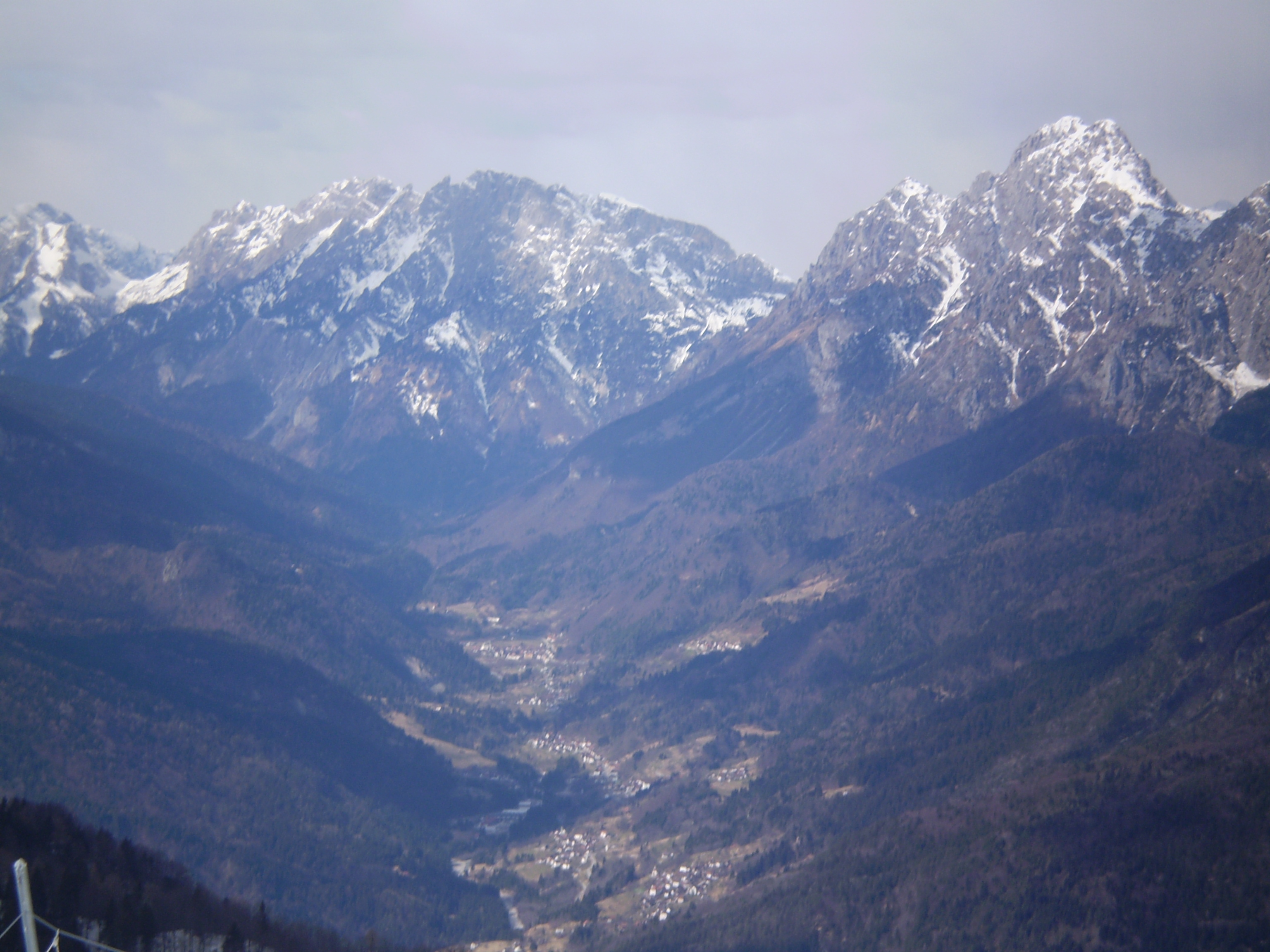
the town is situated in the Paserina Valley

== Demographic evolution ==
Historical population

Year	Pop.	±%
1861	?	—
1871	2,416	—
1881	2,657	+10.0%
1901	3,090	+16.3%
1911	3,244	+5.0%

Year	Pop.	±%
1921	3,329	+2.6%
1931	2,688	−19.3%
1936	2,403	−10.6%
1951	2,538	+5.6%
1961	2,218	−12.6%

Year	Pop.	±%
1971	1,723	−22.3%
1981	1,447	−16.0%
1991	1,218	−15.8%
2001	1,065	−12.6%

Source: Data from ISTAT
