= Paluzza =

Paluzza Paluce (Friulian)
- Comune
- Comune di Paluzza
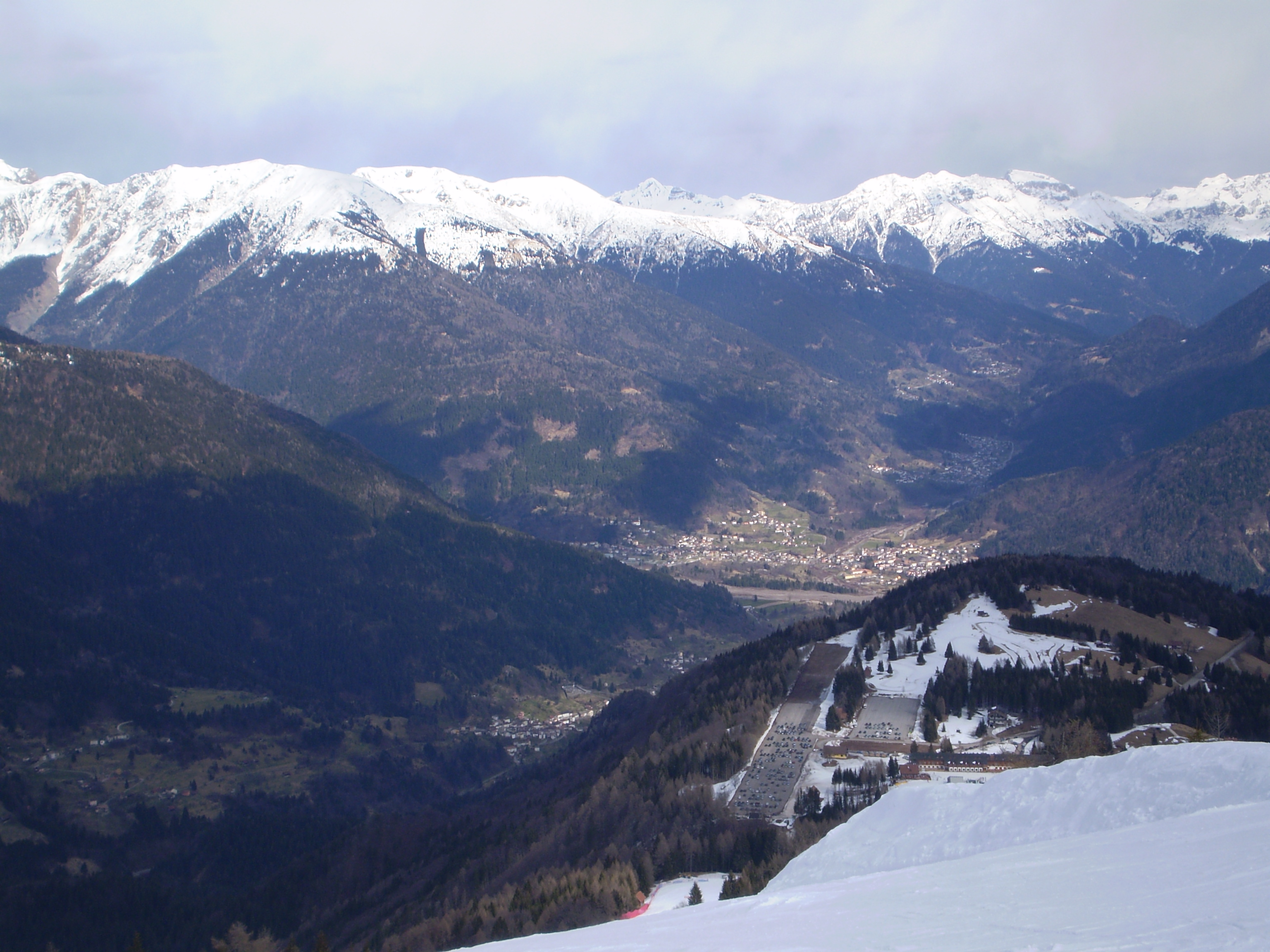
- View from Monte Zoncolan

- Coat of arms

- Location within Italy Location within Friuli-Venezia Giulia
- Coordinates: 46°32′N 13°1′E
- Country: Italy
- Region: Friuli-Venezia Giulia
- Province: Udine (UD)
- Frazioni: Casteons, Cleulis, Naunina, Rivo, Timau

Government
  - Mayor: Massimo Mentil

Area
  - Total: 69.75 km^{2} (26.93 sq mi)

Population (31 December 2017)
  - Total: 2,158
  - Density: 30.94/km^{2} (80.13/sq mi)
- Demonym: Paluzzani
- Time zone: UTC+1 (CET)
  - Summer (DST): UTC+2 (CEST)
- Postal code: 33026
- Dialing code: 0433
- Website: Official website

Paluzza (Friulian: Paluce, German: Timau) is a comune (municipality) in the Regional decentralization entity of Udine in the Italian region of Friuli-Venezia Giulia.

== Geography ==
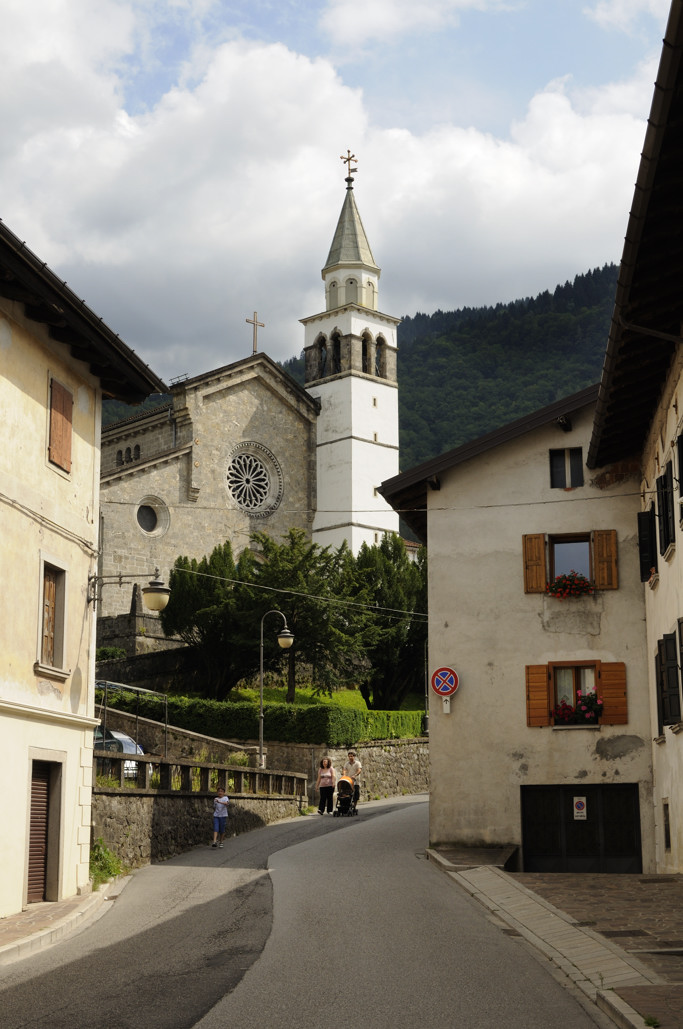
The Church of Santa Maria

It is located about 120 kilometres (75 mi) northwest of Trieste and about 50 kilometres (31 mi) northwest of Udine, in the historic Carnia region of Friuli, close to the border with Austria at Plöcken Pass (Italian: Passo di Monte Croce Carnico).

Paluzza borders the following municipalities: Arta Terme, Cercivento, Comeglians, Forni Avoltri, Kötschach-Mauthen (Austria), Lesachtal (Austria), Paularo, Ravascletto, Rigolato, Sutrio, Treppo Ligosullo.

The municipal area comprises the frazioni of Casteons, Cleulis, Englaro, Naunina, Rivo, and Timau (German: Tischelwang), where a particular variant of the Southern Bavarian dialect is spoken. A local term in the Bavarian language for "hello" is pfiati.

Sights include the Torre Moscarda, a surviving structure of a castle (Castrum Moscardum) built here by the Patriarch of Aquileia Gregorio di Montelongo; nearby are remains of ancient Roman and World War I fortifications.
