= Senkase =

- Location within Togo
- Coordinates: 11°5′26″N 0°3′8″E
- Country: Togo

Senkase is a settlement in the Savanes Region of northern Togo. It is a few kilometres away from the Togo – Burkina Faso – Ghana tripoint and the village is a border checkpoint between Togo and Burkina Faso and between Togo and Ghana.
