= Forni Avoltri =

Forni Avoltri For Davuatri
- Comune
- Comune di Forni Avoltri
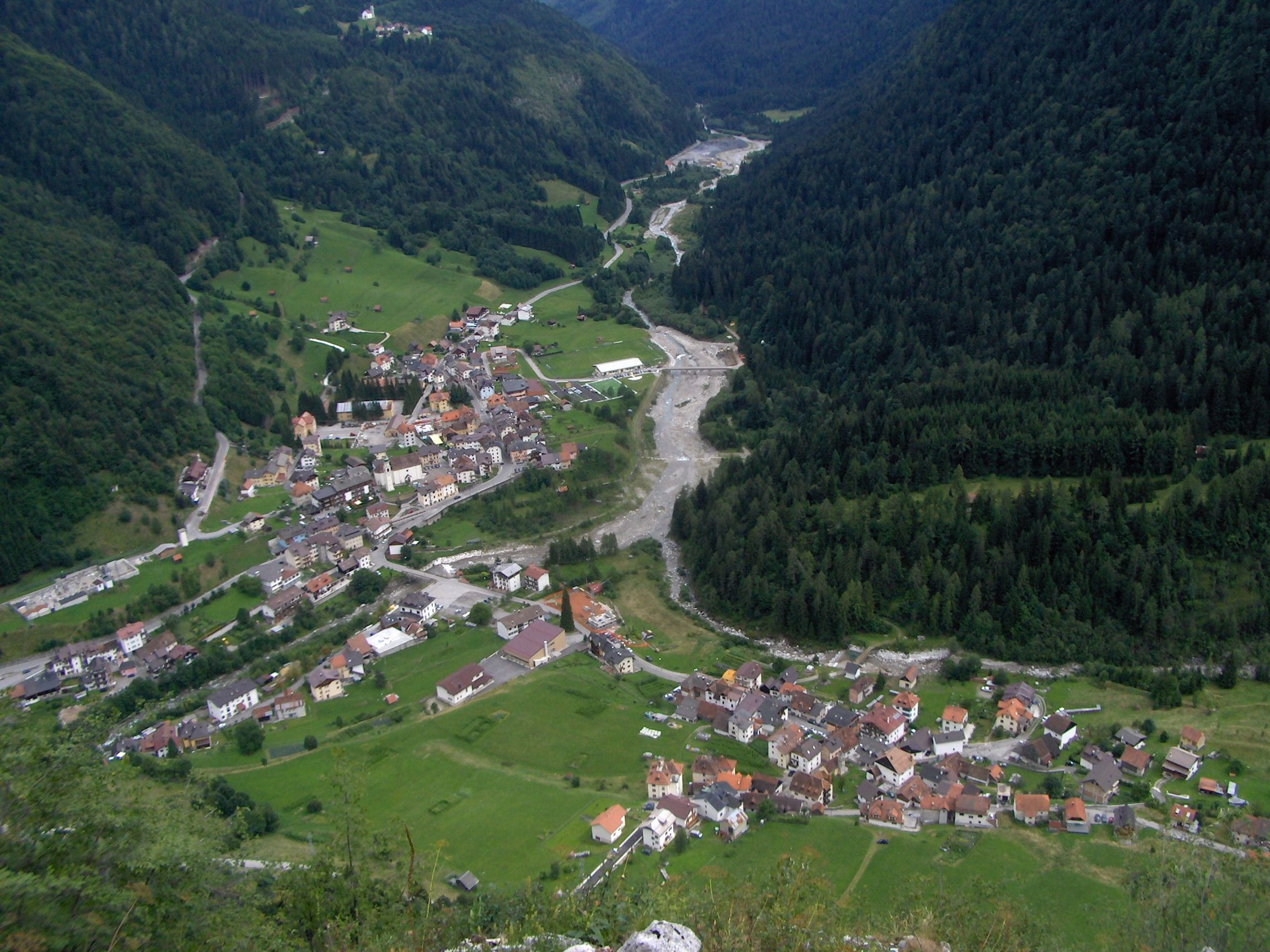

- Location within Italy Location within Friuli-Venezia Giulia
- Coordinates: 46°35′N 12°47′E
- Country: Italy
- Region: Friuli-Venezia Giulia
- Province: Province of Udine (UD)
- Frazioni: Piani di Luzza, Frassenetto, Sigilletto, Collinetta, Collina

Government
  - Mayor: Clara Vidale (civic list)

Area
  - Total: 80.7 km^{2} (31.2 sq mi)
- Elevation: 888 m (2,913 ft)

Population (aug. 2010)
  - Total: 657
  - Density: 8.14/km^{2} (21.1/sq mi)
- Demonym(s): fornetti and avoltrini
- Time zone: UTC+1 (CET)
  - Summer (DST): UTC+2 (CEST)
- Postal code: 33020
- Dialing code: 0433
- Patron saint: Saint Lawrence
- Saint day: August 10
- Website: Official website

Forni Avoltri (Friulian: For Davôtri, in the local Carnian dialect For Davuatri) is a comune (municipality) in the Regional decentralization entity of Udine in the Italian region of Friuli-Venezia Giulia, located about 130 kilometres (81 mi) northwest of Trieste and about 70 kilometres (43 mi) northwest of Udine, on the border with Austria. As of 31 December 2004, it had a population of 704 and an area of 80.8 square kilometres (31.2 mi^{2}).

The municipality of Forni Avoltri contains the frazioni (boroughs) of Piani di Luzza, Frassenetto, Sigilletto, Collinetta, and Collina.

Forni Avoltri borders the following municipalities: Lesachtal (Austria), Paluzza, Prato Carnico, Rigolato, Santo Stefano di Cadore, Sappada.

== History ==
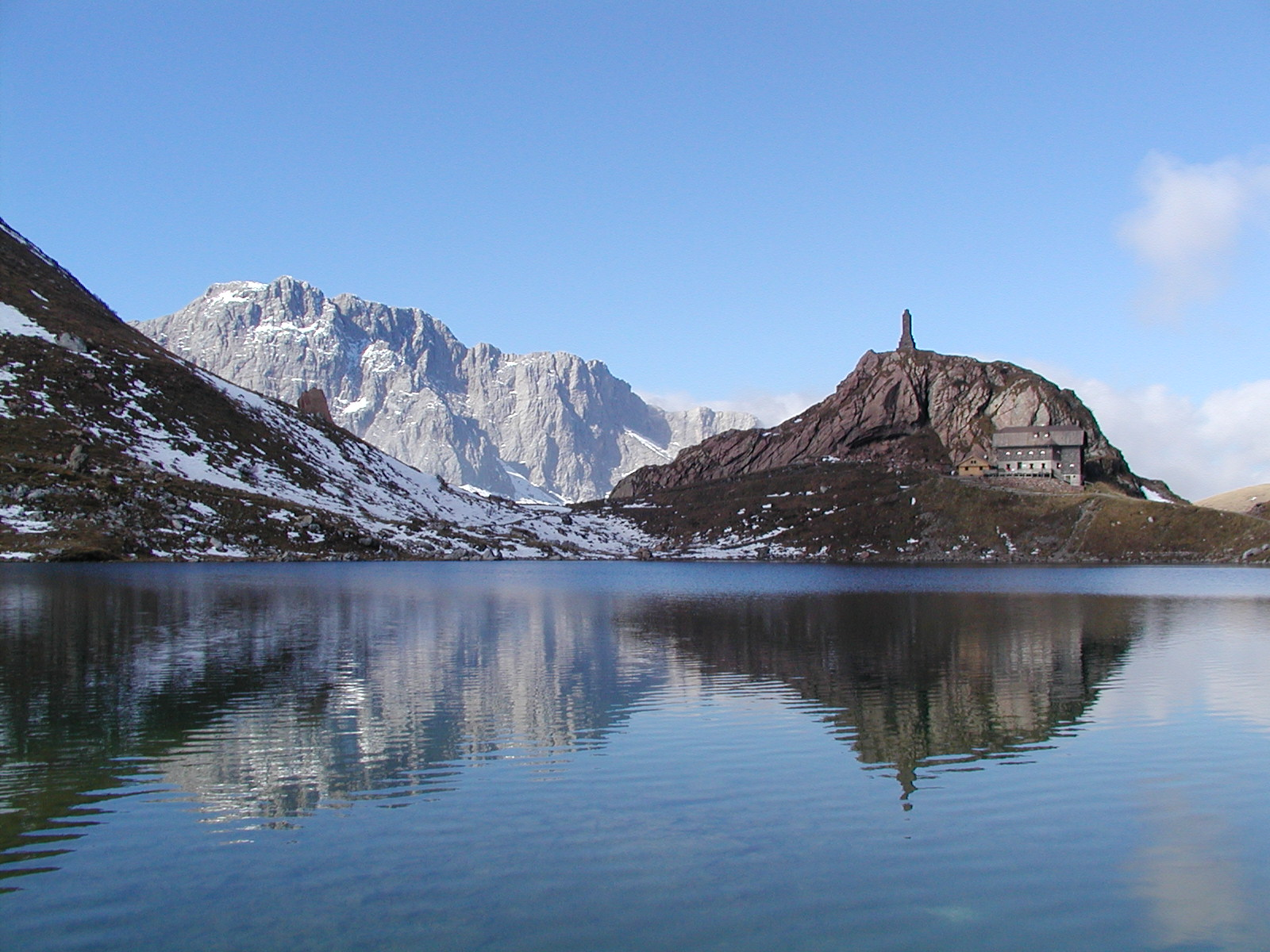
Lake Volaia

Forni and Avoltri are two villages very closely together linked to the mines in the same area where minerals are extracted and melted from Mount Avanza. Avoltri (from ab ultra, i.e. beyond the water of the Degano stream) would constitute the first residential village for the people who work at the mines. The first evidence of any mining activity dates back to a document of 1328, a concession of the Patriarch of Aquileia Pagano della Torre in Nascimbene known as Guercio di Scarfedara which asked to reactivate the mines and an oven in Avoltri which appeared to have been active in the past. These mines were referenced to be abundant in plenty of minerals including iron and copper. There is a mention, however, Avoltri in documents dating back to 1275 concerning women's right to income in the fraction of Collina, which would be the earliest proof of any livelihood in the area.

Forni Avoltri followed the historical events of Friuli. From the domination of the Patriarchate of Aquileia to the passage in 1420 to the Serenissima, which used the Forni woods to obtain timber to be used in the construction of houses and ships.

In 1508 bands of lansquenets descend from Passo Volaia, they sack and set fire to two out of the four fractions of Forni Avoltri: Collina and Collinetta. After the brief parenthesis of the French presence, with the fall of Napoleon in 1815, Forni Avoltri also became part of the Lombard-Veneto Kingdom under Austrian rule, until 1866, the year of its annexation to the Kingdom of Italy after the third independence war. Being a borderland, the area was often at the center of the clashes that took place in various war events.

During World War I the town was evacuated and used at first as a base for the supply of the Italian troops on the front line, it was the seat of the local command and the field hospital. The town was subjected to several bombings with grenades by the Austrians and was occupied following the Caporetto route, from November 1917 to November 1918.

Towards the end of World War II Forni Avoltri was the battleground zone with the retreating German army, between 1944 and 1945 it suffered the bombing of the towns of Frassenetto and Forni. Between October 1944 and April 1945 the Cossack troops on horseback settle there. In November 1966 the town suffered a disastrous flood, in which the then mayor Riccardo Romanin, Augusto Brunasso, Ezio Brunasso and Emilio Romanin, engaged in rescue operations, and three nineteen year olds Beppino Del Fabbro, Gildo Romanin and Raffaele Vidale lost their lives. Thanks to the appeal launched by the daily Messaggero Veneto and collected by the newspaper La Provincia di Como, a subscription was immediately opened in favor of the affected populations. In 1967 it was thus possible to inaugurate the new middle school, a gift from the people of Como, named after the late mayor Riccardo Romanin and the other victims.

== Demographic evolution ==
Historical population

Year	Pop.	±%
1861	?	—
1871	1,086	—
1881	1,180	+8.7%
1901	1,387	+17.5%
1911	1,446	+4.3%

Year	Pop.	±%
1921	1,603	+10.9%
1931	1,477	−7.9%
1936	1,454	−1.6%
1951	1,508	+3.7%
1961	1,449	−3.9%

Year	Pop.	±%
1971	1,197	−17.4%
1981	982	−18.0%
1991	817	−16.8%
2001	735	−10.0%

Source: Data from ISTAT

== Geography ==
The municipality consists of six inhabited areas, the two main villages from which the municipality takes its name and the 4 hamlets:

- Forni ("For" in Friulian, loc. Lu For), 293 inhab., Municipal capital and site of the town hall and the weather station
- Avoltri (Davôtri in Friulian, loc. Davùatri) 176 inhab., Alt. 907 m a.s.l.

=== Fractions ===
Along the road that leads from the center of Forni to the Tolazzi refuge, you will find the following hamlets:

- Frassenetto
- Sigilletto
- Collinetta - Today we tend to consider it part of the largest hamlet of Collina. (Rectius: the Collinotti - as the inhabitants are called - have always considered Collina and Collinetta as one whole community), but two divided countries (even if only by a few meters).
- Collina

=== Localities ===
- Cjolos - Just above the town of Avoltri, towards the west, along the road that leads from the municipal capital to Sappada.
- Piani di Luzza - Center of summer camps and winter sports, always towards the west, along the road to Sappada. It houses the international biathlon stadium, the second in Italy.
- Pierabech - Heading north towards the border with Austria, hosts an area of 2,300 hectares, the wildlife oasis of Bordaglia-Flèons, from here you can also access the marble quarry and the ancient mines of Mount Avanza; there are some trenches and military fortifications dating back to the First World War. There is also the factory site for the bottling of mineral water from the Flèons spring and it's the location for various summer camps.

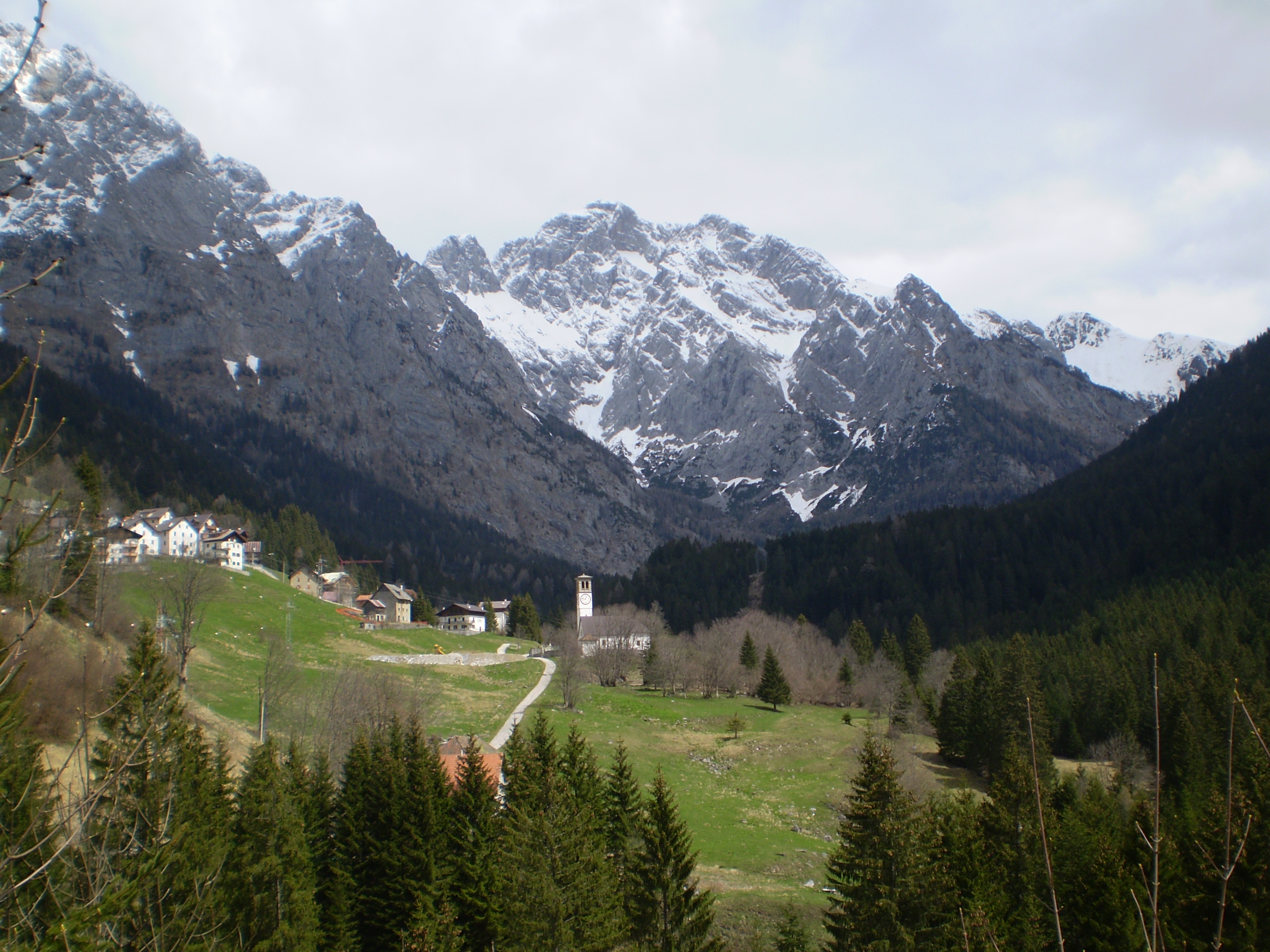
Collina di Forni Avoltri, Carnia, Friuli

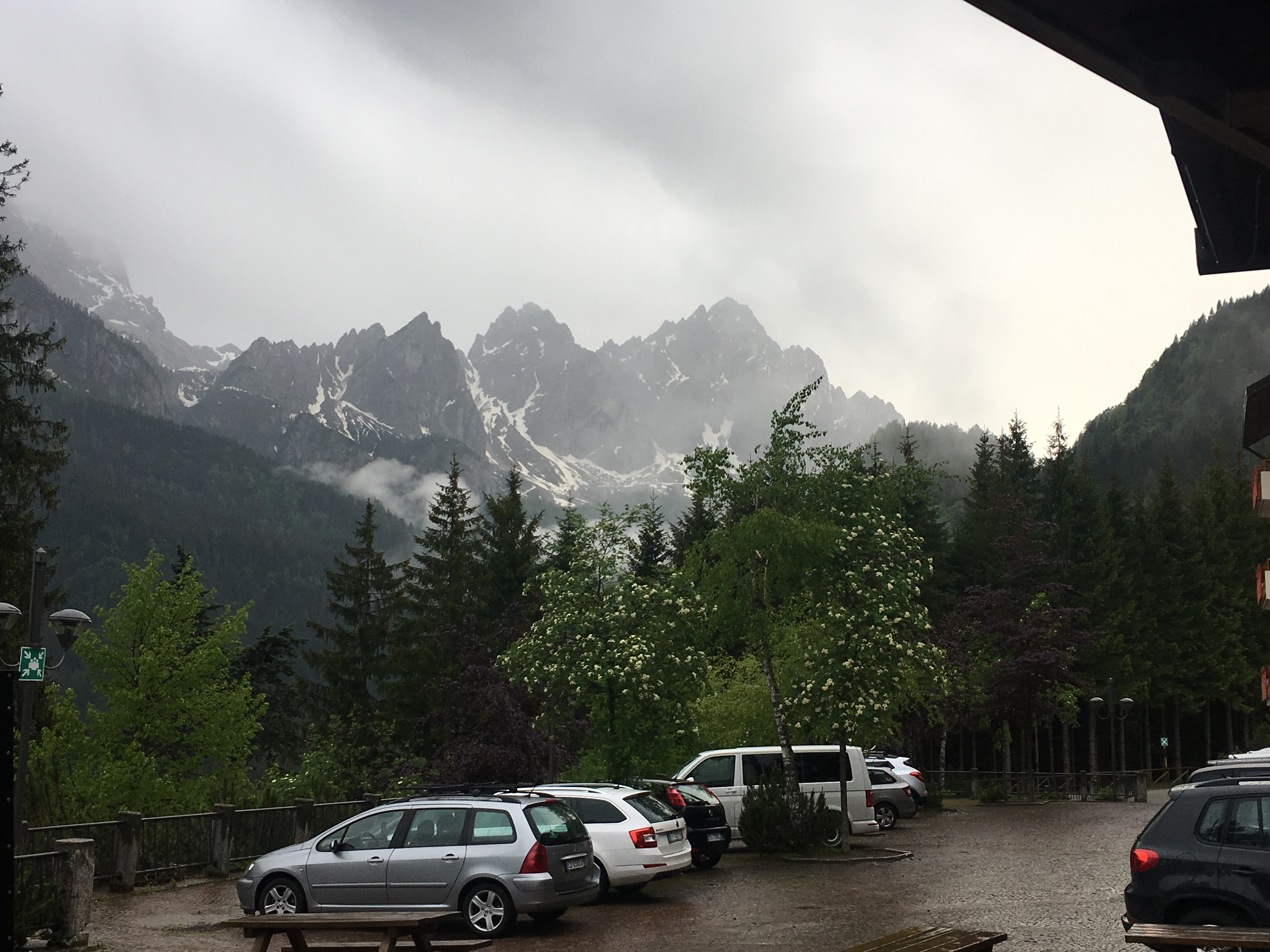
Forni Avoltri, View from la Via Piani Di Luzza

== Bibliography ==
- Tullio Ceconi, Forni Avoltri, 1800-1915, Avvenimenti, risorse locali e mobilità delle persone, Collana ricerche storiche del Comune di Forni Avoltri, 2011
- AA.VV., Dai boschi della Carnia alle foreste del Canada, Collana ricerche storiche del Comune di Forni Avoltri, 2010
- Ceconi Tullio, Tracce di storia per immagini, Circoli Culturali della Carnia, 1996
- Pellicciari T.,Forni Avoltri, Arti Grafiche Friulane, Udine, 1973
