= Lutter, Haut-Rhin =

Commune in Grand Est, France

Lutter
- Commune
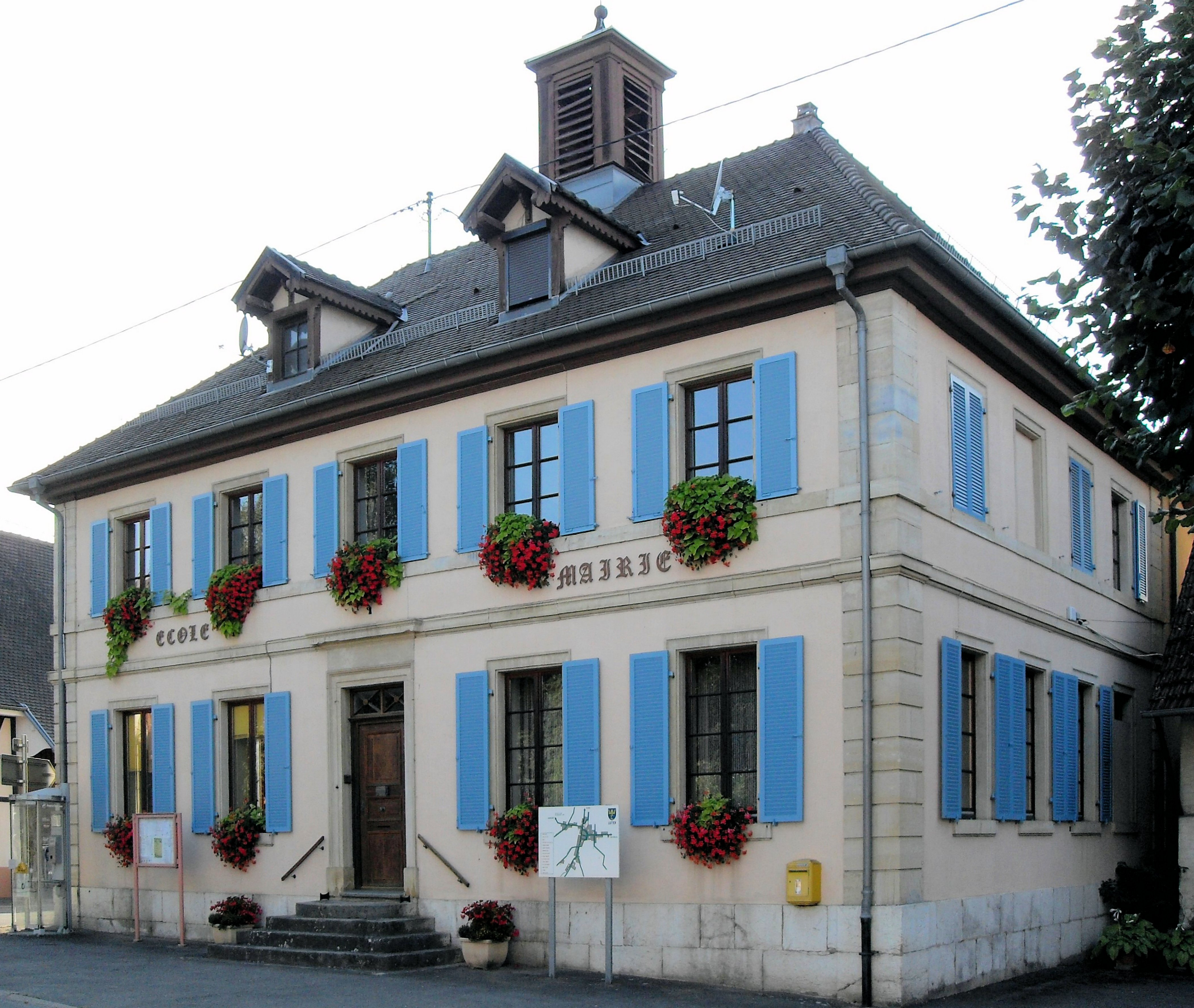
- The town hall and school in Lutter

- Coat of arms
- Location of Lutter
- Location within France Location within Grand Est
- Coordinates: 47°28′01″N 7°22′54″E
- Country: France
- Region: Grand Est
- Department: Haut-Rhin
- Arrondissement: Altkirch
- Canton: Altkirch

Government
  - Mayor (2020–2026): Thierry Doll
- Area^{1}: 8.46 km^{2} (3.27 sq mi)
- Elevation: 440 m (1,440 ft)
- Highest elevation: 780 m (2,560 ft)
- Lowest elevation: 418 m (1,371 ft)
- Population (2023): 291
  - Density: 34.4/km^{2} (89.1/sq mi)
- Time zone: UTC+01:00 (CET)
  - Summer (DST): UTC+02:00 (CEST)
- INSEE/Postal code: 68194 /68480
- ^{1} French Land Register data, which excludes lakes, ponds, glaciers > 1 km^{2} (0.386 sq mi or 247 acres) and river estuaries.

Lutter is a commune in the Haut-Rhin department in Alsace in north-eastern France.

== See also ==
- Communes of the Haut-Rhin département
