= Gartog =

Village in Tibet, China

Coordinates: 29°41′N 98°33′E

Gartog is a village in the Tibet Autonomous Region of China.

== See also ==
- List of towns and villages in Tibet
