= Château de Heidwiller =

Castle in Haut-Rhin, Alsace, France

Coordinates: 47.6587°N 7.2395°E

Château de Heidwiller is a castle in the commune of Heidwiller, in the department of Haut-Rhin, Alsace, France. It is a listed historical monument since 1996.

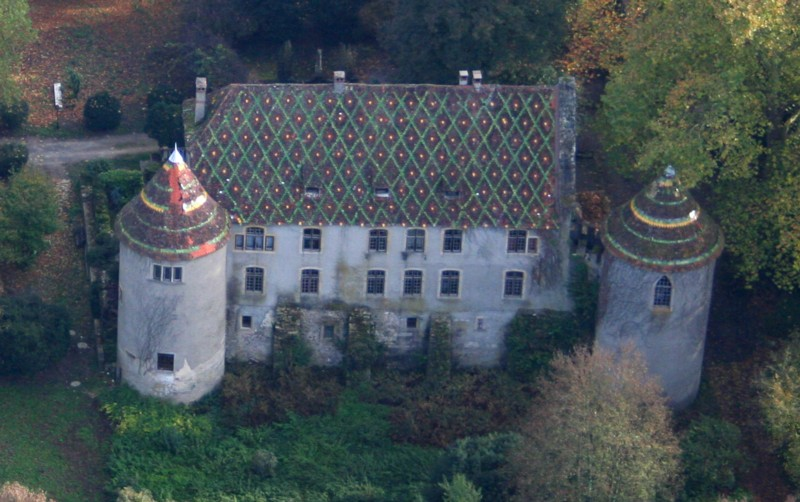
Château de Heidwiller
