= Sondersdorf =

Commune in Grand Est, France

- Commune
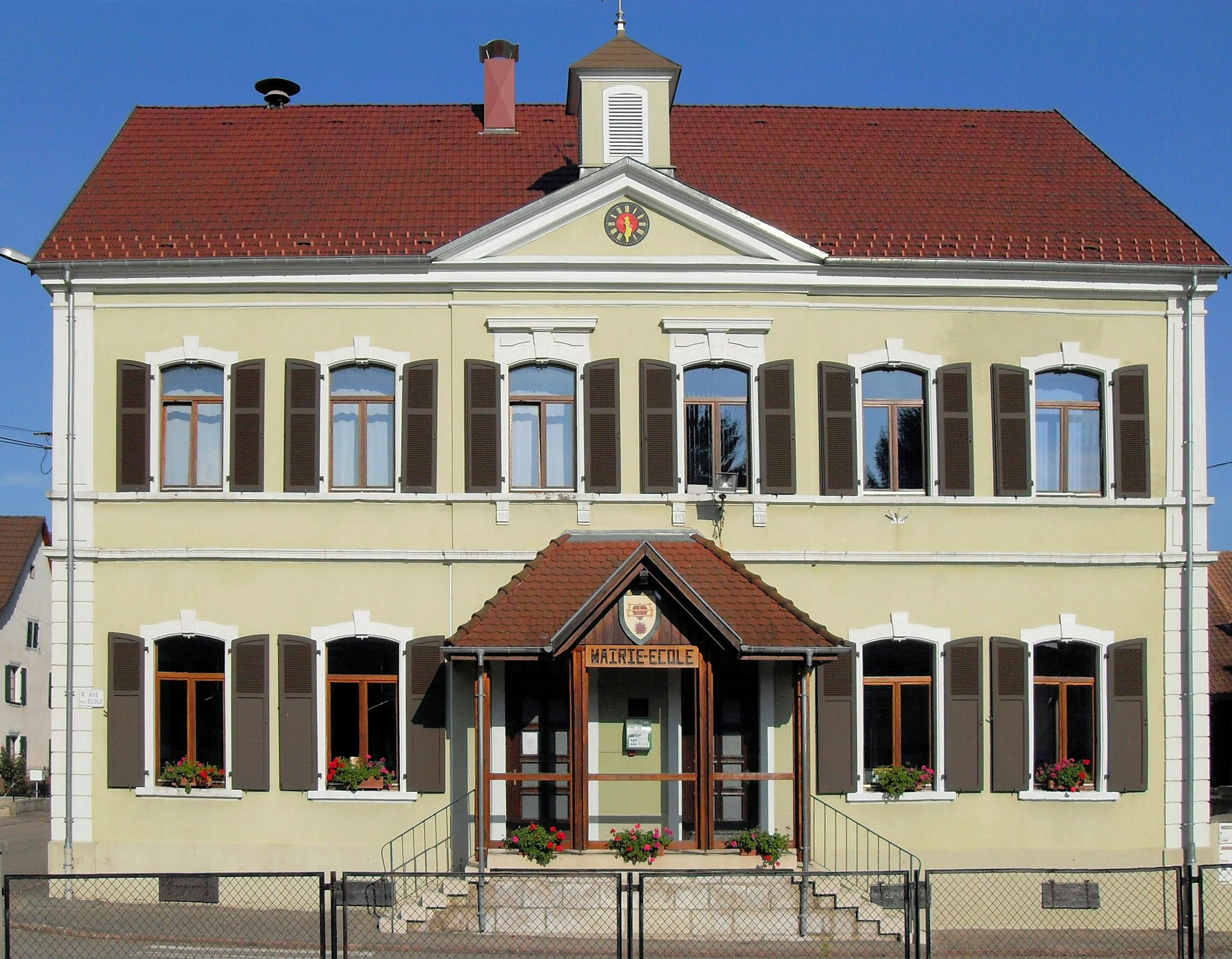
- The town hall and school in Sondersdorf

- Coat of arms
- Location of Sondersdorf
- Location within France Location within Grand Est
- Coordinates: 47°29′02″N 7°20′10″E
- Country: France
- Region: Grand Est
- Department: Haut-Rhin
- Arrondissement: Altkirch
- Canton: Altkirch

Government
  - Mayor (2020–2026): Pierre Blind
- Area^{1}: 8.44 km^{2} (3.26 sq mi)
- Elevation: 510 m (1,670 ft)
- Highest elevation: 784 m (2,572 ft)
- Lowest elevation: 444 m (1,457 ft)
- Population (2023): 319
  - Density: 37.8/km^{2} (97.9/sq mi)
- Time zone: UTC+01:00 (CET)
  - Summer (DST): UTC+02:00 (CEST)
- INSEE/Postal code: 68312 /68480
- ^{1} French Land Register data, which excludes lakes, ponds, glaciers > 1 km^{2} (0.386 sq mi or 247 acres) and river estuaries.

Sondersdorf is a commune in the Haut-Rhin department in Alsace in north-eastern France.

== See also ==
- Communes of the Haut-Rhin department
