= Hundsbach, Haut-Rhin =

Commune in Grand Est, France

Hundsbach
- Commune
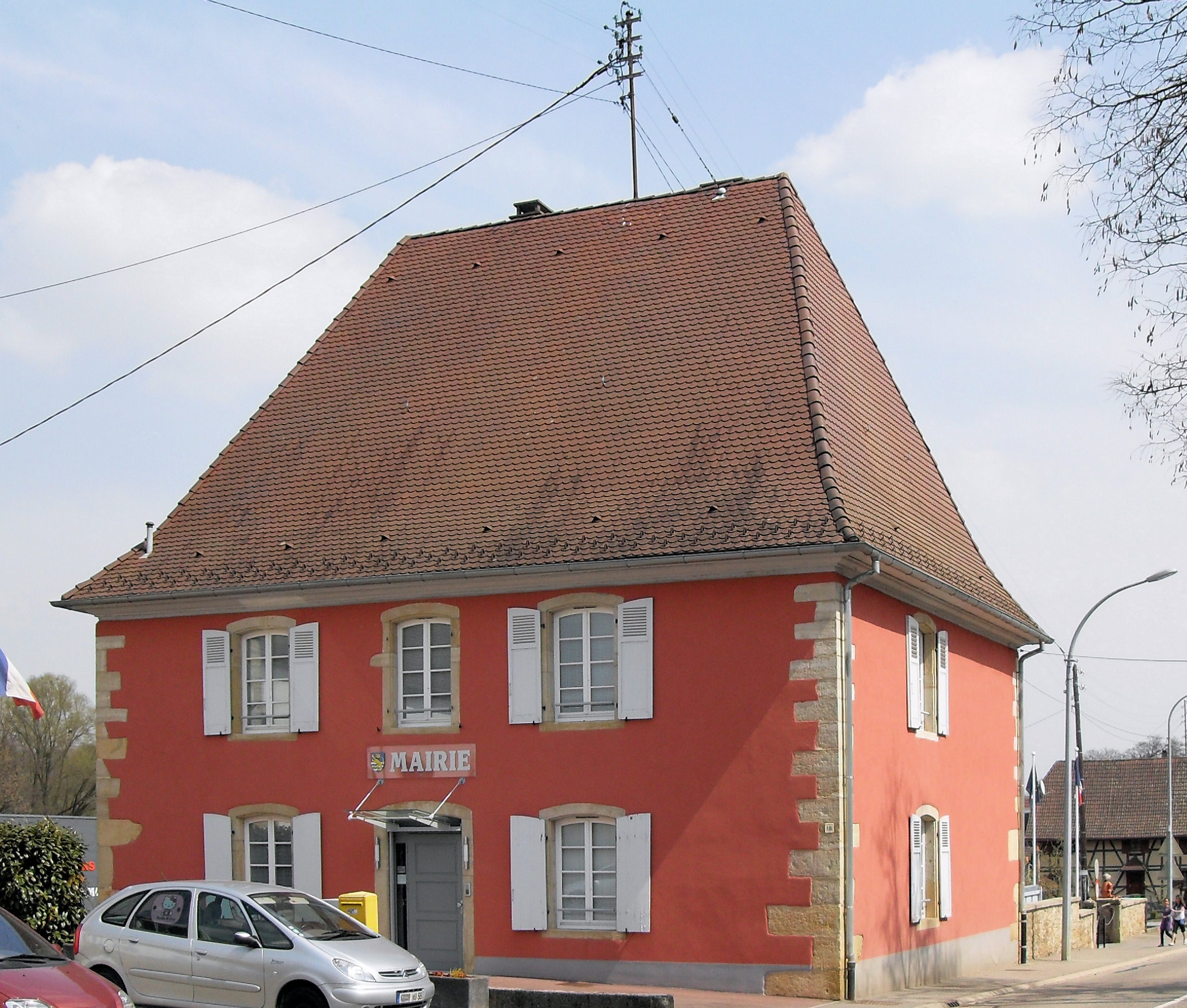
- The town hall in Hundsbach

- Coat of arms
- Location of Hundsbach
- Location within France Location within Grand Est
- Coordinates: 47°36′11″N 7°20′03″E
- Country: France
- Region: Grand Est
- Department: Haut-Rhin
- Arrondissement: Altkirch
- Canton: Altkirch

Government
  - Mayor (2020–2026): Philippe Rufi
- Area^{1}: 4.03 km^{2} (1.56 sq mi)
- Elevation: 335 m (1,099 ft)
- Highest elevation: 418 m (1,371 ft)
- Lowest elevation: 320 m (1,050 ft)
- Population (2023): 357
  - Density: 88.6/km^{2} (229/sq mi)
- Time zone: UTC+01:00 (CET)
  - Summer (DST): UTC+02:00 (CEST)
- INSEE/Postal code: 68148 /68130
- ^{1} French Land Register data, which excludes lakes, ponds, glaciers > 1 km^{2} (0.386 sq mi or 247 acres) and river estuaries.

For Hundsbach in Germany, see Hundsbach.

Hundsbach is a commune in the Haut-Rhin department in Alsace in north-eastern France. The Mayor of Hundsbach, was reelected on March 21, 2026, for his fifth term, with ten votes and one blank ballot. The population of Hundsbach was 357 in 2023.

== See also ==
- Communes of the Haut-Rhin département
