= Hausgauen =

Commune in Grand Est, France

- Commune
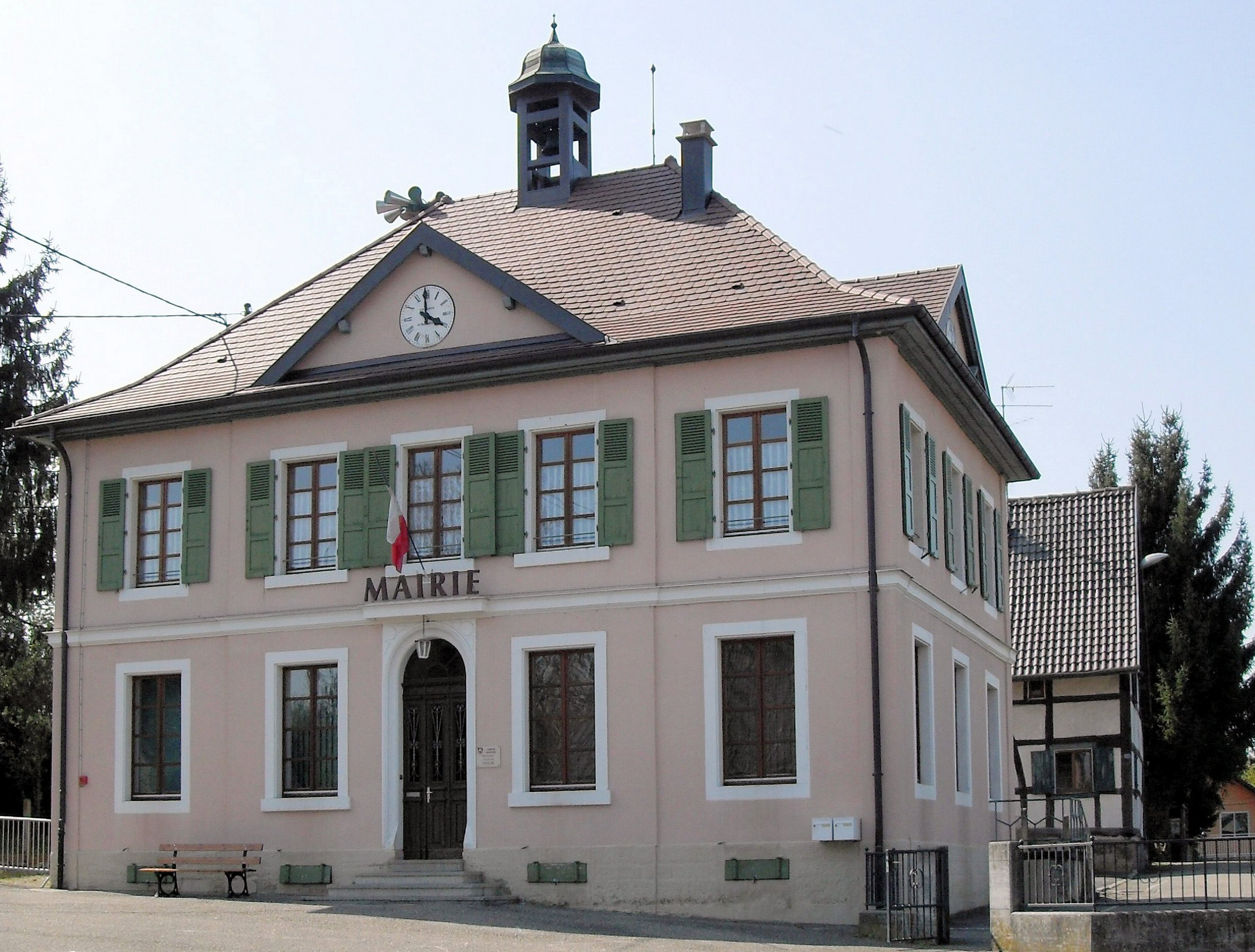
- The town hall in Hausgauen

- Coat of arms
- Location of Hausgauen
- Location within France Location within Grand Est
- Coordinates: 47°36′15″N 7°19′20″E
- Country: France
- Region: Grand Est
- Department: Haut-Rhin
- Arrondissement: Altkirch
- Canton: Altkirch

Government
  - Mayor (2020–2026): Joseph Maurice Wiss
- Area^{1}: 5.79 km^{2} (2.24 sq mi)
- Elevation: 315 m (1,033 ft)
- Highest elevation: 404 m (1,325 ft)
- Lowest elevation: 302 m (991 ft)
- Population (2023): 369
  - Density: 63.7/km^{2} (165/sq mi)
- Time zone: UTC+01:00 (CET)
  - Summer (DST): UTC+02:00 (CEST)
- INSEE/Postal code: 68124 /68130
- ^{1} French Land Register data, which excludes lakes, ponds, glaciers > 1 km^{2} (0.386 sq mi or 247 acres) and river estuaries.

Hausgauen (French pronunciation: [ausɡauən]) is a commune in the Haut-Rhin department and Grand Est region of north-eastern France.

== See also ==
- Communes of the Haut-Rhin département
