= Obermorschwiller =

Commune in Grand Est, France

- Commune
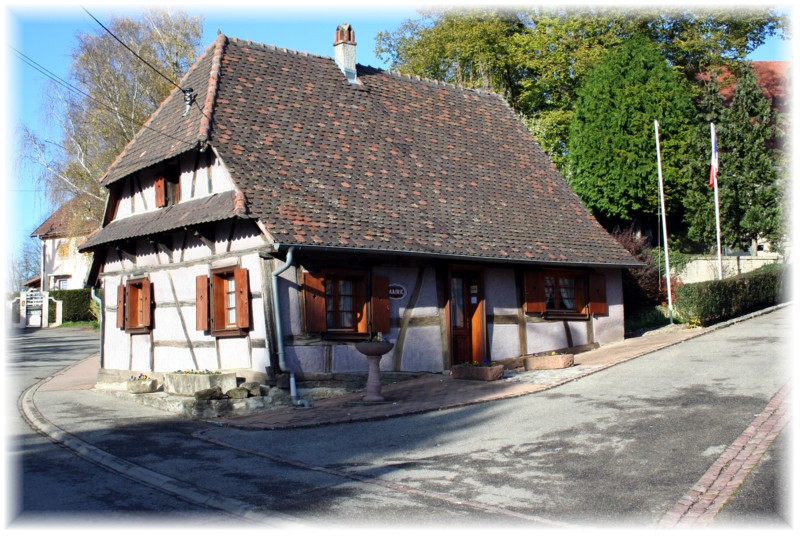
- The town hall in Obermorschwiller

- Coat of arms
- Location of Obermorschwiller
- Location within France Location within Grand Est
- Coordinates: 47°38′44″N 7°18′42″E
- Country: France
- Region: Grand Est
- Department: Haut-Rhin
- Arrondissement: Altkirch
- Canton: Altkirch
- Intercommunality: Sundgau

Government
  - Mayor (2020–2026): Georges Riss
- Area^{1}: 6.05 km^{2} (2.34 sq mi)
- Elevation: 260 m (850 ft)
- Highest elevation: 368 m (1,207 ft)
- Lowest elevation: 284 m (932 ft)
- Population (2023): 409
  - Density: 67.6/km^{2} (175/sq mi)
- Time zone: UTC+01:00 (CET)
  - Summer (DST): UTC+02:00 (CEST)
- INSEE/Postal code: 68245 /68130
- ^{1} French Land Register data, which excludes lakes, ponds, glaciers > 1 km^{2} (0.386 sq mi or 247 acres) and river estuaries.

Obermorschwiller (German: Obermorschweiler) is a commune in the Haut-Rhin department in Alsace in north-eastern France.

== Population ==
Historical population
Year	Pop.	±% p.a.
1968	251	—
1975	251	+0.00%
1982	277	+1.42%
1990	368	+3.61%
1999	424	+1.59%
2007	439	+0.44%
2012	400	−1.84%
2017	407	+0.35%
2023	409	+0.08%
Source: INSEE

== See also ==
- Communes of the Haut-Rhin department
