= Bettendorf, Haut-Rhin =

Commune in Grand Est, France

Bettendorf
- Commune
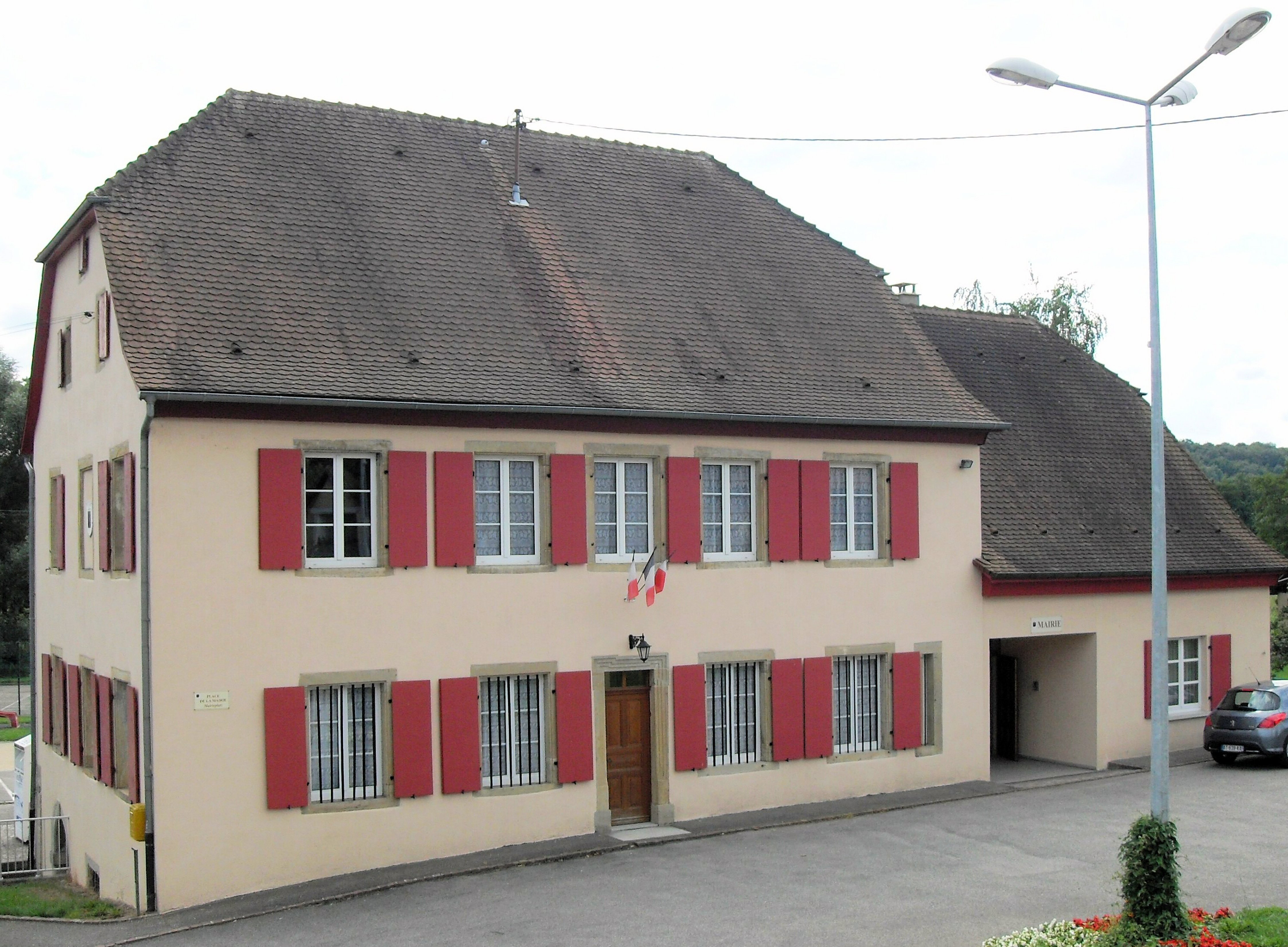
- The town hall in Bettendorf

- Coat of arms
- Location of Bettendorf
- Location within France Location within Grand Est
- Coordinates: 47°35′04″N 7°16′38″E
- Country: France
- Region: Grand Est
- Department: Haut-Rhin
- Arrondissement: Altkirch
- Canton: Altkirch

Government
  - Mayor (2020–2026): Jean Zurbach
- Area^{1}: 4.73 km^{2} (1.83 sq mi)
- Elevation: 331 m (1,086 ft)
- Highest elevation: 407 m (1,335 ft)
- Lowest elevation: 321 m (1,053 ft)
- Population (2023): 469
  - Density: 99.2/km^{2} (257/sq mi)
- Time zone: UTC+01:00 (CET)
  - Summer (DST): UTC+02:00 (CEST)
- INSEE/Postal code: 68033 /68560
- ^{1} French Land Register data, which excludes lakes, ponds, glaciers > 1 km^{2} (0.386 sq mi or 247 acres) and river estuaries.

Bettendorf (French pronunciation: [bɛtəndɔʁf]) is a commune in the Haut-Rhin department in Alsace in north-eastern France.

== See also ==
- Communes of the Haut-Rhin department
