= Emlingen =

Commune in Grand Est, France

- Commune
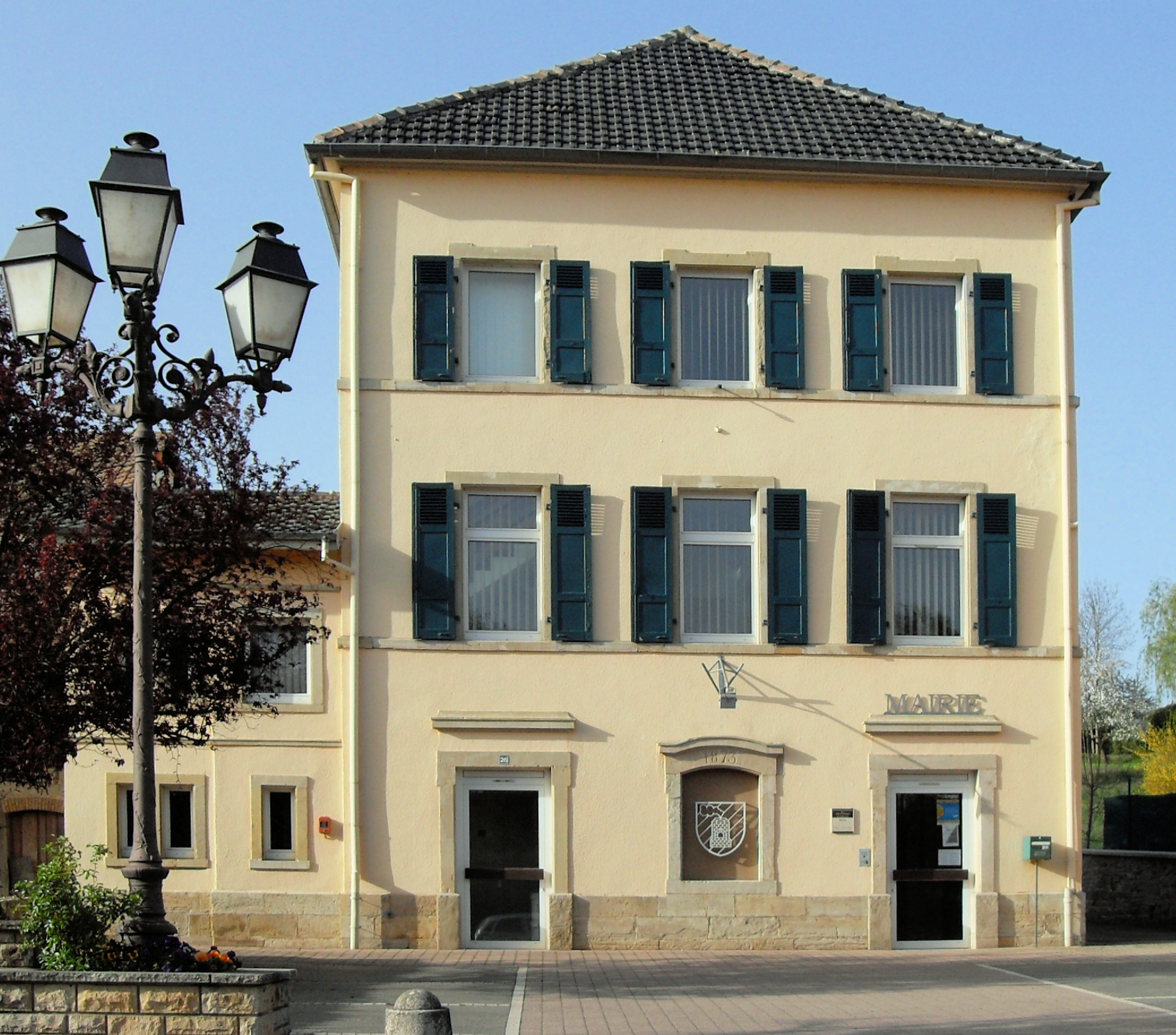
- The town hall in Emlingen

- Coat of arms
- Location of Emlingen
- Location within France Location within Grand Est
- Coordinates: 47°37′28″N 7°17′30″E
- Country: France
- Region: Grand Est
- Department: Haut-Rhin
- Arrondissement: Altkirch
- Canton: Altkirch

Government
  - Mayor (2020–2026): Isabelle Steffan
- Area^{1}: 2.42 km^{2} (0.93 sq mi)
- Elevation: 295 m (968 ft)
- Highest elevation: 376 m (1,234 ft)
- Lowest elevation: 286 m (938 ft)
- Population (2023): 307
  - Density: 127/km^{2} (329/sq mi)
- Time zone: UTC+01:00 (CET)
  - Summer (DST): UTC+02:00 (CEST)
- INSEE/Postal code: 68080 /68130
- ^{1} French Land Register data, which excludes lakes, ponds, glaciers > 1 km^{2} (0.386 sq mi or 247 acres) and river estuaries.

Emlingen (French pronunciation: [ɛmliŋ(ɡ)ən]) is a commune in the Haut-Rhin department in Alsace in north-eastern France.

== See also ==
- Communes of the Haut-Rhin département
