= Walheim, Haut-Rhin =

Commune in Grand Est, France

Walheim Wàhle
- Commune
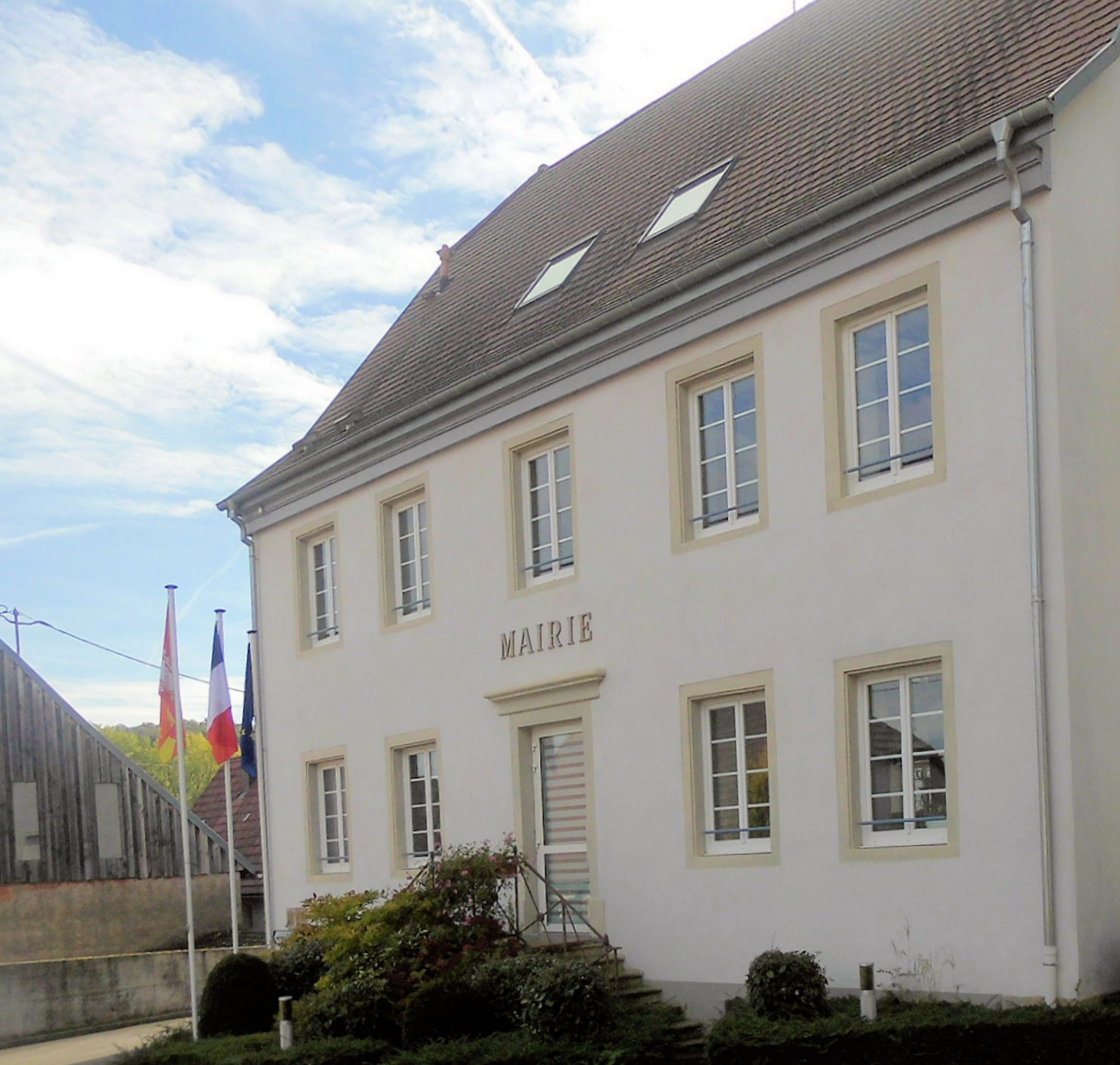
- The town hall in Walheim

- Coat of arms
- Location of Walheim
- Location within France Location within Grand Est
- Coordinates: 47°38′34″N 7°16′01″E
- Country: France
- Region: Grand Est
- Department: Haut-Rhin
- Arrondissement: Altkirch
- Canton: Altkirch
- Intercommunality: Sundgau

Government
  - Mayor (2020–2026): Michel Pflieger
- Area^{1}: 4.83 km^{2} (1.86 sq mi)
- Elevation: 285 m (935 ft)
- Highest elevation: 393 m (1,289 ft)
- Lowest elevation: 267 m (876 ft)
- Population (2023): 889
  - Density: 184/km^{2} (477/sq mi)
- Time zone: UTC+01:00 (CET)
  - Summer (DST): UTC+02:00 (CEST)
- INSEE/Postal code: 68356 /68130
- ^{1} French Land Register data, which excludes lakes, ponds, glaciers > 1 km^{2} (0.386 sq mi or 247 acres) and river estuaries.

Walheim (French pronunciation: [valaim]; Alemannic German: Wàhle) is a commune in the Haut-Rhin department in Alsace in north-eastern France.

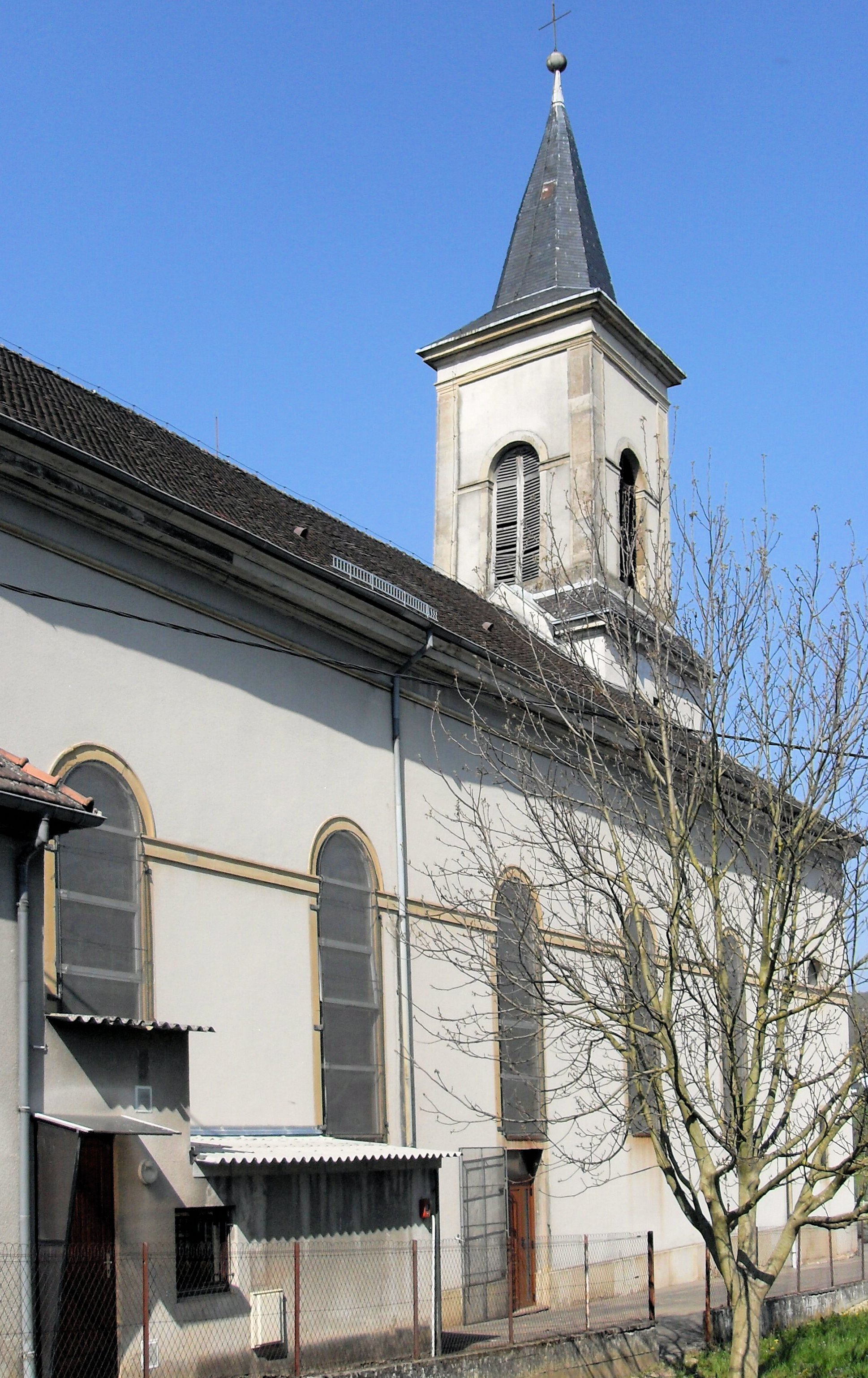
Saint Martin Church

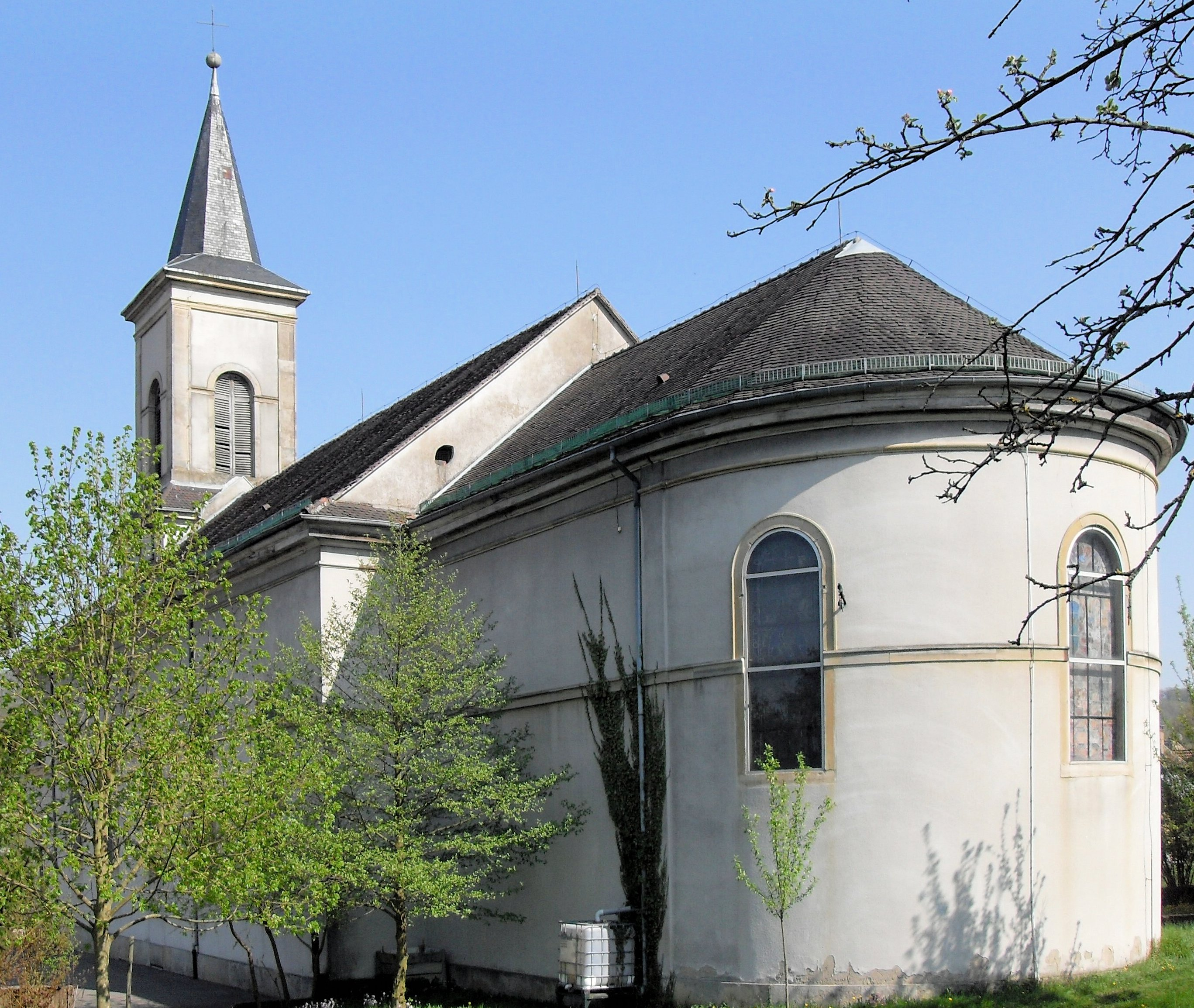
Saint Martin Church

== Population ==
Historical population
Year	Pop.	±% p.a.
1968	693	—
1975	696	+0.06%
1982	726	+0.60%
1990	716	−0.17%
1999	746	+0.46%
2007	886	+2.17%
2012	951	+1.43%
2017	896	−1.18%
2023	889	−0.13%
Source: INSEE

== See also ==
- Communes of the Haut-Rhin department
