= Bisel, Haut-Rhin =

Commune in Grand Est, France

Bisel
- Commune
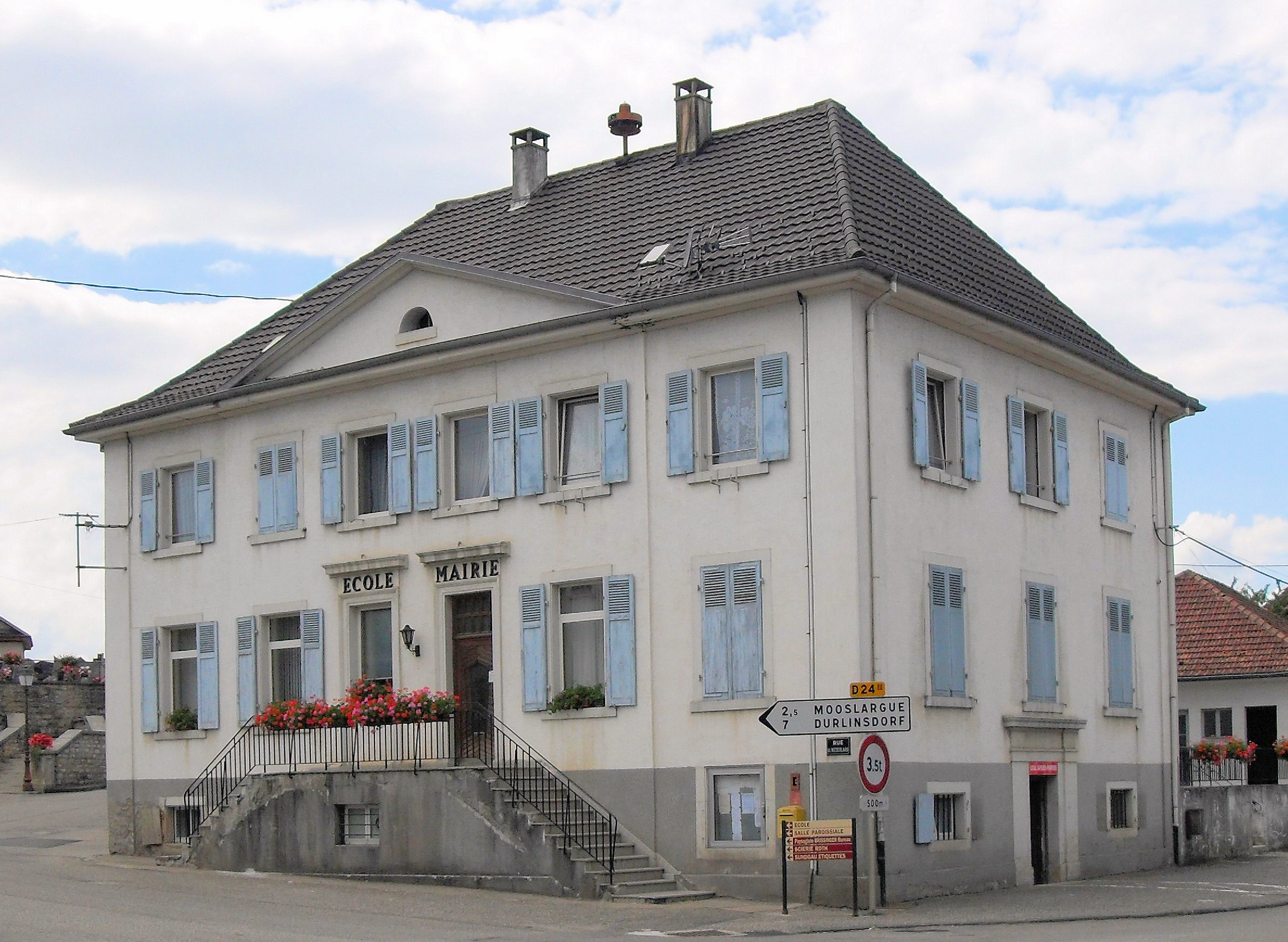
- The town hall and school in Bisel

- Coat of arms
- Location of Bisel
- Location within France Location within Grand Est
- Coordinates: 47°32′10″N 7°13′09″E
- Country: France
- Region: Grand Est
- Department: Haut-Rhin
- Arrondissement: Altkirch
- Canton: Altkirch

Government
  - Mayor (2020–2026): Joseph Berbett
- Area^{1}: 8.1 km^{2} (3.1 sq mi)
- Elevation: 411 m (1,348 ft)
- Highest elevation: 431 m (1,414 ft)
- Lowest elevation: 386 m (1,266 ft)
- Population (2023): 537
  - Density: 66/km^{2} (170/sq mi)
- Time zone: UTC+01:00 (CET)
  - Summer (DST): UTC+02:00 (CEST)
- INSEE/Postal code: 68039 /68580
- ^{1} French Land Register data, which excludes lakes, ponds, glaciers > 1 km^{2} (0.386 sq mi or 247 acres) and river estuaries.

Bisel (French pronunciation: [bizɛl]) is a commune in the Haut-Rhin department in Alsace in north-eastern France.

== See also ==
- Communes of the Haut-Rhin department
