= Heiwiller =

Commune in Grand Est, France

- Commune
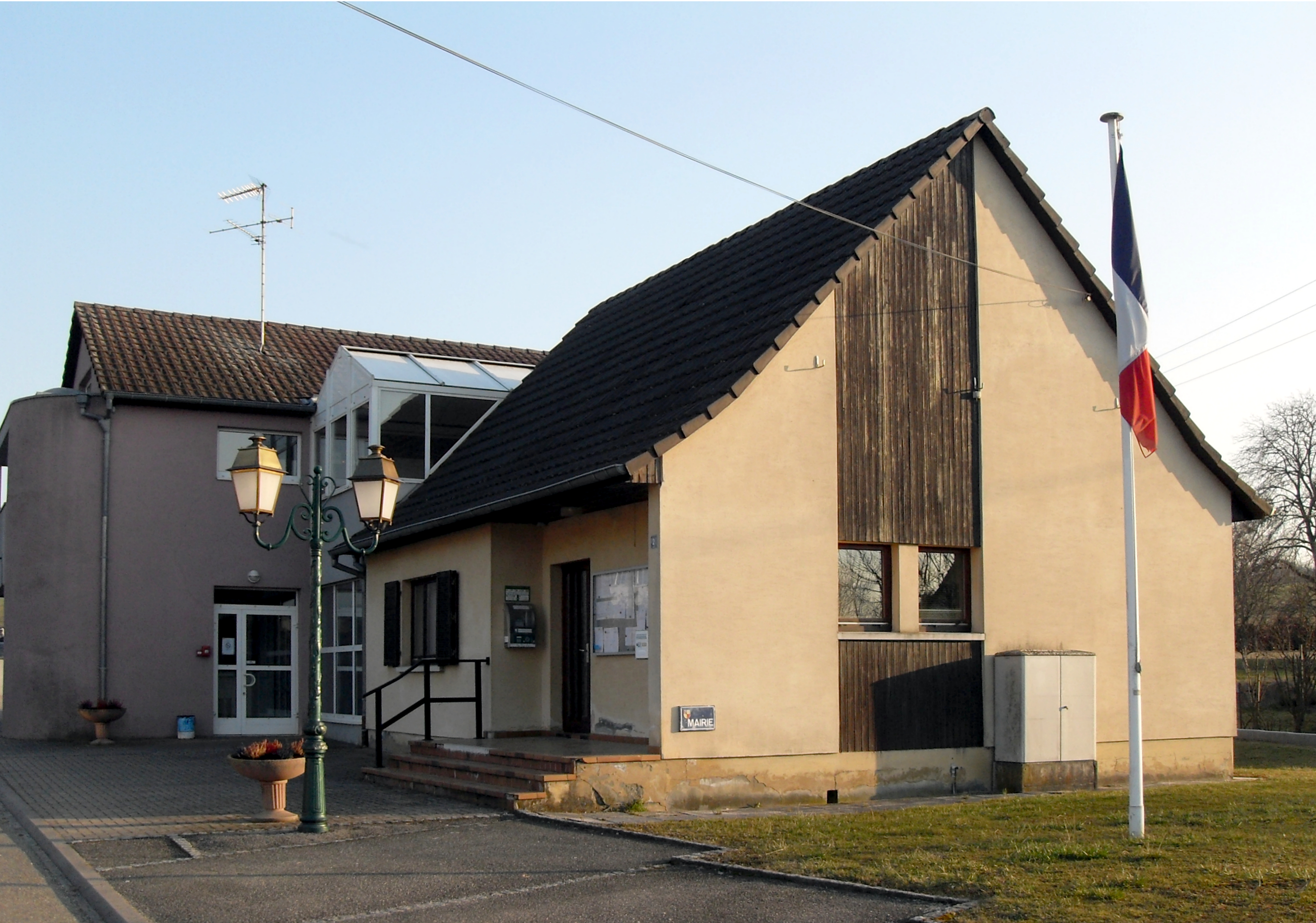
- The town hall in Heiwiller

- Coat of arms
- Location of Heiwiller
- Location within France Location within Grand Est
- Coordinates: 47°37′29″N 7°19′14″E
- Country: France
- Region: Grand Est
- Department: Haut-Rhin
- Arrondissement: Altkirch
- Canton: Altkirch

Government
  - Mayor (2023–2026): Chantal Wiss
- Area^{1}: 2.04 km^{2} (0.79 sq mi)
- Elevation: 310 m (1,020 ft)
- Highest elevation: 372 m (1,220 ft)
- Lowest elevation: 300 m (980 ft)
- Population (2023): 190
  - Density: 93/km^{2} (240/sq mi)
- Time zone: UTC+01:00 (CET)
  - Summer (DST): UTC+02:00 (CEST)
- INSEE/Postal code: 68131 /68130
- ^{1} French Land Register data, which excludes lakes, ponds, glaciers > 1 km^{2} (0.386 sq mi or 247 acres) and river estuaries.

Heiwiller (French pronunciation: [aivilɛʁ]; German: Heiweiler) is a commune in the Haut-Rhin department in Alsace in north-eastern France.

== See also ==
- Communes of the Haut-Rhin département
