= Kœstlach =

Commune in Grand Est, France

Kœstlach Cheschli
- Commune
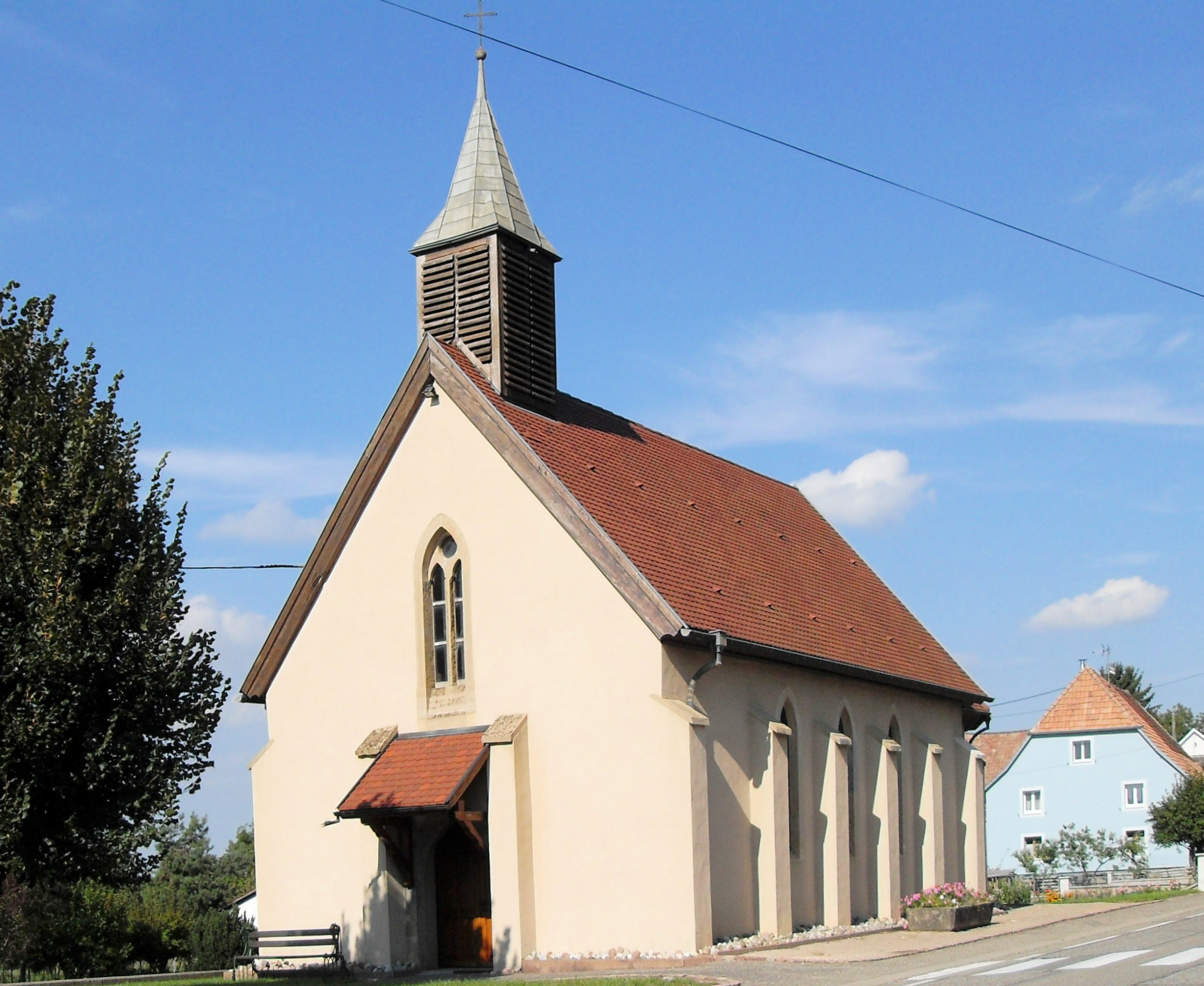
- Notre-Dame-des-Douleurs Chapel in Kœstlach

- Coat of arms
- Location of Kœstlach
- Location within France Location within Grand Est
- Coordinates: 47°30′25″N 7°16′19″E
- Country: France
- Region: Grand Est
- Department: Haut-Rhin
- Arrondissement: Altkirch
- Canton: Altkirch

Government
  - Mayor (2020–2026): André Lehmes
- Area^{1}: 8.23 km^{2} (3.18 sq mi)
- Elevation: 468 m (1,535 ft)
- Highest elevation: 650 m (2,130 ft)
- Lowest elevation: 423 m (1,388 ft)
- Population (2023): 505
  - Density: 61.4/km^{2} (159/sq mi)
- Time zone: UTC+01:00 (CET)
  - Summer (DST): UTC+02:00 (CEST)
- INSEE/Postal code: 68169 /68480
- ^{1} French Land Register data, which excludes lakes, ponds, glaciers > 1 km^{2} (0.386 sq mi or 247 acres) and river estuaries.

Kœstlach (French pronunciation: [kœstlax]; Alemannic German: Cheschli; German: Köstlach) is a commune in the Haut-Rhin department in Alsace in north-eastern France.

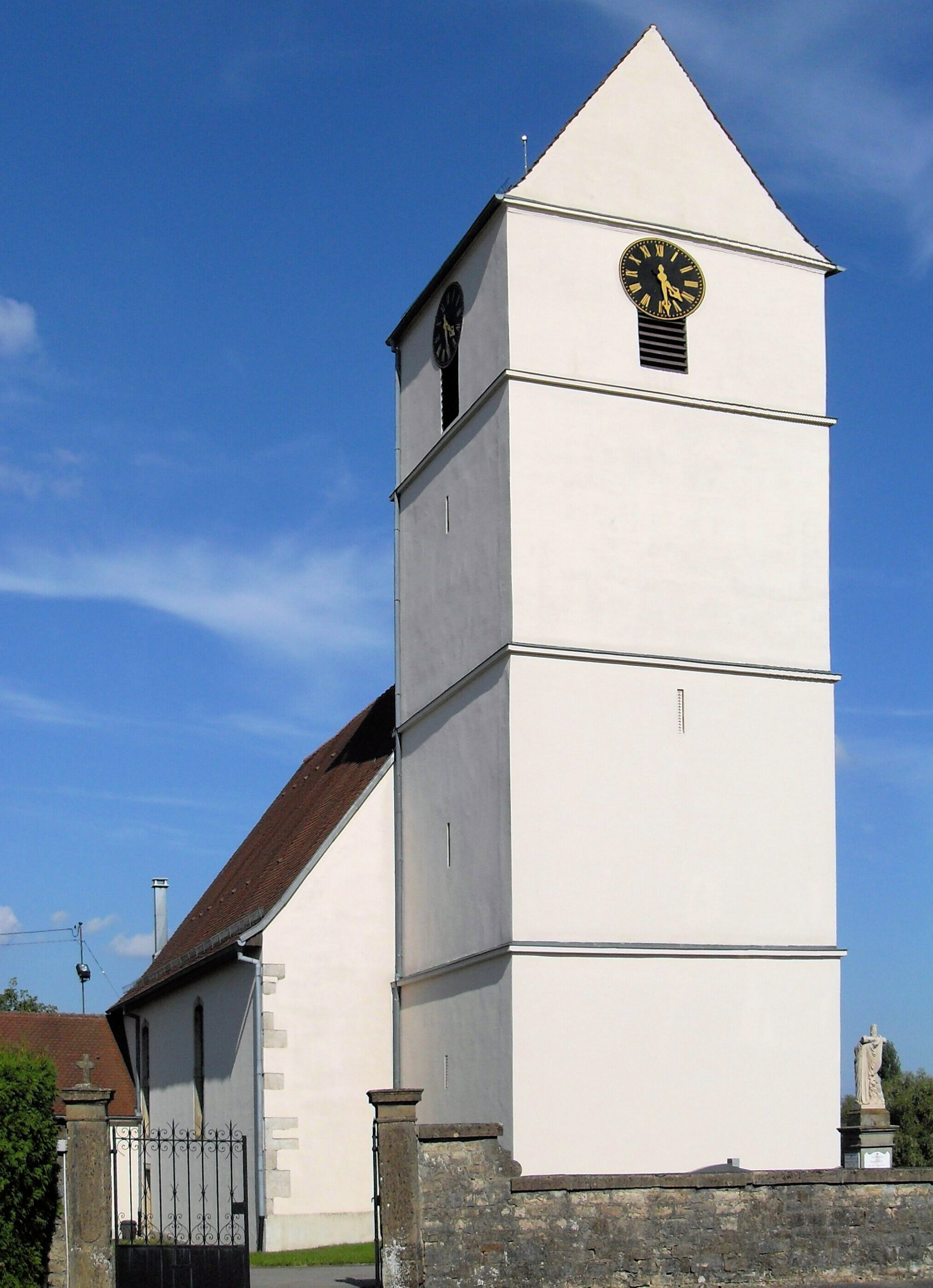
Saint Leodegar Church

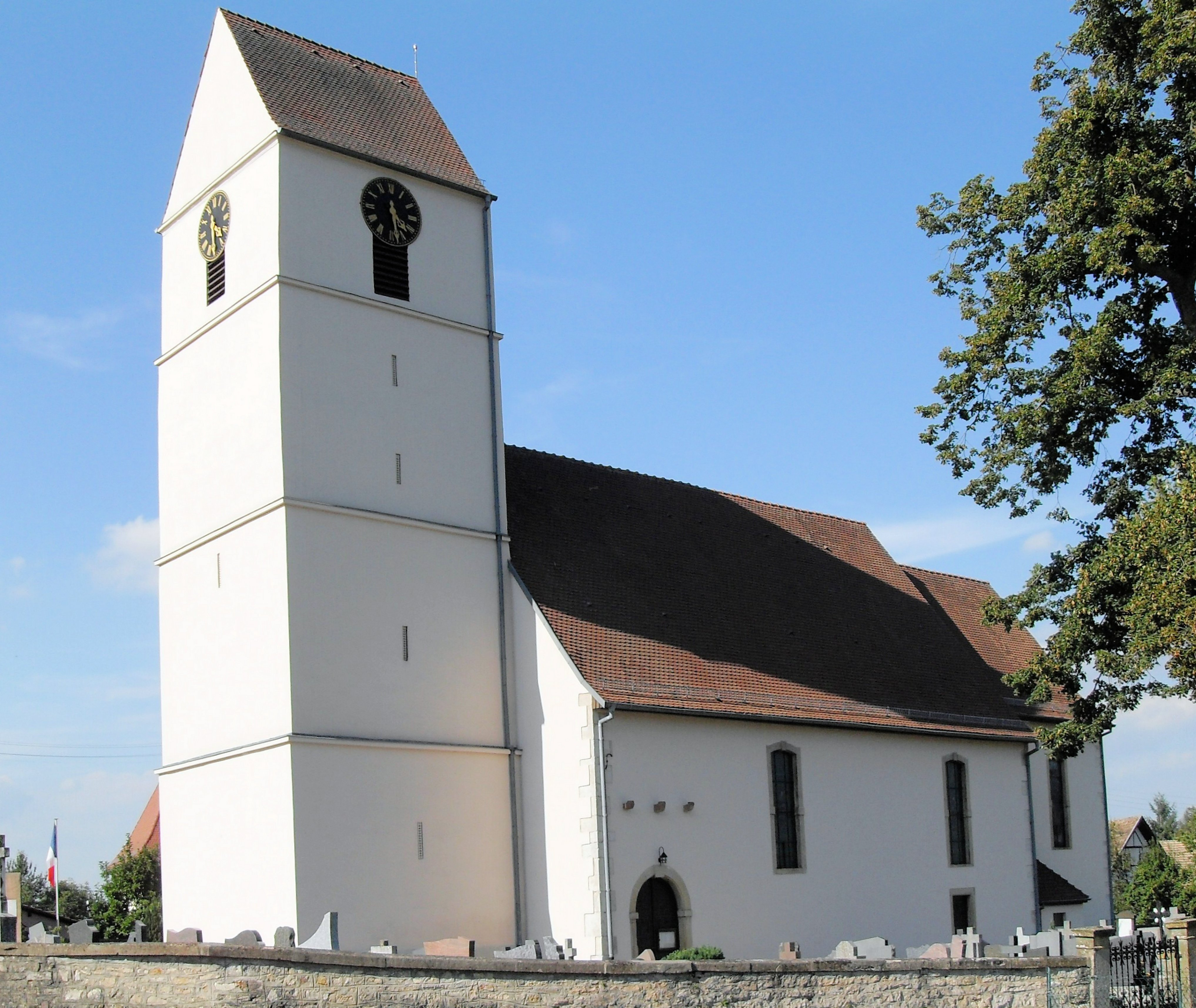
Saint Leodegar Church

== Population ==
Historical population
Year	Pop.	±% p.a.
1968	352	—
1975	344	−0.33%
1982	358	+0.57%
1990	393	+1.17%
1999	417	+0.66%
2007	502	+2.35%
2012	513	+0.43%
2017	506	−0.27%
2023	505	−0.03%
Source: INSEE

== See also ==
- Communes of the Haut-Rhin département
