= Tagolsheim =

Commune in Grand Est, France

- Commune
- The town hall in Tagolsheim

- Coat of arms
- Location of Tagolsheim
- Location within France Location within Grand Est
- Coordinates: 47°39′22″N 7°16′15″E
- Country: France
- Region: Grand Est
- Department: Haut-Rhin
- Arrondissement: Altkirch
- Canton: Altkirch
- Intercommunality: Sundgau

Government
  - Mayor (2020–2026): Hervé Wermuth
- Area^{1}: 3.19 km^{2} (1.23 sq mi)
- Elevation: 265 m (869 ft)
- Highest elevation: 367 m (1,204 ft)
- Lowest elevation: 262 m (860 ft)
- Population (2023): 991
  - Density: 311/km^{2} (805/sq mi)
- Time zone: UTC+01:00 (CET)
  - Summer (DST): UTC+02:00 (CEST)
- INSEE/Postal code: 68332 /68720
- ^{1} French Land Register data, which excludes lakes, ponds, glaciers > 1 km^{2} (0.386 sq mi or 247 acres) and river estuaries.

Tagolsheim is a commune in the Haut-Rhin department in Alsace in north-eastern France.

== Population ==
Historical population
Year	Pop.	±% p.a.
1968	460	—
1975	625	+4.48%
1982	698	+1.59%
1990	691	−0.13%
1999	662	−0.48%
2007	668	+0.11%
2012	741	+2.10%
2017	928	+4.60%
2023	991	+1.10%
Source: INSEE

== See also ==
- Communes of the Haut-Rhin department
