= Luemschwiller =

Commune in Grand Est, France

- Commune
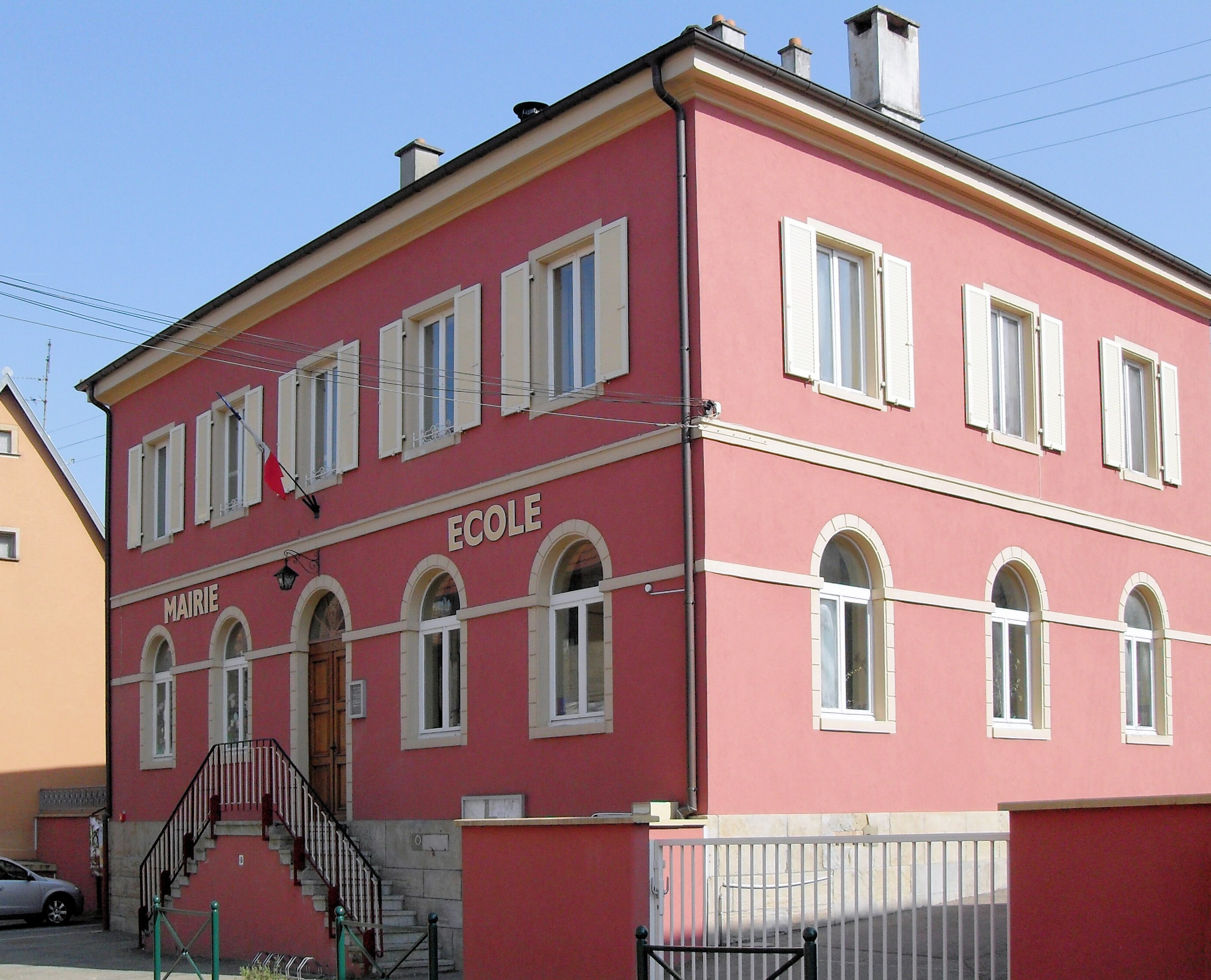
- The town hall and school in Luemschwiller

- Coat of arms
- Location of Luemschwiller
- Location within France Location within Grand Est
- Coordinates: 47°39′21″N 7°17′24″E
- Country: France
- Region: Grand Est
- Department: Haut-Rhin
- Arrondissement: Altkirch
- Canton: Altkirch

Government
  - Mayor (2020–2026): Germain Goepfert
- Area^{1}: 7.27 km^{2} (2.81 sq mi)
- Elevation: 315 m (1,033 ft)
- Highest elevation: 408 m (1,339 ft)
- Lowest elevation: 283 m (928 ft)
- Population (2023): 746
  - Density: 103/km^{2} (266/sq mi)
- Time zone: UTC+01:00 (CET)
  - Summer (DST): UTC+02:00 (CEST)
- INSEE/Postal code: 68191 /68720
- ^{1} French Land Register data, which excludes lakes, ponds, glaciers > 1 km^{2} (0.386 sq mi or 247 acres) and river estuaries.

Luemschwiller (French pronunciation: [lymʃvilɛʁ]; German: Lümschweiler) is a commune in the Haut-Rhin department in Alsace in north-eastern France.

== See also ==
- Communes of the Haut-Rhin département
