= Mœrnach =

Commune in Grand Est, France

- Commune
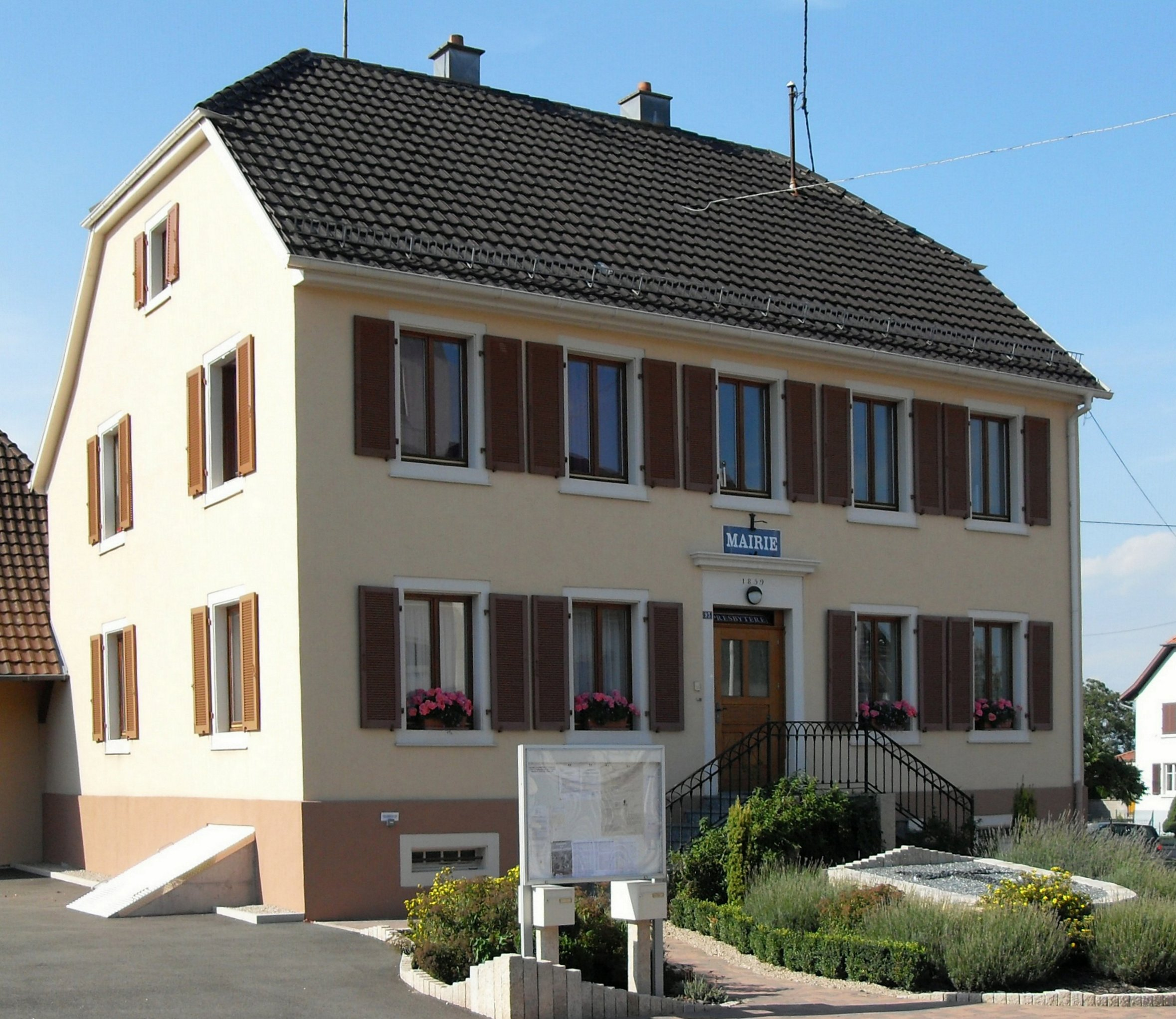
- The town hall in Mœrnach

- Coat of arms
- Location of Mœrnach
- Location within France Location within Grand Est
- Coordinates: 47°30′16″N 7°15′21″E
- Country: France
- Region: Grand Est
- Department: Haut-Rhin
- Arrondissement: Altkirch
- Canton: Altkirch

Government
  - Mayor (2020–2026): Patrick Stemmelin
- Area^{1}: 6.79 km^{2} (2.62 sq mi)
- Elevation: 472 m (1,549 ft)
- Highest elevation: 644 m (2,113 ft)
- Lowest elevation: 417 m (1,368 ft)
- Population (2023): 518
  - Density: 76.3/km^{2} (198/sq mi)
- Time zone: UTC+01:00 (CET)
  - Summer (DST): UTC+02:00 (CEST)
- INSEE/Postal code: 68212 /68480
- ^{1} French Land Register data, which excludes lakes, ponds, glaciers > 1 km^{2} (0.386 sq mi or 247 acres) and river estuaries.

Mœrnach (French pronunciation: [mœʁnak]; German: Mörnach; Alsatian: Märnà) is a commune in the Haut-Rhin department in Alsace in north-eastern France.

== See also ==
- Communes of the Haut-Rhin département
