= Schwoben =

Commune in Grand Est, France

- Commune
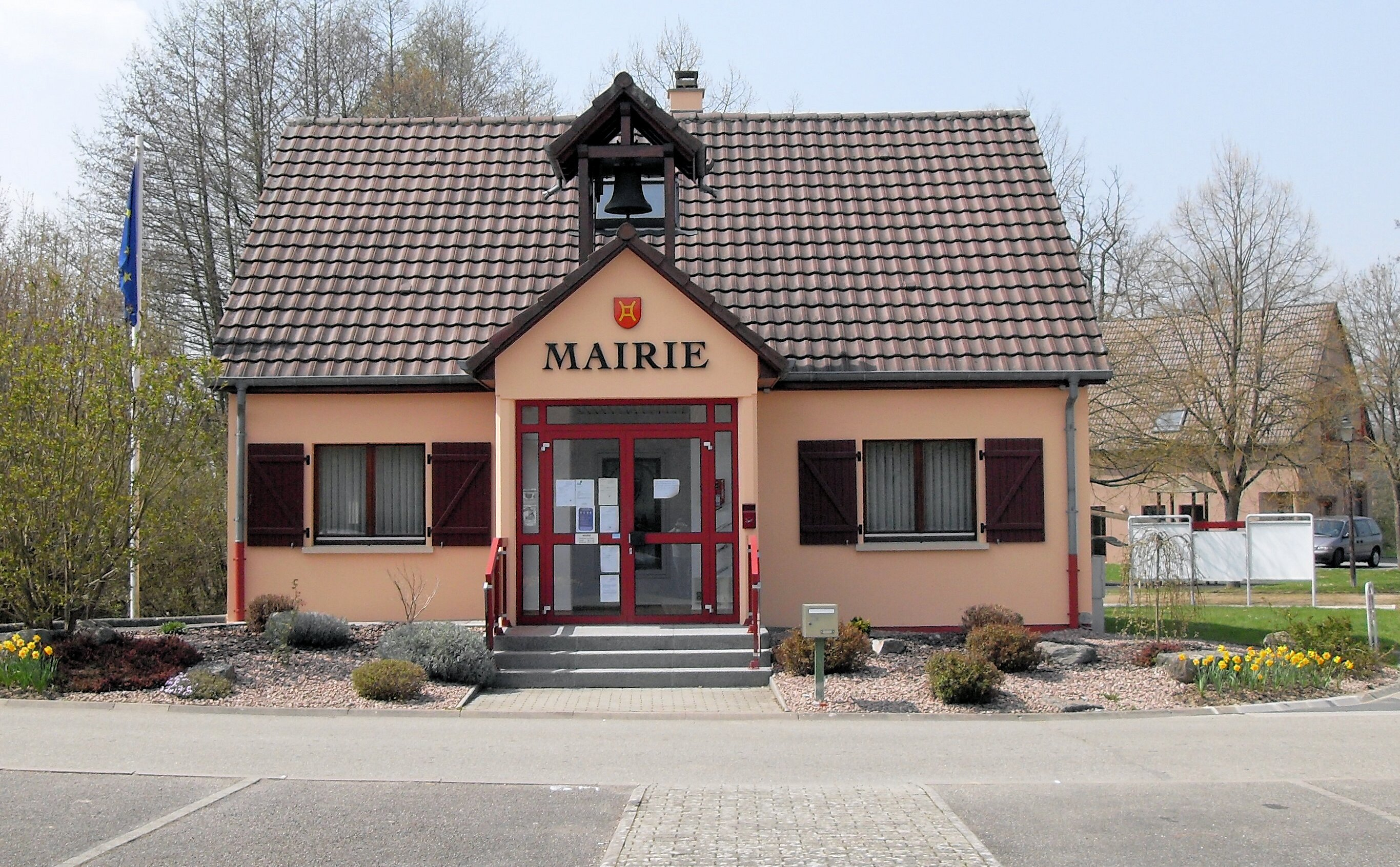
- The town hall in Schwoben

- Coat of arms
- Location of Schwoben
- Location within France Location within Grand Est
- Coordinates: 47°37′01″N 7°18′16″E
- Country: France
- Region: Grand Est
- Department: Haut-Rhin
- Arrondissement: Altkirch
- Canton: Altkirch

Government
  - Mayor (2024–2026): Jean-François Foernbacher
- Area^{1}: 2.38 km^{2} (0.92 sq mi)
- Elevation: 300 m (980 ft)
- Highest elevation: 403 m (1,322 ft)
- Lowest elevation: 296 m (971 ft)
- Population (2023): 229
  - Density: 96.2/km^{2} (249/sq mi)
- Time zone: UTC+01:00 (CET)
  - Summer (DST): UTC+02:00 (CEST)
- INSEE/Postal code: 68303 /68130
- ^{1} French Land Register data, which excludes lakes, ponds, glaciers > 1 km^{2} (0.386 sq mi or 247 acres) and river estuaries.

Schwoben (French pronunciation: [ʃvobœn]; Alsatian: Schwobe) is a commune in the Haut-Rhin department in Alsace in north-eastern France.

== See also ==
- Communes of the Haut-Rhin department
