= Roppentzwiller =

Commune in Grand Est, France

- Commune
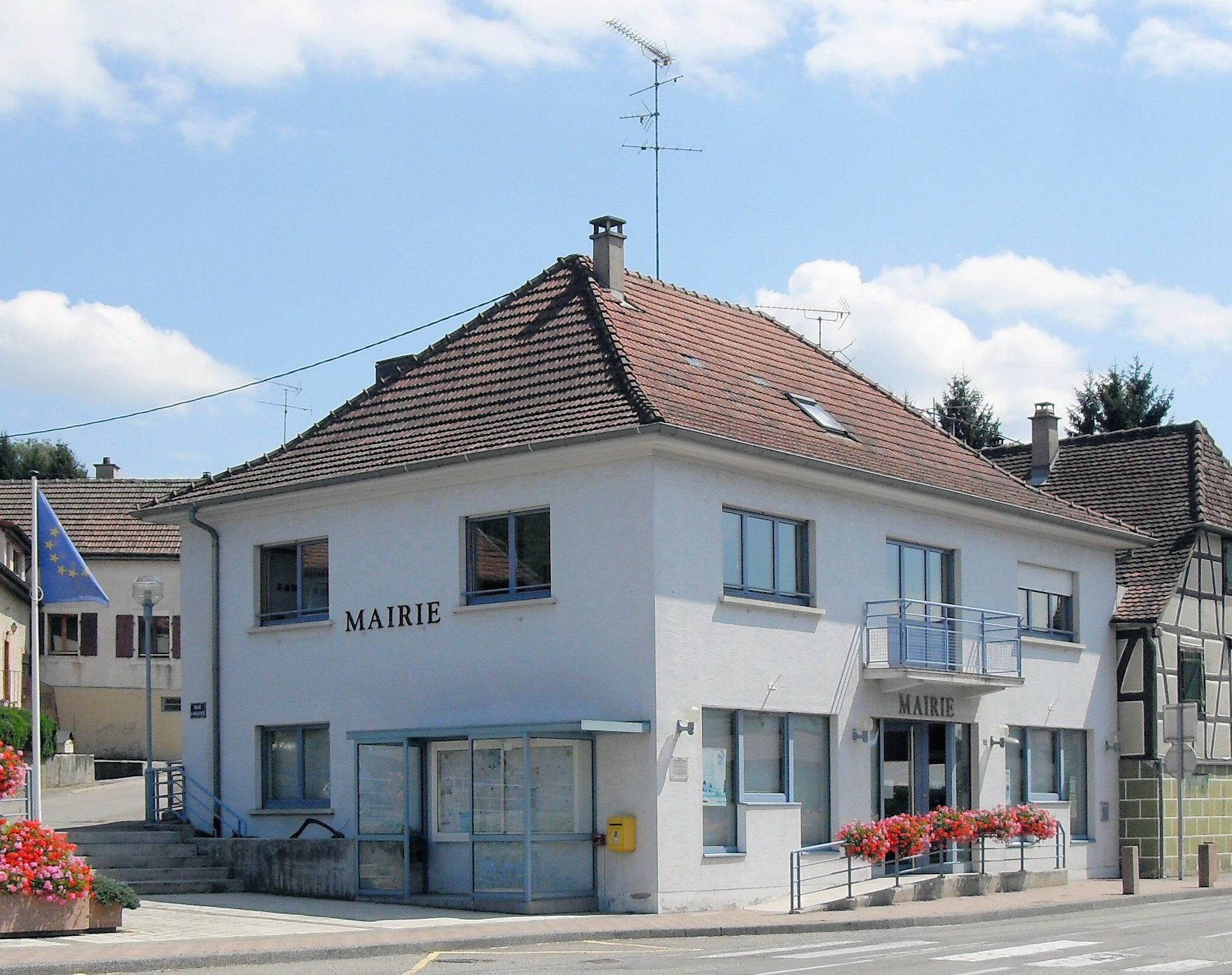
- The town hall in Roppentzwiller

- Coat of arms
- Location of Roppentzwiller
- Location within France Location within Grand Est
- Coordinates: 47°32′28″N 7°19′57″E
- Country: France
- Region: Grand Est
- Department: Haut-Rhin
- Arrondissement: Altkirch
- Canton: Altkirch

Government
  - Mayor (2020–2026): Jean-Claude Eggenspiller
- Area^{1}: 4.15 km^{2} (1.60 sq mi)
- Elevation: 370 m (1,210 ft)
- Highest elevation: 446 m (1,463 ft)
- Lowest elevation: 350 m (1,150 ft)
- Population (2023): 666
  - Density: 160/km^{2} (416/sq mi)
- Time zone: UTC+01:00 (CET)
  - Summer (DST): UTC+02:00 (CEST)
- INSEE/Postal code: 68284 /68480
- ^{1} French Land Register data, which excludes lakes, ponds, glaciers > 1 km^{2} (0.386 sq mi or 247 acres) and river estuaries.

Roppentzwiller (French pronunciation: [ʁɔpəntsvilɛʁ]; German: Roppenzweiler) is a commune in the Haut-Rhin department in Grand Est in north-eastern France.

== See also ==
- Communes of the Haut-Rhin department
