= Bendorf, Haut-Rhin =

Commune in Grand Est, France

Bendorf
- Commune
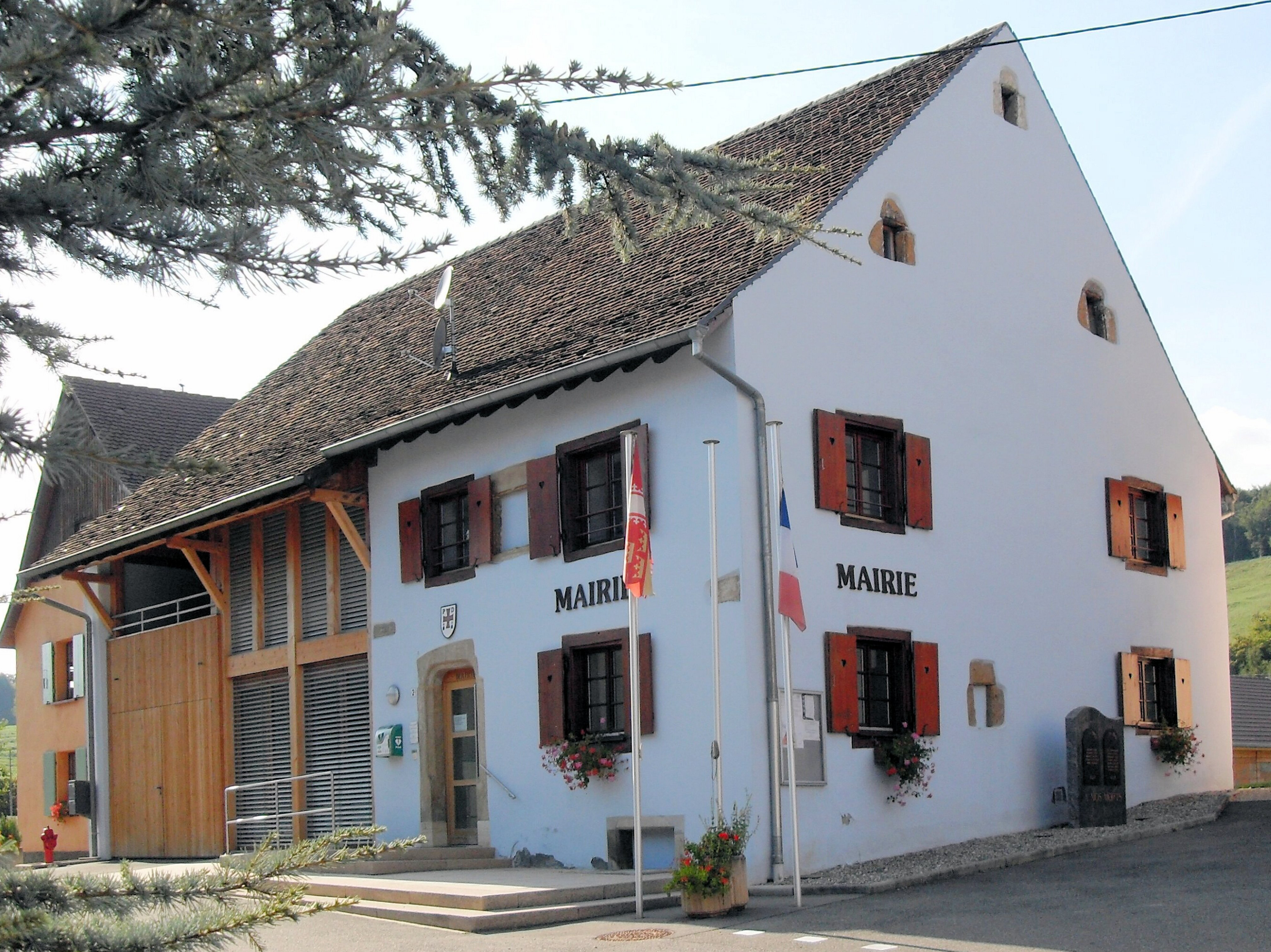
- The town hall in Bendorf

- Coat of arms
- Location of Bendorf
- Location within France Location within Grand Est
- Coordinates: 47°29′18″N 7°16′56″E
- Country: France
- Region: Grand Est
- Department: Haut-Rhin
- Arrondissement: Altkirch
- Canton: Altkirch

Government
  - Mayor (2020–2026): Antoine Antony
- Area^{1}: 7.55 km^{2} (2.92 sq mi)
- Elevation: 540 m (1,770 ft)
- Highest elevation: 680 m (2,230 ft)
- Lowest elevation: 479 m (1,572 ft)
- Population (2023): 245
  - Density: 32.5/km^{2} (84.0/sq mi)
- Time zone: UTC+01:00 (CET)
  - Summer (DST): UTC+02:00 (CEST)
- INSEE/Postal code: 68025 /68480
- ^{1} French Land Register data, which excludes lakes, ponds, glaciers > 1 km^{2} (0.386 sq mi or 247 acres) and river estuaries.

Bendorf (French pronunciation: [bɛndɔʁf]; Alsatian: Bànderf) is a commune in the Haut-Rhin department in Alsace in north-eastern France.

== See also ==
- Communes of the Haut-Rhin department
