= Berentzwiller =

Commune in Grand Est, France

- Commune
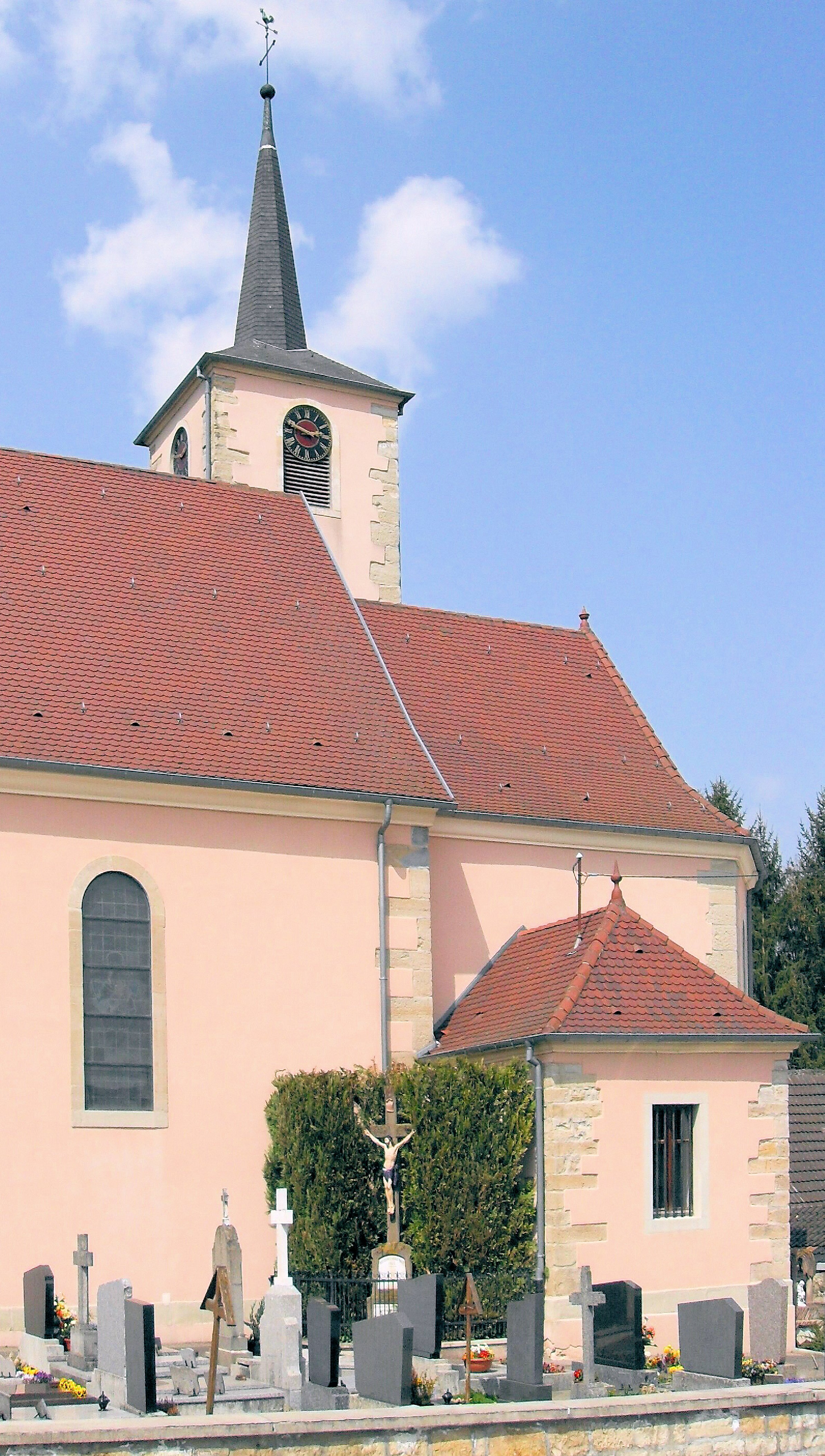
- The church in Berentzwiller

- Coat of arms
- Location of Berentzwiller
- Location within France Location within Grand Est
- Coordinates: 47°35′12″N 7°23′04″E
- Country: France
- Region: Grand Est
- Department: Haut-Rhin
- Arrondissement: Altkirch
- Canton: Altkirch

Government
  - Mayor (2020–2026): Gérard Groelly
- Area^{1}: 6.08 km^{2} (2.35 sq mi)
- Elevation: 360 m (1,180 ft)
- Highest elevation: 439 m (1,440 ft)
- Lowest elevation: 355 m (1,165 ft)
- Population (2023): 339
  - Density: 55.8/km^{2} (144/sq mi)
- Time zone: UTC+01:00 (CET)
  - Summer (DST): UTC+02:00 (CEST)
- INSEE/Postal code: 68027 /68130
- ^{1} French Land Register data, which excludes lakes, ponds, glaciers > 1 km^{2} (0.386 sq mi or 247 acres) and river estuaries.

Berentzwiller (French pronunciation: [beʁəntsvilɛʁ]; German: Berenzweiler) is a commune in the Haut-Rhin department in Alsace in north-eastern France.

== See also ==
- Communes of the Haut-Rhin department
