= Riespach =

Commune in Grand Est, France

- Commune
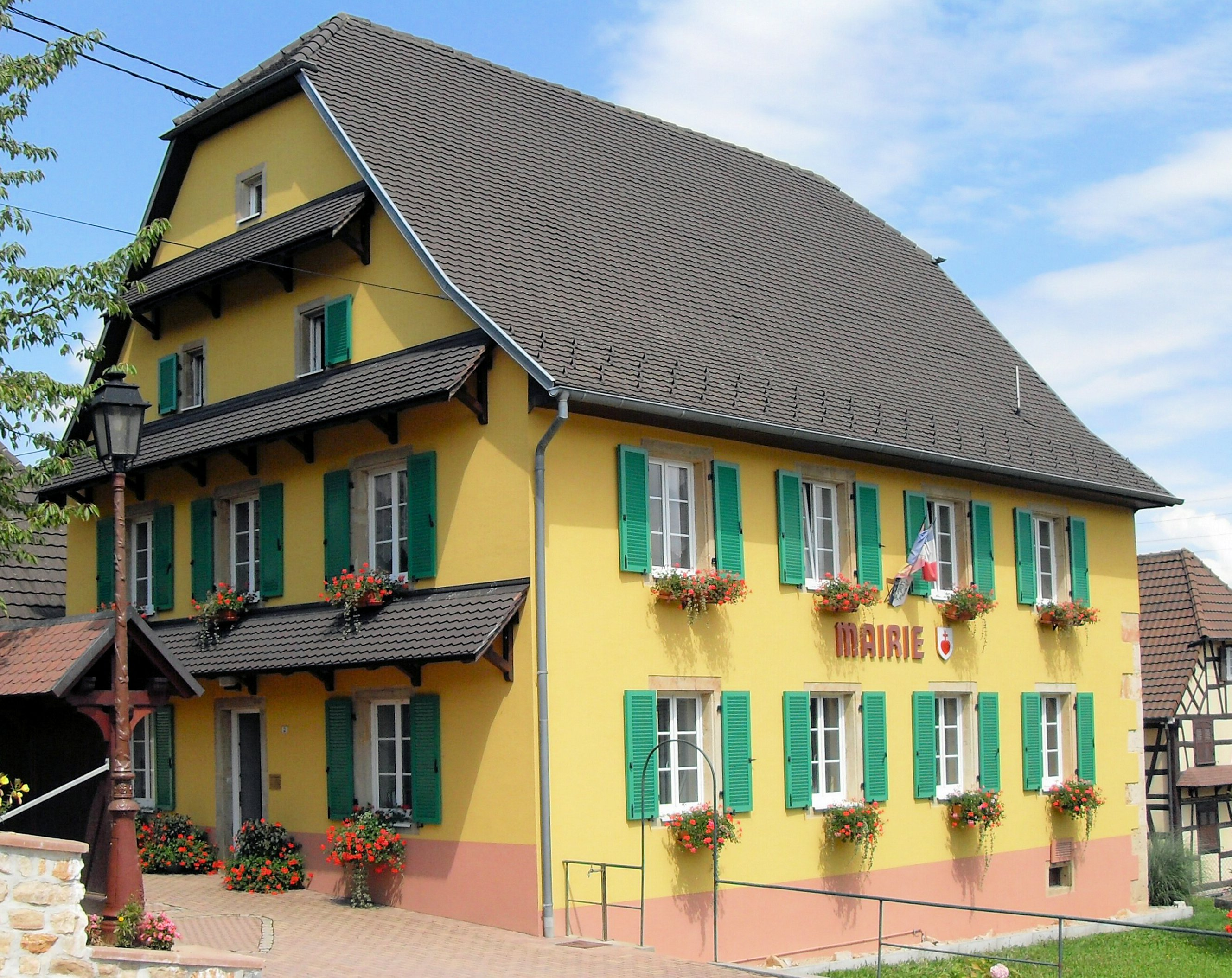
- The town hall in Riespach

- Coat of arms
- Location of Riespach
- Location within France Location within Grand Est
- Coordinates: 47°32′28″N 7°17′18″E
- Country: France
- Region: Grand Est
- Department: Haut-Rhin
- Arrondissement: Altkirch
- Canton: Altkirch
- Intercommunality: Sundgau

Government
  - Mayor (2020–2026): Aurélio Tolosa
- Area^{1}: 7.57 km^{2} (2.92 sq mi)
- Elevation: 395 m (1,296 ft)
- Highest elevation: 455 m (1,493 ft)
- Lowest elevation: 355 m (1,165 ft)
- Population (2023): 653
  - Density: 86.3/km^{2} (223/sq mi)
- Time zone: UTC+01:00 (CET)
  - Summer (DST): UTC+02:00 (CEST)
- INSEE/Postal code: 68273 /68640
- ^{1} French Land Register data, which excludes lakes, ponds, glaciers > 1 km^{2} (0.386 sq mi or 247 acres) and river estuaries.

Riespach is a commune in the Haut-Rhin department in Alsace in north-eastern France.

== See also ==
- Communes of the Haut-Rhin department
