= Heimersdorf =

Commune in Grand Est, France

- Commune
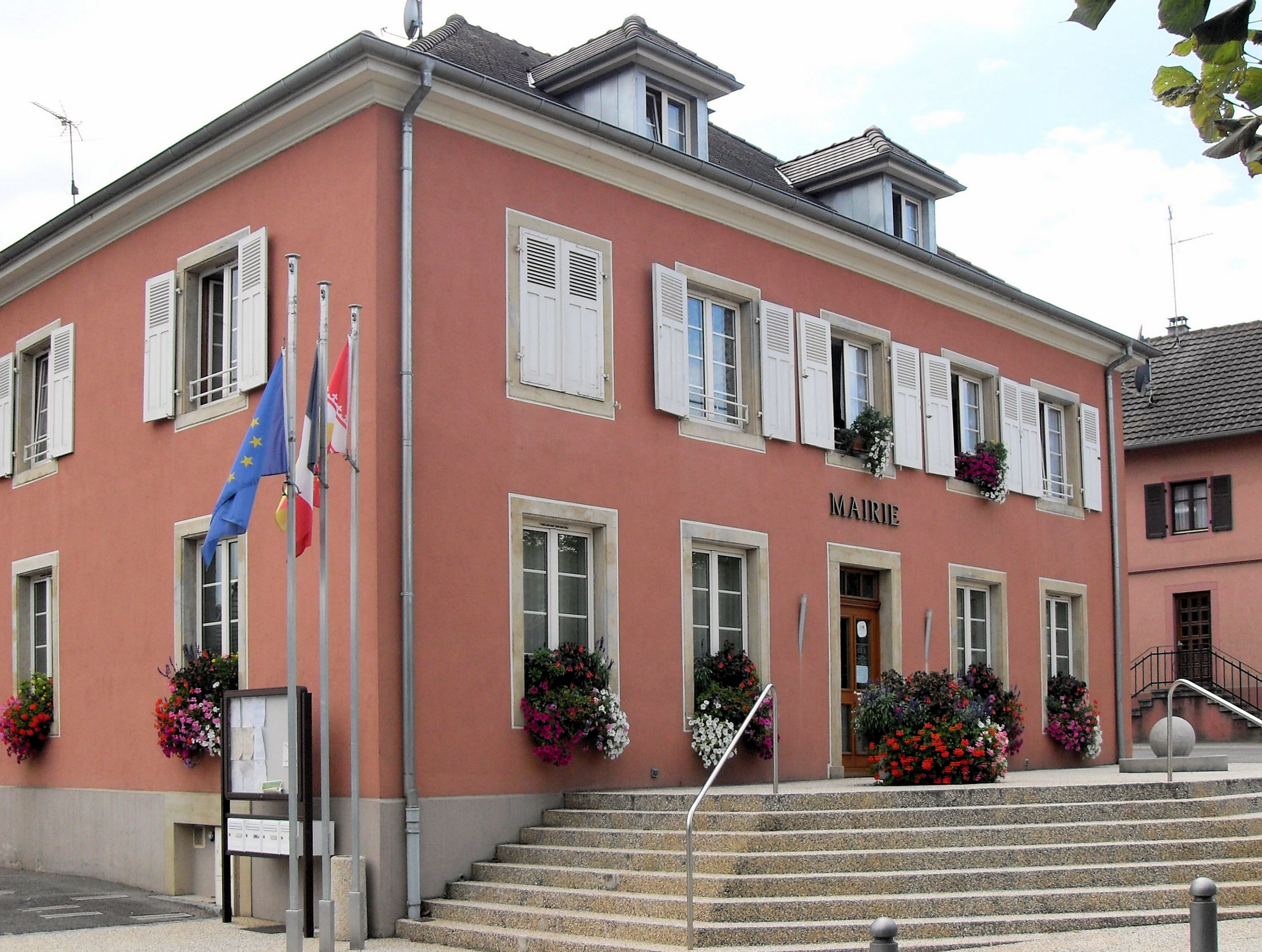
- The town hall in Heimersdorf

- Coat of arms
- Location of Heimersdorf
- Location within France Location within Grand Est
- Coordinates: 47°34′23″N 7°14′34″E
- Country: France
- Region: Grand Est
- Department: Haut-Rhin
- Arrondissement: Altkirch
- Canton: Altkirch

Government
  - Mayor (2020–2026): Michel Desserich
- Area^{1}: 7.59 km^{2} (2.93 sq mi)
- Elevation: 350 m (1,150 ft)
- Highest elevation: 416 m (1,365 ft)
- Lowest elevation: 335 m (1,099 ft)
- Population (2023): 645
  - Density: 85.0/km^{2} (220/sq mi)
- Time zone: UTC+01:00 (CET)
  - Summer (DST): UTC+02:00 (CEST)
- INSEE/Postal code: 68128 /68560
- ^{1} French Land Register data, which excludes lakes, ponds, glaciers > 1 km^{2} (0.386 sq mi or 247 acres) and river estuaries.

Heimersdorf (French pronunciation: [aiməʁsdɔʁf]) is a commune in the Haut-Rhin department in Alsace in north-eastern France.

== Population ==
Historical population
Year	Pop.	±% p.a.
1968	463	—
1975	463	+0.00%
1982	477	+0.43%
1990	573	+2.32%
1999	627	+1.01%
2007	652	+0.49%
2012	650	−0.06%
2017	660	+0.31%
2023	645	−0.38%
Source: INSEE

== See also ==
- Communes of the Haut-Rhin département
