= Canton of Altkirch =

Coordinates: 47.62°N 7.24°E

The canton of Altkirch is an administrative division of the Haut-Rhin department, northeastern France. Its borders were modified at the French canton reorganisation which came into effect in March 2015. Its seat is in Altkirch.

It consists of the following communes:

1. Altkirch
2. Aspach
3. Bendorf
4. Berentzwiller
5. Bettendorf
6. Bettlach
7. Biederthal
8. Bisel
9. Bouxwiller
10. Carspach
11. Courtavon
12. Durlinsdorf
13. Durmenach
14. Emlingen
15. Feldbach
16. Ferrette
17. Fislis
18. Franken
19. Frœningen
20. Hausgauen
21. Heidwiller
22. Heimersdorf
23. Heiwiller
24. Hirsingue
25. Hirtzbach
26. Hochstatt
27. Hundsbach
28. Illfurth
29. Illtal
30. Jettingen
31. Kiffis
32. Kœstlach
33. Levoncourt
34. Liebsdorf
35. Ligsdorf
36. Linsdorf
37. Lucelle
38. Luemschwiller
39. Lutter
40. Mœrnach
41. Muespach
42. Muespach-le-Haut
43. Oberlarg
44. Obermorschwiller
45. Oltingue
46. Raedersdorf
47. Riespach
48. Roppentzwiller
49. Ruederbach
50. Saint-Bernard
51. Schwoben
52. Sondersdorf
53. Spechbach
54. Steinsoultz
55. Tagolsheim
56. Tagsdorf
57. Vieux-Ferrette
58. Waldighofen
59. Walheim
60. Werentzhouse
61. Willer
62. Winkel
63. Wittersdorf
64. Wolschwiller
