= Willer, Haut-Rhin =

Commune in Grand Est, France

Willer
- Commune
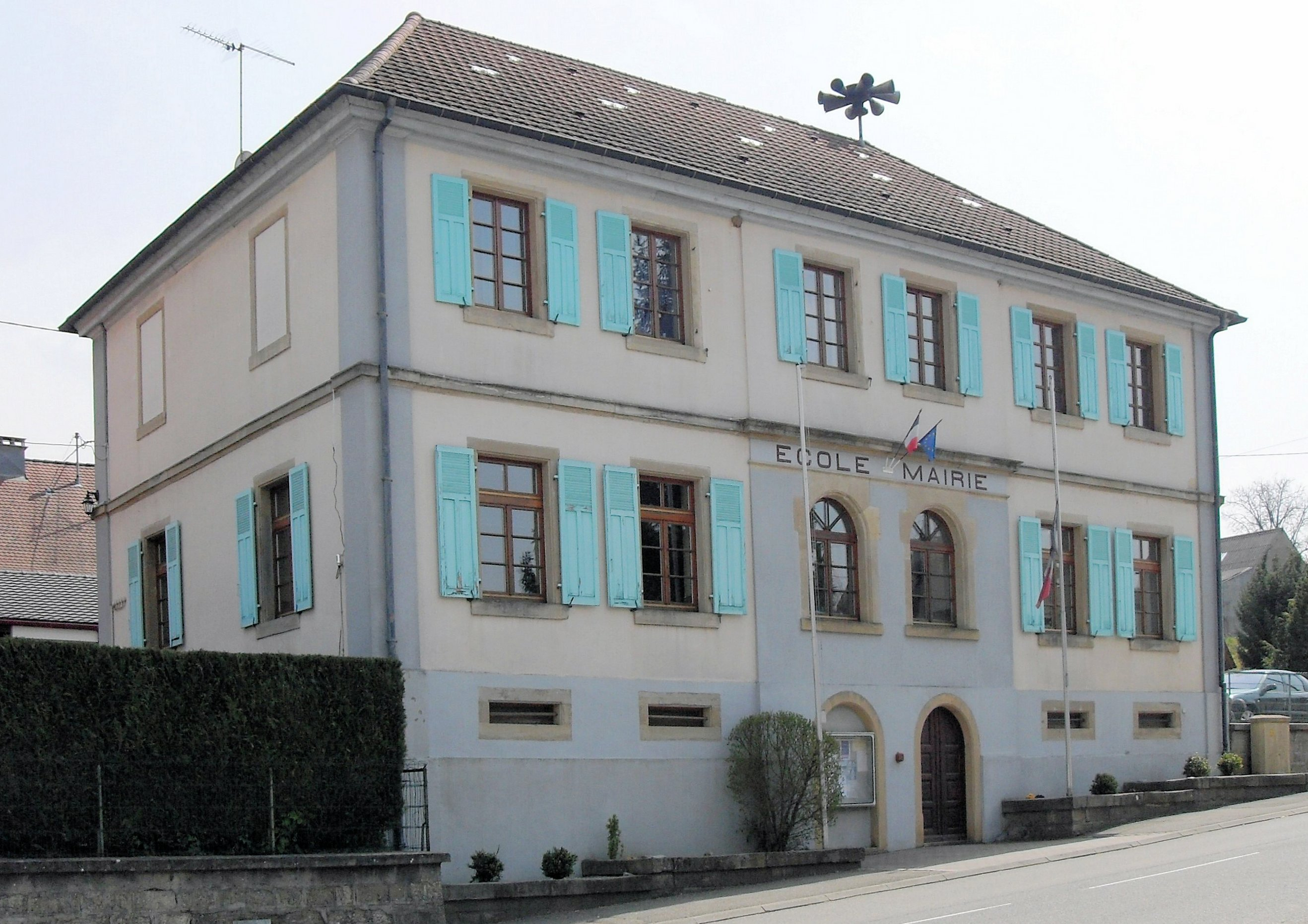
- The town hall and school in Willer

- Coat of arms
- Location of Willer
- Location within France Location within Grand Est
- Coordinates: 47°35′12″N 7°19′14″E
- Country: France
- Region: Grand Est
- Department: Haut-Rhin
- Arrondissement: Altkirch
- Canton: Altkirch
- Intercommunality: Sundgau

Government
  - Mayor (2020–2026): Rita Hell
- Area^{1}: 6.21 km^{2} (2.40 sq mi)
- Highest elevation: 438 m (1,437 ft)
- Lowest elevation: 352 m (1,155 ft)
- Population (2023): 295
  - Density: 47.5/km^{2} (123/sq mi)
- Time zone: UTC+01:00 (CET)
  - Summer (DST): UTC+02:00 (CEST)
- INSEE/Postal code: 68371 /68960
- ^{1} French Land Register data, which excludes lakes, ponds, glaciers > 1 km^{2} (0.386 sq mi or 247 acres) and river estuaries.

Willer (German: Weiler) is a commune in the Haut-Rhin department in Alsace in north-eastern France.

== Population ==
Historical population
Year	Pop.	±% p.a.
1968	362	—
1975	350	−0.48%
1982	343	−0.29%
1990	316	−1.02%
1999	303	−0.47%
2007	328	+1.00%
2012	330	+0.12%
2017	308	−1.37%
2023	295	−0.72%
Source: INSEE

== See also ==
- Communes of the Haut-Rhin department
