= Frœningen =

Commune in Grand Est, France

- Commune
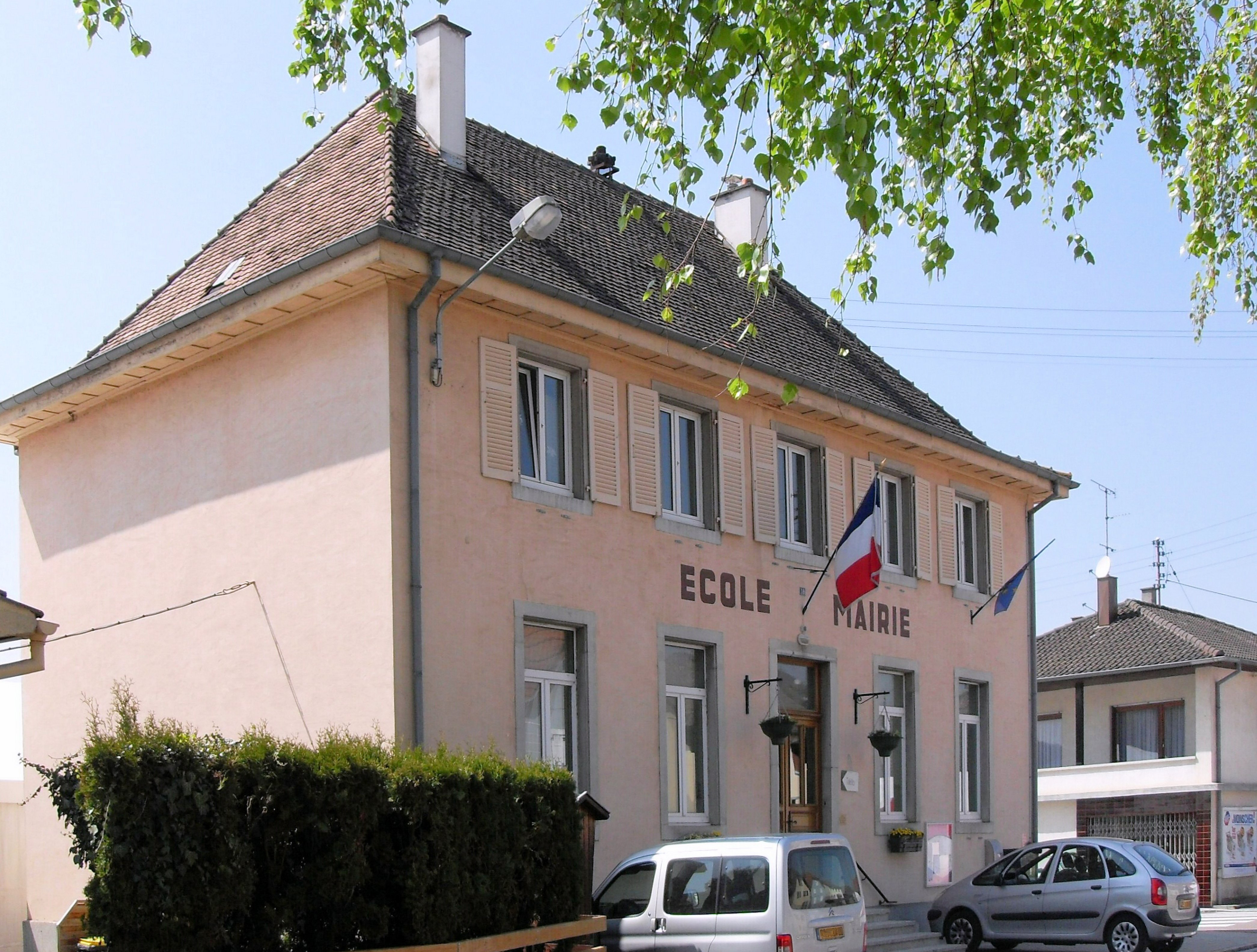
- The town hall and school in Frœningen

- Coat of arms
- Location of Frœningen
- Location within France Location within Grand Est
- Coordinates: 47°41′29″N 7°16′14″E
- Country: France
- Region: Grand Est
- Department: Haut-Rhin
- Arrondissement: Altkirch
- Canton: Altkirch

Government
  - Mayor (2020–2026): Georges Heim
- Area^{1}: 4.44 km^{2} (1.71 sq mi)
- Elevation: 260 m (850 ft)
- Highest elevation: 305 m (1,001 ft)
- Lowest elevation: 252 m (827 ft)
- Population (2023): 881
  - Density: 198/km^{2} (514/sq mi)
- Time zone: UTC+01:00 (CET)
  - Summer (DST): UTC+02:00 (CEST)
- INSEE/Postal code: 68099 /68720
- ^{1} French Land Register data, which excludes lakes, ponds, glaciers > 1 km^{2} (0.386 sq mi or 247 acres) and river estuaries.

Frœningen (French pronunciation: [frøniŋ(ɡ)ən]; German: Fröningen) is a commune in the Haut-Rhin department in Alsace in north-eastern France.

== History ==
In 1312, Count Ulrich de Ferrette yielded Frœningen to Knight Conrad of Flaxlanden. The village was later ceded to Hadmansdorf in 1458, then to the noble family of Reinach-Heidwiller in 1539. During the Thirty Years' War, the castle was spared, but was finally set on fire by the Swiss in 1468. It was rebuilt in the eighteenth century, but was burned again, following the negligence of a cook, in 1739.

The castle was rebuilt in the early nineteenth century, but fell under the bombings of the First World War in 1917.

The village had a large Jewish community at the end of the nineteenth century and bore the nickname of Little Switzerland.

== See also ==
- Communes of the Haut-Rhin département
