= Fislis =

Commune in Grand Est, France

- Commune
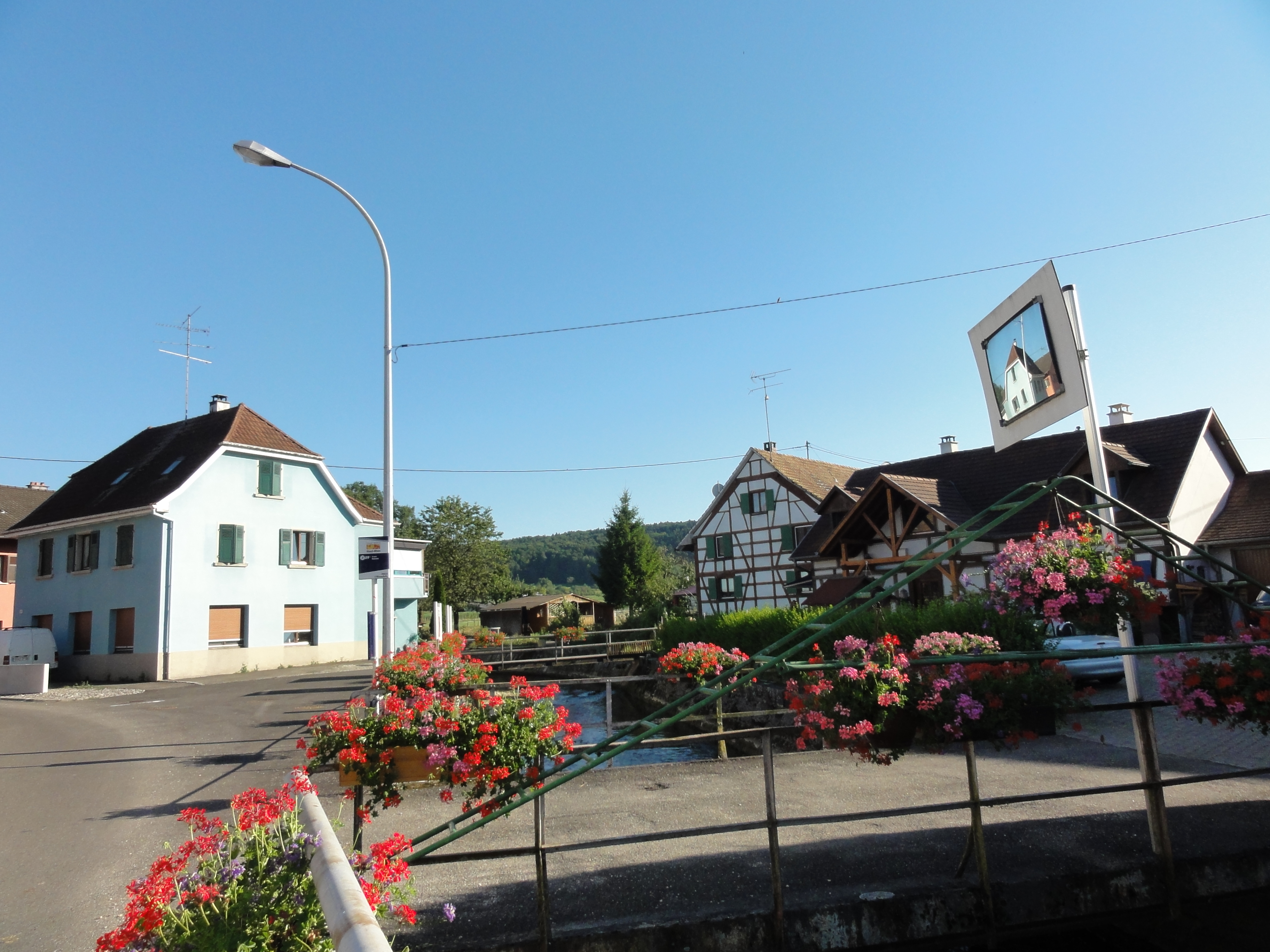
- A general view of Fislis

- Coat of arms
- Location of Fislis
- Location within France Location within Grand Est
- Coordinates: 47°30′19″N 7°22′57″E
- Country: France
- Region: Grand Est
- Department: Haut-Rhin
- Arrondissement: Altkirch
- Canton: Altkirch

Government
  - Mayor (2020–2026): Clément Libis
- Area^{1}: 7.53 km^{2} (2.91 sq mi)
- Elevation: 385 m (1,263 ft)
- Highest elevation: 532 m (1,745 ft)
- Lowest elevation: 377 m (1,237 ft)
- Population (2023): 396
  - Density: 52.6/km^{2} (136/sq mi)
- Time zone: UTC+01:00 (CET)
  - Summer (DST): UTC+02:00 (CEST)
- INSEE/Postal code: 68092 /68480
- ^{1} French Land Register data, which excludes lakes, ponds, glaciers > 1 km^{2} (0.386 sq mi or 247 acres) and river estuaries.

Fislis (French pronunciation: [fislis]) is a commune in the Haut-Rhin department in Alsace in north-eastern France.

== See also ==
- Communes of the Haut-Rhin département
