= Wittersdorf =

Commune in Grand Est, France

- Commune
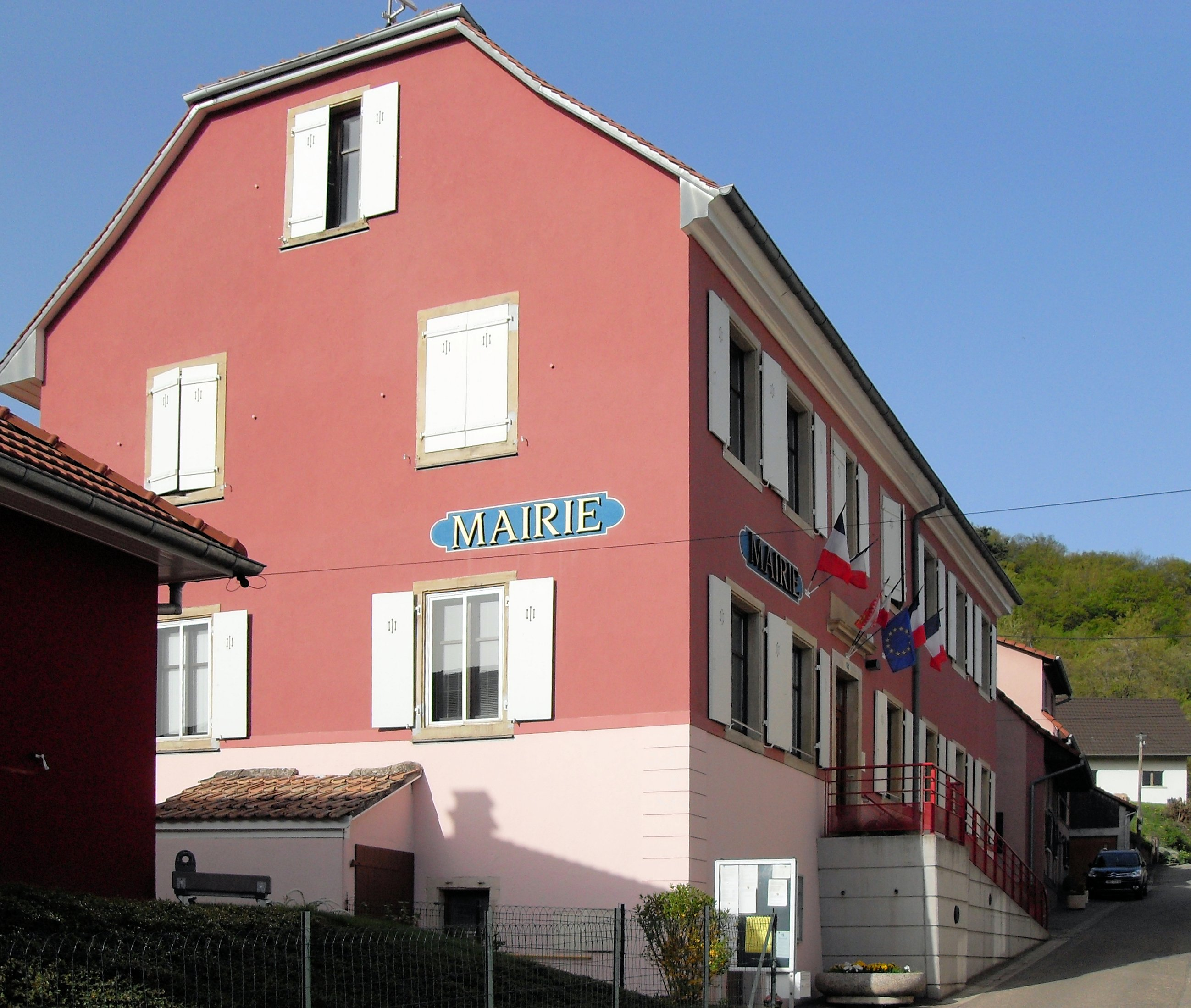
- The town hall in Wittersdorf

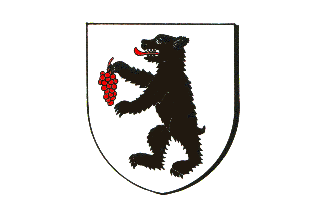
- Flag Coat of arms
- Location of Wittersdorf
- Location within France Location within Grand Est
- Coordinates: 47°37′21″N 7°16′34″E
- Country: France
- Region: Grand Est
- Department: Haut-Rhin
- Arrondissement: Altkirch
- Canton: Altkirch
- Intercommunality: Sundgau

Government
  - Mayor (2020–2026): Jean-Marie Freudenberger
- Area^{1}: 4.76 km^{2} (1.84 sq mi)
- Elevation: 287 m (942 ft)
- Highest elevation: 388 m (1,273 ft)
- Lowest elevation: 277 m (909 ft)
- Population (2023): 769
  - Density: 162/km^{2} (418/sq mi)
- Time zone: UTC+01:00 (CET)
  - Summer (DST): UTC+02:00 (CEST)
- INSEE/Postal code: 68377 /68130
- ^{1} French Land Register data, which excludes lakes, ponds, glaciers > 1 km^{2} (0.386 sq mi or 247 acres) and river estuaries.

Wittersdorf (French pronunciation: [vitəʁsdɔʁf]) is a commune in the Haut-Rhin department in Alsace in north-eastern France.

== Population ==
Historical population
Year	Pop.	±% p.a.
1968	632	—
1975	687	+1.20%
1982	673	−0.29%
1990	660	−0.24%
1999	690	+0.50%
2007	808	+1.99%
2012	836	+0.68%
2017	806	−0.73%
2023	769	−0.78%
Source: INSEE

== See also ==
- Communes of the Haut-Rhin department
