= Raedersdorf =

Commune in Grand Est, France

- Commune
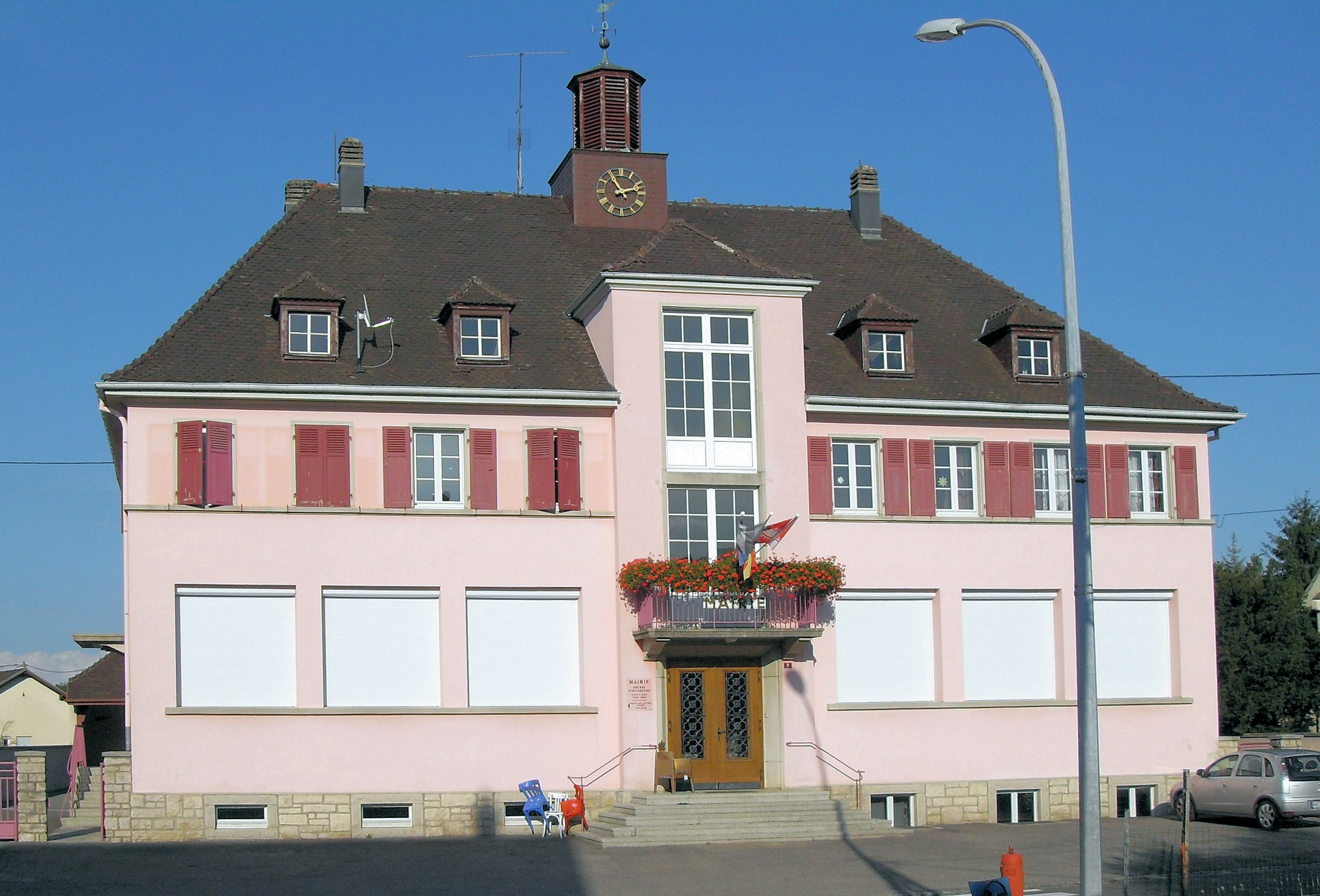
- The town hall in Raedersdorf

- Coat of arms
- Location of Raedersdorf
- Location within France Location within Grand Est
- Coordinates: 47°28′32″N 7°22′03″E
- Country: France
- Region: Grand Est
- Department: Haut-Rhin
- Arrondissement: Altkirch
- Canton: Altkirch
- Intercommunality: CC Sundgau

Government
  - Mayor (2020–2026): Jean-Marc Metz
- Area^{1}: 7.39 km^{2} (2.85 sq mi)
- Elevation: 440 m (1,440 ft)
- Highest elevation: 784 m (2,572 ft)
- Lowest elevation: 419 m (1,375 ft)
- Population (2023): 481
  - Density: 65.1/km^{2} (169/sq mi)
- Time zone: UTC+01:00 (CET)
  - Summer (DST): UTC+02:00 (CEST)
- INSEE/Postal code: 68259 /68480
- ^{1} French Land Register data, which excludes lakes, ponds, glaciers > 1 km^{2} (0.386 sq mi or 247 acres) and river estuaries.

Raedersdorf (German: Rädersdorf) is a commune in the Haut-Rhin department in Alsace in north-eastern France.

== Geography ==
Raedersdorf is located in the south of the so-called Alsatian jura, a community of communes. French-speaking Switzerland (Lucelle) and German-speaking Switzerland (Rodersdorf) are very close.

== Population ==
Historical population
| Year | Pop. | ±% p.a. |
|---|---|---|
| 1968 | 409 | — |
| 1975 | 420 | +0.38% |
| 1982 | 441 | +0.70% |
| 1990 | 491 | +1.35% |
| 1999 | 505 | +0.31% |
| 2007 | 501 | −0.10% |
| 2012 | 509 | +0.32% |
| 2017 | 513 | +0.16% |
| 2023 | 481 | −1.07% |
Source: INSEE

== See also ==
- Communes of the Haut-Rhin department
