= Muespach-le-Haut =

Commune in Grand Est, France

- Commune
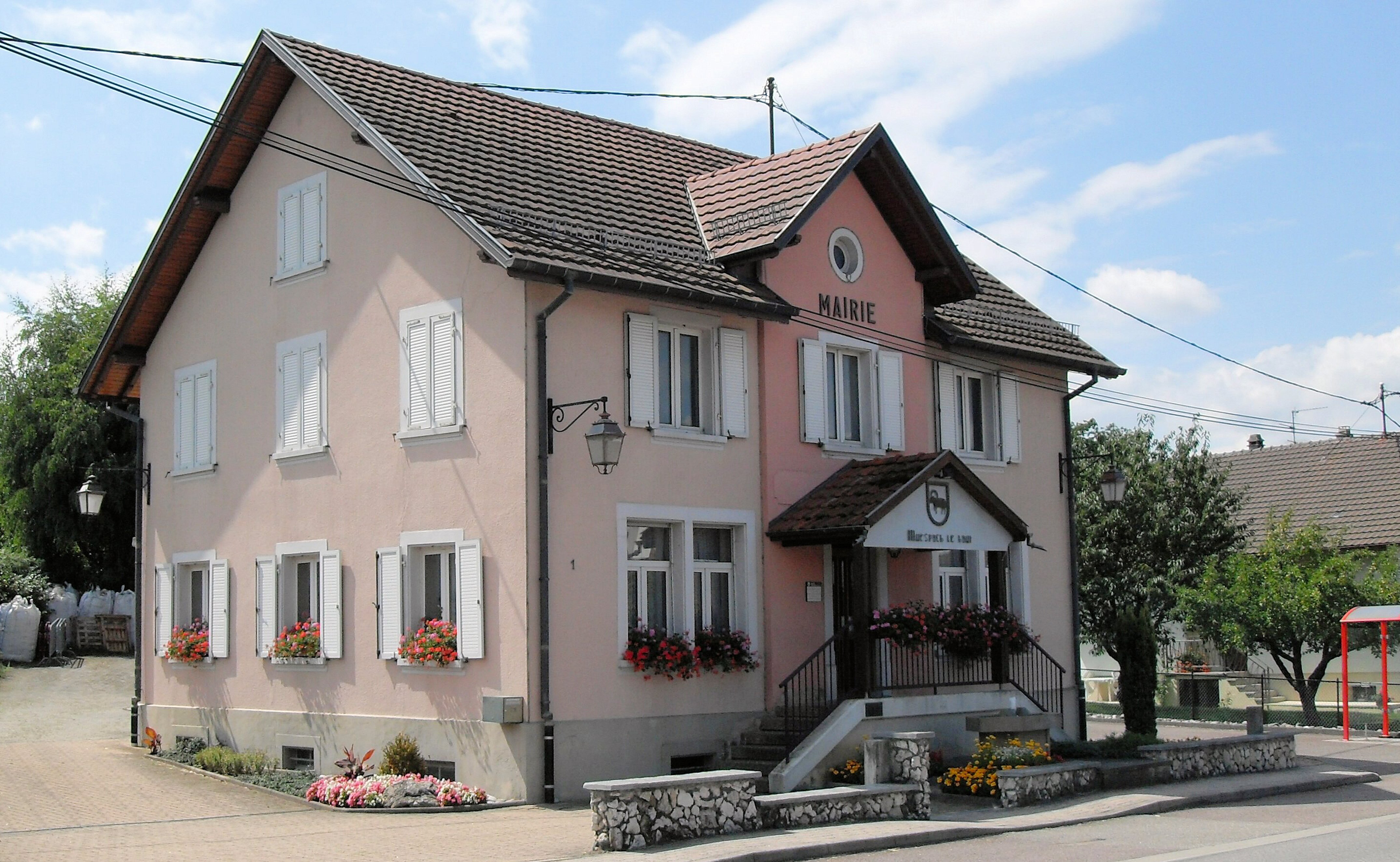
- The town hall in Muespach-le-Haut

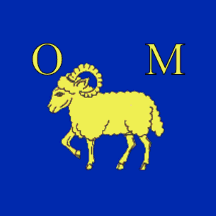
- Flag Coat of arms
- Location of Muespach-le-Haut
- Location within France Location within Grand Est
- Coordinates: 47°32′45″N 7°24′14″E
- Country: France
- Region: Grand Est
- Department: Haut-Rhin
- Arrondissement: Altkirch
- Canton: Altkirch

Government
  - Mayor (2020–2026): Fernand Wieder
- Area^{1}: 6.91 km^{2} (2.67 sq mi)
- Elevation: 445 m (1,460 ft)
- Highest elevation: 493 m (1,617 ft)
- Lowest elevation: 410 m (1,350 ft)
- Population (2023): 1,178
  - Density: 170/km^{2} (442/sq mi)
- Time zone: UTC+01:00 (CET)
  - Summer (DST): UTC+02:00 (CEST)
- INSEE/Postal code: 68222 /68640
- ^{1} French Land Register data, which excludes lakes, ponds, glaciers > 1 km^{2} (0.386 sq mi or 247 acres) and river estuaries.

Muespach-le-Haut (German: Obermüspach) is a commune in the Haut-Rhin department in Alsace in north-eastern France.

== See also ==
- Communes of the Haut-Rhin département
