= Ruederbach =

Commune in Grand Est, France

- Commune
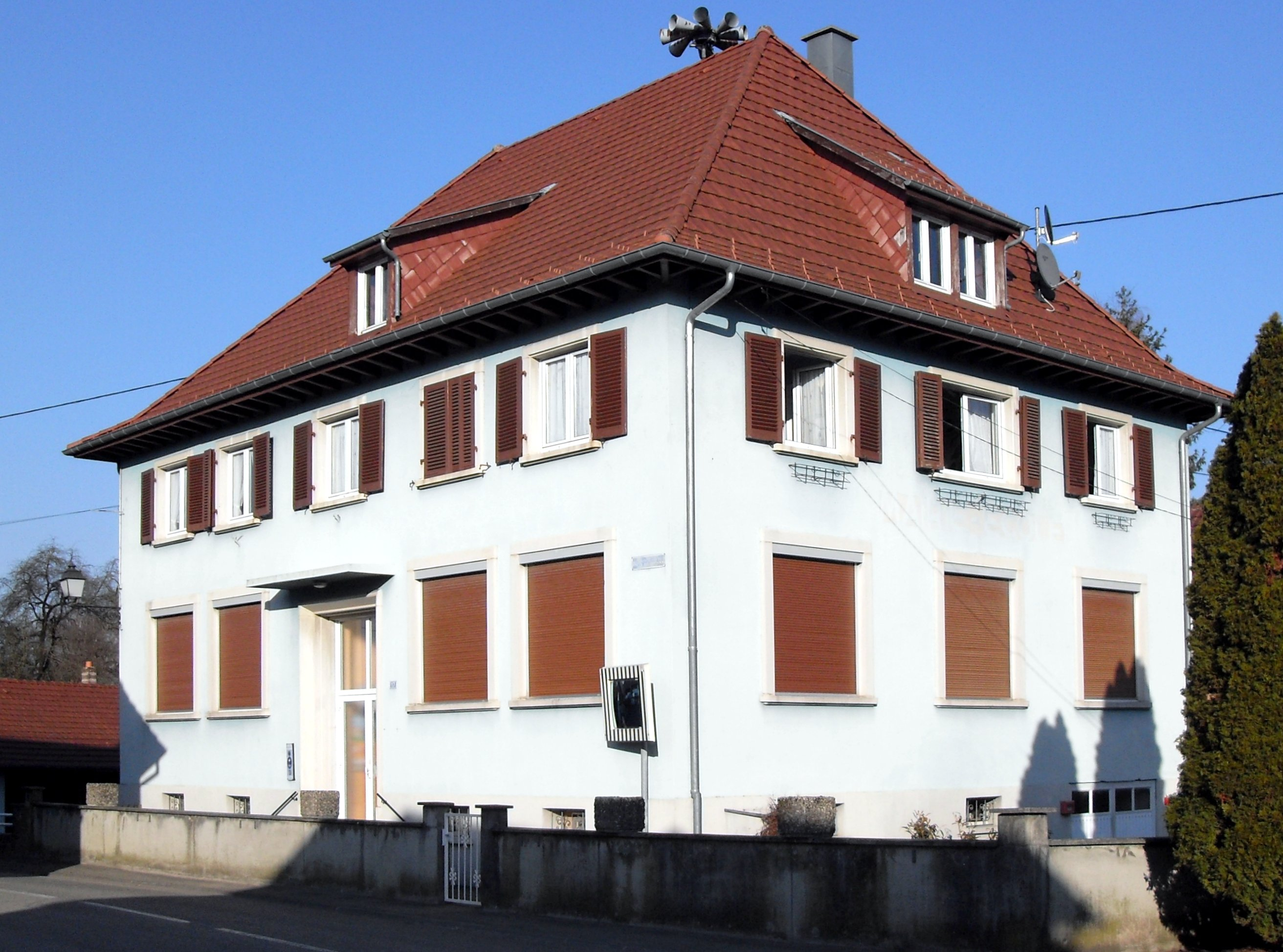
- The town hall in Ruederbach

- Coat of arms
- Location of Ruederbach
- Location within France Location within Grand Est
- Coordinates: 47°33′50″N 7°16′13″E
- Country: France
- Region: Grand Est
- Department: Haut-Rhin
- Arrondissement: Altkirch
- Canton: Altkirch

Government
  - Mayor (2020–2026): Jean-Pierre Buisson
- Area^{1}: 4.46 km^{2} (1.72 sq mi)
- Elevation: 380 m (1,250 ft)
- Highest elevation: 424 m (1,391 ft)
- Lowest elevation: 335 m (1,099 ft)
- Population (2023): 385
  - Density: 86.3/km^{2} (224/sq mi)
- Time zone: UTC+01:00 (CET)
  - Summer (DST): UTC+02:00 (CEST)
- INSEE/Postal code: 68288 /68560
- ^{1} French Land Register data, which excludes lakes, ponds, glaciers > 1 km^{2} (0.386 sq mi or 247 acres) and river estuaries.

Ruederbach (German: Rüderbach) is a commune in the Haut-Rhin department in Alsace in north-eastern France.

== See also ==
- Communes of the Haut-Rhin department
