= Heidwiller =

Commune in Grand Est, France

- Commune
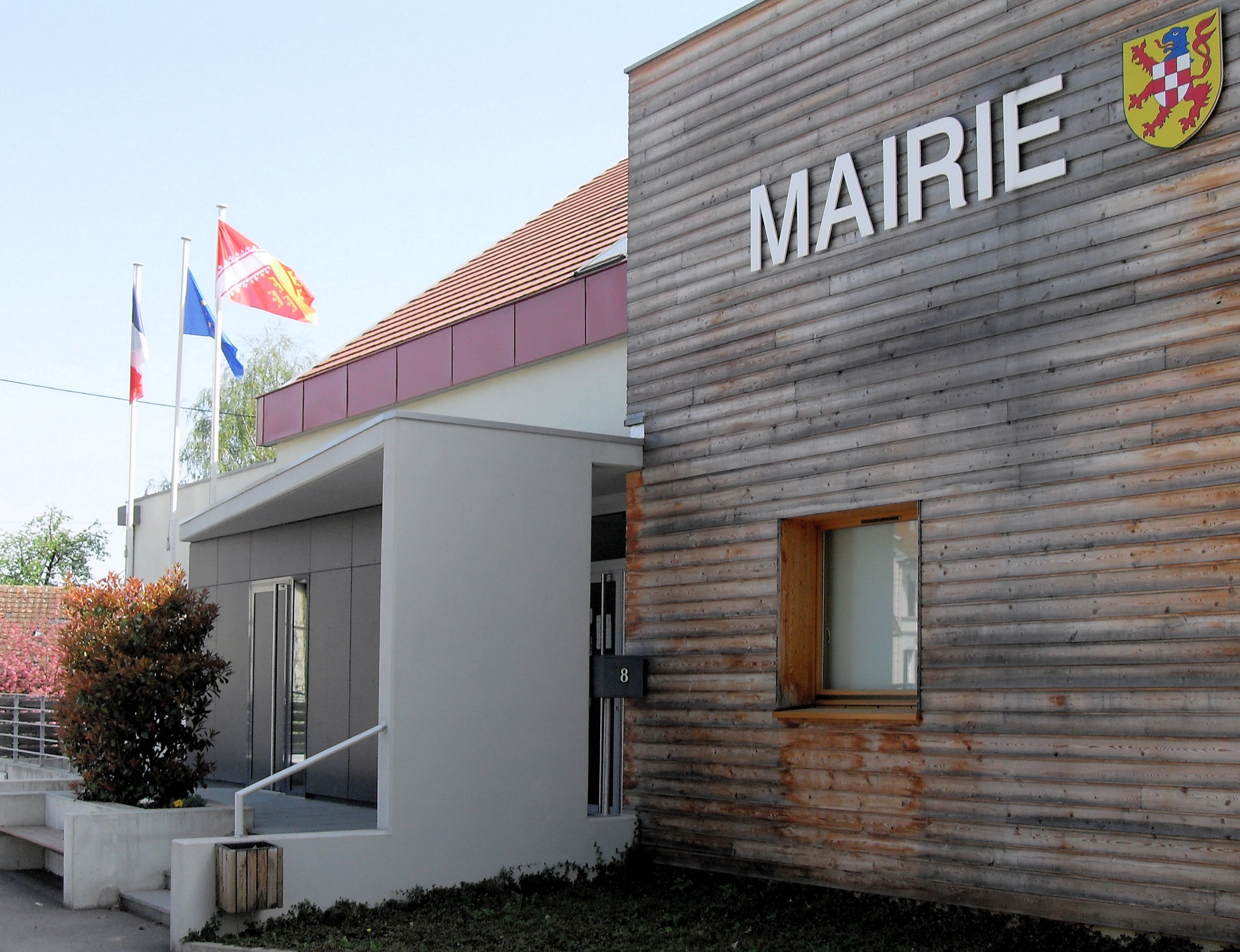
- The town hall in Heidwiller

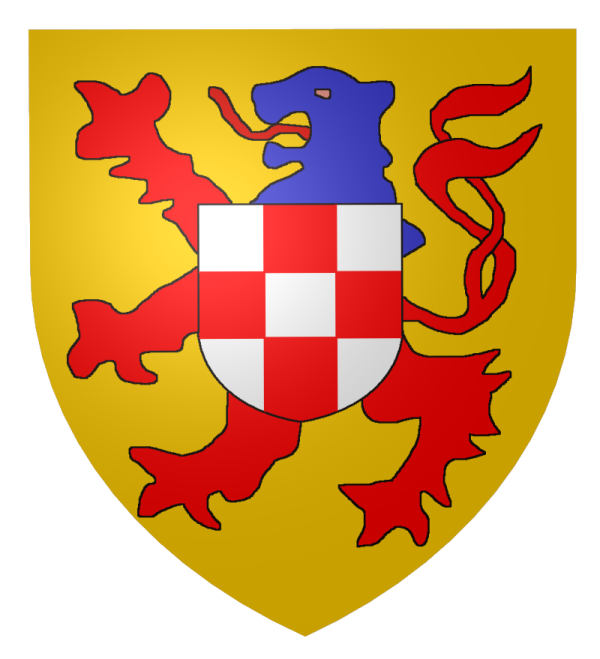
- Coat of arms
- Location of Heidwiller
- Location within France Location within Grand Est
- Coordinates: 47°39′42″N 7°14′41″E
- Country: France
- Region: Grand Est
- Department: Haut-Rhin
- Arrondissement: Altkirch
- Canton: Altkirch

Government
  - Mayor (2020–2026): Gilles Fremiot
- Area^{1}: 4.48 km^{2} (1.73 sq mi)
- Elevation: 280 m (920 ft)
- Highest elevation: 360 m (1,180 ft)
- Lowest elevation: 259 m (850 ft)
- Population (2023): 641
  - Density: 143/km^{2} (371/sq mi)
- Time zone: UTC+01:00 (CET)
  - Summer (DST): UTC+02:00 (CEST)
- INSEE/Postal code: 68127 /68720
- ^{1} French Land Register data, which excludes lakes, ponds, glaciers > 1 km^{2} (0.386 sq mi or 247 acres) and river estuaries.

Heidwiller (French pronunciation: [aidvilɛʁ]; German: Heidweiler) is a commune in the Haut-Rhin department in Alsace in north-eastern France.

== See also ==
- Communes of the Haut-Rhin département
