= Walter Ewers =

- Born: 11 May 1892; Lübeck, Germany
- Died: 15 May 1918 (aged 26); Villers-Bretonneux, France
- Military career
- Allegiance: German Empire
- Branch: Artillery; aviation
- Rank: Oberleutnant
- Units: Flieger-Abteilung 26; Jagdstaffel 8; Jagdstaffel 12;
- Commands: Jagdstaffel 77
- Awards: Knight's Cross of the Royal House Order of Hohenzollern; Military Merit Order; Iron Cross First and Second Class

Oberleutnant Walter Ewers (11 May 1892 – 15 May 1918) was a World War I flying ace credited with eight aerial victories.

== Early life ==
Walter Ewers was born in Lübeck, Germany on 11 May 1892.

== World War I ==
Ewers began military service as an artilleryman in Bavaria's Field Artillery Regiment Number 7. At some point, he transferred to the Luftstreitkräfte. After aviation training, he was assigned to Flieger-Abteilung 26 to serve in two-seaters. He was upgraded to piloting a fighter plane, transferring to Jasta 8. After a further transfer to Jasta 12 in 1917, he scored his first three aerial successes against the Royal Flying Corps, downing a couple of Airco DH.5s from No. 41 Squadron RFC and a Sopwith Pup from No. 46 Squadron RFC. The latter was part of a large offensive patrol of mixed British aircraft escorting 46 Squadron's DH.5s.

He was chosen to command Bavarian Jagdstaffel 77 as Staffelführer on 21 January 1918. He had been commissioned a leutnant on 22 May 1917; he was further promoted, to oberleutnant, on 15 March 1918. As pilot or as commander, he continued to score victories; in the first three months of 1918, at least three out of five of his victims were French. Ewers was honored with both classes of the Iron Cross, his native Bavaria's Military Merit Order, and the Royal House Order of Hohenzollern for his exploits.

At 0930 hours on 15 May 1918, Oberleutnant Walter Ewers was killed in action while piloting his Albatros D.V in combat over Villers-Bretonneux with No. 65 Squadron RAF. He was buried in a mass grave.

== List of aerial victories ==
See also Aerial victory standards of World War I

Confirmed victories are numbered and listed chronologically. Unconfirmed victories are denoted by "u/c" and may or may not be listed by date.

No.	Date/time	Foe	Result	Location	Notes
1	18 September 1917 @ 1120 hours	British Airco DH.5	Destroyed	Wambaix, France	Victim from No. 41 Squadron RFC
2	10 October 1917 @ 1705 hours	British Airco DH.5	Destroyed	Hendicourt	Victim from No. 41 Squadron RFC
3	11 October 1917 @ 1745 hours	British Sopwith Pup	Destroyed	East of Sains-lès-Marquion, France	Victim from No. 46 Squadron RFC
4	5 January 1918	French Dorand AR.2 or Paul Schmitt	Destroyed	Saint Liggert	
5	5 January 1918	Spad	Destroyed	Southwest of Retzwiller, France	
6	23 February 1918 @ 1620 hours	French Spad	Destroyed	Oberburnhaupt	Victim from Escadrille 49
7	12 March 1918	Spad	Destroyed	Belfort, France	
8	18 March 1918 @ 1629 hours	French Dorand AR.2 or Paul Schmitt	Destroyed	Ballersdorf, France	
