= Feldbach =

Feldbach is the name of several places:

- Feldbach, Switzerland, a village near Rapperswil, Switzerland
- Feldbach, Haut-Rhin, a commune in the Haut-Rhin département, France
- Feldbach, Styria, a city in Austria
