= Bettlach =

Bettlach may refer to:

- Bettlach, Switzerland
- Bettlach, Haut-Rhin, in Alsace, France
