= Ligsdorf =

Commune in Grand Est, France

- Commune
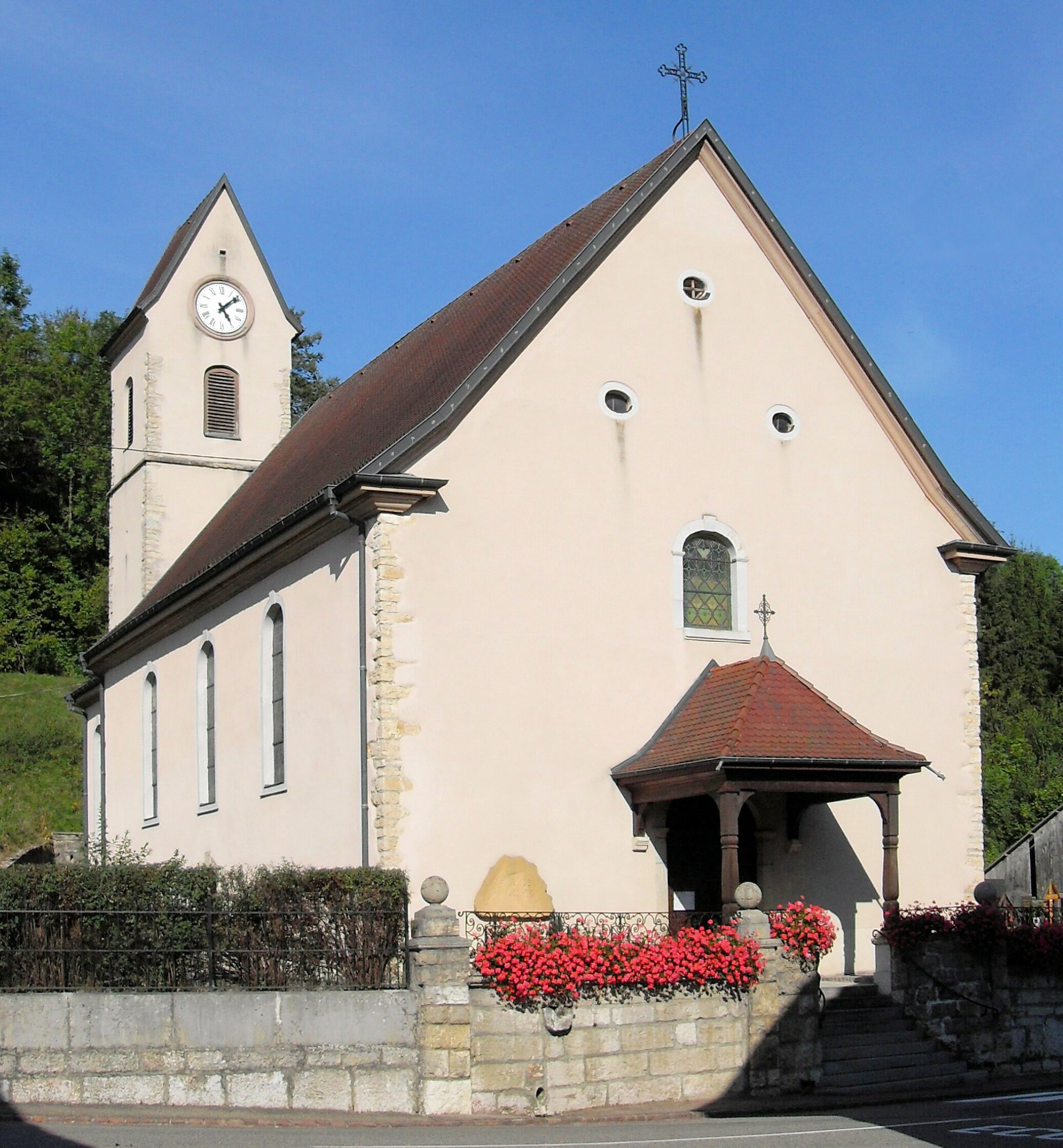
- The church in Ligsdorf

- Coat of arms
- Location of Ligsdorf
- Location within France Location within Grand Est
- Coordinates: 47°28′24″N 7°18′21″E
- Country: France
- Region: Grand Est
- Department: Haut-Rhin
- Arrondissement: Altkirch
- Canton: Altkirch
- Intercommunality: Sundgau

Government
  - Mayor (2020–2026): Doris Brugger
- Area^{1}: 10.03 km^{2} (3.87 sq mi)
- Elevation: 490 m (1,610 ft)
- Highest elevation: 810 m (2,660 ft)
- Lowest elevation: 468 m (1,535 ft)
- Population (2023): 317
  - Density: 31.6/km^{2} (81.9/sq mi)
- Time zone: UTC+01:00 (CET)
  - Summer (DST): UTC+02:00 (CEST)
- INSEE/Postal code: 68186 /68480
- ^{1} French Land Register data, which excludes lakes, ponds, glaciers > 1 km^{2} (0.386 sq mi or 247 acres) and river estuaries.

Ligsdorf is a commune in the Haut-Rhin department in Alsace in north-eastern France.

== Population ==
Historical population
Year	Pop.	±% p.a.
1968	270	—
1975	236	−1.90%
1982	276	+2.26%
1990	313	+1.58%
1999	297	−0.58%
2007	342	+1.78%
2012	321	−1.26%
2017	311	−0.63%
2023	317	+0.32%
Source: INSEE

== See also ==
- Communes of the Haut-Rhin département
