= Tagsdorf =

Commune in Grand Est, France

- Commune
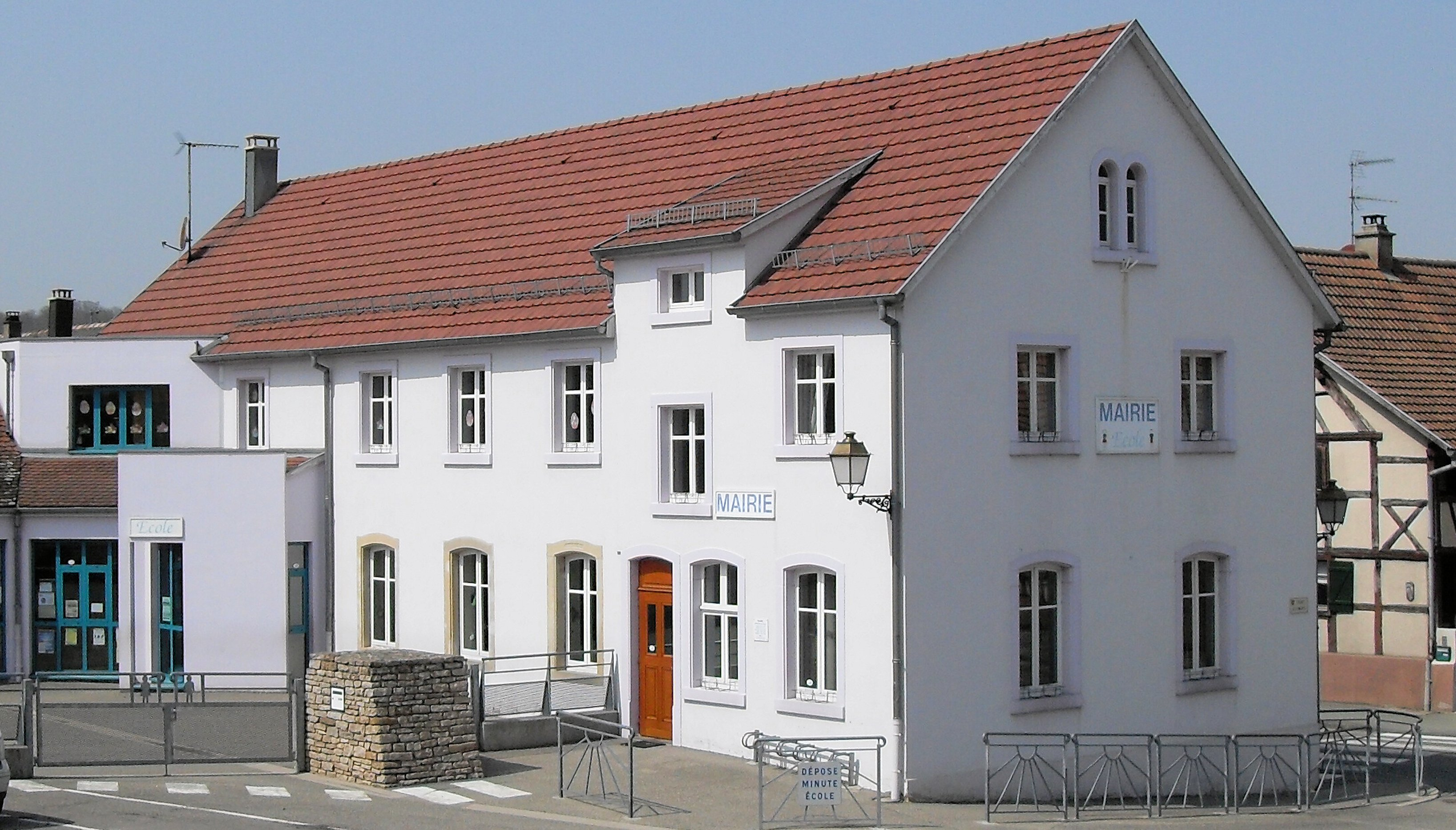
- The town hall in Tagsdorf

- Coat of arms
- Location of Tagsdorf
- Location within France Location within Grand Est
- Coordinates: 47°37′20″N 7°18′08″E
- Country: France
- Region: Grand Est
- Department: Haut-Rhin
- Arrondissement: Altkirch
- Canton: Altkirch
- Intercommunality: Sundgau

Government
  - Mayor (2020–2026): Madeleine Goetz
- Area^{1}: 2.5 km^{2} (0.97 sq mi)
- Elevation: 300 m (980 ft)
- Highest elevation: 388 m (1,273 ft)
- Lowest elevation: 291 m (955 ft)
- Population (2023): 325
  - Density: 130/km^{2} (340/sq mi)
- Time zone: UTC+01:00 (CET)
  - Summer (DST): UTC+02:00 (CEST)
- INSEE/Postal code: 68333 /68130
- ^{1} French Land Register data, which excludes lakes, ponds, glaciers > 1 km^{2} (0.386 sq mi or 247 acres) and river estuaries.

Tagsdorf (French pronunciation: [taɡzdɔʁf]) is a commune in the Haut-Rhin department in Alsace in north-eastern France.

== Population ==
Historical population
Year	Pop.	±% p.a.
1968	211	—
1975	201	−0.69%
1982	202	+0.07%
1990	262	+3.30%
1999	312	+1.96%
2007	325	+0.51%
2012	307	−1.13%
2017	294	−0.86%
2023	325	+1.68%
Source: INSEE

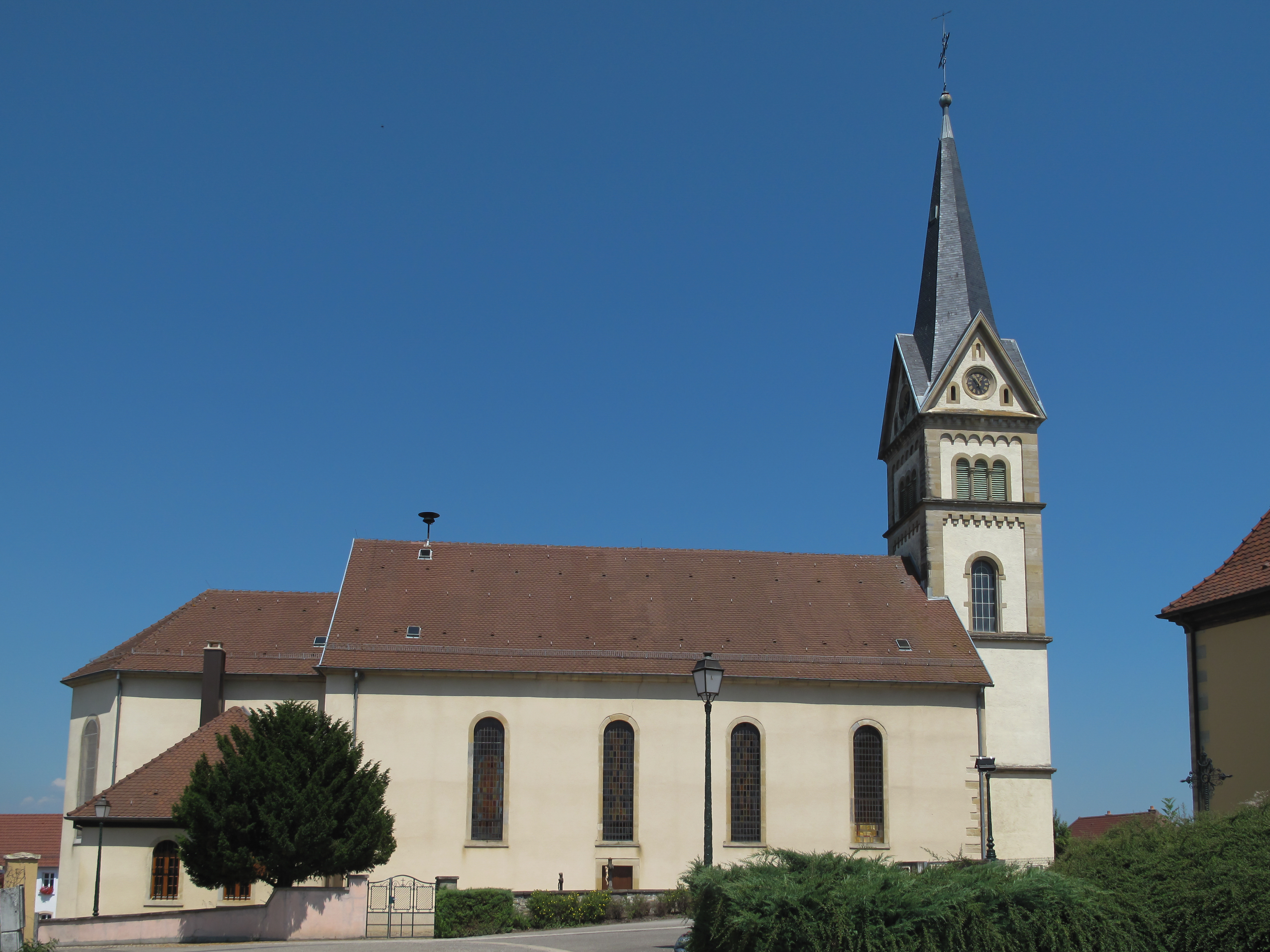
Church: l'église Saint-Blaise

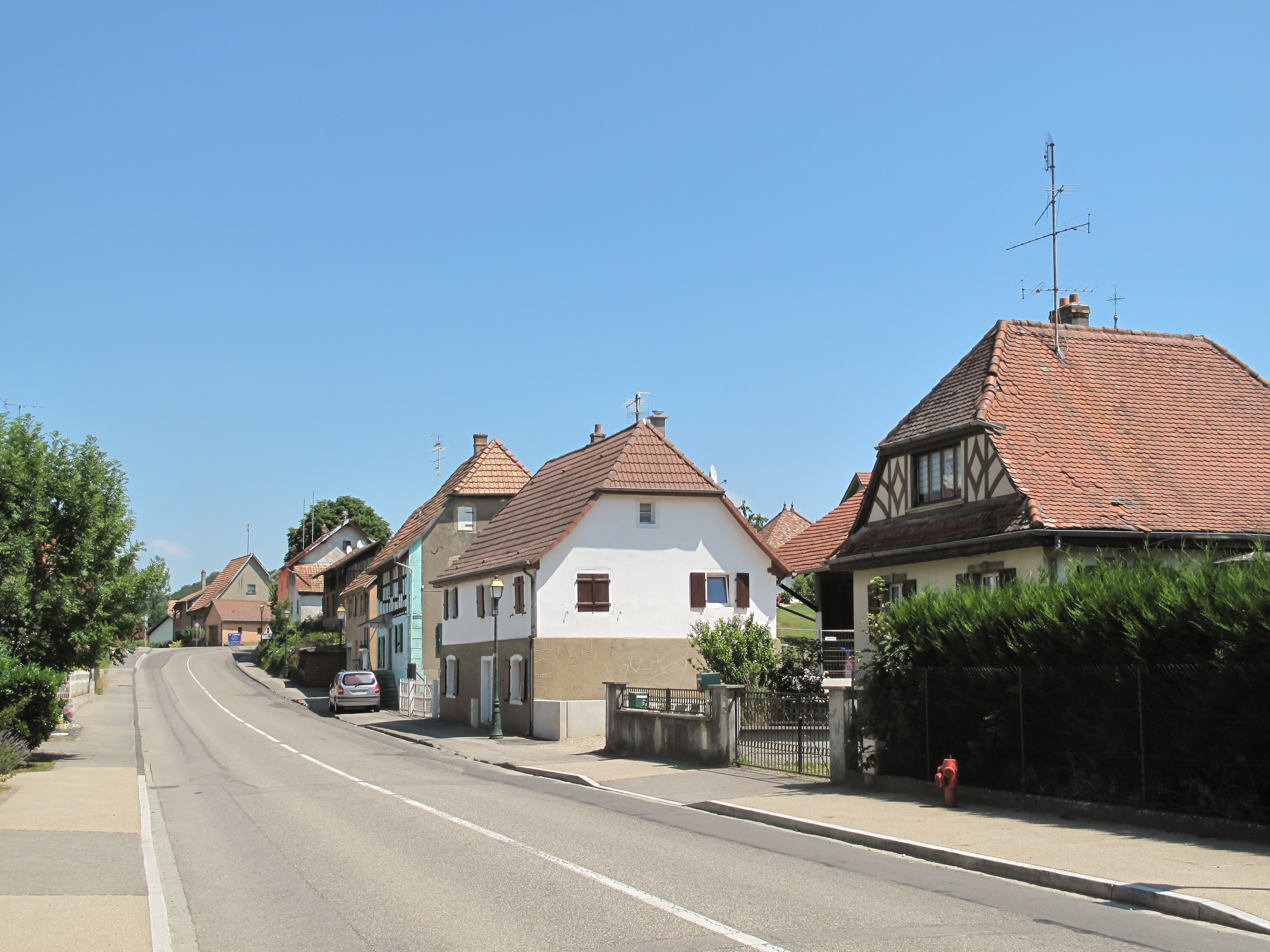
View to a street

== See also ==
- Communes of the Haut-Rhin department
