= Saint-Bernard, Haut-Rhin =

Commune in Grand Est, France

Saint-Bernard
- Commune
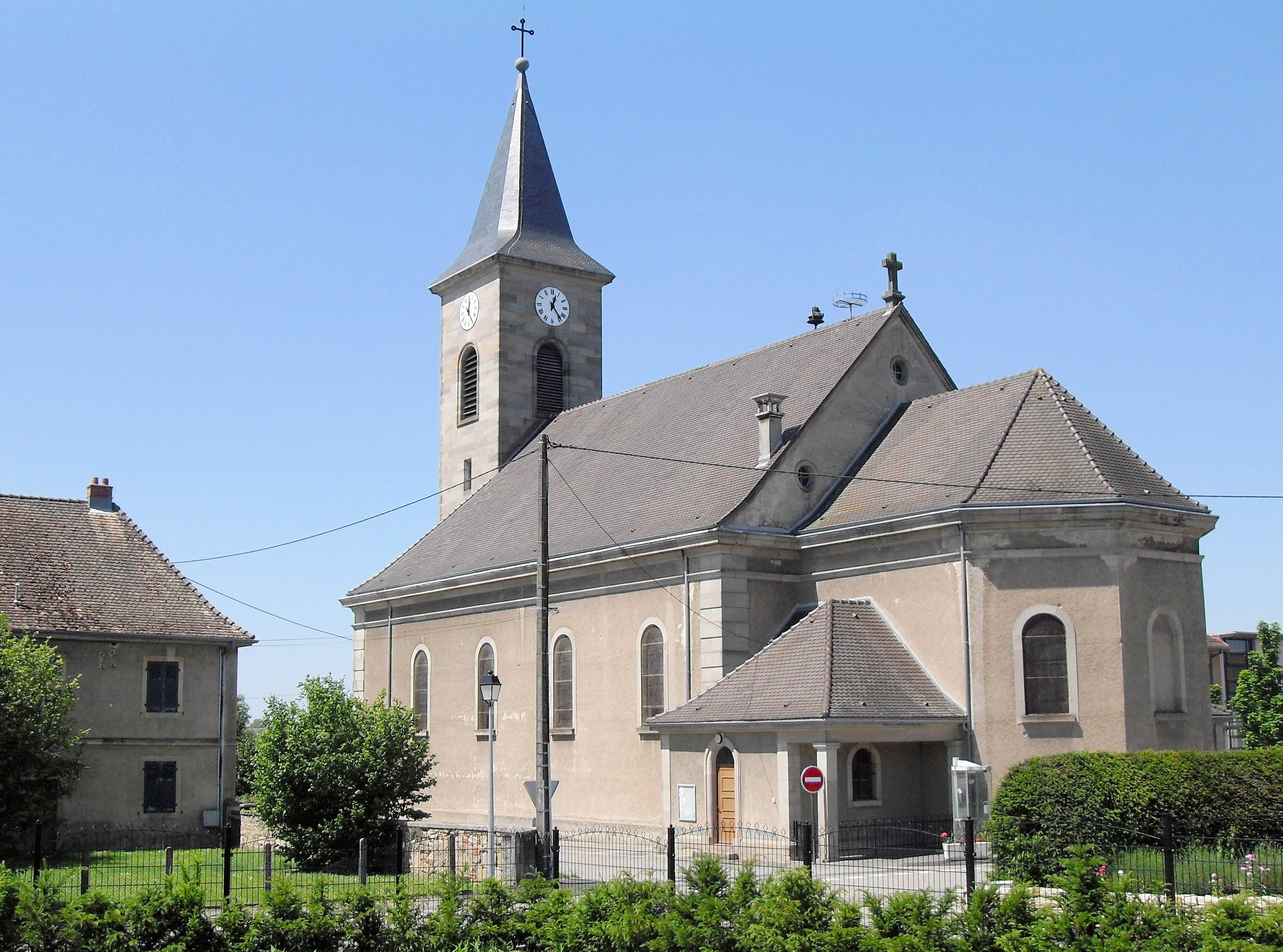
- The church in Saint-Bernard

- Coat of arms
- Location of Saint-Bernard
- Location within France Location within Grand Est
- Coordinates: 47°40′19″N 7°12′09″E
- Country: France
- Region: Grand Est
- Department: Haut-Rhin
- Arrondissement: Altkirch
- Canton: Altkirch

Government
  - Mayor (2020–2026): Bertrand Ivain
- Area^{1}: 6.04 km^{2} (2.33 sq mi)
- Elevation: 275 m (902 ft)
- Highest elevation: 344 m (1,129 ft)
- Lowest elevation: 264 m (866 ft)
- Population (2023): 607
  - Density: 100/km^{2} (260/sq mi)
- Time zone: UTC+01:00 (CET)
  - Summer (DST): UTC+02:00 (CEST)
- INSEE/Postal code: 68081 /68720
- ^{1} French Land Register data, which excludes lakes, ponds, glaciers > 1 km^{2} (0.386 sq mi or 247 acres) and river estuaries.

Saint-Bernard (French pronunciation: [sɛ̃ bɛʁnaʁ]; German: Sankt Bernhard; Alsatian: Sànkt Bernhàrd) is a commune in the Haut-Rhin department in Alsace in north-eastern France.

The commune was created on 1 August 1972 through the merger of the municipalities of Brinighoffen (German: Brünighofen) and Enschingen.

The Rhône–Rhine Canal runs through the village, to the south of the centre, as do the rivers Largue and Allmendgraben.

== See also ==
- Communes of the Haut-Rhin department
