= Valdieu-Lutran =

Commune in Grand Est, France

- Commune
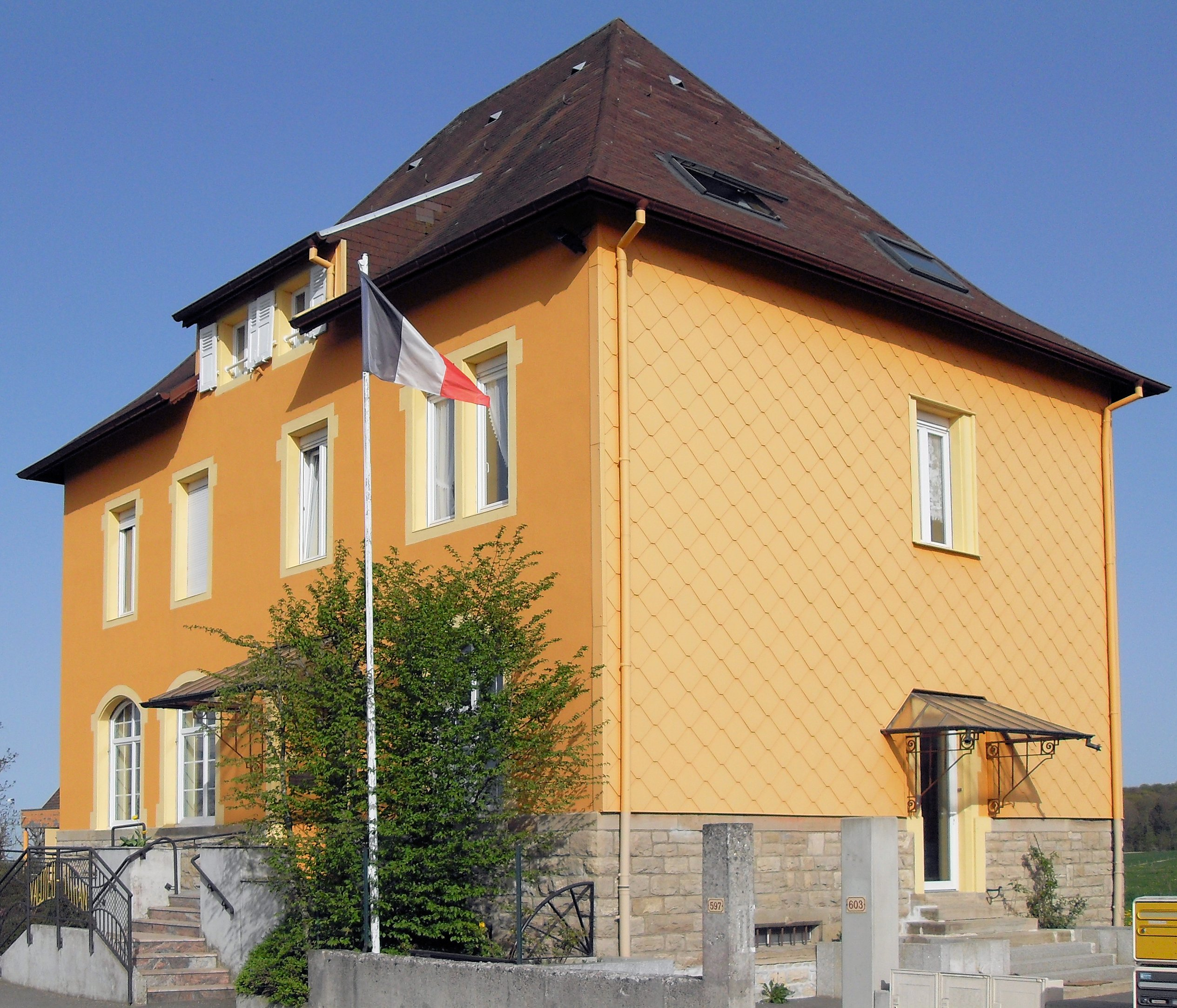
- The town hall in Valdieu-Lutran

- Coat of arms
- Location of Valdieu-Lutran
- Location within France Location within Grand Est
- Coordinates: 47°37′39″N 7°03′33″E
- Country: France
- Region: Grand Est
- Department: Haut-Rhin
- Arrondissement: Altkirch
- Canton: Masevaux-Niederbruck

Government
  - Mayor (2020–2026): Florent Lachaussée
- Area^{1}: 5.17 km^{2} (2.00 sq mi)
- Elevation: 340 m (1,120 ft)
- Highest elevation: 386 m (1,266 ft)
- Lowest elevation: 321 m (1,053 ft)
- Population (2023): 421
  - Density: 81.4/km^{2} (211/sq mi)
- Time zone: UTC+01:00 (CET)
  - Summer (DST): UTC+02:00 (CEST)
- INSEE/Postal code: 68192 /68210
- ^{1} French Land Register data, which excludes lakes, ponds, glaciers > 1 km^{2} (0.386 sq mi or 247 acres) and river estuaries.

Valdieu-Lutran (French pronunciation: [valdjø lytʁɑ̃]; German: Gottesthal-Luttern) is a commune in the Haut-Rhin department in Alsace in north-eastern France.

== See also ==
- Communes of the Haut-Rhin department
