= Wolschwiller =

Commune in Grand Est, France

- Commune
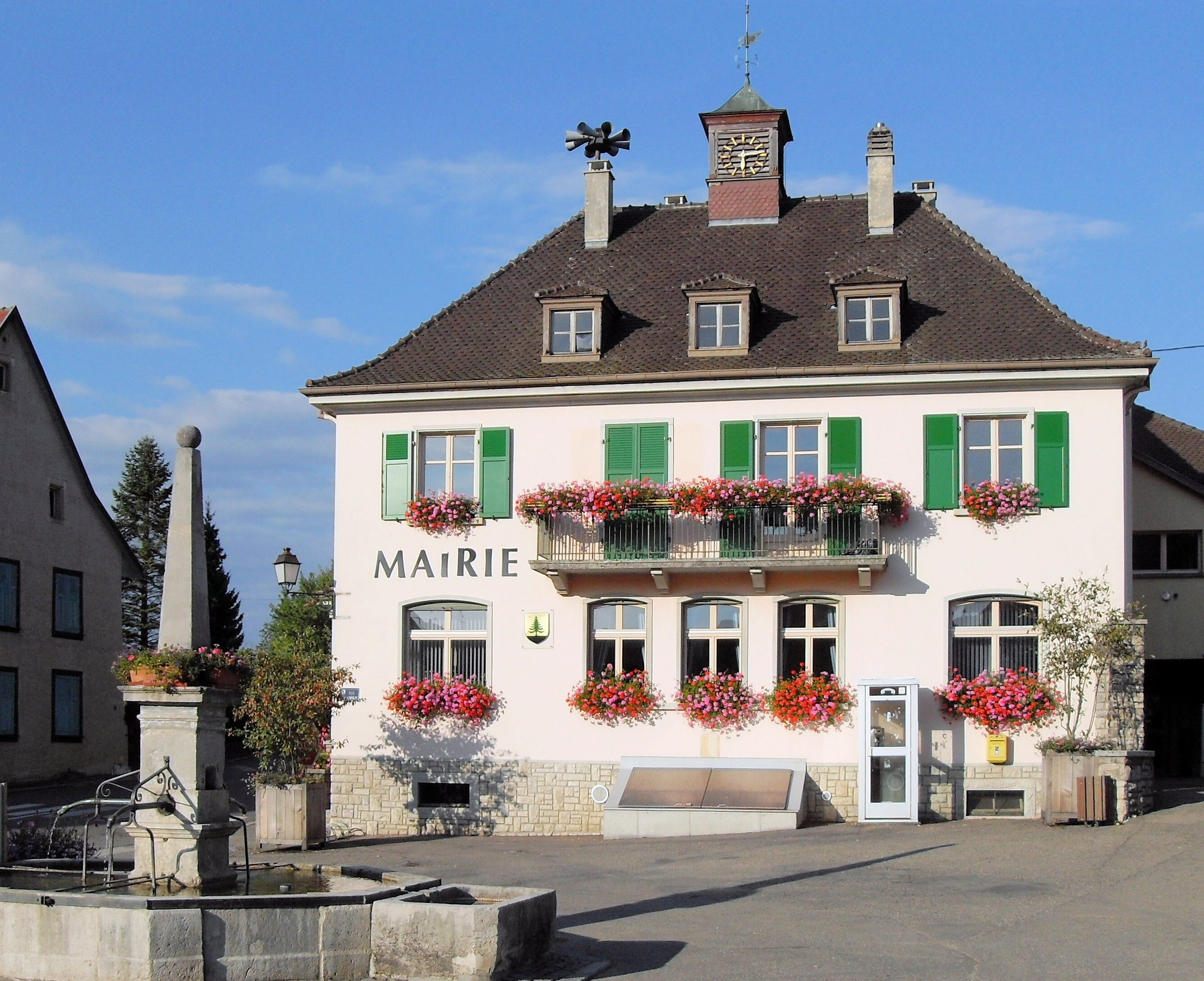
- The town hall in Wolschwiller

- Coat of arms
- Location of Wolschwiller
- Location within France Location within Grand Est
- Coordinates: 47°27′42″N 7°24′31″E
- Country: France
- Region: Grand Est
- Department: Haut-Rhin
- Arrondissement: Altkirch
- Canton: Altkirch
- Intercommunality: Sundgau

Government
  - Mayor (2020–2026): Sylvain Gabriel
- Area^{1}: 10.14 km^{2} (3.92 sq mi)
- Elevation: 440 m (1,440 ft)
- Highest elevation: 831 m (2,726 ft)
- Lowest elevation: 400 m (1,300 ft)
- Population (2023): 431
  - Density: 42.5/km^{2} (110/sq mi)
- Time zone: UTC+01:00 (CET)
  - Summer (DST): UTC+02:00 (CEST)
- INSEE/Postal code: 68380 /68480
- ^{1} French Land Register data, which excludes lakes, ponds, glaciers > 1 km^{2} (0.386 sq mi or 247 acres) and river estuaries.

Wolschwiller (French pronunciation: [vɔlʃvilɛʁ]; German: Wolschweiler) is a commune in the Haut-Rhin department in Alsace in north-eastern France.

== Population ==
Historical population
Year	Pop.	±% p.a.
1968	387	—
1975	397	+0.37%
1982	388	−0.33%
1990	430	+1.29%
1999	430	+0.00%
2007	470	+1.12%
2012	467	−0.13%
2017	453	−0.61%
2023	431	−0.83%
Source: INSEE

== See also ==
- Communes of the Haut-Rhin department
