= Aspach, Haut-Rhin =

Commune in Grand Est, France

Aspach
- Commune
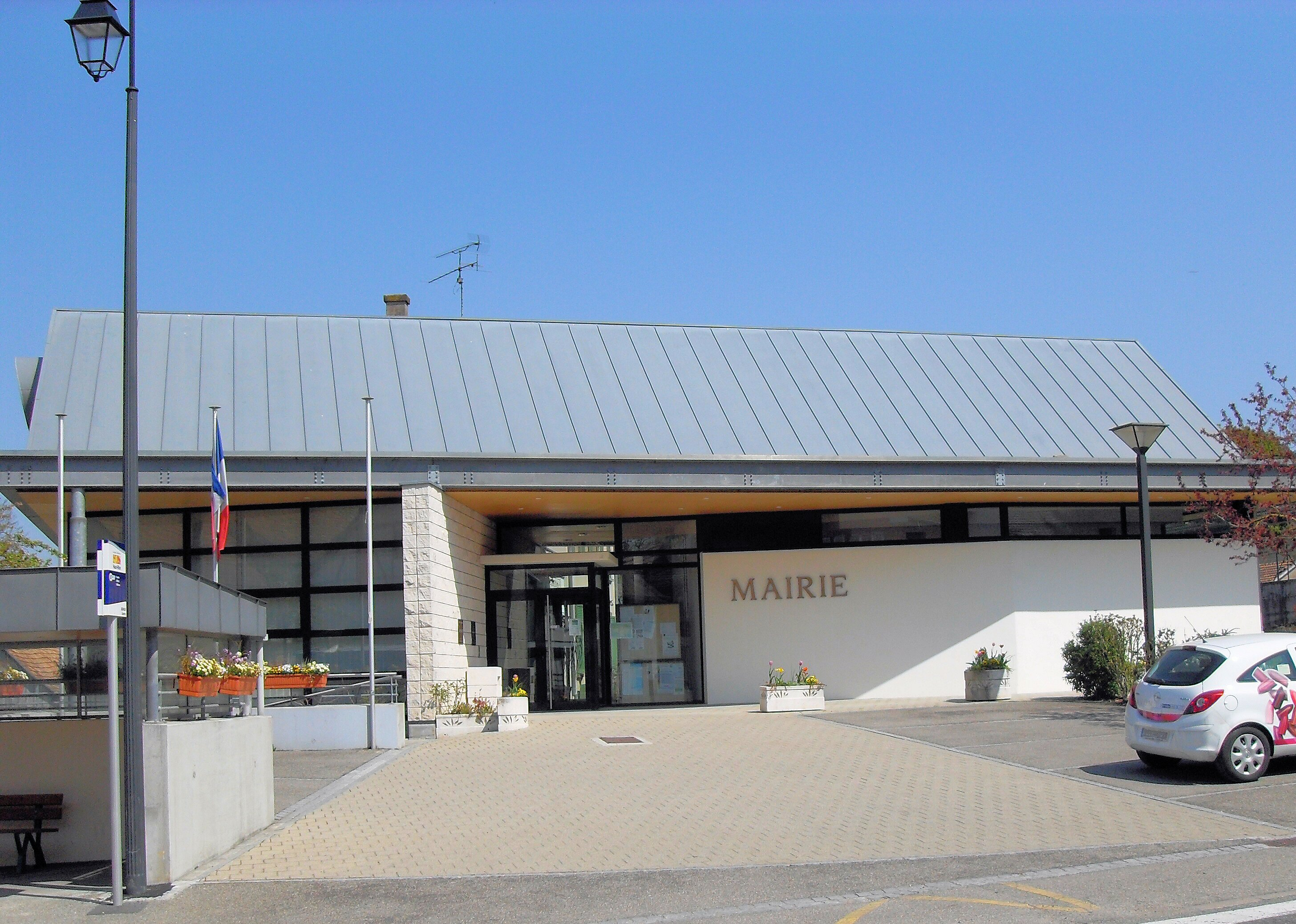
- The town hall in Aspach

- Coat of arms
- Location of Aspach
- Location within France Location within Grand Est
- Coordinates: 47°38′37″N 7°14′05″E
- Country: France
- Region: Grand Est
- Department: Haut-Rhin
- Arrondissement: Altkirch
- Canton: Altkirch
- Intercommunality: CC Sundgau

Government
  - Mayor (2020–2026): Fabien Schoenig
- Area^{1}: 4.2 km^{2} (1.6 sq mi)
- Highest elevation: 386 m (1,266 ft)
- Lowest elevation: 293 m (961 ft)
- Population (2023): 1,138
  - Density: 270/km^{2} (700/sq mi)
- Time zone: UTC+01:00 (CET)
  - Summer (DST): UTC+02:00 (CEST)
- INSEE/Postal code: 68010 /68130
- ^{1} French Land Register data, which excludes lakes, ponds, glaciers > 1 km^{2} (0.386 sq mi or 247 acres) and river estuaries.

Aspach (French pronunciation: [aspak]; Alsatian: Aaschpi) is a commune in the Haut-Rhin department in Alsace in north-eastern France.

== See also ==
- Communes of the Haut-Rhin department
