= Vieux-Ferrette =

Commune in Grand Est, France

- Commune
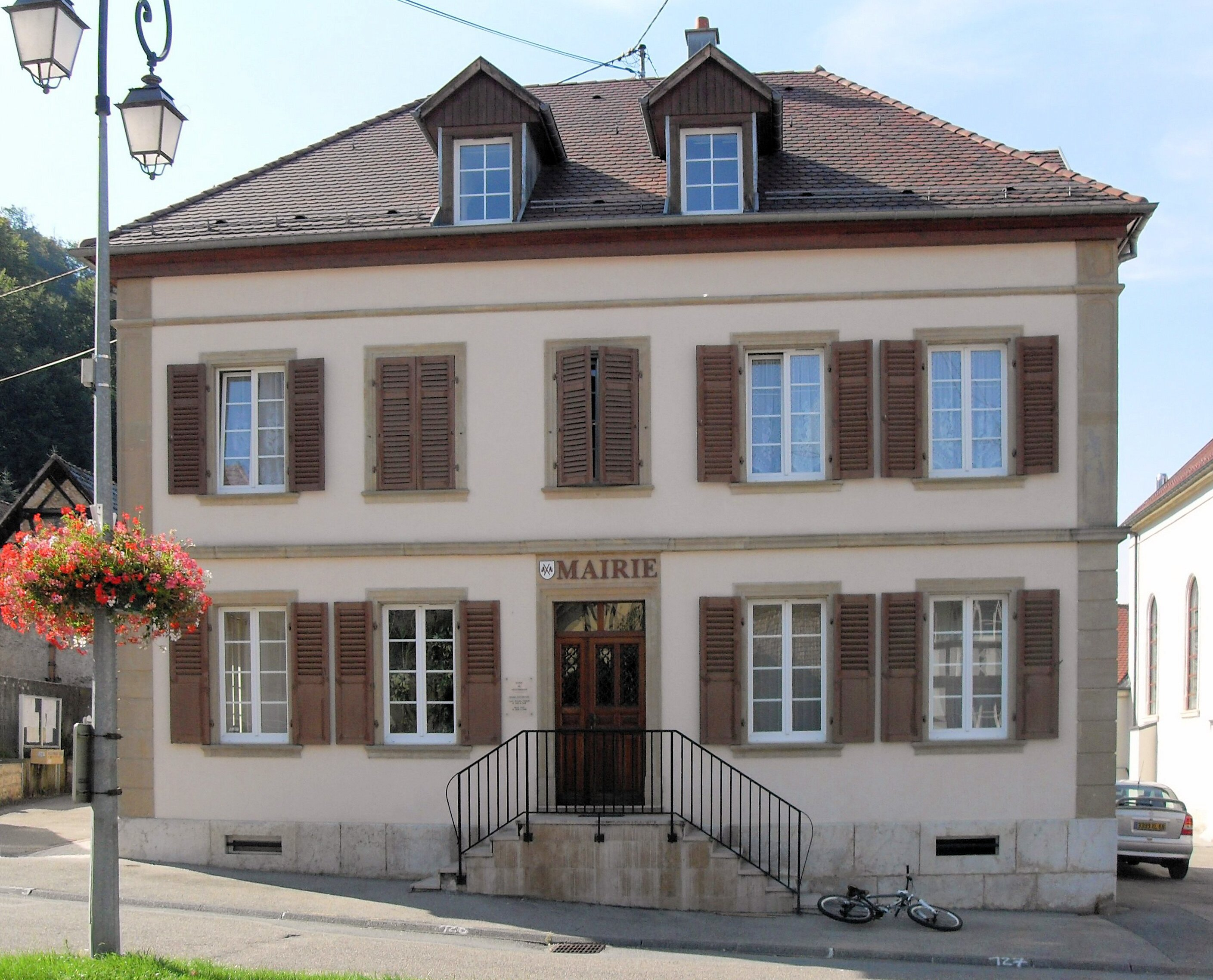
- The town hall in Vieux-Ferrette

- Coat of arms
- Location of Vieux-Ferrette
- Location within France Location within Grand Est
- Coordinates: 47°30′11″N 7°17′59″E
- Country: France
- Region: Grand Est
- Department: Haut-Rhin
- Arrondissement: Altkirch
- Canton: Altkirch

Government
  - Mayor (2020–2026): Gilbert Sorroldoni
- Area^{1}: 6.63 km^{2} (2.56 sq mi)
- Elevation: 485 m (1,591 ft)
- Highest elevation: 670 m (2,200 ft)
- Lowest elevation: 419 m (1,375 ft)
- Population (2023): 640
  - Density: 97/km^{2} (250/sq mi)
- Time zone: UTC+01:00 (CET)
  - Summer (DST): UTC+02:00 (CEST)
- INSEE/Postal code: 68347 /68480
- ^{1} French Land Register data, which excludes lakes, ponds, glaciers > 1 km^{2} (0.386 sq mi or 247 acres) and river estuaries.

Vieux-Ferrette (French pronunciation: [vjø fɛʁɛt]; German: Altpfirt; Alsatian: Olde Pfert) is a commune in the Haut-Rhin department in Alsace in north-eastern France.

== See also ==
- Communes of the Haut-Rhin department
