= Guevenatten =

Commune in Grand Est, France

- Commune
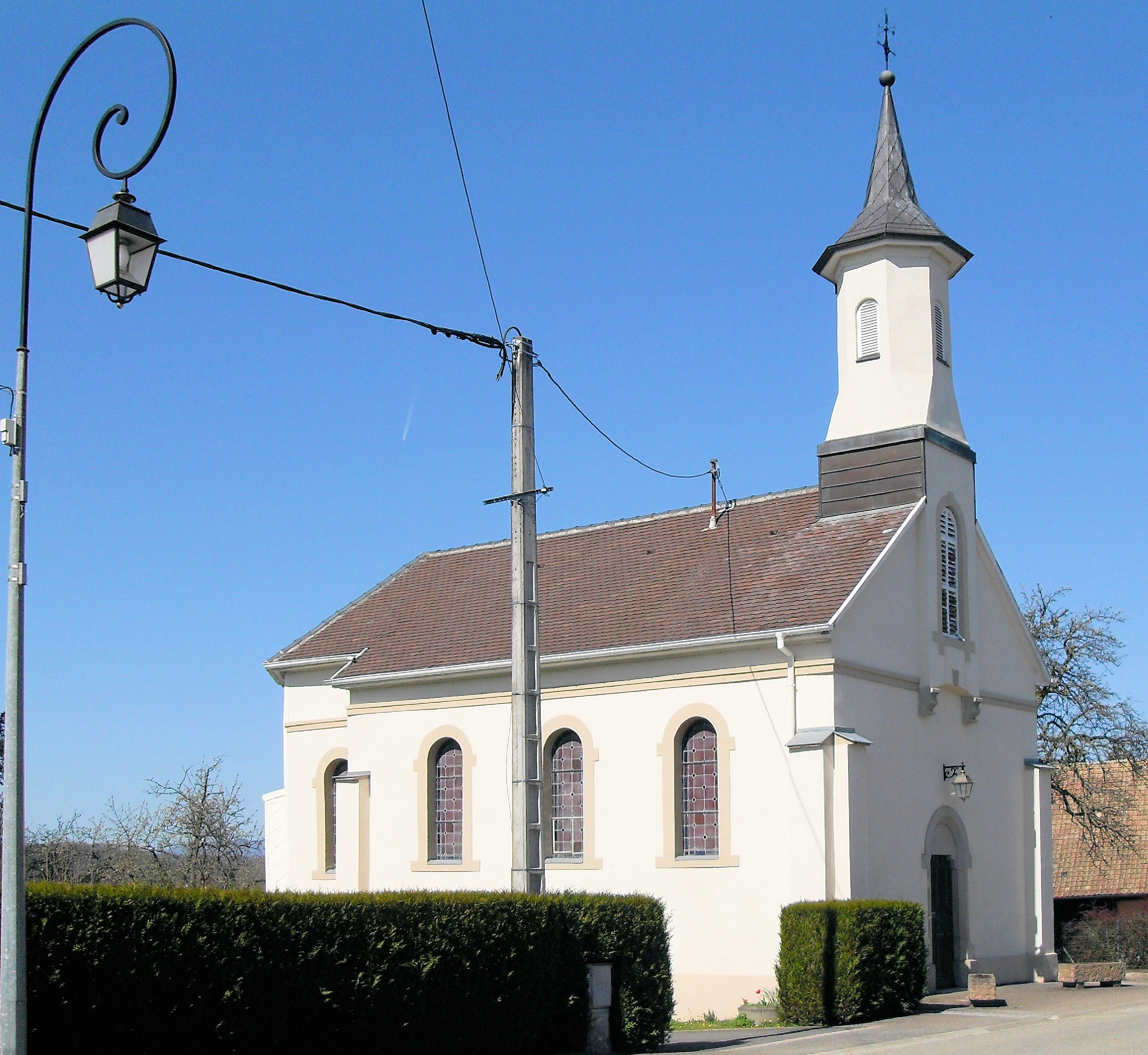
- The chapel in Guevenatten

- Coat of arms
- Location of Guevenatten
- Location within France Location within Grand Est
- Coordinates: 47°40′58″N 7°04′48″E
- Country: France
- Region: Grand Est
- Department: Haut-Rhin
- Arrondissement: Altkirch
- Canton: Masevaux-Niederbruck
- Intercommunality: Sud Alsace Largue

Government
  - Mayor (2020–2026): Bernard Schittly
- Area^{1}: 2.15 km^{2} (0.83 sq mi)
- Elevation: 315 m (1,033 ft)
- Highest elevation: 371 m (1,217 ft)
- Lowest elevation: 305 m (1,001 ft)
- Population (2023): 166
  - Density: 77.2/km^{2} (200/sq mi)
- Time zone: UTC+01:00 (CET)
  - Summer (DST): UTC+02:00 (CEST)
- INSEE/Postal code: 68114 /68210
- ^{1} French Land Register data, which excludes lakes, ponds, glaciers > 1 km^{2} (0.386 sq mi or 247 acres) and river estuaries.

Guevenatten (French pronunciation: [ɡevənatən]; German: Gevenatten) is a commune in the Haut-Rhin department in Alsace in north-eastern France.

== Geography ==
6 km northwest of Dannemarie, Guevenatten occupies a rather rare site in Sundgau, because it is perched on the line of crests separating the valleys of Traubach and Soultzbach, both tributaries of the left bank of releases her(it).

Guevenatten stretches along the R.D.14, twice connecting the RN83 (Main road 83) to Dannemarie by Traubach-le-Haut. On the north of the village, the Sternenberg is the highest point in the municipality at 370 m.

The village preserved a rural character. The surface of the banns is of 217 ha, the used agricultural space represents 87,2%. The woody surface, included in the agricultural space, is of 58 ha of which 35ha of municipal forest.

== See also ==
- Communes of the Haut-Rhin département
