= Durlinsdorf =

Commune in Grand Est, France

- Commune
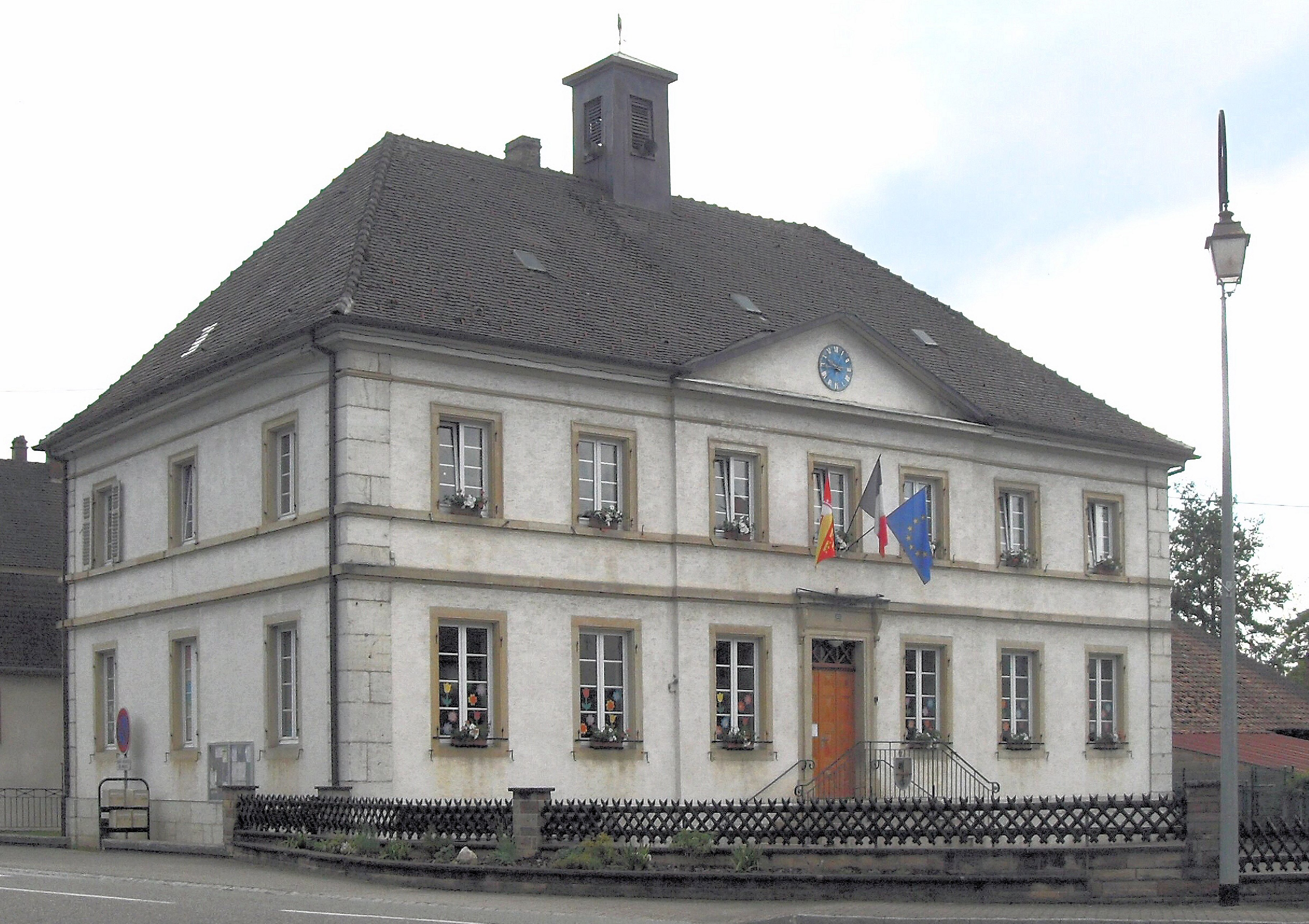
- The town hall and school in Durlinsdorf

- Coat of arms
- Location of Durlinsdorf
- Location within France Location within Grand Est
- Coordinates: 47°29′11″N 7°14′29″E
- Country: France
- Region: Grand Est
- Department: Haut-Rhin
- Arrondissement: Altkirch
- Canton: Altkirch

Government
  - Mayor (2020–2026): Georges Scholl
- Area^{1}: 7.78 km^{2} (3.00 sq mi)
- Elevation: 470 m (1,540 ft)
- Highest elevation: 676 m (2,218 ft)
- Lowest elevation: 420 m (1,380 ft)
- Population (2023): 498
  - Density: 64.0/km^{2} (166/sq mi)
- Time zone: UTC+01:00 (CET)
  - Summer (DST): UTC+02:00 (CEST)
- INSEE/Postal code: 68074 /68480
- ^{1} French Land Register data, which excludes lakes, ponds, glaciers > 1 km^{2} (0.386 sq mi or 247 acres) and river estuaries.

Durlinsdorf (French pronunciation: [dyʁlinsdɔʁf]; German: Dürlinsdorf; Alsatian: Deerlersterf) is a commune in the Haut-Rhin department in Alsace in north-eastern France.

== Administration ==
Durlinsdorf is a part of the Sundgau region, in the arrondissement of Altkirch and the canton of Altkirch.

== Economy ==
Local employment generally not being sufficient to support all the residents of the town, a majority work in nearby Switzerland. However, the following companies do operate in and around Durlinsdorf, and contribute to the local economy.

- A sawmill employing more than 20 people specializing in the frames and construction of country cottages.
- A butcher shop which also operates as a restaurant.
- A wine and liquor shop.
- A company specializing in outdoor party and reception equipment.
- A photographer.

== Church ==
Sts Peter and Paul, Durlinsdorf's historic Roman Catholic church, is built at the end of a rocky outcrop which overlooks the village and the valley of Grumbach. Local tradition holds that the church is built on the site of an old Roman camp, and that the bell-tower is built on the remains of a Roman observation tower. During renovations in 1906 pieces of a massive foundation were uncovered and quickly attributed to the Romans, though without legitimate archaeological research. The current church is the second to occupy the site, the first having collapsed due to foundation shifting. The current bell-tower is thought to date to the 10th or 11th century.

== Wild roses of Durlinsdorf - a legend ==
When the Swedes devastated Sundgau in the year 1632, they also sacked the village of Durlinsdorf. The inhabitants took refuge in the forests of the Jura Mountains and remained there until the departure of the Swedes. When returning to their destroyed homes, they discovered an amazing sight: the deep depression in which Durlinsdorf is nested was covered with wild roses which, since the town's destruction had invaded and entirely occupied the village. The peasants rebuilt Durlinsdorf but preserved some wild roses in their gardens. Some of those roses can still be found around the older homes.

== See also ==
- Communes of the Haut-Rhin department
