= Oberlarg =

Commune in Grand Est, France

- Commune
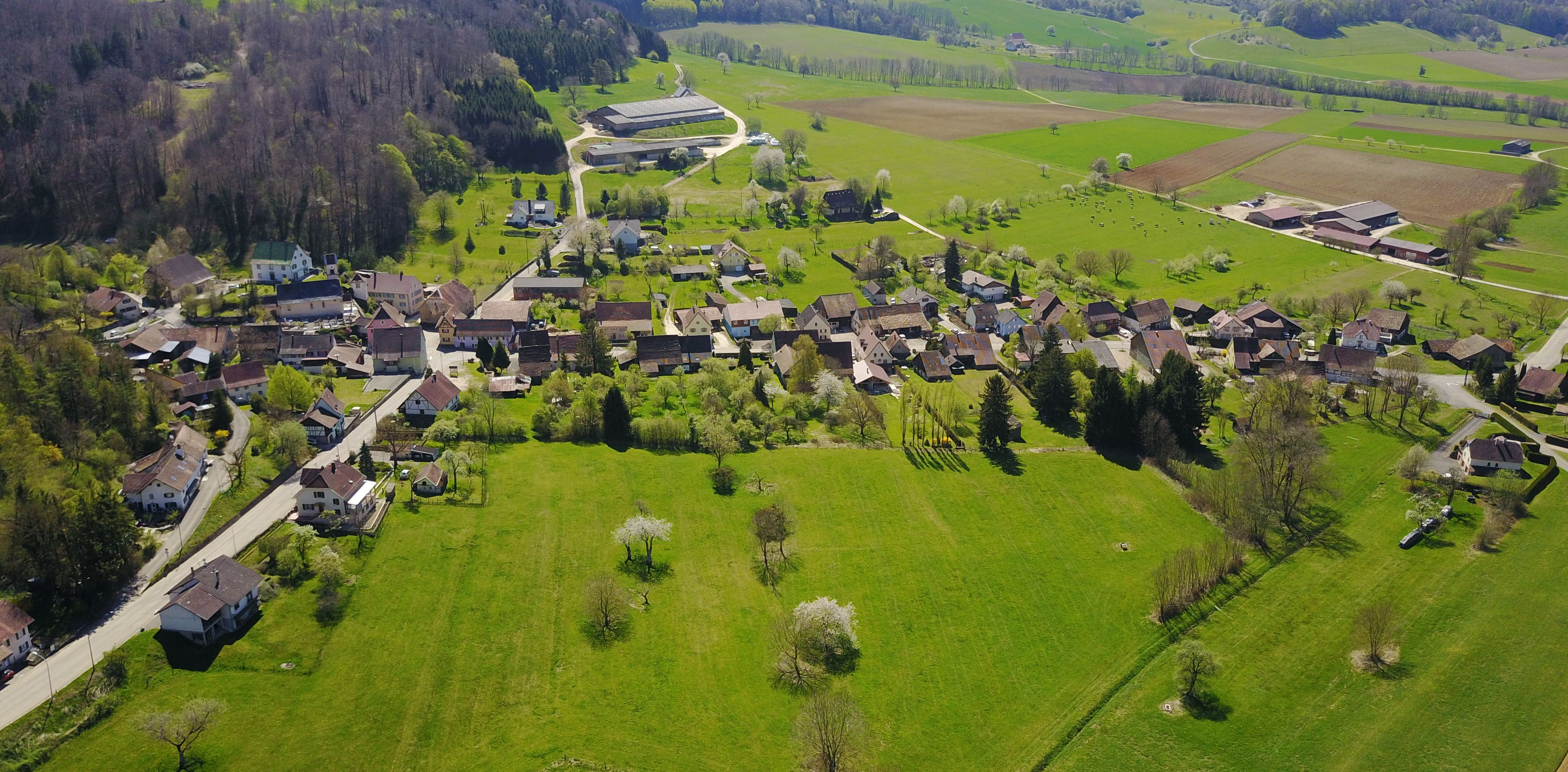
- An aerial view of Oberlarg

- Coat of arms
- Location of Oberlarg
- Location within France Location within Grand Est
- Coordinates: 47°27′30″N 7°14′03″E
- Country: France
- Region: Grand Est
- Department: Haut-Rhin
- Arrondissement: Altkirch
- Canton: Altkirch
- Intercommunality: Sundgau

Government
  - Mayor (2020–2026): Jean-Luc Waeckerli
- Area^{1}: 8.21 km^{2} (3.17 sq mi)
- Elevation: 520 m (1,710 ft)
- Highest elevation: 740 m (2,430 ft)
- Lowest elevation: 482 m (1,581 ft)
- Population (2023): 143
  - Density: 17.4/km^{2} (45.1/sq mi)
- Time zone: UTC+01:00 (CET)
  - Summer (DST): UTC+02:00 (CEST)
- INSEE/Postal code: 68243 /68480
- ^{1} French Land Register data, which excludes lakes, ponds, glaciers > 1 km^{2} (0.386 sq mi or 247 acres) and river estuaries.

Oberlarg is a commune in the Haut-Rhin department in Alsace in north-eastern France.

== Population ==
Historical population
Year	Pop.	±% p.a.
1968	174	—
1975	157	−1.46%
1982	148	−0.84%
1990	146	−0.17%
1999	143	−0.23%
2007	149	+0.52%
2012	152	+0.40%
2017	138	−1.91%
2023	143	+0.59%
Source: INSEE

== See also ==
- Communes of the Haut-Rhin department
