= Hochstatt =

Commune in Grand Est, France

- Commune
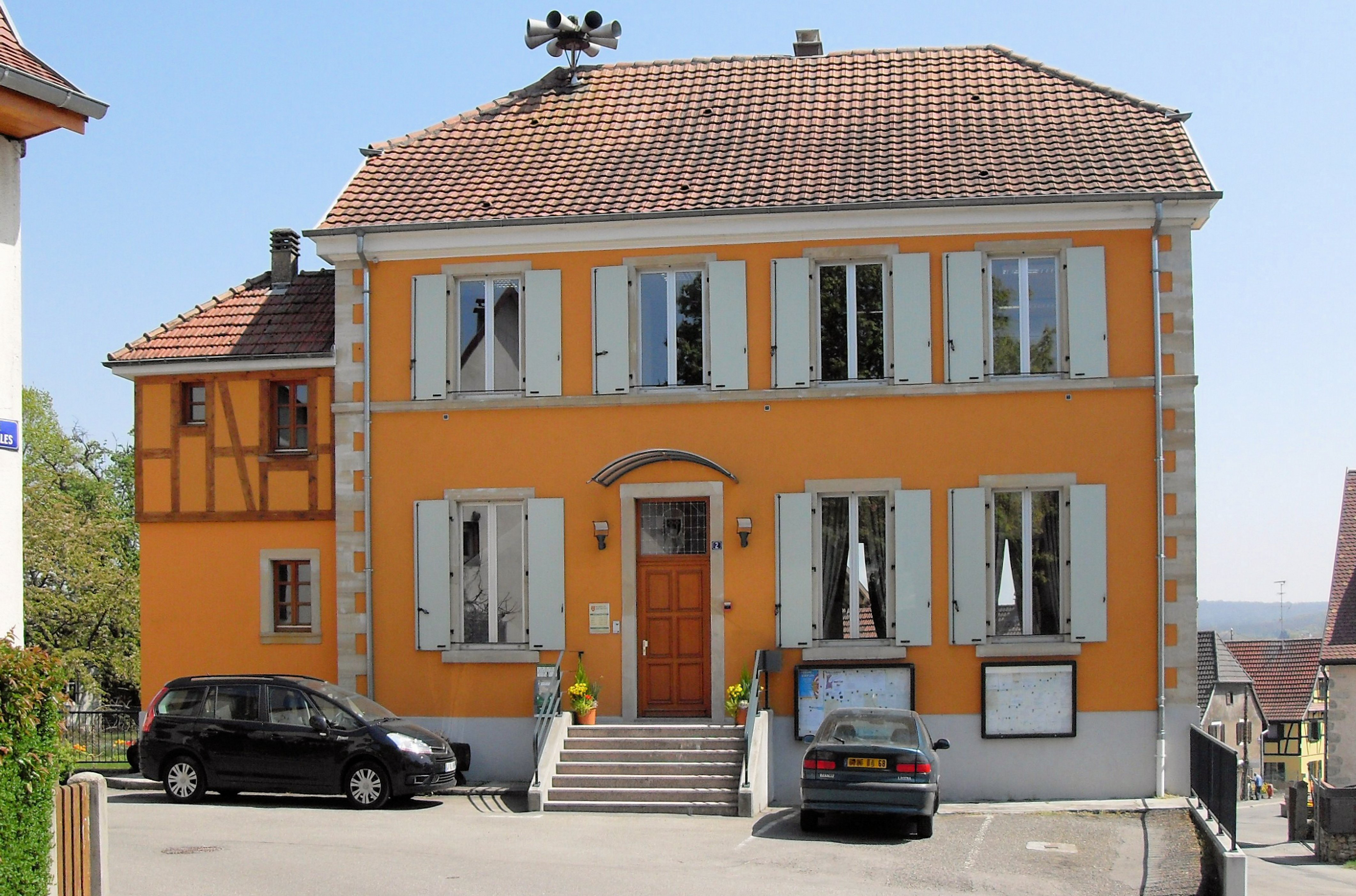
- The town hall in Hochstatt

- Coat of arms
- Location of Hochstatt
- Location within France Location within Grand Est
- Coordinates: 47°42′10″N 7°16′36″E
- Country: France
- Region: Grand Est
- Department: Haut-Rhin
- Arrondissement: Altkirch
- Canton: Altkirch

Government
  - Mayor (2020–2026): Matthieu Hecklen
- Area^{1}: 8.55 km^{2} (3.30 sq mi)
- Elevation: 270 m (890 ft)
- Highest elevation: 320 m (1,050 ft)
- Lowest elevation: 248 m (814 ft)
- Population (2023): 2,173
  - Density: 254/km^{2} (658/sq mi)
- Time zone: UTC+01:00 (CET)
  - Summer (DST): UTC+02:00 (CEST)
- INSEE/Postal code: 68141 /68720
- ^{1} French Land Register data, which excludes lakes, ponds, glaciers > 1 km^{2} (0.386 sq mi or 247 acres) and river estuaries.

Hochstatt (French pronunciation: [ɔkʃtat]; Alsatian: Hooscht Alemannic German pronunciation: [huːʃt]) is a commune in the Haut-Rhin department in Alsace in north-eastern France.

== Population ==
Historical population
Year	Pop.	±% p.a.
1968	1,168	—
1975	1,576	+4.37%
1982	1,913	+2.81%
1990	1,831	−0.55%
1999	1,876	+0.27%
2007	2,078	+1.29%
2012	2,085	+0.07%
2017	2,143	+0.55%
2023	2,173	+0.23%
Source: INSEE

== See also ==
- Communes of the Haut-Rhin département
