= Arrondissement of Altkirch =

Coordinates: 47°37′N 7°14′E

Altkirch
- Arrondissement
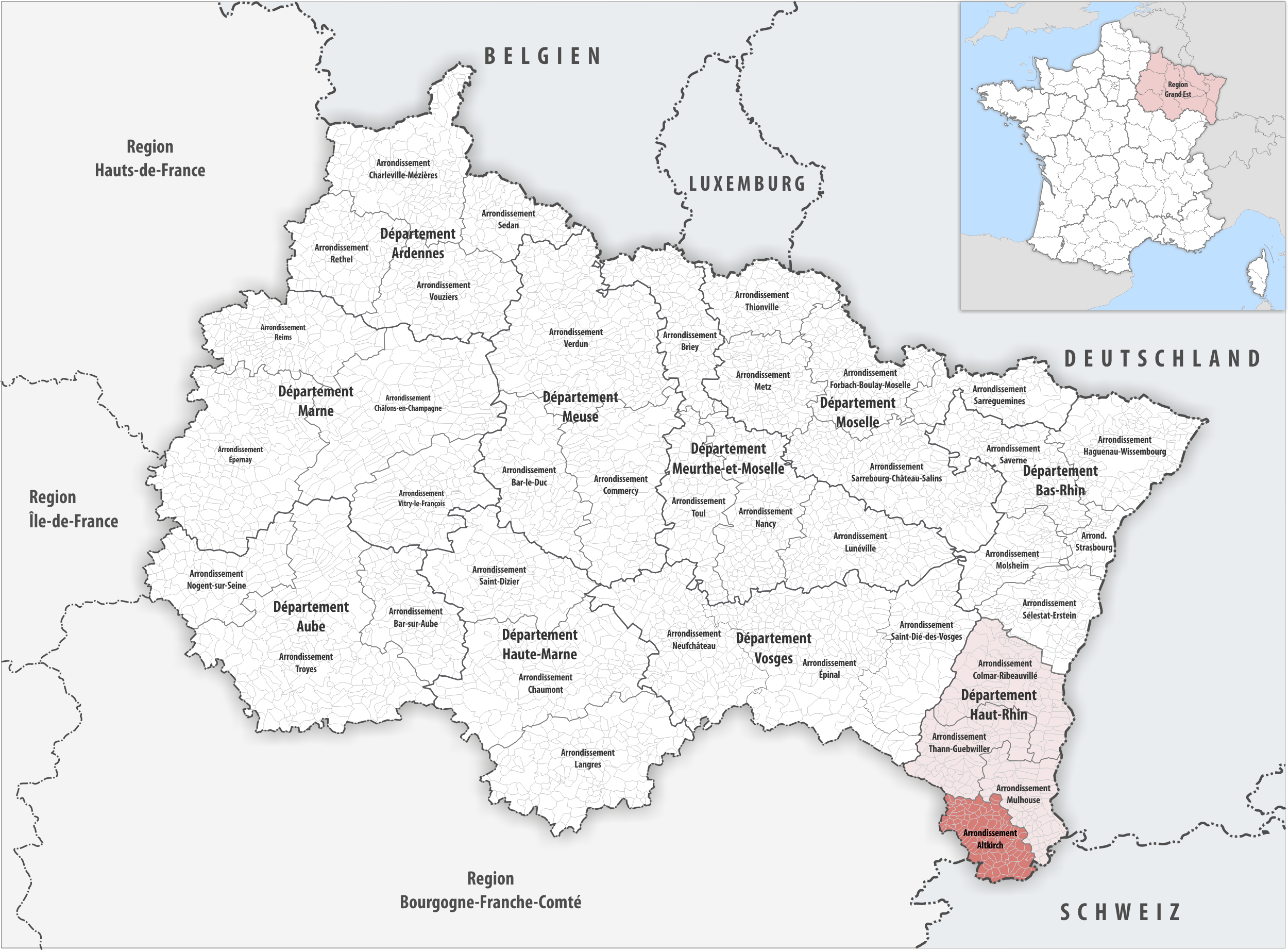
- Location within the region Grand Est
- Country: France
- Region: Grand Est
- Department: Haut-Rhin
- No. of communes: {{{nbcomm}}}
- Area: 663.1 km^{2} (256.0 sq mi)
- Population (2023): 70,225
  - Density: 105.9/km^{2} (274.3/sq mi)
- INSEE code: 681

The arrondissement of Altkirch is an arrondissement of France in the Haut-Rhin department in the Grand Est region. It has 108 communes. Its population is 69,925 (2021), and its area is 663.1 km^{2} (256.0 sq mi).

== Composition ==
The communes of the arrondissement of Altkirch, and their INSEE codes, are:

1. Altenach (68002)
2. Altkirch (68004)
3. Aspach (68010)
4. Ballersdorf (68017)
5. Balschwiller (68018)
6. Bellemagny (68024)
7. Bendorf (68025)
8. Berentzwiller (68027)
9. Bernwiller (68006)
10. Bettendorf (68033)
11. Bettlach (68034)
12. Biederthal (68035)
13. Bisel (68039)
14. Bouxwiller (68049)
15. Bréchaumont (68050)
16. Bretten (68052)
17. Buethwiller (68057)
18. Carspach (68062)
19. Chavannes-sur-l'Étang (68065)
20. Courtavon (68067)
21. Dannemarie (68068)
22. Diefmatten (68071)
23. Durlinsdorf (68074)
24. Durmenach (68075)
25. Eglingen (68077)
26. Elbach (68079)
27. Emlingen (68080)
28. Eteimbes (68085)
29. Falkwiller (68086)
30. Feldbach (68087)
31. Ferrette (68090)
32. Fislis (68092)
33. Franken (68096)
34. Friesen (68098)
35. Frœningen (68099)
36. Fulleren (68100)
37. Gildwiller (68105)
38. Gommersdorf (68107)
39. Guevenatten (68114)
40. Hagenbach (68119)
41. Hausgauen (68124)
42. Hecken (68125)
43. Heidwiller (68127)
44. Heimersdorf (68128)
45. Heiwiller (68131)
46. Hindlingen (68137)
47. Hirsingue (68138)
48. Hirtzbach (68139)
49. Hochstatt (68141)
50. Hundsbach (68148)
51. Illfurth (68152)
52. Illtal (68240)
53. Jettingen (68158)
54. Kiffis (68165)
55. Kœstlach (68169)
56. Largitzen (68176)
57. Levoncourt (68181)
58. Liebsdorf (68184)
59. Ligsdorf (68186)
60. Linsdorf (68187)
61. Lucelle (68190)
62. Luemschwiller (68191)
63. Lutter (68194)
64. Magny (68196)
65. Manspach (68200)
66. Mertzen (68202)
67. Mœrnach (68212)
68. Montreux-Jeune (68214)
69. Montreux-Vieux (68215)
70. Mooslargue (68216)
71. Muespach (68221)
72. Muespach-le-Haut (68222)
73. Oberlarg (68243)
74. Obermorschwiller (68245)
75. Oltingue (68248)
76. Pfetterhouse (68257)
77. Raedersdorf (68259)
78. Retzwiller (68268)
79. Riespach (68273)
80. Romagny (68282)
81. Roppentzwiller (68284)
82. Ruederbach (68288)
83. Saint-Bernard (68081)
84. Saint-Cosme (68293)
85. Saint-Ulrich (68299)
86. Schwoben (68303)
87. Seppois-le-Bas (68305)
88. Seppois-le-Haut (68306)
89. Sondersdorf (68312)
90. Spechbach (68320)
91. Steinsoultz (68325)
92. Sternenberg (68326)
93. Strueth (68330)
94. Tagolsheim (68332)
95. Tagsdorf (68333)
96. Traubach-le-Bas (68336)
97. Traubach-le-Haut (68337)
98. Ueberstrass (68340)
99. Valdieu-Lutran (68192)
100. Vieux-Ferrette (68347)
101. Waldighofen (68355)
102. Walheim (68356)
103. Werentzhouse (68363)
104. Willer (68371)
105. Winkel (68373)
106. Wittersdorf (68377)
107. Wolfersdorf (68378)
108. Wolschwiller (68380)

== History ==
The arrondissement of Altkirch was created in 1800. In 1857 the subprefecture was moved to Mulhouse. The arrondissement of Altkirch was restored in 1919. In January 2015 it absorbed the commune of Bernwiller from the former arrondissement of Thann.

As a result of the reorganisation of the cantons of France which came into effect in 2015, the borders of the cantons are no longer related to the borders of the arrondissements. The cantons of the arrondissement of Altkirch were, as of January 2015:

1. Altkirch
2. Dannemarie
3. Ferrette
4. Hirsingue
