= Durmenach =

Commune in Grand Est, France

- Commune
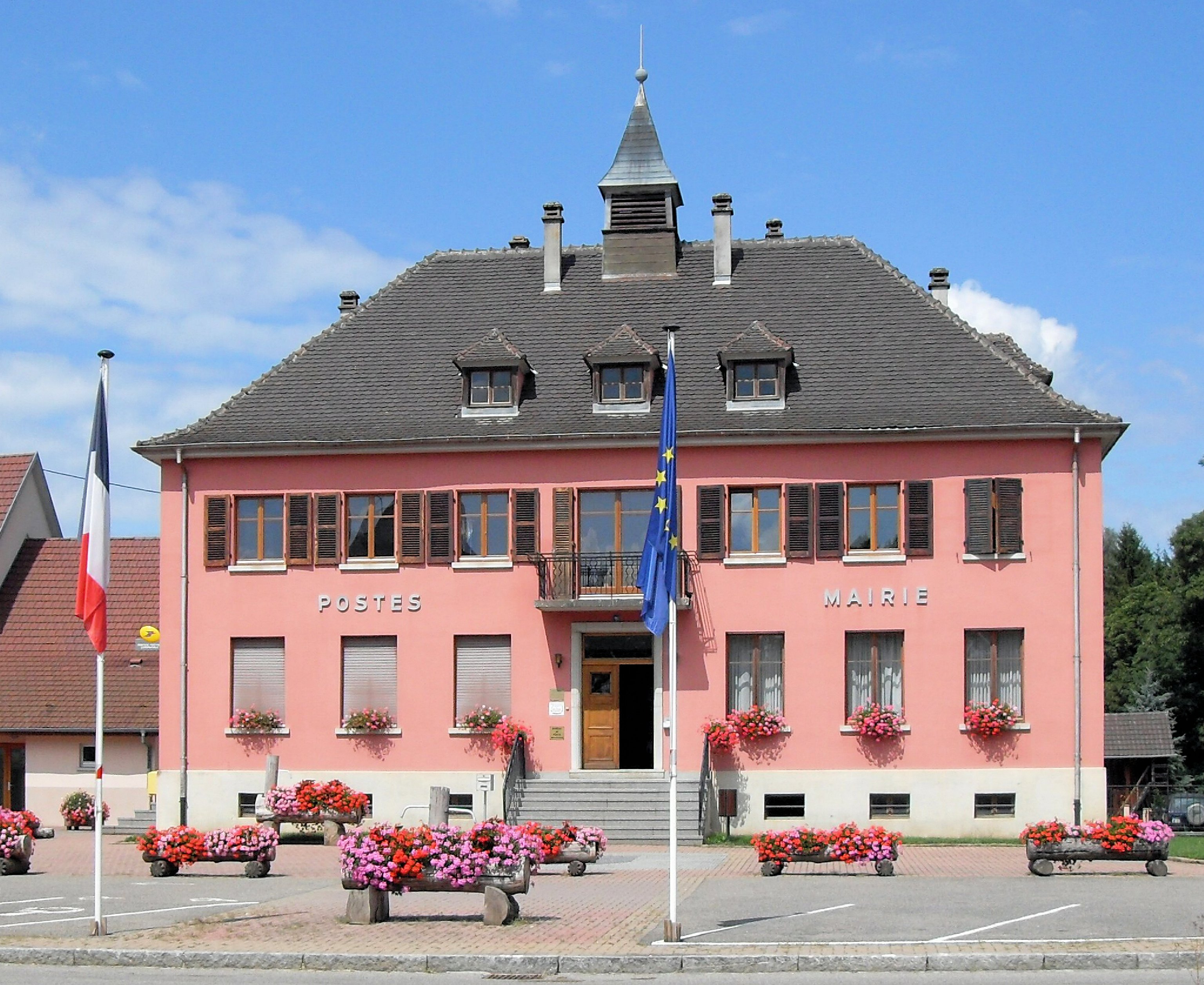
- The town hall in Durmenach

- Coat of arms
- Location of Durmenach
- Location within France Location within Grand Est
- Coordinates: 47°31′40″N 7°20′20″E
- Country: France
- Region: Grand Est
- Department: Haut-Rhin
- Arrondissement: Altkirch
- Canton: Altkirch

Government
  - Mayor (2020–2026): Dominique Springinsfeld
- Area^{1}: 5.76 km^{2} (2.22 sq mi)
- Elevation: 365 m (1,198 ft)
- Highest elevation: 461 m (1,512 ft)
- Lowest elevation: 360 m (1,180 ft)
- Population (2023): 836
  - Density: 145/km^{2} (376/sq mi)
- Time zone: UTC+01:00 (CET)
  - Summer (DST): UTC+02:00 (CEST)
- INSEE/Postal code: 68075 /68480
- ^{1} French Land Register data, which excludes lakes, ponds, glaciers > 1 km^{2} (0.386 sq mi or 247 acres) and river estuaries.

Durmenach (French pronunciation: [dyʁmənak]; German: Dürmenach) is a commune in the Haut-Rhin department in Alsace in north-eastern France. It is one of the 120 villages that composes the Sundgau.

== History ==
With the Treaty of Westphalia in 1648, Habsburg domination ceased and Durmenach became French.

The village was an important Jewish settlement in the 15th century. Most of the houses in the centre were built by Jewish families between the 16th and 18th centuries.

In 1826, the Jews still lived in 66 different houses. Durmenach still had 650 Jews out of 1,000 inhabitants at that time.

In 1846, the Jewish population represented more than 56% of village.

On 29 February 1848 the last antisemitic pogrom in France took place and it happened in the village and its surroundings. It is also called Juden Rumpel or Judenrumpell. 75 Jewish houses were burned. An odonym (Rue du 29-Février) commemorates this event.

After 1940, most Jews had left or been deported and did not return after the Liberation.

The Jewish cemetery of Durmenach dates from the end of the 18th century and at the time contained a thousand tombs, 300 of which are still visible.

== See also ==
- Communes of the Haut-Rhin department
