= Werentzhouse =

Commune in Grand Est, France

- Commune
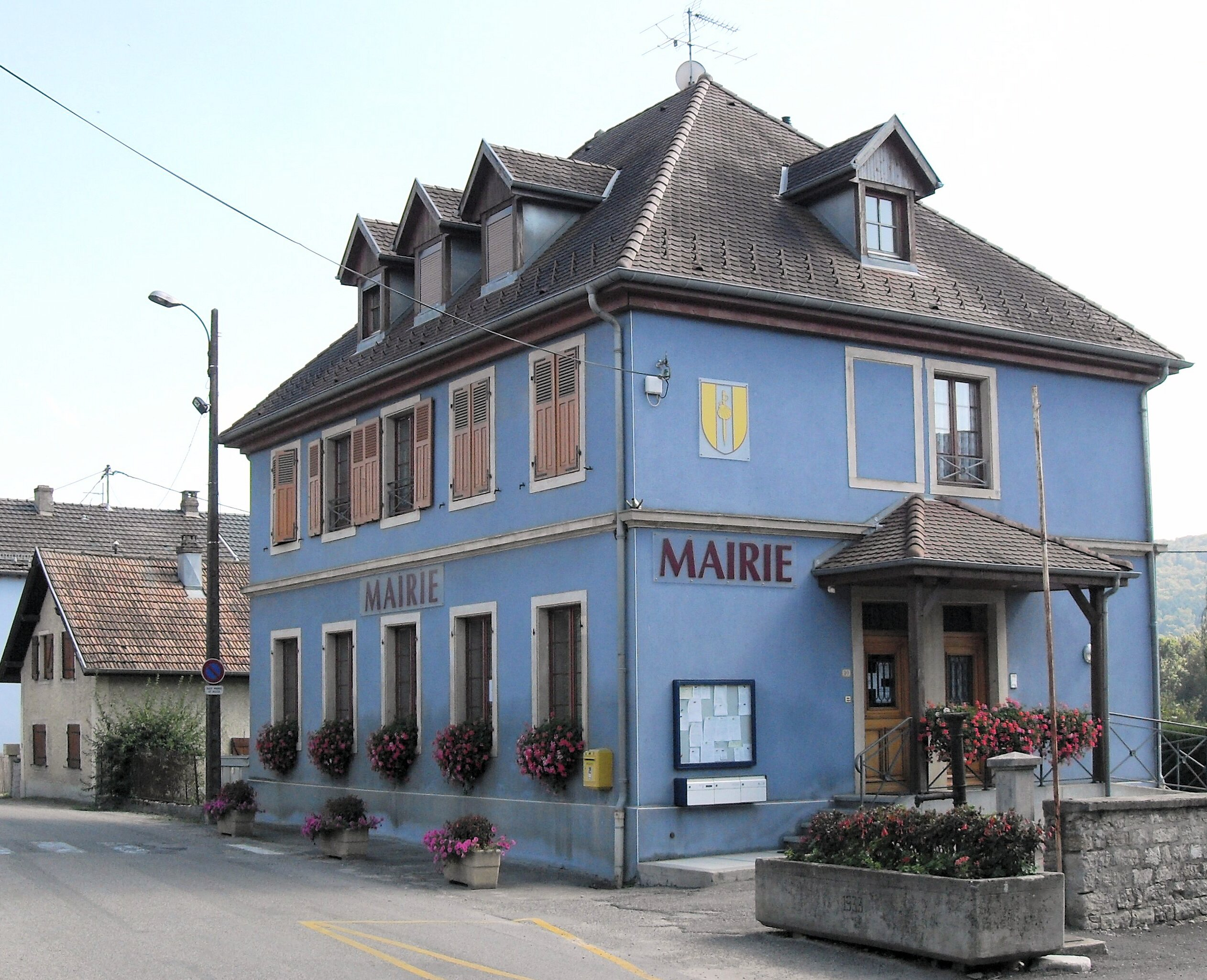
- The town hall in Werentzhouse

- Coat of arms
- Location of Werentzhouse
- Location within France Location within Grand Est
- Coordinates: 47°31′04″N 7°21′29″E
- Country: France
- Region: Grand Est
- Department: Haut-Rhin
- Arrondissement: Altkirch
- Canton: Altkirch
- Intercommunality: Sundgau

Government
  - Mayor (2020–2026): Éric Gutzwiller
- Area^{1}: 4.5 km^{2} (1.7 sq mi)
- Elevation: 376 m (1,234 ft)
- Highest elevation: 471 m (1,545 ft)
- Lowest elevation: 367 m (1,204 ft)
- Population (2023): 633
  - Density: 140/km^{2} (360/sq mi)
- Time zone: UTC+01:00 (CET)
  - Summer (DST): UTC+02:00 (CEST)
- INSEE/Postal code: 68363 /68480
- ^{1} French Land Register data, which excludes lakes, ponds, glaciers > 1 km^{2} (0.386 sq mi or 247 acres) and river estuaries.

Werentzhouse (French pronunciation: [vɛʁəntsuz]; German: Werenzhausen) is a commune in the Haut-Rhin department in Alsace in north-eastern France.

== Population ==
Historical population
Year	Pop.	±% p.a.
1968	357	—
1975	401	+1.67%
1982	421	+0.70%
1990	462	+1.17%
1999	555	+2.06%
2007	587	+0.70%
2012	578	−0.31%
2017	544	−1.21%
2023	633	+2.56%
Source: INSEE

== See also ==
- Communes of the Haut-Rhin department
