= Jettingen, Haut-Rhin =

Commune in Grand Est, France

Jettingen
- Commune
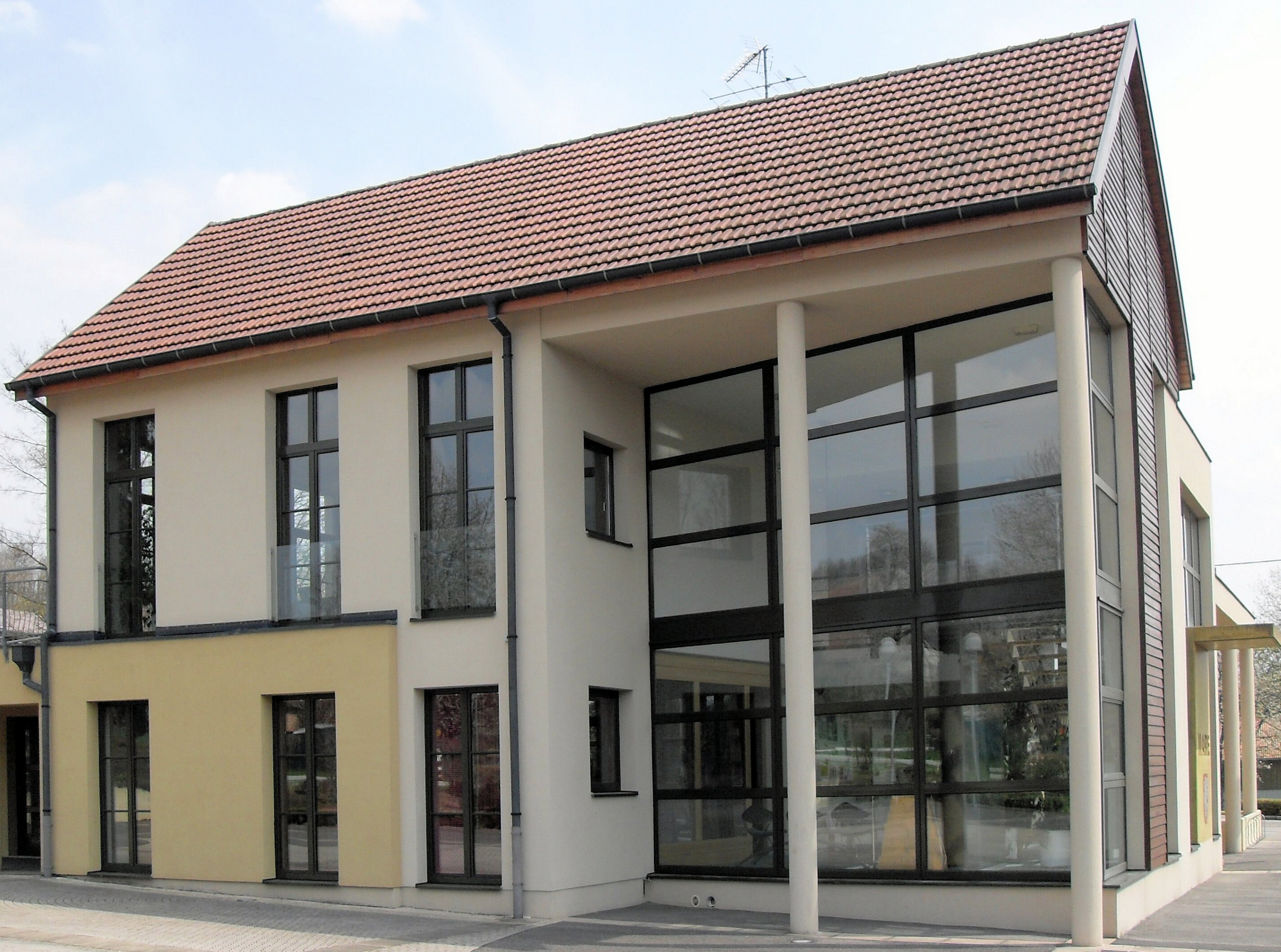
- The town hall in Jettingen

- Coat of arms
- Location of Jettingen
- Location within France Location within Grand Est
- Coordinates: 47°35′55″N 7°22′20″E
- Country: France
- Region: Grand Est
- Department: Haut-Rhin
- Arrondissement: Altkirch
- Canton: Altkirch

Government
  - Mayor (2020–2026): Jean-Claude Colin
- Area^{1}: 6.3 km^{2} (2.4 sq mi)
- Elevation: 350 m (1,150 ft)
- Highest elevation: 431 m (1,414 ft)
- Lowest elevation: 338 m (1,109 ft)
- Population (2023): 522
  - Density: 83/km^{2} (210/sq mi)
- Time zone: UTC+01:00 (CET)
  - Summer (DST): UTC+02:00 (CEST)
- INSEE/Postal code: 68158 /68130
- ^{1} French Land Register data, which excludes lakes, ponds, glaciers > 1 km^{2} (0.386 sq mi or 247 acres) and river estuaries.

Jettingen is a commune in the Haut-Rhin department in Alsace in north-eastern France.

== See also ==
- Communes of the Haut-Rhin département
