= Fulleren =

Commune in Grand Est, France

- Commune
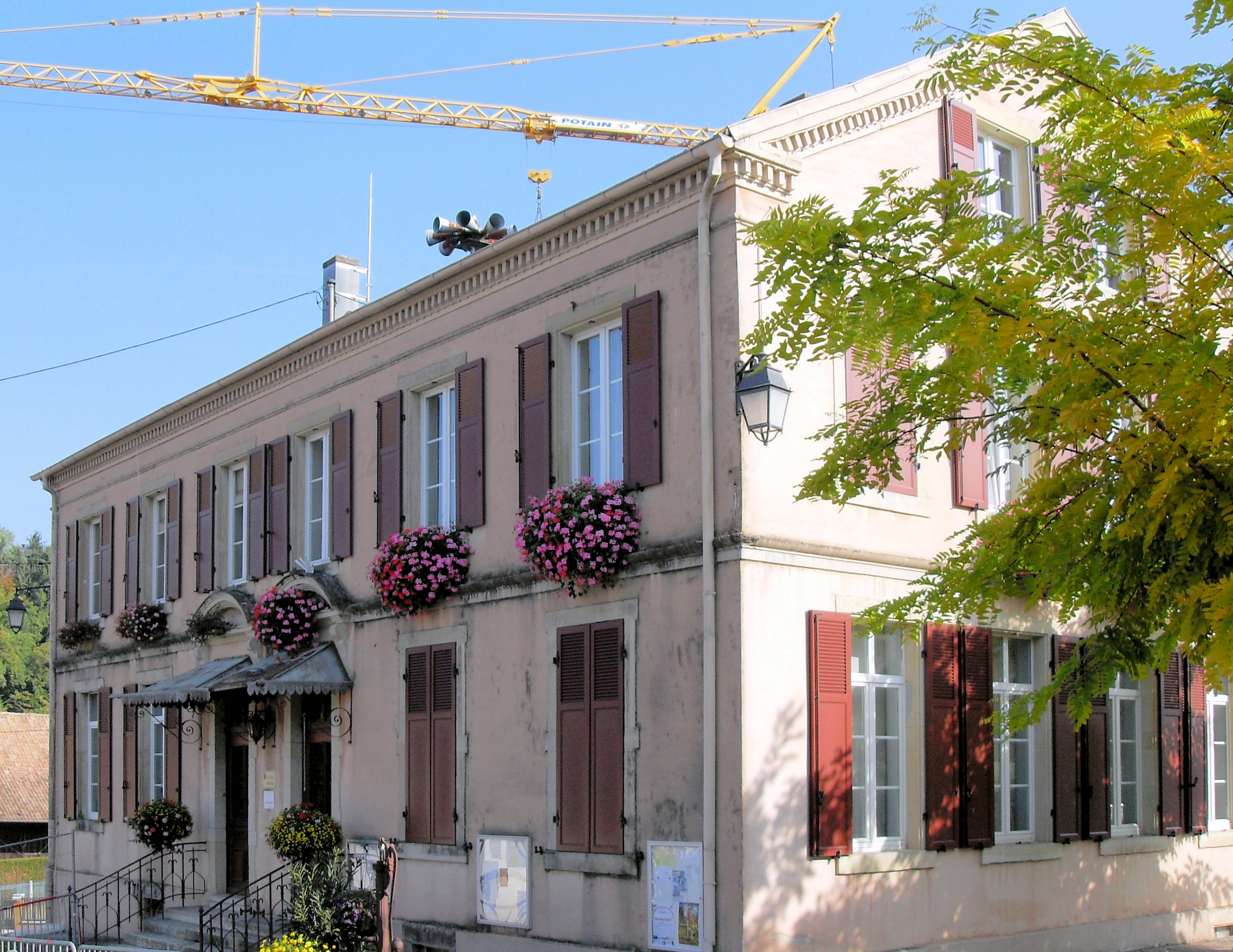
- The town hall and school in Fulleren

- Coat of arms
- Location of Fulleren
- Location within France Location within Grand Est
- Coordinates: 47°35′41″N 7°08′49″E
- Country: France
- Region: Grand Est
- Department: Haut-Rhin
- Arrondissement: Altkirch
- Canton: Masevaux-Niederbruck

Government
  - Mayor (2020–2026): Patrick Clory
- Area^{1}: 5.31 km^{2} (2.05 sq mi)
- Elevation: 360 m (1,180 ft)
- Highest elevation: 402 m (1,319 ft)
- Lowest elevation: 336 m (1,102 ft)
- Population (2023): 331
  - Density: 62.3/km^{2} (161/sq mi)
- Time zone: UTC+01:00 (CET)
  - Summer (DST): UTC+02:00 (CEST)
- INSEE/Postal code: 68100 /68210
- ^{1} French Land Register data, which excludes lakes, ponds, glaciers > 1 km^{2} (0.386 sq mi or 247 acres) and river estuaries.

Fulleren (French pronunciation: [fyləʁən]; German: Füllern) is a commune in the Haut-Rhin department in Alsace in north-eastern France.

== See also ==
- Communes of the Haut-Rhin département
