= Liebsdorf =

Commune in Grand Est, France

- Commune
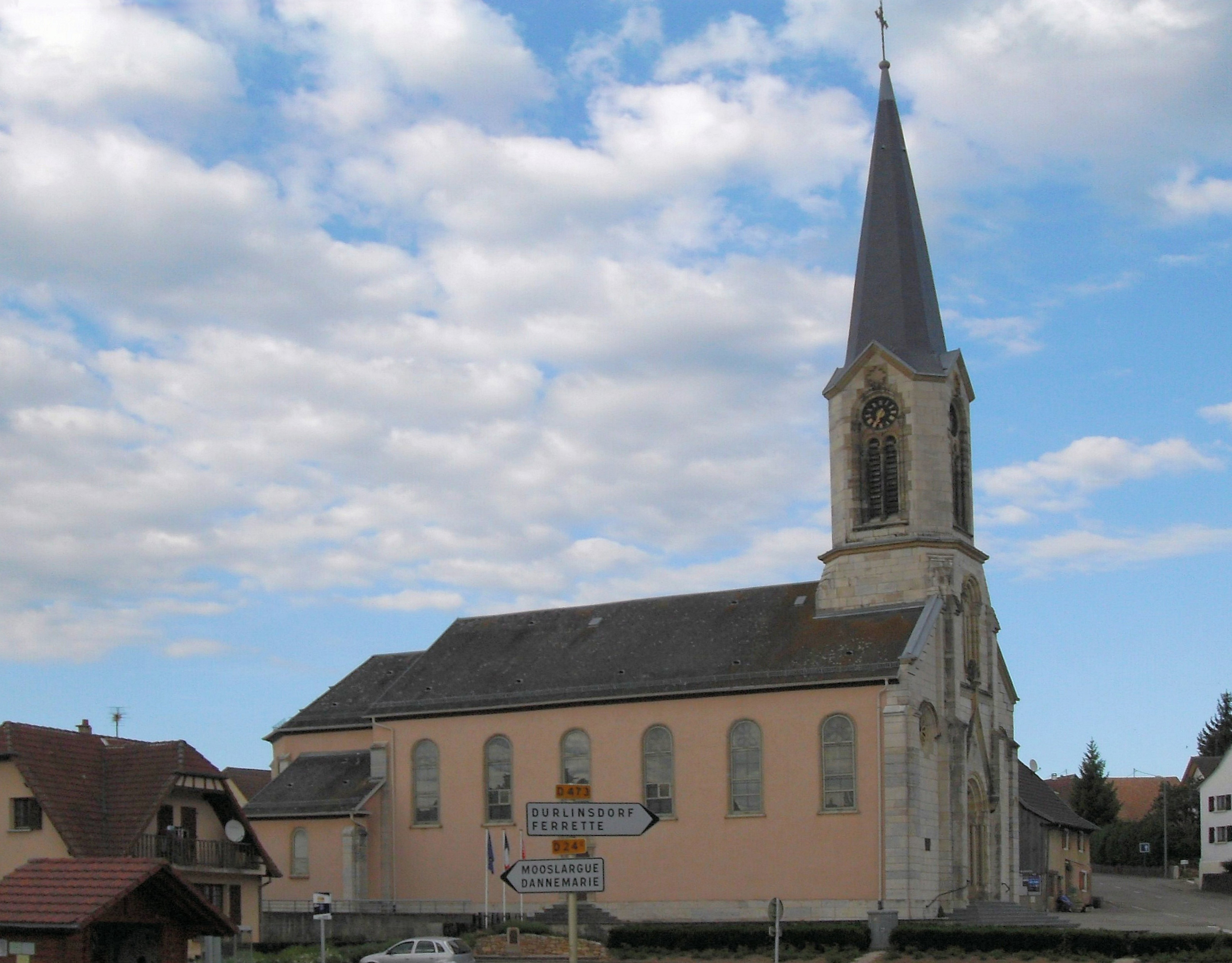
- The church in Liebsdorf

- Coat of arms
- Location of Liebsdorf
- Location within France Location within Grand Est
- Coordinates: 47°28′47″N 7°13′54″E
- Country: France
- Region: Grand Est
- Department: Haut-Rhin
- Arrondissement: Altkirch
- Canton: Altkirch
- Intercommunality: Sundgau

Government
  - Mayor (2020–2026): Hugues Durand
- Area^{1}: 4.22 km^{2} (1.63 sq mi)
- Elevation: 475 m (1,558 ft)
- Highest elevation: 683 m (2,241 ft)
- Lowest elevation: 420 m (1,380 ft)
- Population (2023): 286
  - Density: 67.8/km^{2} (176/sq mi)
- Time zone: UTC+01:00 (CET)
  - Summer (DST): UTC+02:00 (CEST)
- INSEE/Postal code: 68184 /68480
- ^{1} French Land Register data, which excludes lakes, ponds, glaciers > 1 km^{2} (0.386 sq mi or 247 acres) and river estuaries.

Liebsdorf (French pronunciation: [lipsdɔʁf]; Frainc-Comtou: Elveûcouét) is a commune in the Haut-Rhin department in Alsace in north-eastern France.

== See also ==
- Communes of the Haut-Rhin département
