= Oltingue =

Commune in Grand Est, France

- Commune
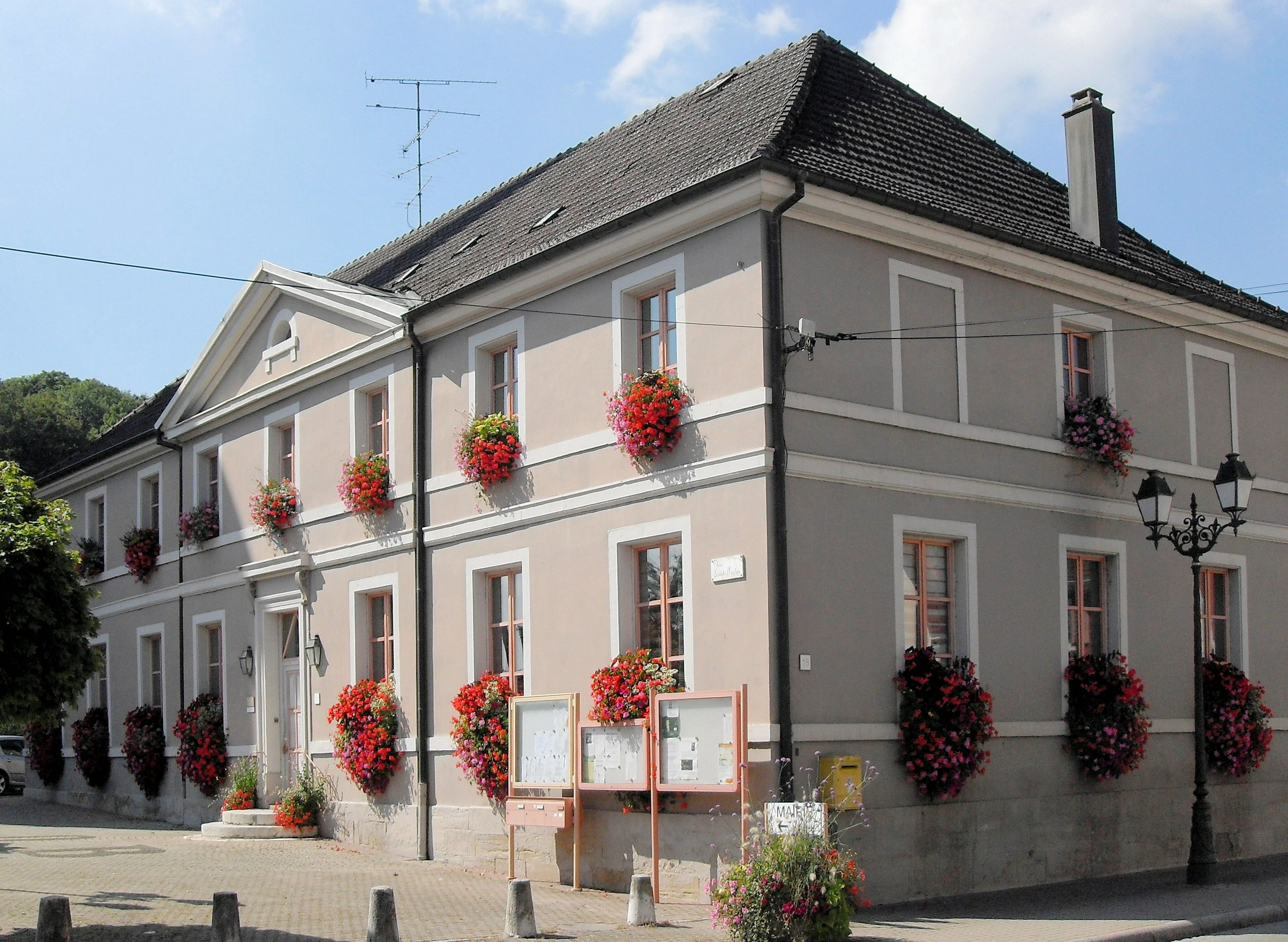
- The town hall in Oltingue

- Coat of arms
- Location of Oltingue
- Location within France Location within Grand Est
- Coordinates: 47°29′32″N 7°23′33″E
- Country: France
- Region: Grand Est
- Department: Haut-Rhin
- Arrondissement: Altkirch
- Canton: Altkirch

Government
  - Mayor (2020–2026): Philippe Wahl
- Area^{1}: 13.42 km^{2} (5.18 sq mi)
- Elevation: 400 m (1,300 ft)
- Highest elevation: 531 m (1,742 ft)
- Lowest elevation: 387 m (1,270 ft)
- Population (2023): 695
  - Density: 51.8/km^{2} (134/sq mi)
- Time zone: UTC+01:00 (CET)
  - Summer (DST): UTC+02:00 (CEST)
- INSEE/Postal code: 68248 /68480
- ^{1} French Land Register data, which excludes lakes, ponds, glaciers > 1 km^{2} (0.386 sq mi or 247 acres) and river estuaries.

Oltingue (French pronunciation: [ɔltɛ̃ɡ]; German: Oltingen; Alsatian: Oltige) is a commune in the Haut-Rhin department in Alsace in north-eastern France.

== See also ==
- Communes of the Haut-Rhin department
