= Friesen =

Commune in Grand Est, France

- Commune
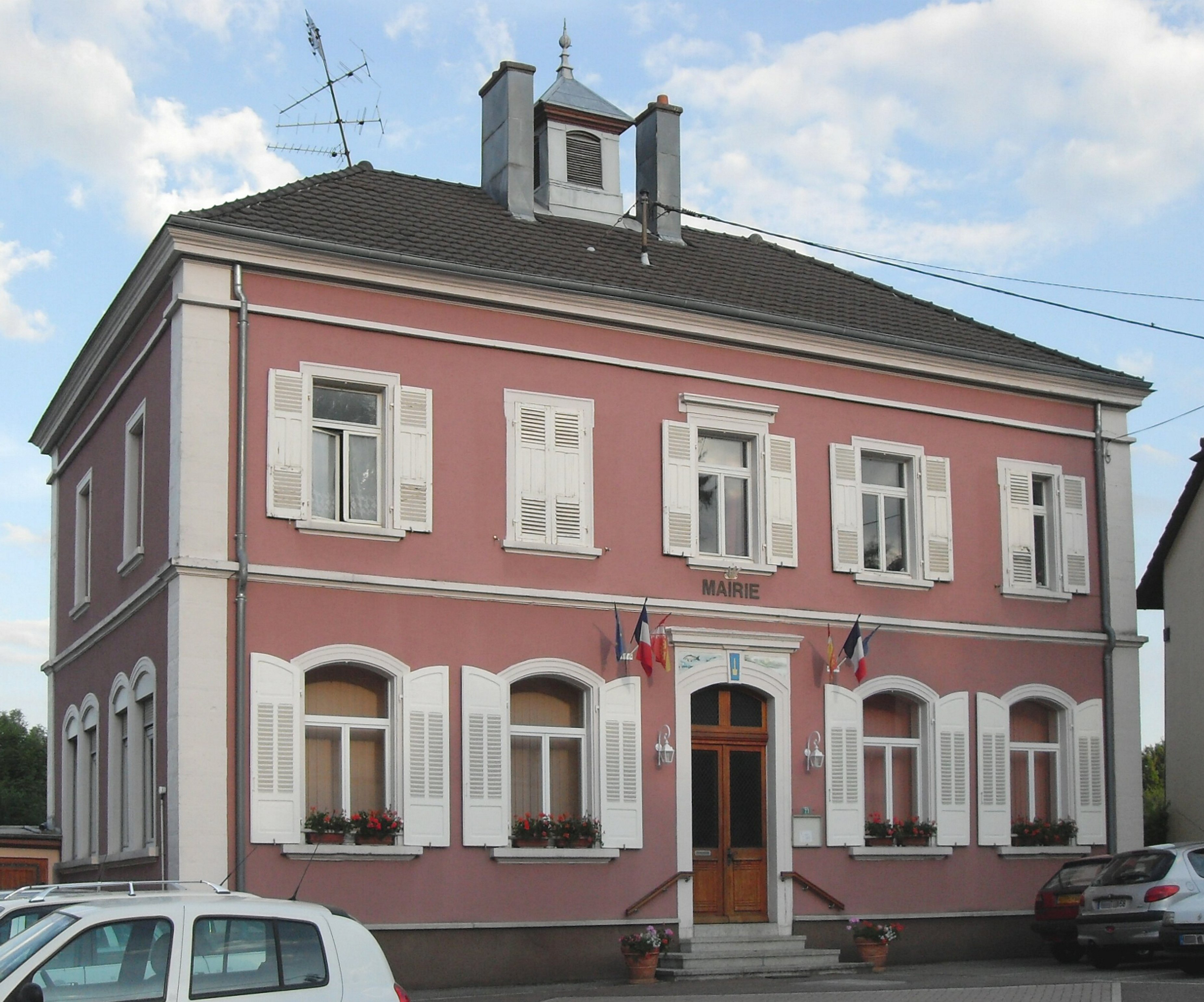
- The town hall in Friesen

- Coat of arms
- Location of Friesen
- Location within France Location within Grand Est
- Coordinates: 47°33′57″N 7°09′03″E
- Country: France
- Region: Grand Est
- Department: Haut-Rhin
- Arrondissement: Altkirch
- Canton: Masevaux-Niederbruck

Government
  - Mayor (2020–2026): Claude Geiger
- Area^{1}: 8.42 km^{2} (3.25 sq mi)
- Elevation: 360 m (1,180 ft)
- Highest elevation: 417 m (1,368 ft)
- Lowest elevation: 345 m (1,132 ft)
- Population (2023): 651
  - Density: 77.3/km^{2} (200/sq mi)
- Time zone: UTC+01:00 (CET)
  - Summer (DST): UTC+02:00 (CEST)
- INSEE/Postal code: 68098 /68580
- ^{1} French Land Register data, which excludes lakes, ponds, glaciers > 1 km^{2} (0.386 sq mi or 247 acres) and river estuaries.

Friesen (French pronunciation: [fʁizən]; Alsatian: Friese) is a commune in the Haut-Rhin department in Alsace in north-eastern France in the Largue Valley.

== Cultural heritage ==
Friesen is known for its architectural heritage. The commune is home to approximately 50 half-timbered homes, built from 1497 to 1878. Among these homes exists the oldest one in the Sundgau region.

== Demographics ==
Friesen's population by year: 1962-2008

== See also ==
- Communes of the Haut-Rhin département
