= Franken, Haut-Rhin =

Commune in Grand Est, France

Franken
- Commune
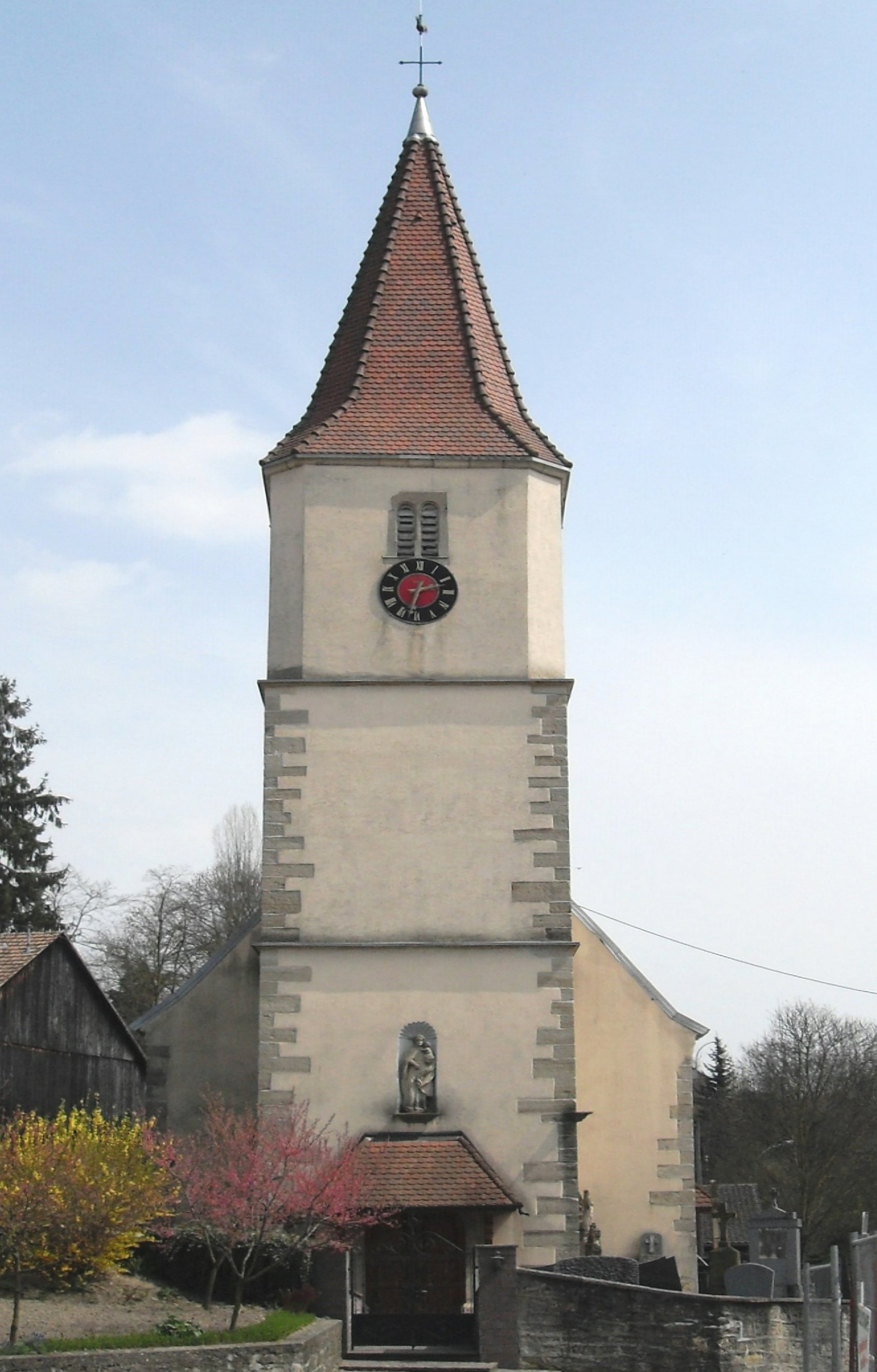
- The church in Franken

- Coat of arms
- Location of Franken
- Location within France Location within Grand Est
- Coordinates: 47°36′13″N 7°21′20″E
- Country: France
- Region: Grand Est
- Department: Haut-Rhin
- Arrondissement: Altkirch
- Canton: Altkirch

Government
  - Mayor (2023–2026): Raphael Schmidlin
- Area^{1}: 6.22 km^{2} (2.40 sq mi)
- Elevation: 335 m (1,099 ft)
- Highest elevation: 432 m (1,417 ft)
- Lowest elevation: 326 m (1,070 ft)
- Population (2023): 354
  - Density: 56.9/km^{2} (147/sq mi)
- Time zone: UTC+01:00 (CET)
  - Summer (DST): UTC+02:00 (CEST)
- INSEE/Postal code: 68096 /68130
- ^{1} French Land Register data, which excludes lakes, ponds, glaciers > 1 km^{2} (0.386 sq mi or 247 acres) and river estuaries.

Franken is a commune in the Haut-Rhin department in Alsace in north-eastern France.

== See also ==
- Communes of the Haut-Rhin département
