= Romagny, Haut-Rhin =

Commune in Grand Est, France

Romagny
- Commune
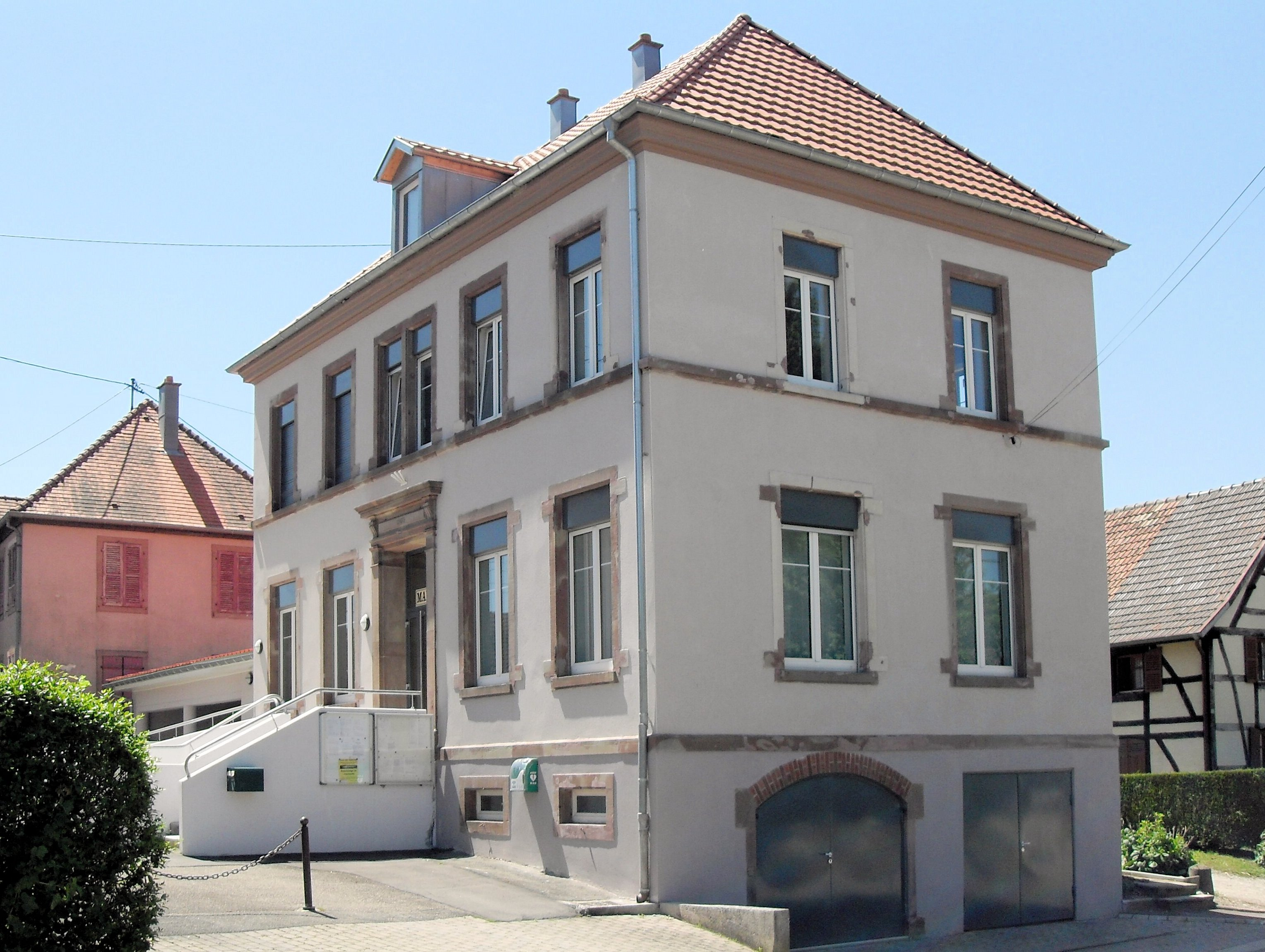
- The town hall in Romagny

- Coat of arms
- Location of Romagny
- Location within France Location within Grand Est
- Coordinates: 47°36′37″N 7°04′03″E
- Country: France
- Region: Grand Est
- Department: Haut-Rhin
- Arrondissement: Altkirch
- Canton: Masevaux-Niederbruck

Government
  - Mayor (2020–2026): Denis Lewek
- Area^{1}: 2.89 km^{2} (1.12 sq mi)
- Elevation: 360 m (1,180 ft)
- Highest elevation: 376 m (1,234 ft)
- Lowest elevation: 349 m (1,145 ft)
- Population (2023): 273
  - Density: 94.5/km^{2} (245/sq mi)
- Time zone: UTC+01:00 (CET)
  - Summer (DST): UTC+02:00 (CEST)
- INSEE/Postal code: 68282 /68210
- ^{1} French Land Register data, which excludes lakes, ponds, glaciers > 1 km^{2} (0.386 sq mi or 247 acres) and river estuaries.

Romagny (French pronunciation: [ʁɔmaɲi]; German: Willern; Alsatian: Romààni) is a commune in the Haut-Rhin department in Alsace in north-eastern France.

== See also ==
- Communes of the Haut-Rhin department
