= Bettlach, Haut-Rhin =

Commune in Grand Est, France

Bettlach
- Commune
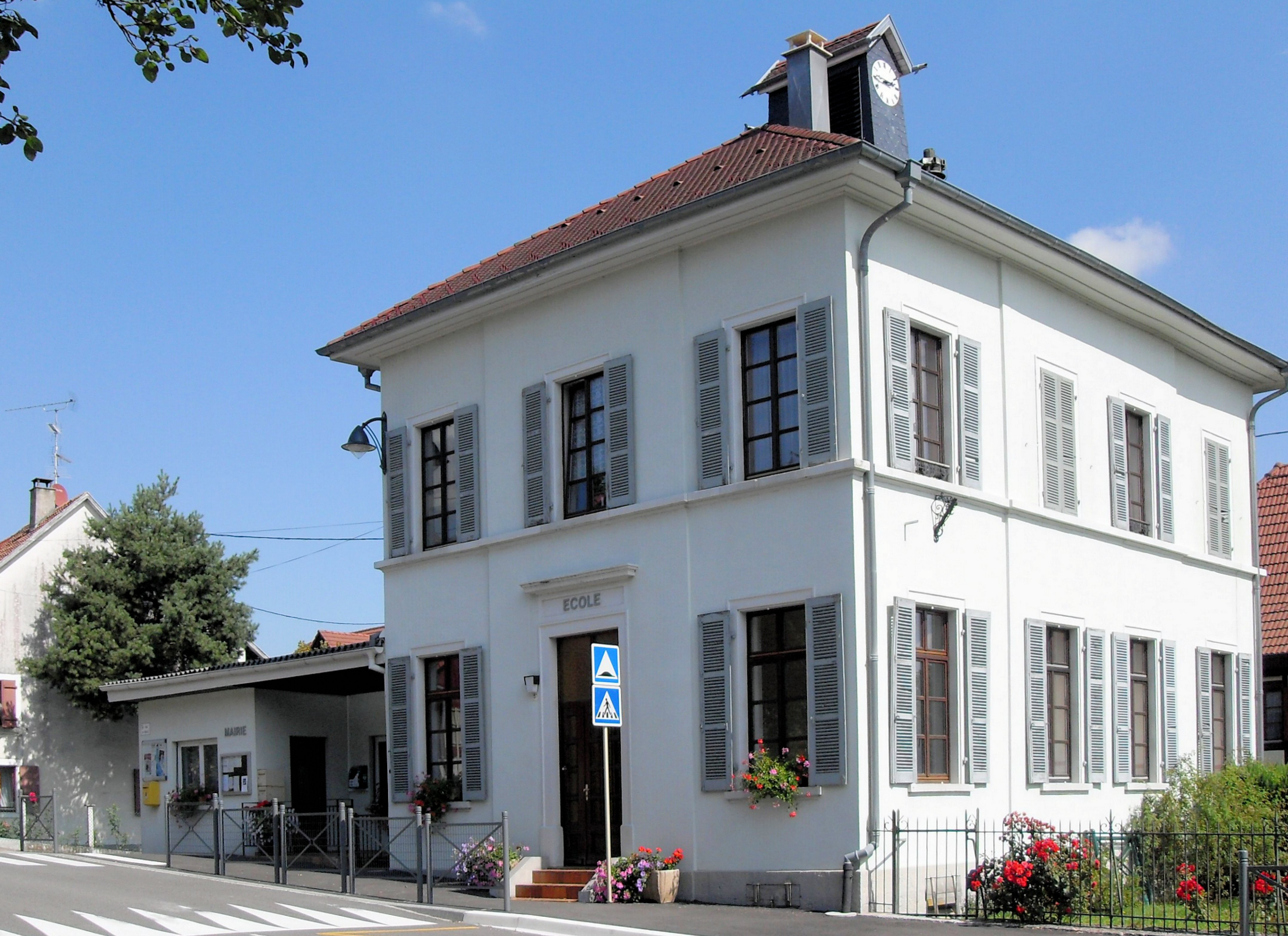
- The town hall and school in Bettlach

- Coat of arms
- Location of Bettlach
- Location within France Location within Grand Est
- Coordinates: 47°30′31″N 7°24′49″E
- Country: France
- Region: Grand Est
- Department: Haut-Rhin
- Arrondissement: Altkirch
- Canton: Altkirch
- Intercommunality: CC Sundgau

Government
  - Mayor (2020–2026): Anne-Marie Biancotti
- Area^{1}: 4.09 km^{2} (1.58 sq mi)
- Elevation: 450 m (1,480 ft)
- Highest elevation: 530 m (1,740 ft)
- Lowest elevation: 399 m (1,309 ft)
- Population (2023): 300
  - Density: 73/km^{2} (190/sq mi)
- Time zone: UTC+01:00 (CET)
  - Summer (DST): UTC+02:00 (CEST)
- INSEE/Postal code: 68034 /68480
- ^{1} French Land Register data, which excludes lakes, ponds, glaciers > 1 km^{2} (0.386 sq mi or 247 acres) and river estuaries.

Bettlach is a commune in the Haut-Rhin department and Grand Est region of north-eastern France.

== See also ==
- Communes of the Haut-Rhin department
