= Ballersdorf =

Commune in Grand Est, France

- Commune
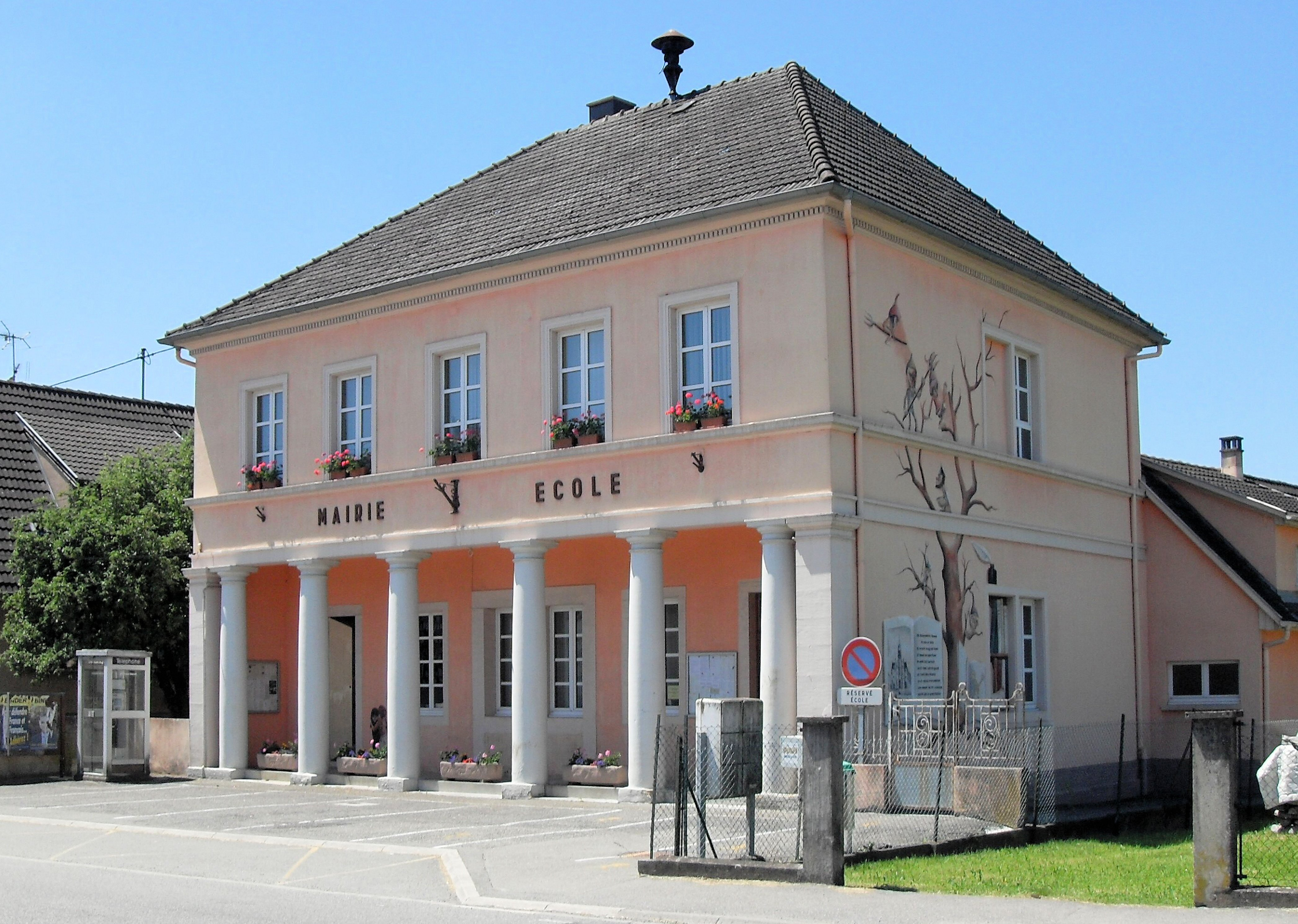
- The town hall and school in Ballersdorf

- Coat of arms
- Location of Ballersdorf
- Location within France Location within Grand Est
- Coordinates: 47°37′27″N 7°09′38″E
- Country: France
- Region: Grand Est
- Department: Haut-Rhin
- Arrondissement: Altkirch
- Canton: Masevaux-Niederbruck

Government
  - Mayor (2020–2026): Laurent Wiest
- Area^{1}: 10.72 km^{2} (4.14 sq mi)
- Elevation: 303 m (994 ft)
- Highest elevation: 387 m (1,270 ft)
- Lowest elevation: 292 m (958 ft)
- Population (2023): 818
  - Density: 76.3/km^{2} (198/sq mi)
- Time zone: UTC+01:00 (CET)
  - Summer (DST): UTC+02:00 (CEST)
- INSEE/Postal code: 68017 /68210
- ^{1} French Land Register data, which excludes lakes, ponds, glaciers > 1 km^{2} (0.386 sq mi or 247 acres) and river estuaries.

Ballersdorf is a commune in the Haut-Rhin department in Alsace in north-eastern France.

== See also ==
- Communes of the Haut-Rhin department
