= Retzwiller =

Commune in Grand Est, France

- Commune
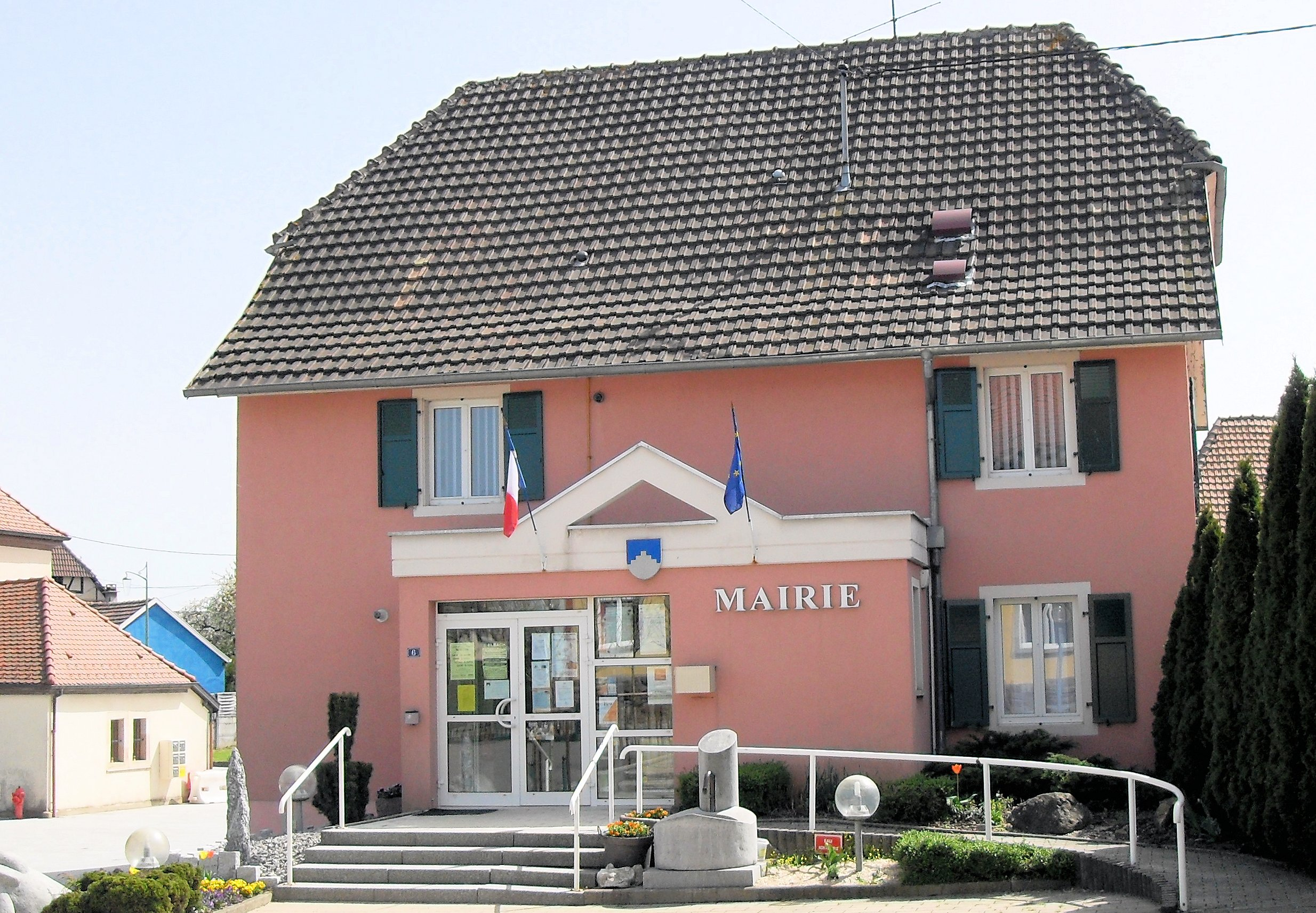
- The town hall in Retzwiller

- Coat of arms
- Location of Retzwiller
- Location within France Location within Grand Est
- Coordinates: 47°37′55″N 7°05′38″E
- Country: France
- Region: Grand Est
- Department: Haut-Rhin
- Arrondissement: Altkirch
- Canton: Masevaux-Niederbruck
- Intercommunality: Sud Alsace Largue

Government
  - Mayor (2020–2026): Franck Grandgirard
- Area^{1}: 4.1 km^{2} (1.6 sq mi)
- Elevation: 315 m (1,033 ft)
- Highest elevation: 392 m (1,286 ft)
- Lowest elevation: 302 m (991 ft)
- Population (2023): 689
  - Density: 170/km^{2} (440/sq mi)
- Time zone: UTC+01:00 (CET)
  - Summer (DST): UTC+02:00 (CEST)
- INSEE/Postal code: 68268 /68210
- ^{1} French Land Register data, which excludes lakes, ponds, glaciers > 1 km^{2} (0.386 sq mi or 247 acres) and river estuaries.

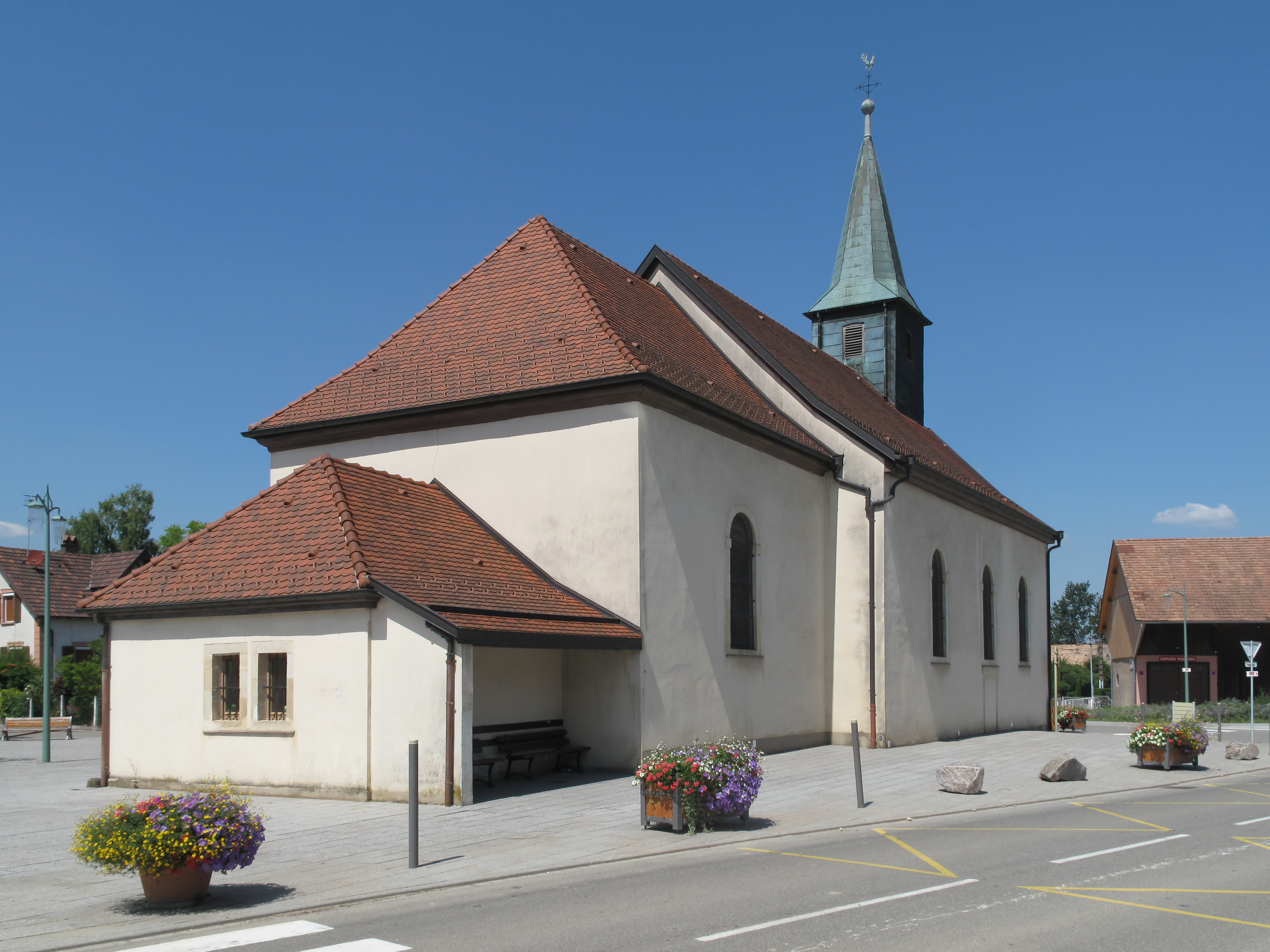
Church: l'église Saint-Antoine

Retzwiller (French pronunciation: [ʁɛtsvilɛʁ]; German: Retzweiler) is a commune in the Haut-Rhin department in Alsace in north-eastern France.

== Population ==
Historical population
Year	Pop.	±% p.a.
1968	655	—
1975	512	−3.46%
1982	538	+0.71%
1990	538	+0.00%
1999	583	+0.90%
2007	650	+1.37%
2012	634	−0.50%
2017	709	+2.26%
2023	689	−0.48%
Source: INSEE

== See also ==
- Communes of the Haut-Rhin department
