= Feldbach, Haut-Rhin =

Feldbach
- Commune
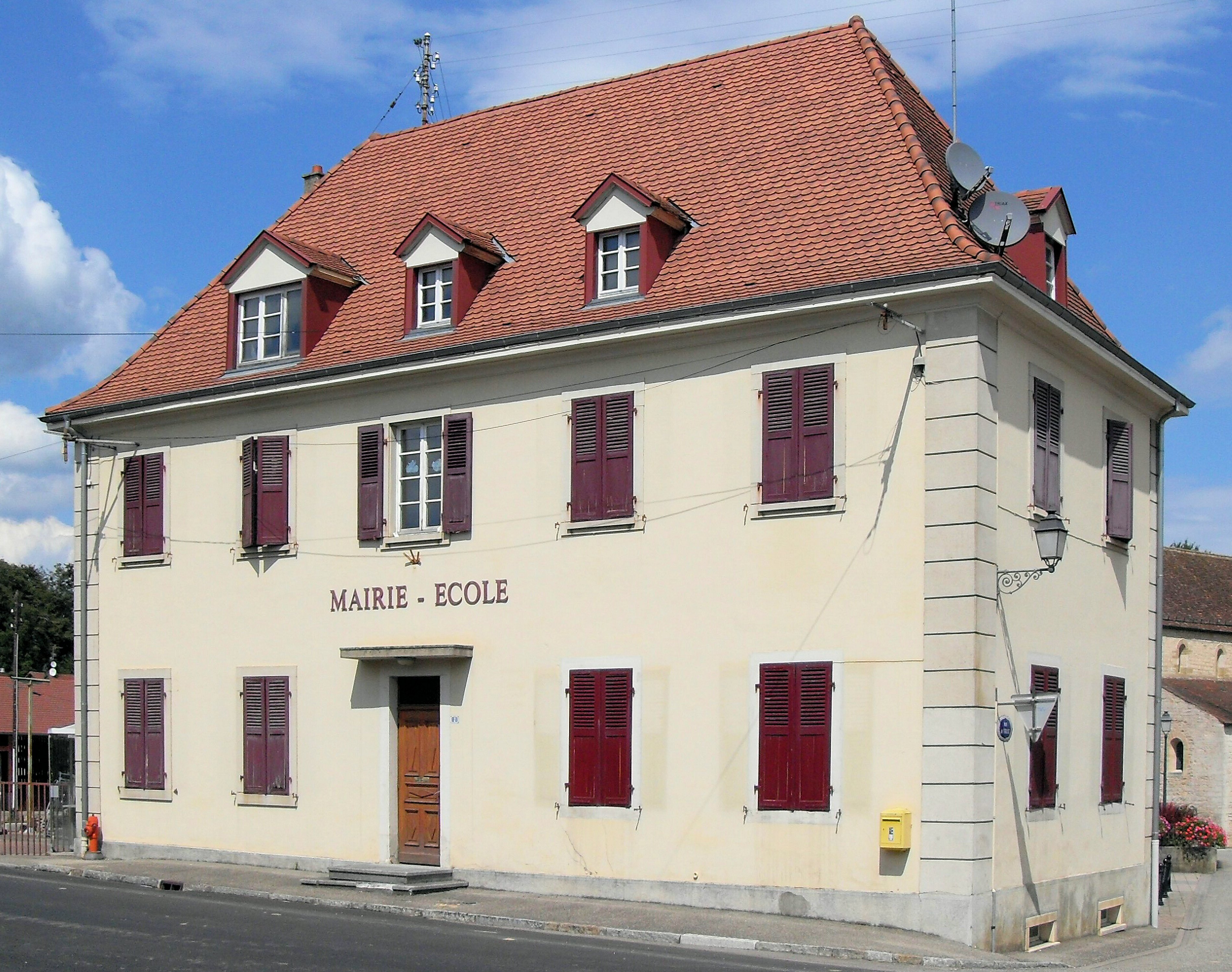
- The town hall and school in Feldbach

- Coat of arms
- Location of Feldbach
- Location within France Location within Grand Est
- Coordinates: 47°32′11″N 7°15′54″E
- Country: France
- Region: Grand Est
- Department: Haut-Rhin
- Arrondissement: Altkirch
- Canton: Altkirch
- Intercommunality: Sundgau

Government
  - Mayor (2020–2026): Sylvie Renger
- Area^{1}: 5.02 km^{2} (1.94 sq mi)
- Elevation: 380 m (1,250 ft)
- Highest elevation: 438 m (1,437 ft)
- Lowest elevation: 385 m (1,263 ft)
- Population (2023): 472
  - Density: 94.0/km^{2} (244/sq mi)
- Time zone: UTC+01:00 (CET)
  - Summer (DST): UTC+02:00 (CEST)
- INSEE/Postal code: 68087 /68640
- ^{1} French Land Register data, which excludes lakes, ponds, glaciers > 1 km^{2} (0.386 sq mi or 247 acres) and river estuaries.

Feldbach (French pronunciation: [fɛldbak]) is a commune in the Haut-Rhin department in Alsace in north-eastern France.

== See also ==
- Communes of the Haut-Rhin département
