= Canton of Neuf-Brisach =

Coordinates: 48.0167°N 7.5333°E

Neuf-Brisach
- Former canton
- Interactive map of Neuf-Brisach
- Country: France
- Region: Grand Est
- Department: Haut-Rhin
- No. of communes: {{{nbcomm}}}
- Disbanded: 2015
- Area: 157.04 km^{2} (60.63 sq mi)
- Population (2012): 17,149
  - Density: 109.20/km^{2} (282.83/sq mi)

Neuf-Brisach is a French former canton in the arrondissement of Colmar in the département Haut-Rhin, Alsace. It had 17,149 inhabitants (2012). It was disbanded following the French canton reorganisation which came into effect in March 2015. It consisted of 16 communes, which joined the canton of Ensisheim in 2015.

The canton comprised the following communes:

- Algolsheim
- Appenwihr
- Balgau
- Biesheim
- Dessenheim
- Geiswasser
- Heiteren
- Hettenschlag
- Logelheim
- Nambsheim
- Neuf-Brisach (seat)
- Obersaasheim
- Vogelgrun
- Volgelsheim
- Weckolsheim
- Wolfgantzen
