= Durrenentzen =

Commune in Grand Est, France

- Commune
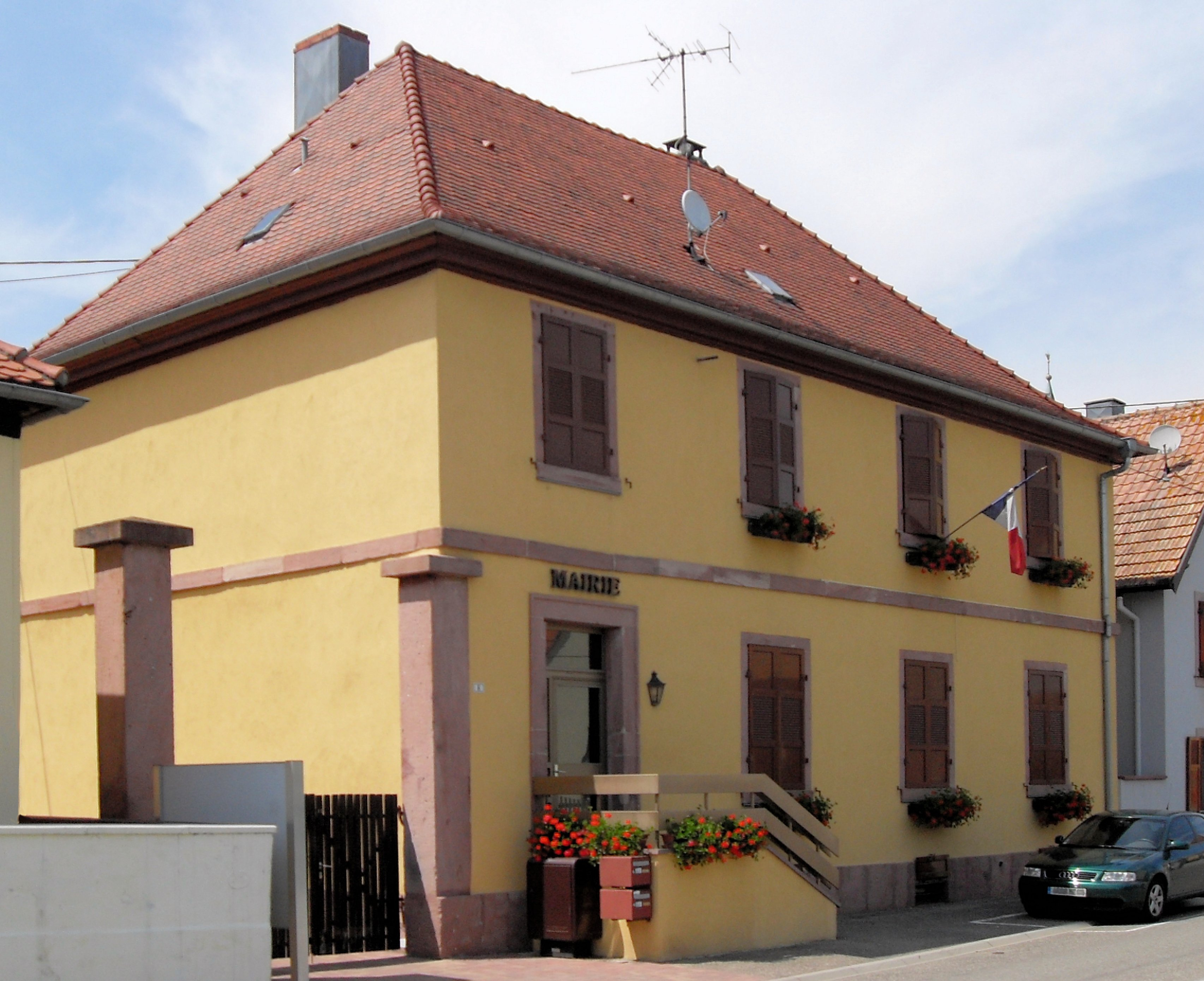
- The town hall in Durrenentzen

- Coat of arms
- Location of Durrenentzen
- Location within France Location within Grand Est
- Coordinates: 48°05′36″N 7°30′13″E
- Country: France
- Region: Grand Est
- Department: Haut-Rhin
- Arrondissement: Colmar-Ribeauvillé
- Canton: Ensisheim

Government
  - Mayor (2020–2026): Paul Bass
- Area^{1}: 6.22 km^{2} (2.40 sq mi)
- Elevation: 186 m (610 ft)
- Highest elevation: 190 m (620 ft)
- Lowest elevation: 180 m (590 ft)
- Population (2023): 1,062
  - Density: 171/km^{2} (442/sq mi)
- Time zone: UTC+01:00 (CET)
  - Summer (DST): UTC+02:00 (CEST)
- INSEE/Postal code: 68076 /68320
- ^{1} French Land Register data, which excludes lakes, ponds, glaciers > 1 km^{2} (0.386 sq mi or 247 acres) and river estuaries.

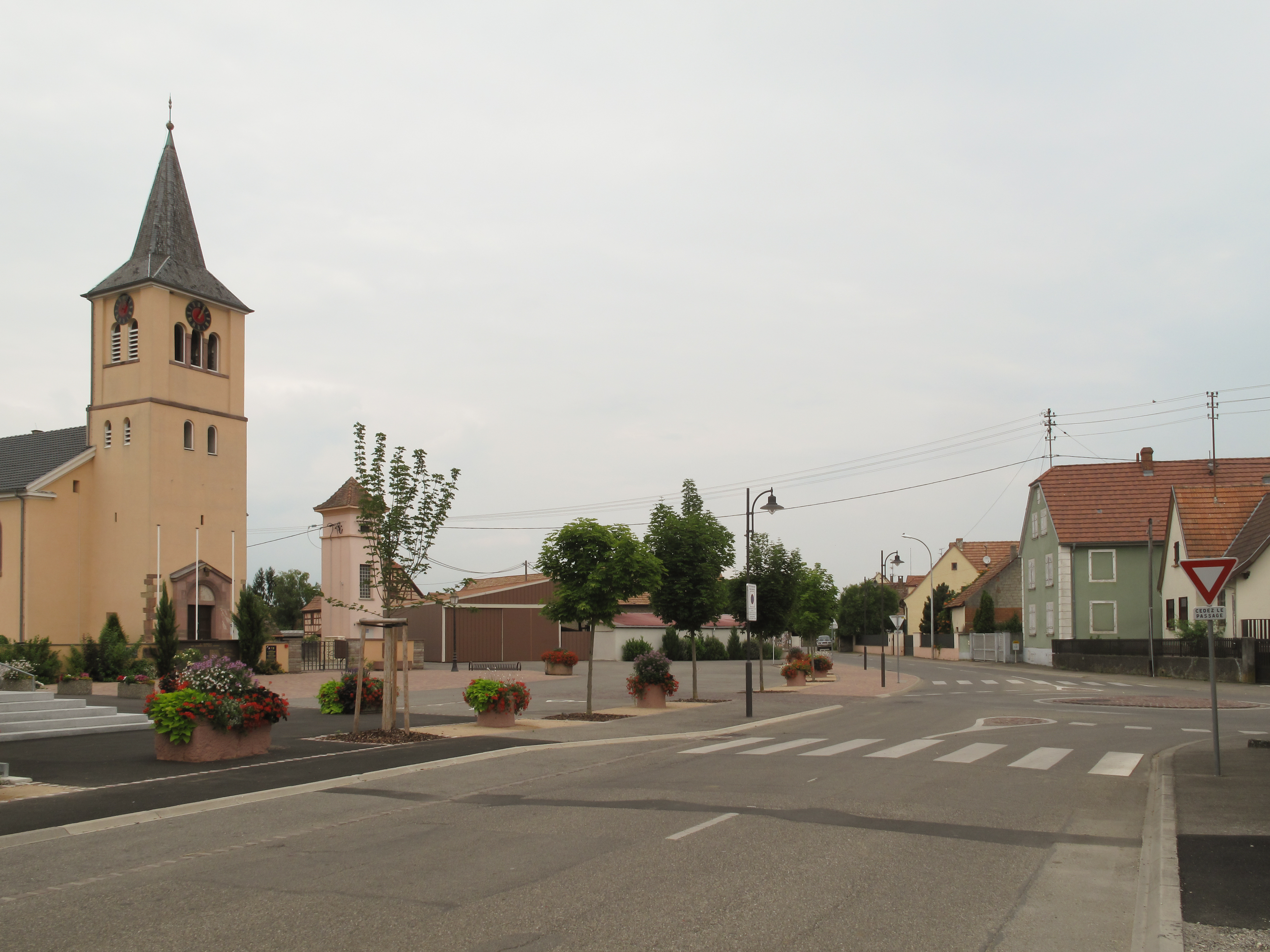
Durrenentzen, church (l'église Saint-Blaise) in the street

Durrenentzen (French pronunciation: [dyʁənɛntsən]; German: Dürrenentzen) is a commune in the Haut-Rhin department in Grand Est in north-eastern France.

== See also ==
- Communes of the Haut-Rhin department
