= Munwiller =

Commune in Grand Est, France

- Commune
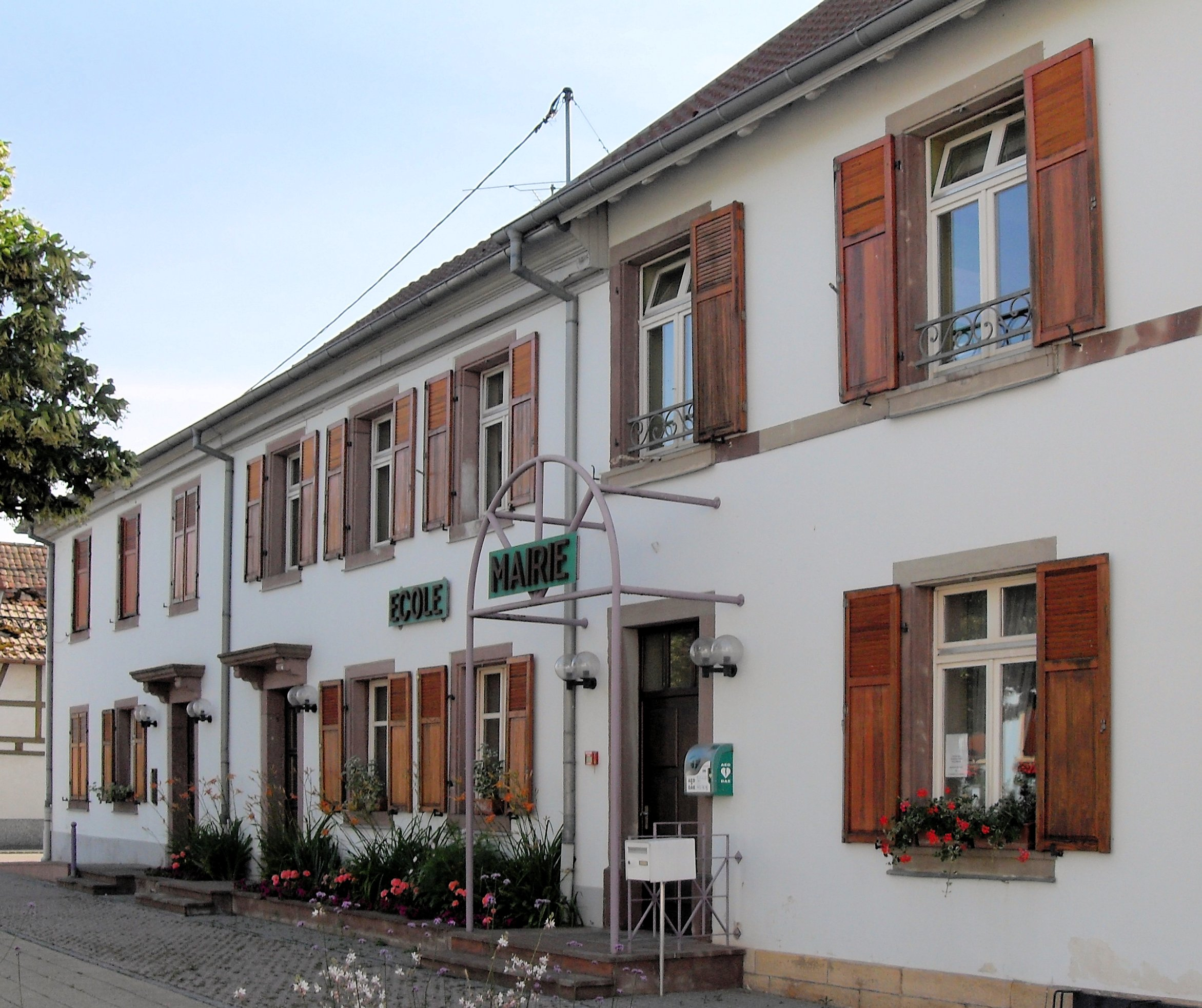
- The town hall and school in Munwiller

- Coat of arms
- Location of Munwiller
- Location within France Location within Grand Est
- Coordinates: 47°55′53″N 7°20′45″E
- Country: France
- Region: Grand Est
- Department: Haut-Rhin
- Arrondissement: Thann-Guebwiller
- Canton: Ensisheim
- Intercommunality: Centre Haut-Rhin

Government
  - Mayor (2020–2026): Léonard Reymann
- Area^{1}: 6.74 km^{2} (2.60 sq mi)
- Elevation: 206 m (676 ft)
- Highest elevation: 209 m (686 ft)
- Lowest elevation: 203 m (666 ft)
- Population (2023): 461
  - Density: 68.4/km^{2} (177/sq mi)
- Time zone: UTC+01:00 (CET)
  - Summer (DST): UTC+02:00 (CEST)
- INSEE/Postal code: 68228 /68250
- ^{1} French Land Register data, which excludes lakes, ponds, glaciers > 1 km^{2} (0.386 sq mi or 247 acres) and river estuaries.

Munwiller (German: Munweiler) is a commune in the Haut-Rhin department in Grand Est in north-eastern France.

== See also ==
- Communes of the Haut-Rhin département
