= Oberentzen =

Commune in Grand Est, France

- Commune
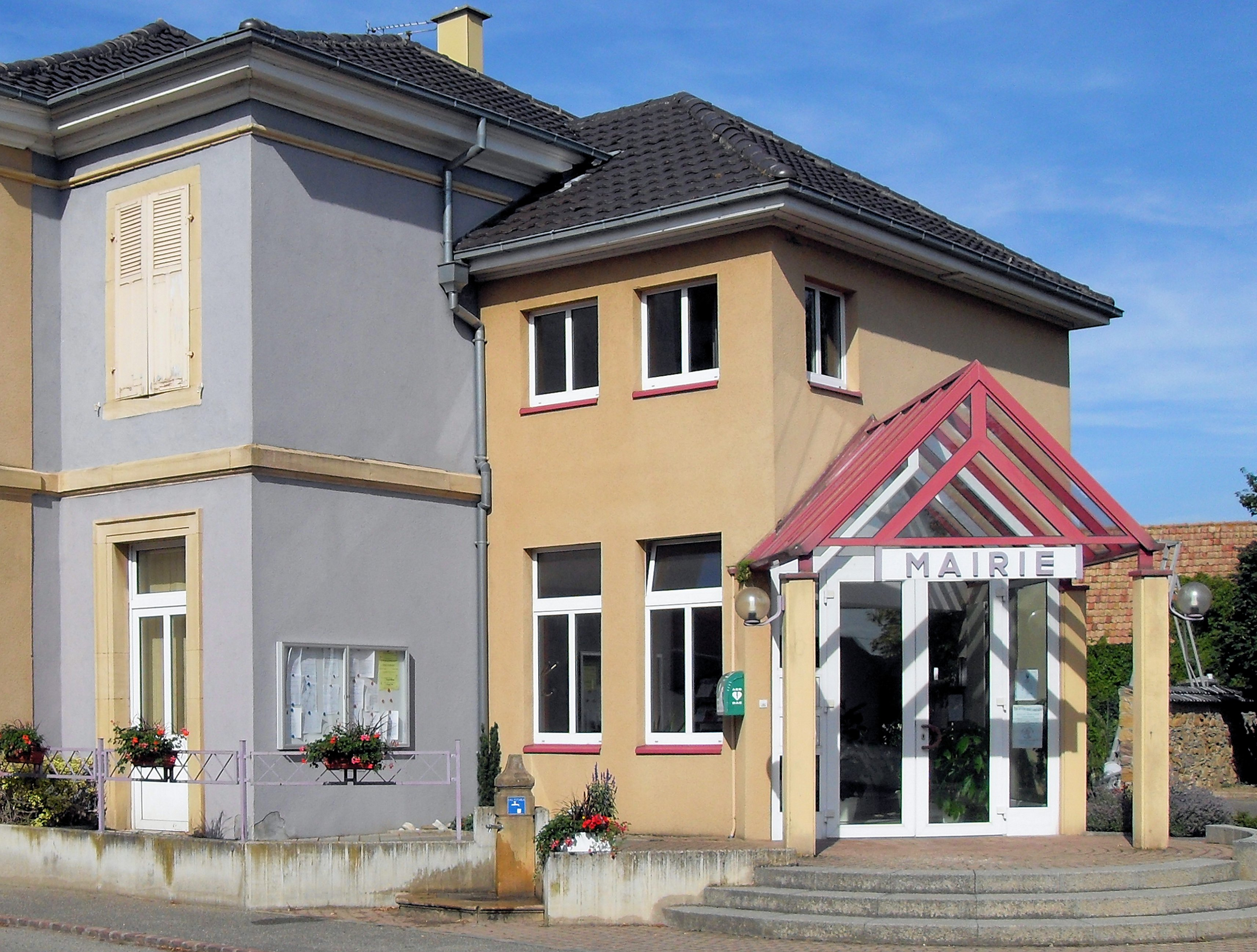
- The town hall in Oberentzen

- Coat of arms
- Location of Oberentzen
- Location within France Location within Grand Est
- Coordinates: 47°56′38″N 7°22′42″E
- Country: France
- Region: Grand Est
- Department: Haut-Rhin
- Arrondissement: Thann-Guebwiller
- Canton: Ensisheim
- Intercommunality: Centre Haut-Rhin

Government
  - Mayor (2020–2026): René Mathias
- Area^{1}: 8.81 km^{2} (3.40 sq mi)
- Elevation: 204 m (669 ft)
- Highest elevation: 211 m (692 ft)
- Lowest elevation: 201 m (659 ft)
- Population (2023): 723
  - Density: 82.1/km^{2} (213/sq mi)
- Time zone: UTC+01:00 (CET)
  - Summer (DST): UTC+02:00 (CEST)
- INSEE/Postal code: 68241 /68127
- ^{1} French Land Register data, which excludes lakes, ponds, glaciers > 1 km^{2} (0.386 sq mi or 247 acres) and river estuaries.

Oberentzen (German: Oberenzen; Alsatian: Owweranze) is a commune in the Haut-Rhin department in Grand Est in north-eastern France.

== Population ==
Historical population
Year	Pop.	±% p.a.
1968	428	—
1975	455	+0.88%
1982	509	+1.62%
1990	536	+0.65%
1999	511	−0.53%
2007	525	+0.34%
2012	579	+1.98%
2017	637	+1.93%
2023	723	+2.13%
Source: INSEE

== See also ==
- Communes of the Haut-Rhin department
