= Niederhergheim =

Commune in Grand Est, France

- Commune
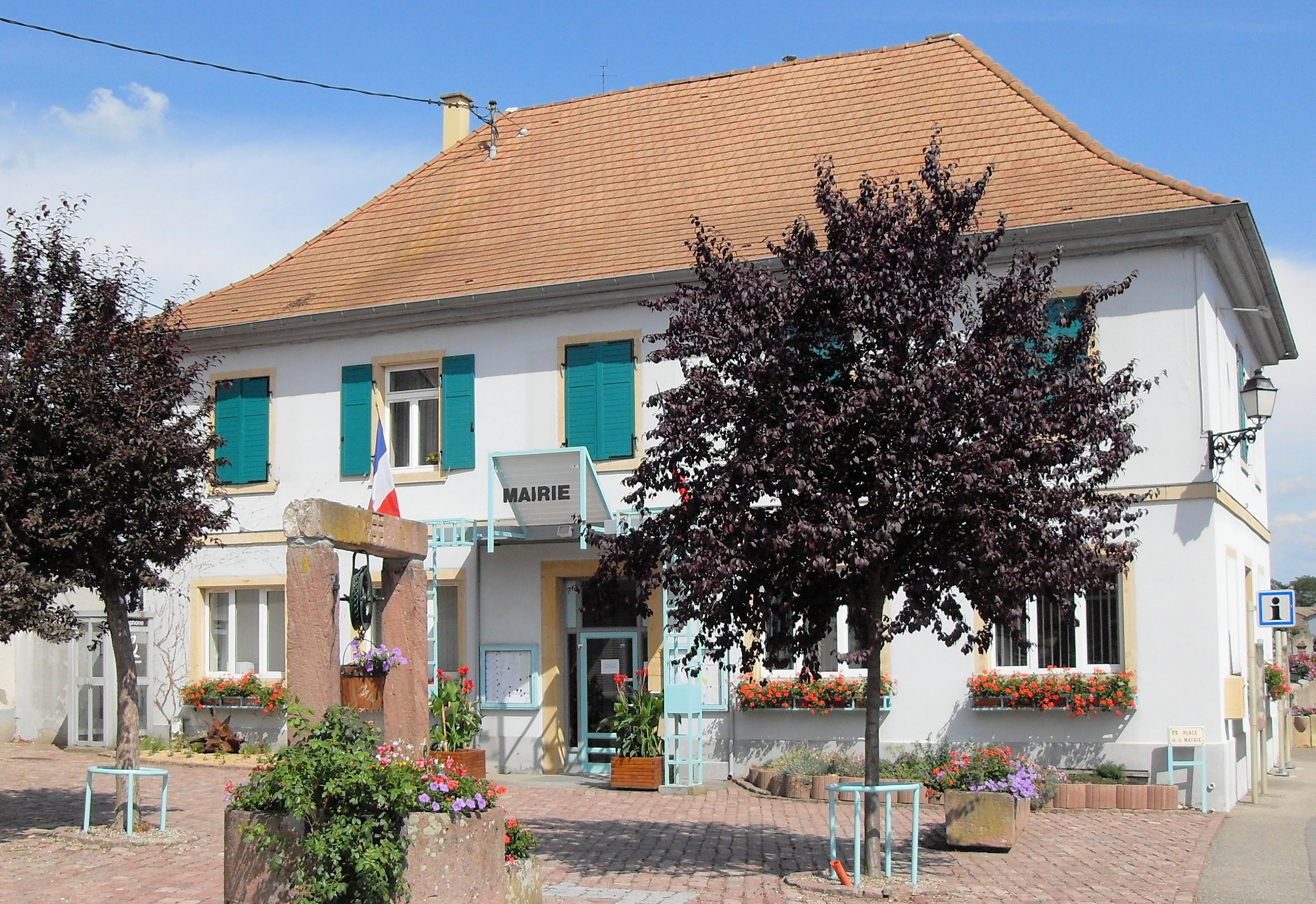
- The town hall in Niederhergheim

- Coat of arms
- Location of Niederhergheim
- Location within France Location within Grand Est
- Coordinates: 47°59′08″N 7°24′00″E
- Country: France
- Region: Grand Est
- Department: Haut-Rhin
- Arrondissement: Thann-Guebwiller
- Canton: Ensisheim
- Intercommunality: Centre Haut-Rhin

Government
  - Mayor (2020–2026): Alain Zemb
- Area^{1}: 12.51 km^{2} (4.83 sq mi)
- Elevation: 200 m (660 ft)
- Highest elevation: 202 m (663 ft)
- Lowest elevation: 194 m (636 ft)
- Population (2023): 1,176
  - Density: 94.00/km^{2} (243.5/sq mi)
- Time zone: UTC+01:00 (CET)
  - Summer (DST): UTC+02:00 (CEST)
- INSEE/Postal code: 68235 /68127
- ^{1} French Land Register data, which excludes lakes, ponds, glaciers > 1 km^{2} (0.386 sq mi or 247 acres) and river estuaries.

Niederhergheim is a commune in the Haut-Rhin department in Grand Est in north-eastern France.

== See also ==
- Communes of the Haut-Rhin department
