= Kunheim =

Commune in Grand Est, France

- Commune
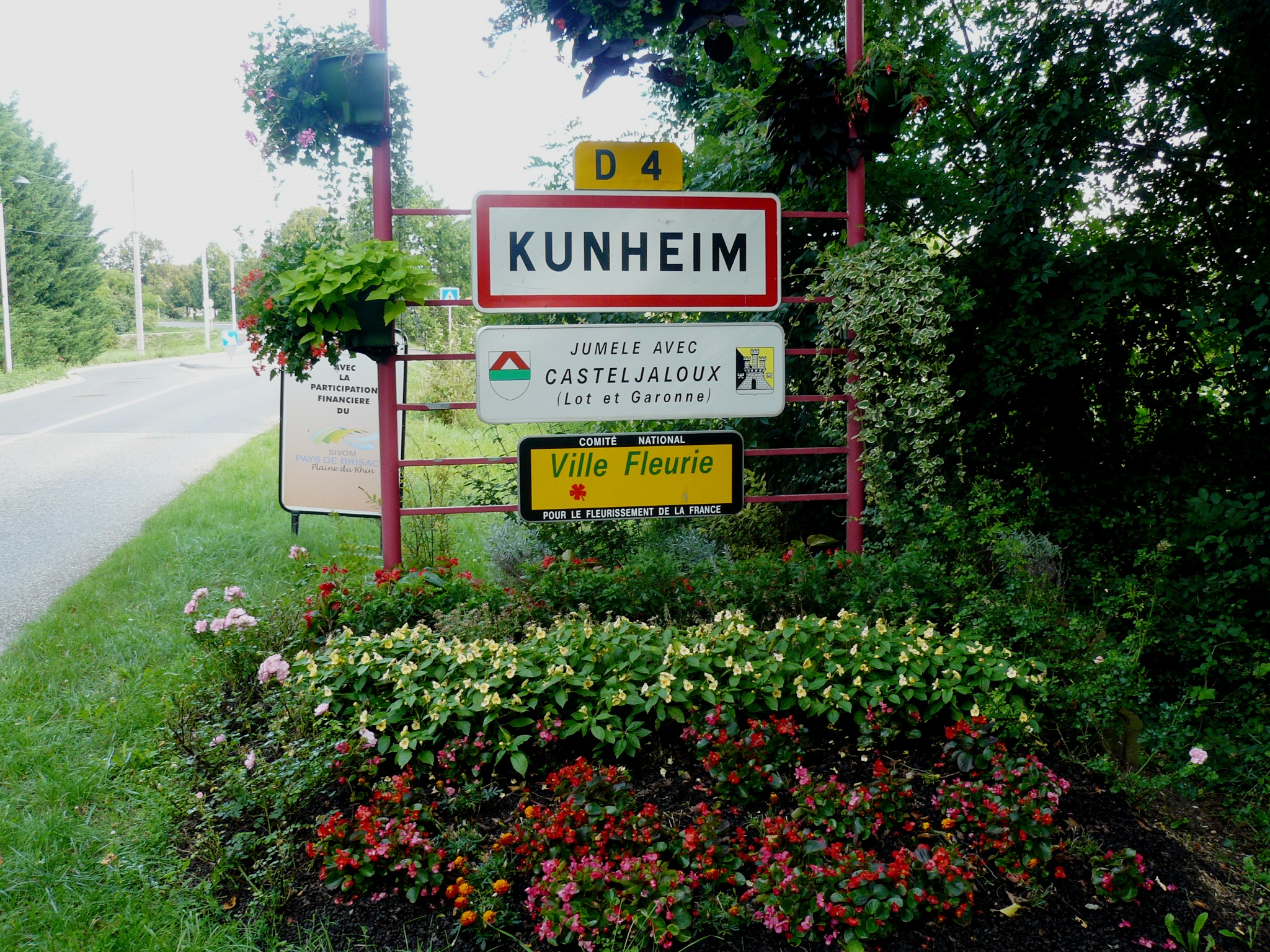
- The road into Kunheim

- Coat of arms
- Location of Kunheim
- Location within France Location within Grand Est
- Coordinates: 48°04′37″N 7°32′06″E
- Country: France
- Region: Grand Est
- Department: Haut-Rhin
- Arrondissement: Colmar-Ribeauvillé
- Canton: Ensisheim
- Intercommunality: CC Alsace Rhin Brisach

Government
  - Mayor (2020–2026): Jill Köppe-Ritzenthaler
- Area^{1}: 11.75 km^{2} (4.54 sq mi)
- Elevation: 187 m (614 ft)
- Highest elevation: 190 m (620 ft)
- Lowest elevation: 181 m (594 ft)
- Population (2023): 1,822
  - Density: 155.1/km^{2} (401.6/sq mi)
- Time zone: UTC+01:00 (CET)
  - Summer (DST): UTC+02:00 (CEST)
- INSEE/Postal code: 68172 /68320
- ^{1} French Land Register data, which excludes lakes, ponds, glaciers > 1 km^{2} (0.386 sq mi or 247 acres) and river estuaries.

Kunheim (French pronunciation: [kynaim]; German: Künheim) is a commune in the Haut-Rhin department in Grand Est in north-eastern France.

== See also ==
- Communes of the Haut-Rhin département
