= Réguisheim =

Commune in Grand Est, France

- Commune
- The town hall in Réguisheim

- Coat of arms
- Location of Réguisheim
- Location within France Location within Grand Est
- Coordinates: 47°53′52″N 7°21′24″E
- Country: France
- Region: Grand Est
- Department: Haut-Rhin
- Arrondissement: Thann-Guebwiller
- Canton: Ensisheim
- Intercommunality: Centre Haut-Rhin

Government
  - Mayor (2020–2026): Frank Paulus
- Area^{1}: 23.87 km^{2} (9.22 sq mi)
- Elevation: 212 m (696 ft)
- Highest elevation: 219 m (719 ft)
- Lowest elevation: 209 m (686 ft)
- Population (2023): 2,011
  - Density: 84.25/km^{2} (218.2/sq mi)
- Time zone: UTC+01:00 (CET)
  - Summer (DST): UTC+02:00 (CEST)
- INSEE/Postal code: 68266 /68890
- ^{1} French Land Register data, which excludes lakes, ponds, glaciers > 1 km^{2} (0.386 sq mi or 247 acres) and river estuaries.

Réguisheim (French pronunciation: [ʁegisaim]; German: Regisheim) is a commune in the Haut-Rhin department in Grand Est in north-eastern France.

== Population ==
Historical population
Year	Pop.	±% p.a.
1968	1,239	—
1975	1,304	+0.73%
1982	1,612	+3.08%
1990	1,536	−0.60%
1999	1,660	+0.87%
2007	1,736	+0.56%
2012	1,810	+0.84%
2017	1,895	+0.92%
2023	2,011	+1.00%
Source: INSEE

== See also ==
- Communes of the Haut-Rhin department
