= Artzenheim =

Commune in Grand Est, France

- Commune
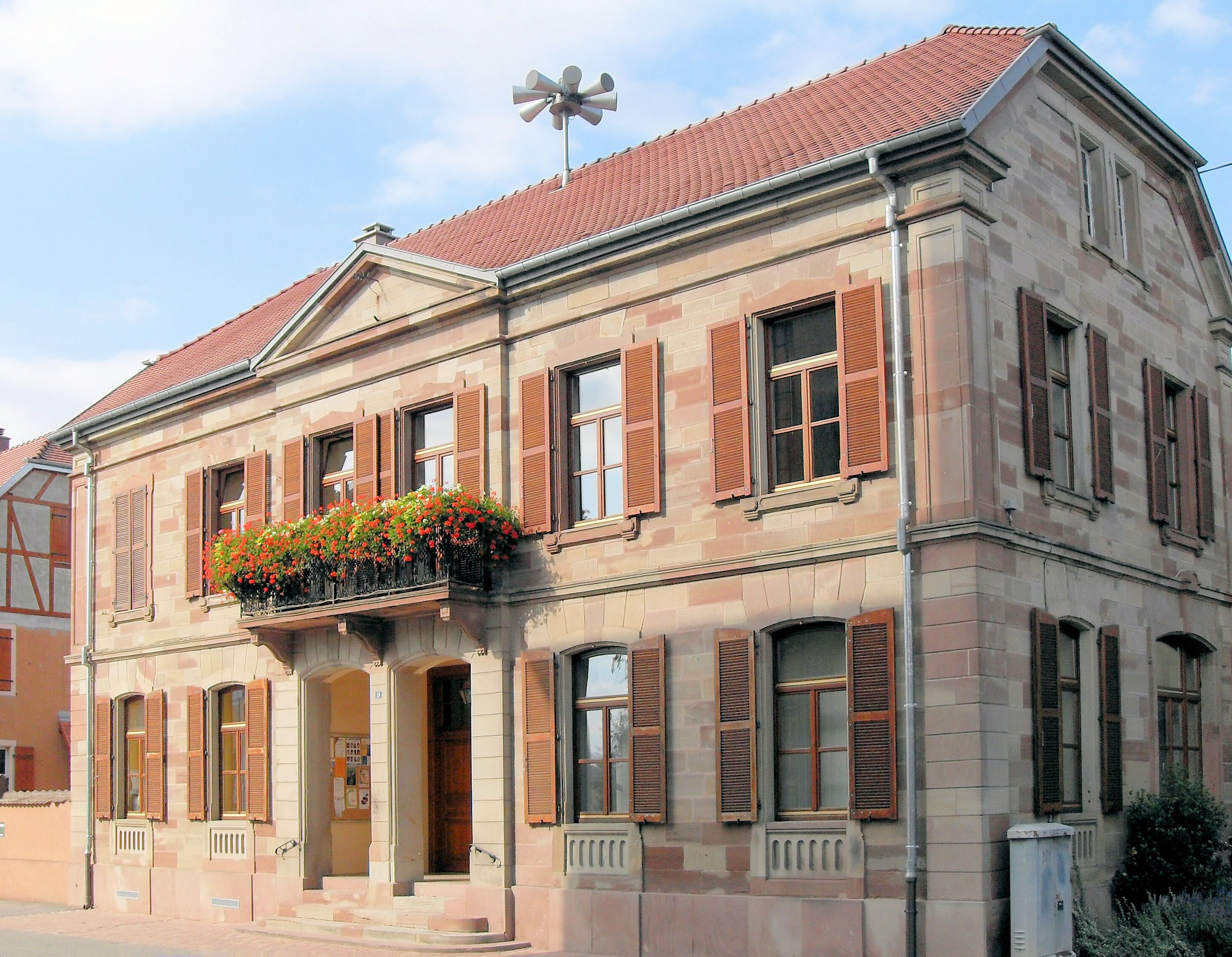
- The town hall in Artzenheim

- Coat of arms
- Location of Artzenheim
- Location within France Location within Grand Est
- Coordinates: 48°07′N 7°32′E
- Country: France
- Region: Grand Est
- Department: Haut-Rhin
- Arrondissement: Colmar-Ribeauvillé
- Canton: Ensisheim
- Intercommunality: CC Alsace Rhin Brisach

Government
  - Mayor (2020–2026): Claude Gebhard
- Area^{1}: 9.69 km^{2} (3.74 sq mi)
- Elevation: 183 m (600 ft)
- Highest elevation: 186 m (610 ft)
- Lowest elevation: 177 m (581 ft)
- Population (2023): 857
  - Density: 88.4/km^{2} (229/sq mi)
- Time zone: UTC+01:00 (CET)
  - Summer (DST): UTC+02:00 (CEST)
- INSEE/Postal code: 68009 /68320
- ^{1} French Land Register data, which excludes lakes, ponds, glaciers > 1 km^{2} (0.386 sq mi or 247 acres) and river estuaries.

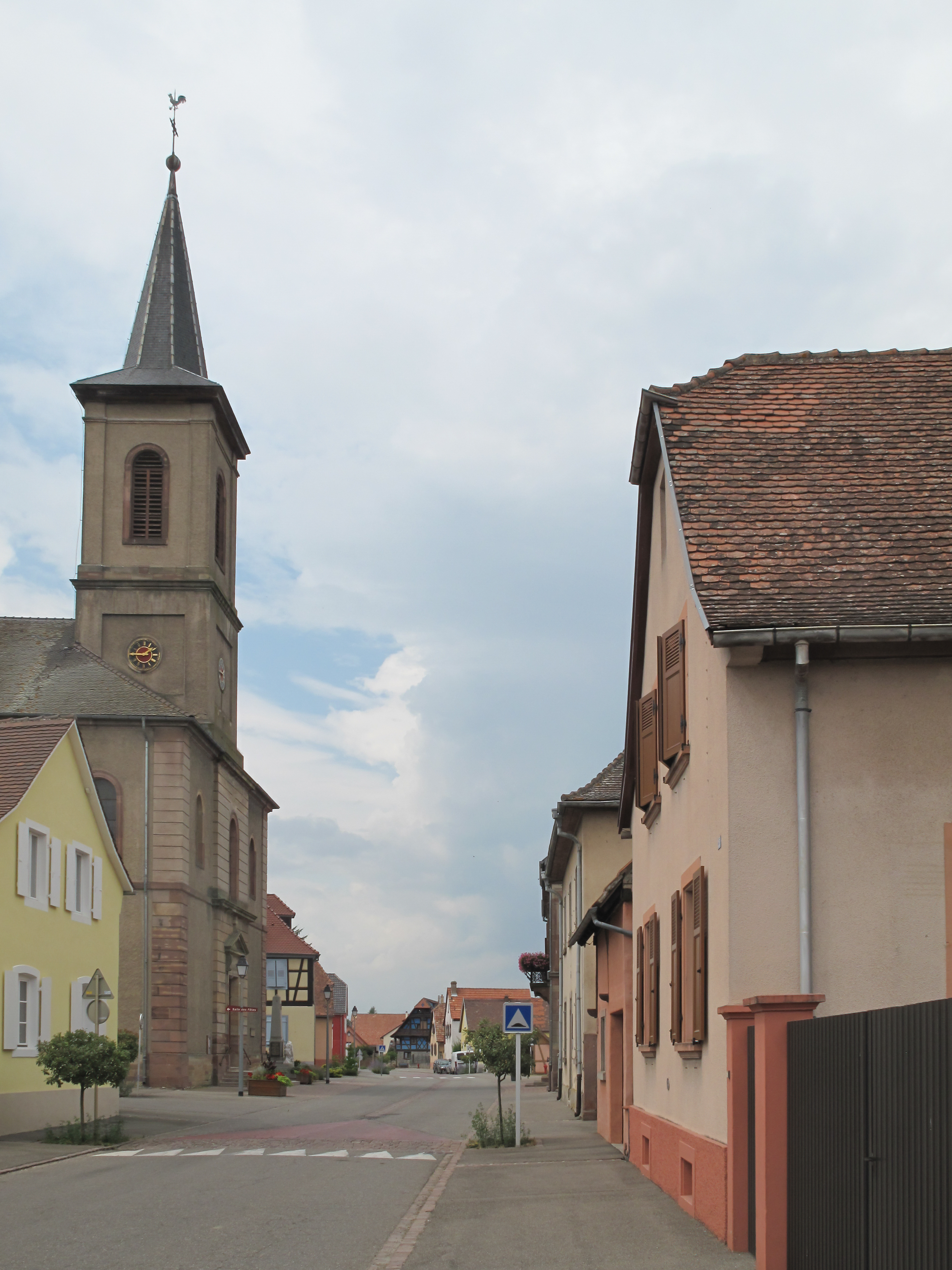
Artzenheim, church (l'église Saint-Jacques) in the street

Artzenheim (French pronunciation: [aʁtsənaim]; German: Arzenheim; Alsatian: Aarze) is a commune in the Haut-Rhin department in Grand Est in north-eastern France.

== See also ==
- Communes of the Haut-Rhin department
