= Rustenhart =

Commune in Grand Est, France

- Commune
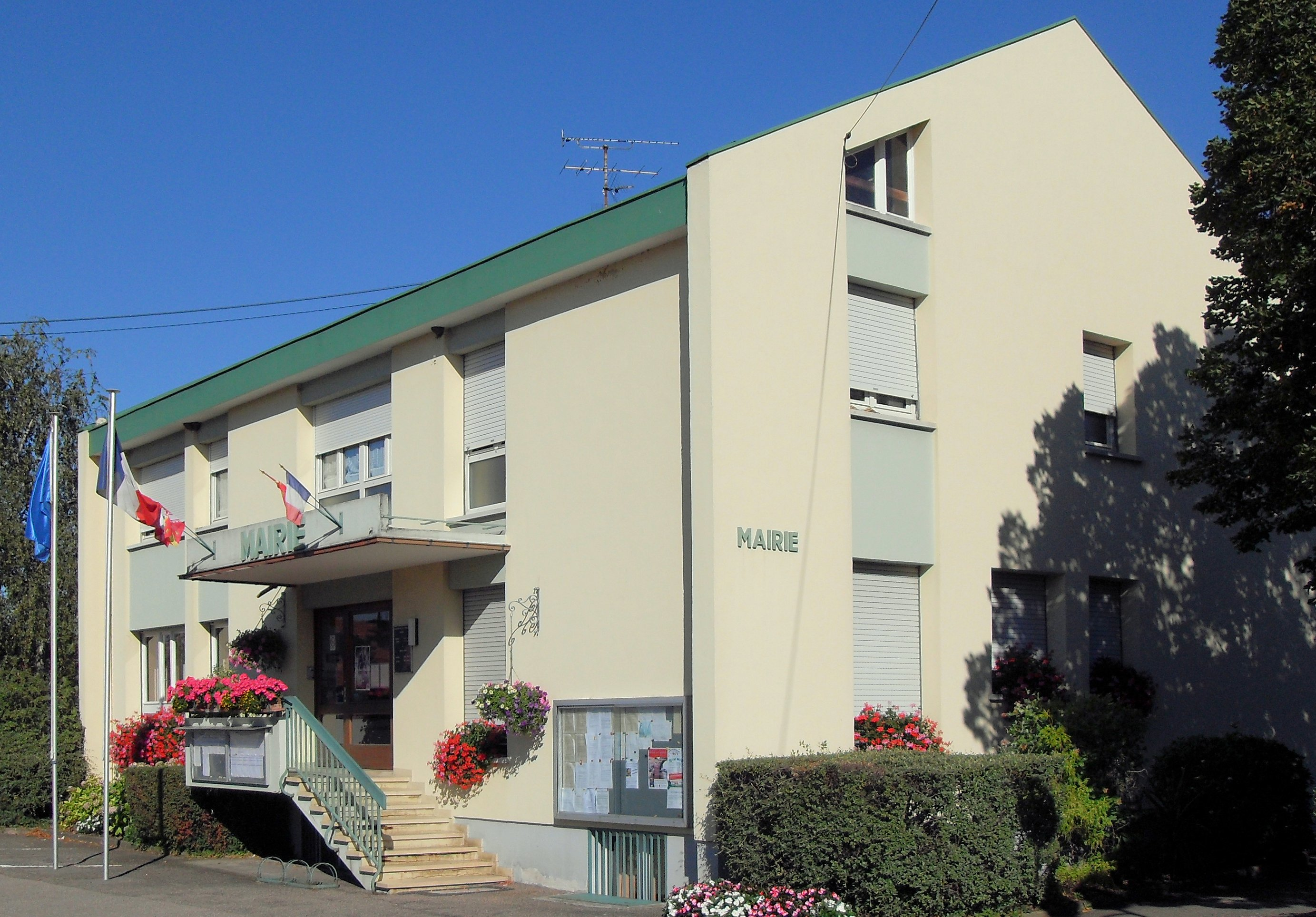
- The town hall in Rustenhart

- Coat of arms
- Location of Rustenhart
- Location within France Location within Grand Est
- Coordinates: 47°56′33″N 7°27′43″E
- Country: France
- Region: Grand Est
- Department: Haut-Rhin
- Arrondissement: Colmar-Ribeauvillé
- Canton: Ensisheim

Government
  - Mayor (2020–2026): Frédéric Giudici
- Area^{1}: 12.22 km^{2} (4.72 sq mi)
- Highest elevation: 210 m (690 ft)
- Lowest elevation: 203 m (666 ft)
- Population (2023): 1,001
  - Density: 81.91/km^{2} (212.2/sq mi)
- Time zone: UTC+01:00 (CET)
  - Summer (DST): UTC+02:00 (CEST)
- INSEE/Postal code: 68290 /68740
- ^{1} French Land Register data, which excludes lakes, ponds, glaciers > 1 km^{2} (0.386 sq mi or 247 acres) and river estuaries.

Rustenhart (German: Rüstenhart) is a commune in the Haut-Rhin department in Grand Est in north-eastern France.

== See also ==
- Communes of the Haut-Rhin department
