= Urschenheim =

Commune in Grand Est, France

Urschenheim Ürsche
- Commune
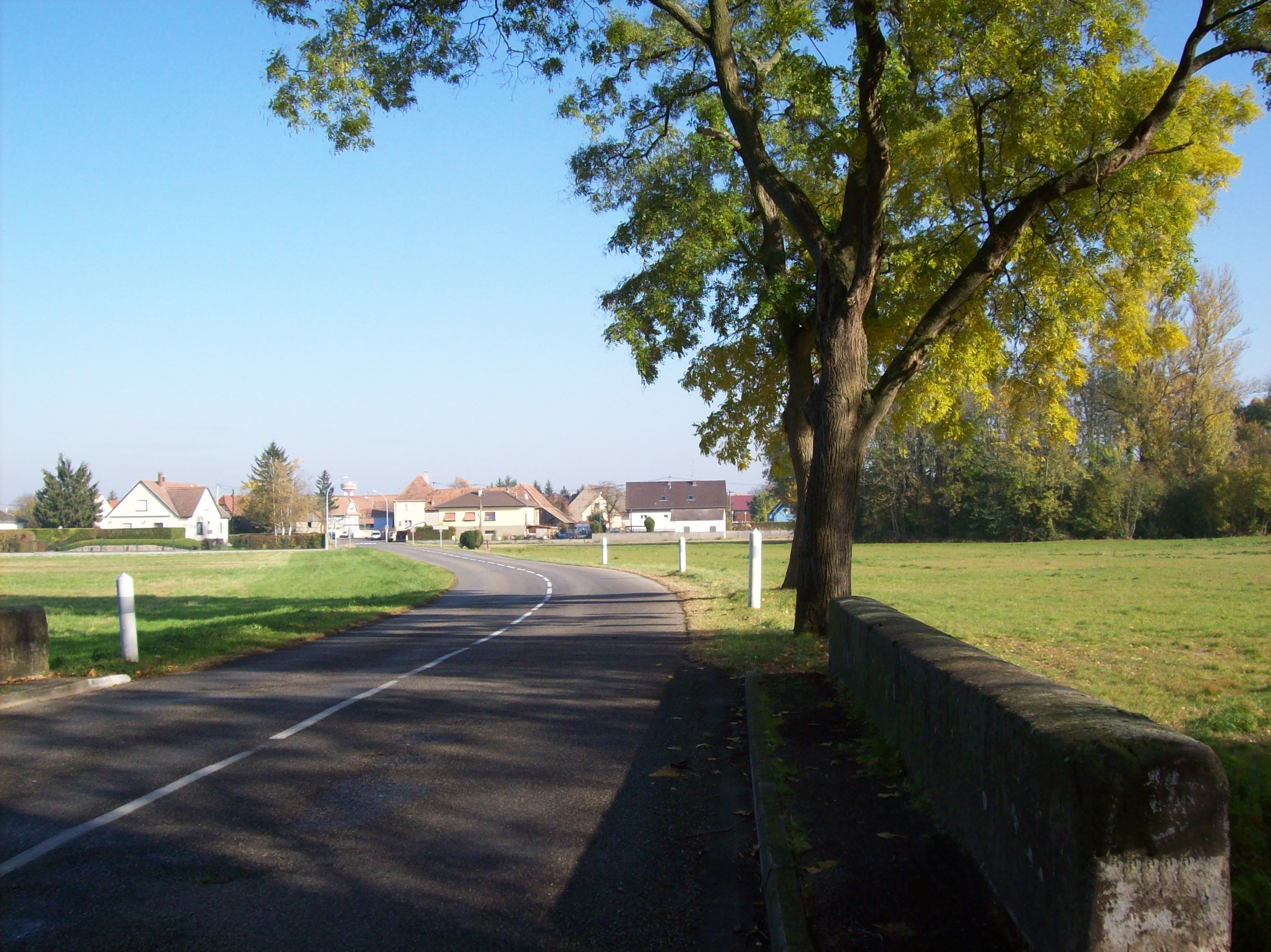
- The road into Urschenheim

- Coat of arms
- Location of Urschenheim
- Location within France Location within Grand Est
- Coordinates: 48°05′13″N 7°29′13″E
- Country: France
- Region: Grand Est
- Department: Haut-Rhin
- Arrondissement: Colmar-Ribeauvillé
- Canton: Ensisheim
- Intercommunality: CC Alsace Rhin Brisach

Government
  - Mayor (2020–2026): Robert Kohler
- Area^{1}: 6.42 km^{2} (2.48 sq mi)
- Elevation: 185 m (607 ft)
- Highest elevation: 190 m (620 ft)
- Lowest elevation: 185 m (607 ft)
- Population (2023): 808
  - Density: 126/km^{2} (326/sq mi)
- Time zone: UTC+01:00 (CET)
  - Summer (DST): UTC+02:00 (CEST)
- INSEE/Postal code: 68345 /68320
- ^{1} French Land Register data, which excludes lakes, ponds, glaciers > 1 km^{2} (0.386 sq mi or 247 acres) and river estuaries.

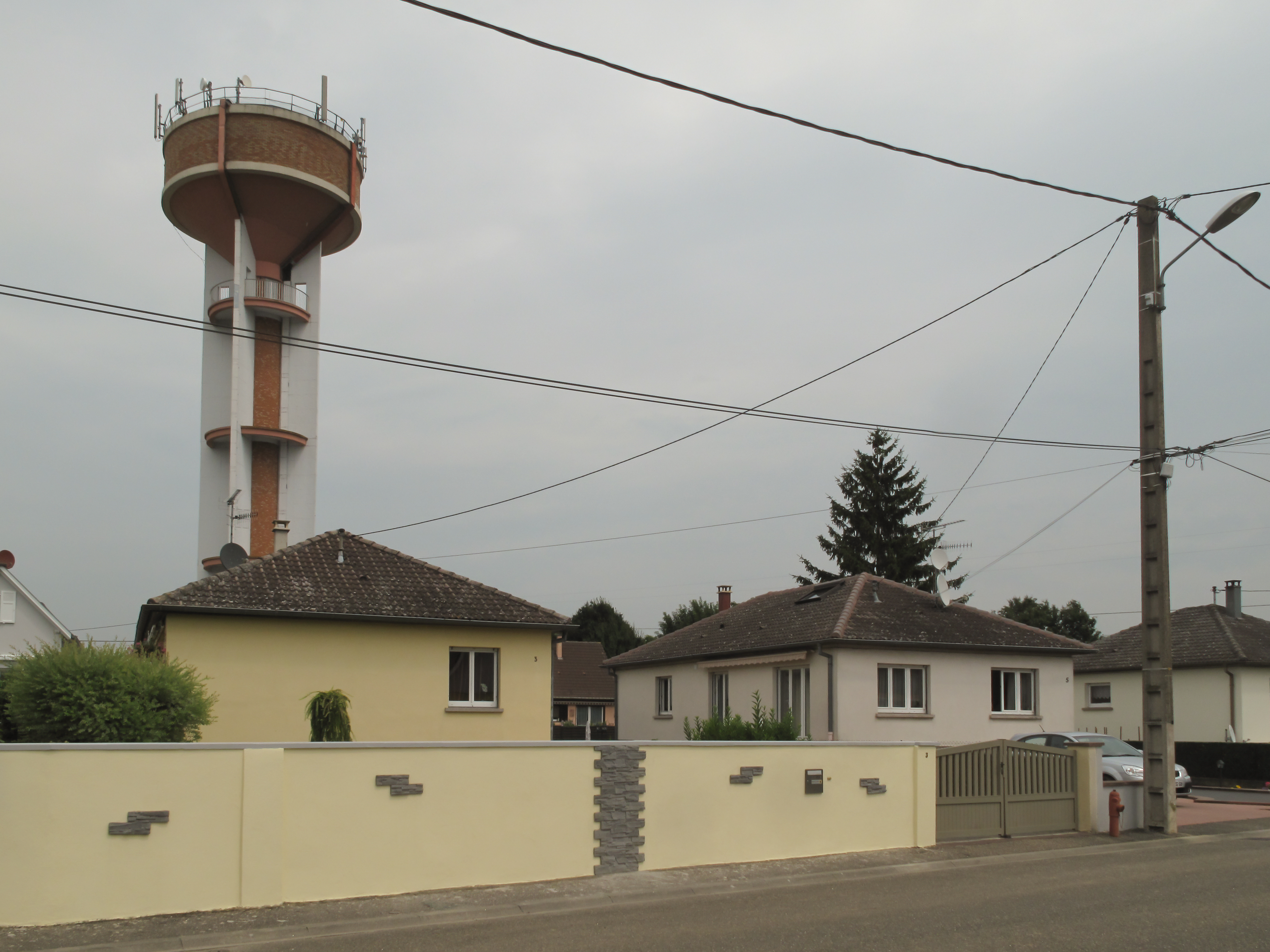
Urschenheim, watertower in the street

Urschenheim (French pronunciation: [yʁʃənaim]; Alsatian: Ürsche) is a commune in the Haut-Rhin department in Grand Est in north-eastern France.

== See also ==
- Communes of the Haut-Rhin department
