= Munchhouse =

Commune in Grand Est, France

- Commune
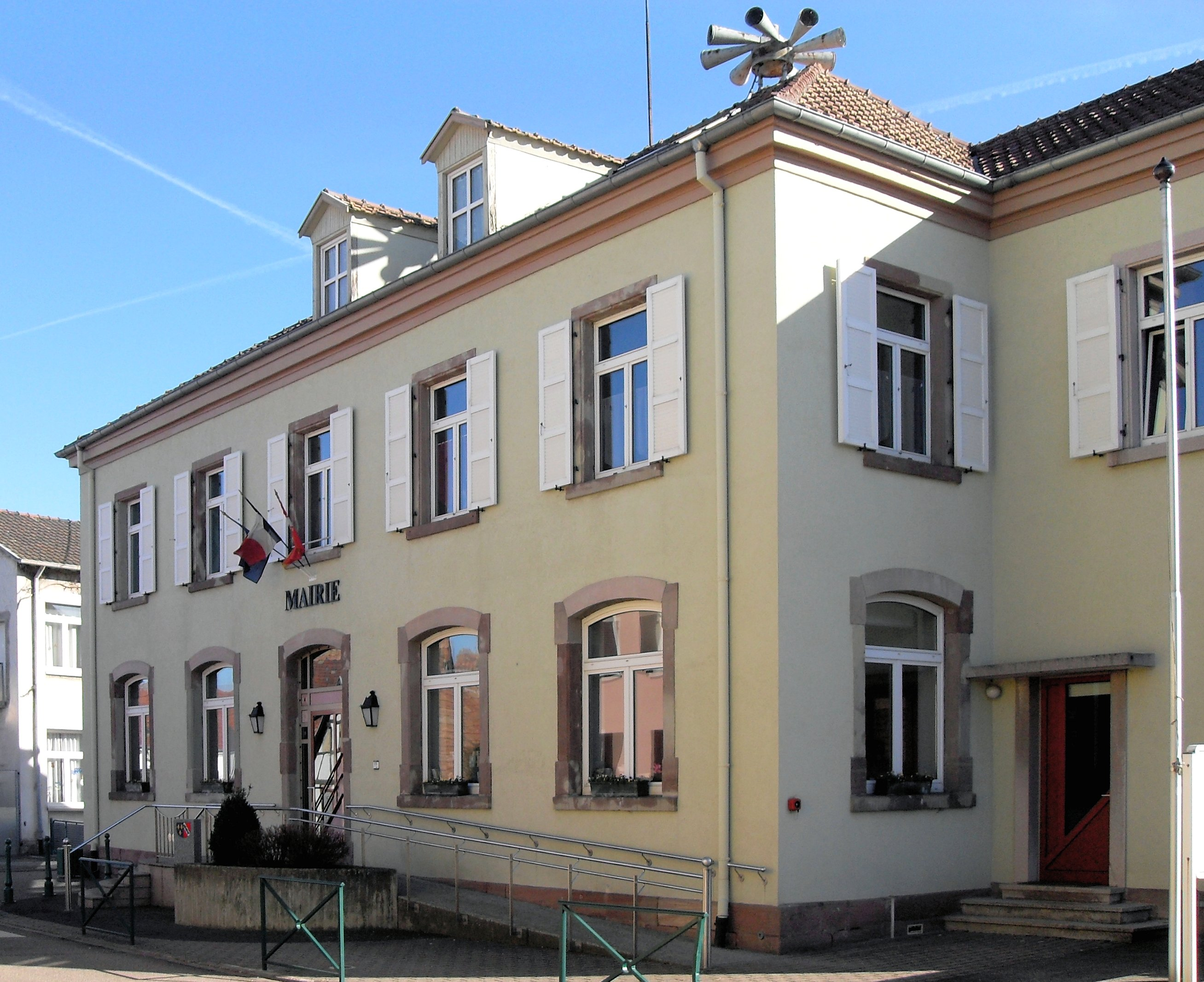
- The town hall in Munchhouse

- Coat of arms
- Location of Munchhouse
- Location within France Location within Grand Est
- Coordinates: 47°52′09″N 7°27′06″E
- Country: France
- Region: Grand Est
- Department: Haut-Rhin
- Arrondissement: Colmar-Ribeauvillé
- Canton: Ensisheim

Government
  - Mayor (2020–2026): Philippe Heid
- Area^{1}: 24.05 km^{2} (9.29 sq mi)
- Elevation: 217 m (712 ft)
- Highest elevation: 227 m (745 ft)
- Lowest elevation: 214 m (702 ft)
- Population (2023): 1,518
  - Density: 63.12/km^{2} (163.5/sq mi)
- Time zone: UTC+01:00 (CET)
  - Summer (DST): UTC+02:00 (CEST)
- INSEE/Postal code: 68225 /68740
- ^{1} French Land Register data, which excludes lakes, ponds, glaciers > 1 km^{2} (0.386 sq mi or 247 acres) and river estuaries.

Munchhouse (French pronunciation: [mynʃuz]; German: Münchhausen; Alsatian: Mínkhüse) is a commune in the Haut-Rhin department in Grand Est in north-eastern France.

== See also ==
- Communes of the Haut-Rhin département
