= Hirtzfelden =

Commune in Grand Est, France

- Commune
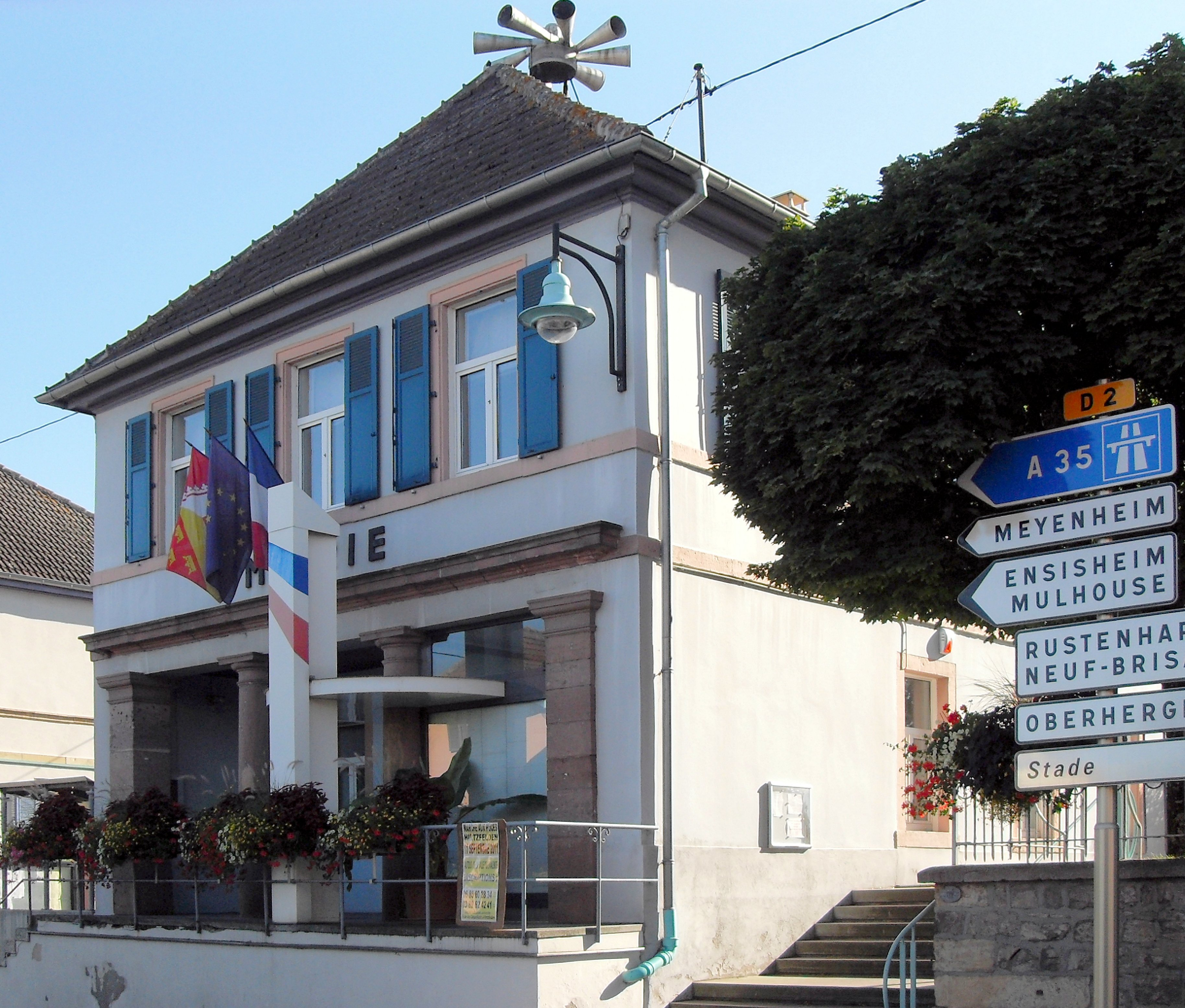
- The town hall in Hirtzfelden

- Coat of arms
- Location of Hirtzfelden
- Location within France Location within Grand Est
- Coordinates: 47°54′45″N 7°26′46″E
- Country: France
- Region: Grand Est
- Department: Haut-Rhin
- Arrondissement: Colmar-Ribeauvillé
- Canton: Ensisheim

Government
  - Mayor (2020–2026): Stéphane Senez
- Area^{1}: 22.1 km^{2} (8.5 sq mi)
- Elevation: 210 m (690 ft)
- Highest elevation: 217 m (712 ft)
- Lowest elevation: 206 m (676 ft)
- Population (2023): 1,259
  - Density: 57.0/km^{2} (148/sq mi)
- Time zone: UTC+01:00 (CET)
  - Summer (DST): UTC+02:00 (CEST)
- INSEE/Postal code: 68140 /68740
- ^{1} French Land Register data, which excludes lakes, ponds, glaciers > 1 km^{2} (0.386 sq mi or 247 acres) and river estuaries.

Hirtzfelden (French pronunciation: [iʁtsfɛldən]; German: Hirzfelden; Alsatian: Hírzfàlde) is a commune in the Haut-Rhin department in Grand Est in north-eastern France.

== See also ==
- Communes of the Haut-Rhin département
