= Widensolen =

Commune in Grand Est, France

- Commune
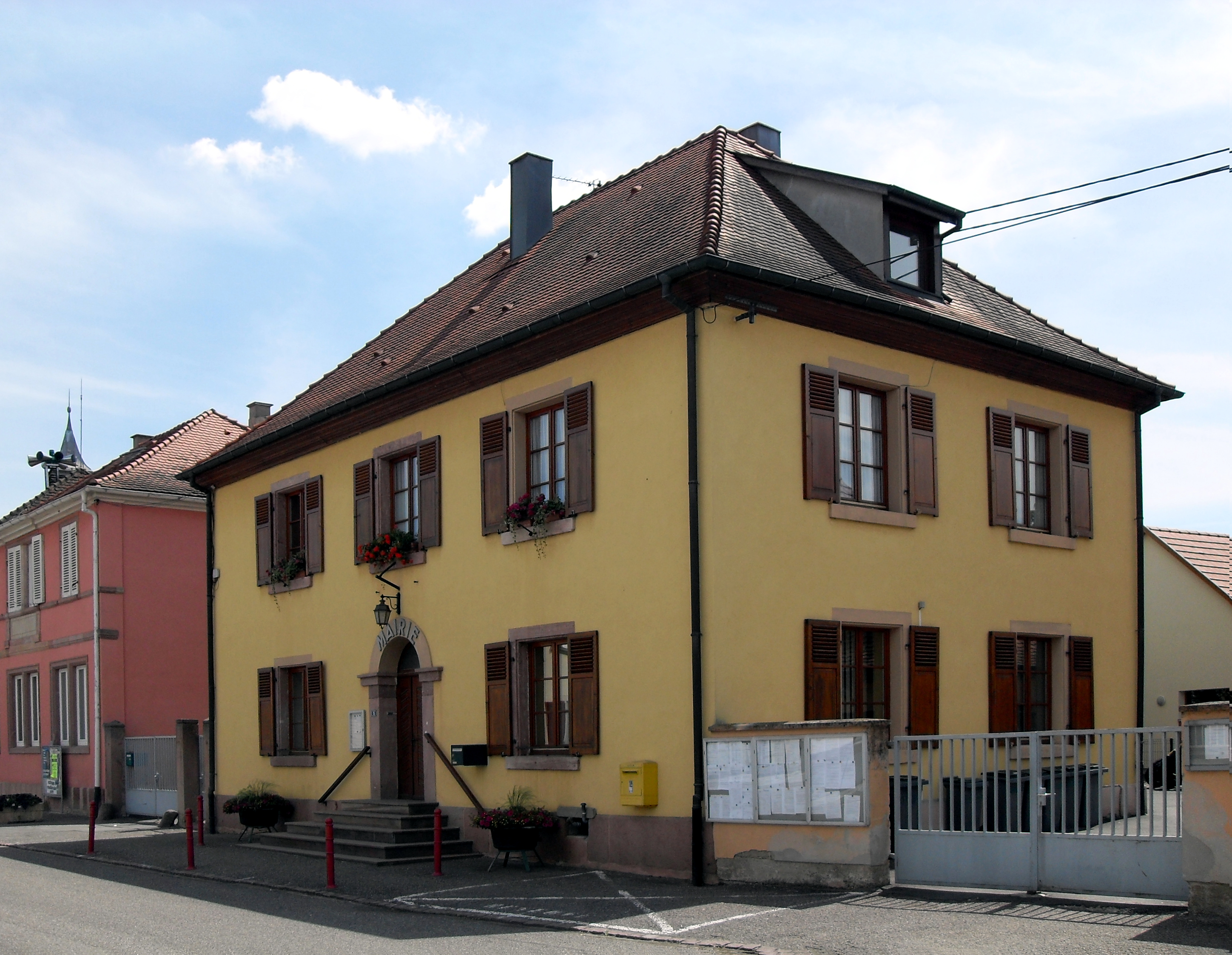
- The town hall in Widensolen

- Coat of arms
- Location of Widensolen
- Location within France Location within Grand Est
- Coordinates: 48°03′47″N 7°28′51″E
- Country: France
- Region: Grand Est
- Department: Haut-Rhin
- Arrondissement: Colmar-Ribeauvillé
- Canton: Ensisheim
- Intercommunality: CC Alsace Rhin Brisach

Government
  - Mayor (2020–2026): Josiane Bigel
- Area^{1}: 10.67 km^{2} (4.12 sq mi)
- Elevation: 188 m (617 ft)
- Highest elevation: 194 m (636 ft)
- Lowest elevation: 184 m (604 ft)
- Population (2023): 1,215
  - Density: 113.9/km^{2} (294.9/sq mi)
- Time zone: UTC+01:00 (CET)
  - Summer (DST): UTC+02:00 (CEST)
- INSEE/Postal code: 68367 /68320
- ^{1} French Land Register data, which excludes lakes, ponds, glaciers > 1 km^{2} (0.386 sq mi or 247 acres) and river estuaries.

Widensolen (French pronunciation: [vidənzolən]; German: Widensohlen; Alsatian: Widsole) is a commune in the Haut-Rhin department in Grand Est in north-eastern France.

== Population ==
Historical population
| Year | Pop. | ±% p.a. |
|---|---|---|
| 1968 | 431 | — |
| 1975 | 506 | +2.32% |
| 1982 | 624 | +3.04% |
| 1990 | 825 | +3.55% |
| 1999 | 1,051 | +2.73% |
| 2007 | 1,238 | +2.07% |
| 2012 | 1,208 | −0.49% |
| 2017 | 1,177 | −0.52% |
| 2023 | 1,215 | +0.53% |
Source: INSEE

== See also ==
- Communes of the Haut-Rhin department
