= Baltzenheim =

Commune in Grand Est, France

- Commune
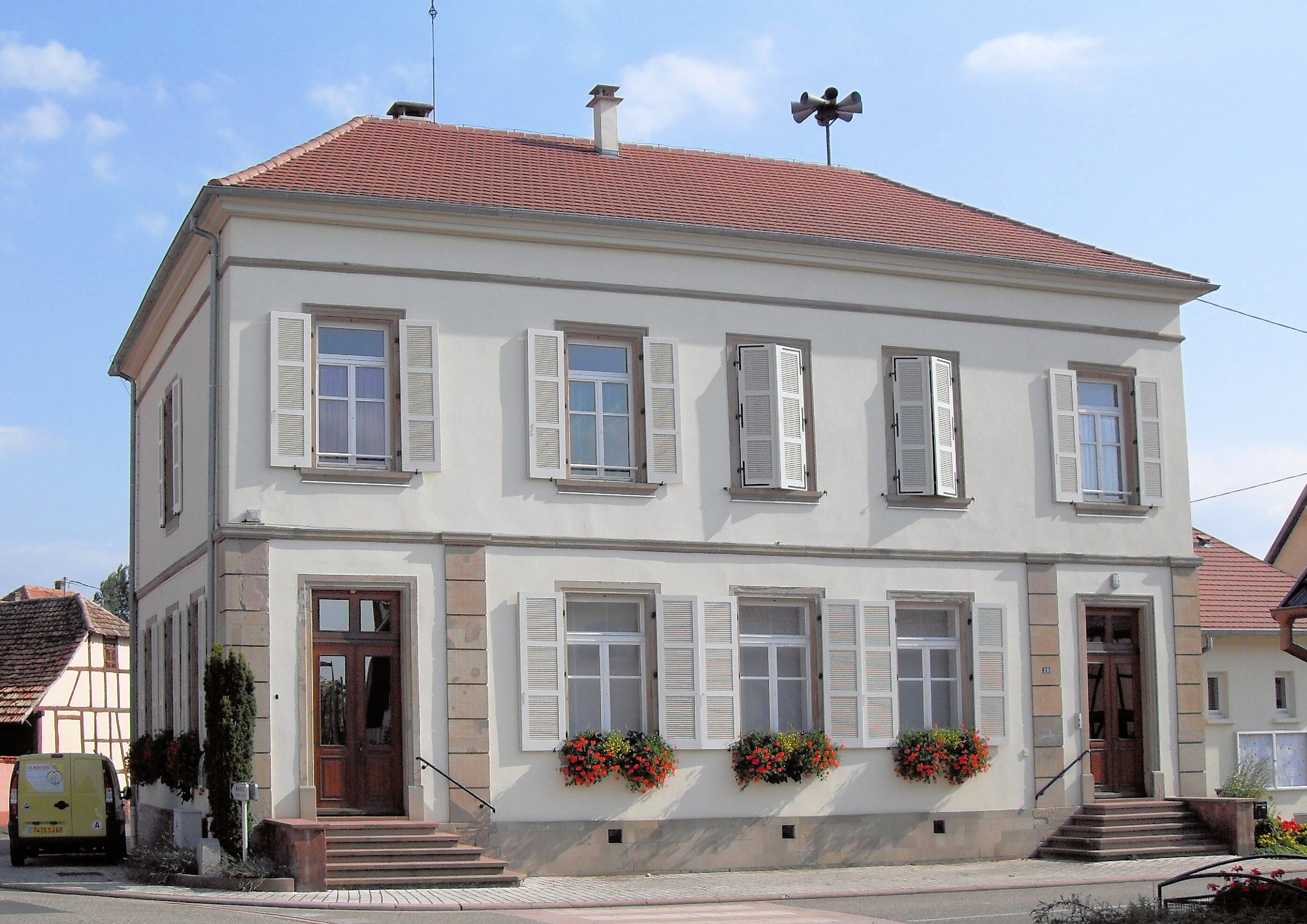
- The town hall in Baltzenheim

- Coat of arms
- Location of Baltzenheim
- Location within France Location within Grand Est
- Coordinates: 48°05′41″N 7°33′24″E
- Country: France
- Region: Grand Est
- Department: Haut-Rhin
- Arrondissement: Colmar-Ribeauvillé
- Canton: Ensisheim

Government
  - Mayor (2020–2026): Sébastien Fréchard
- Area^{1}: 6.52 km^{2} (2.52 sq mi)
- Elevation: 183 m (600 ft)
- Highest elevation: 186 m (610 ft)
- Lowest elevation: 180 m (590 ft)
- Population (2023): 581
  - Density: 89.1/km^{2} (231/sq mi)
- Time zone: UTC+01:00 (CET)
  - Summer (DST): UTC+02:00 (CEST)
- INSEE/Postal code: 68019 /68320
- ^{1} French Land Register data, which excludes lakes, ponds, glaciers > 1 km^{2} (0.386 sq mi or 247 acres) and river estuaries.

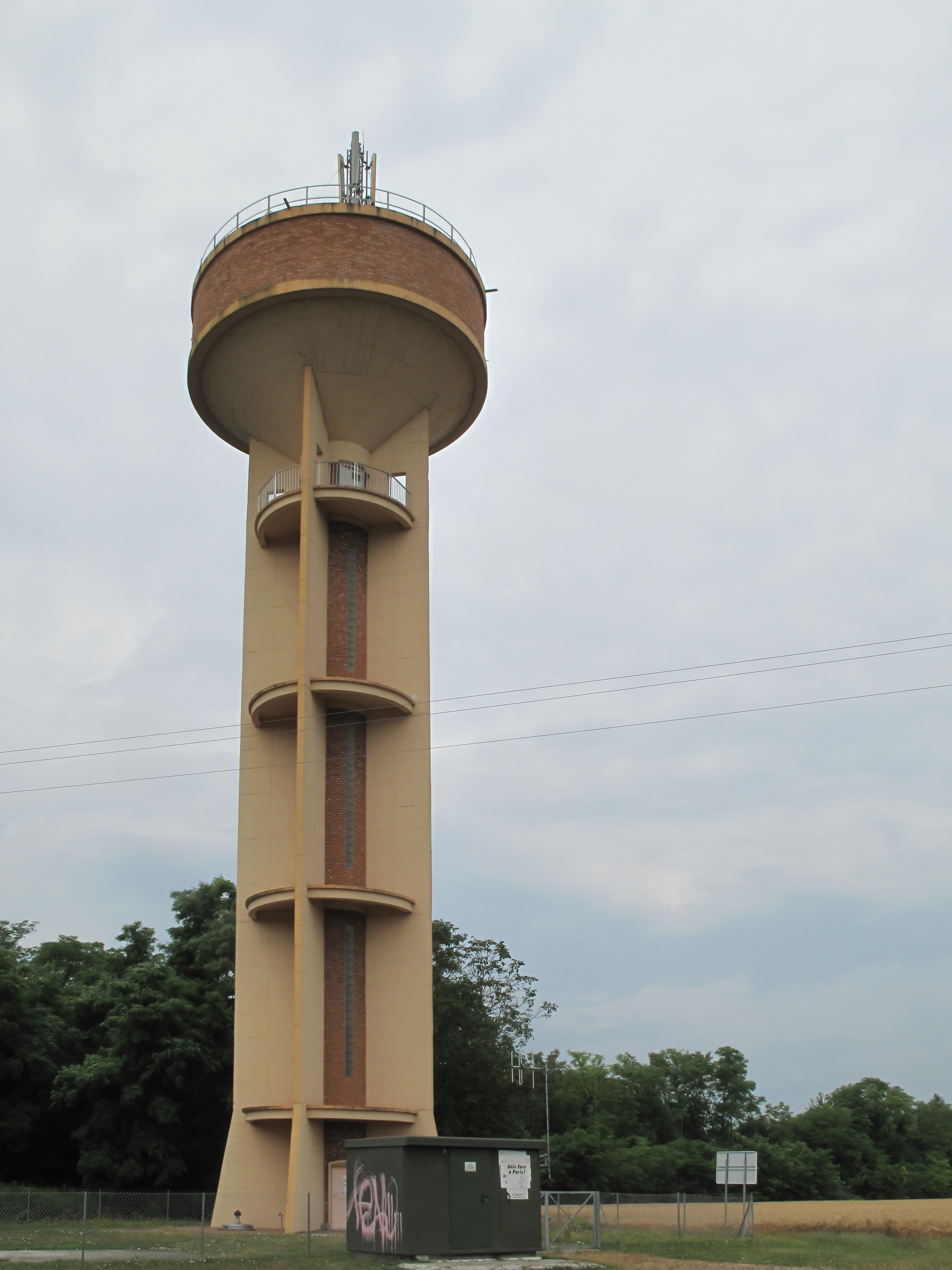
Baltzenheim, watertower

Baltzenheim (French pronunciation: [baltsənaim]; German: Balzenheim; Alsatian: Balze) is a commune in the Haut-Rhin department in Grand Est in north-eastern France.

== See also ==
- Communes of the Haut-Rhin department
