= Roggenhouse =

Commune in Grand Est, France

- Commune
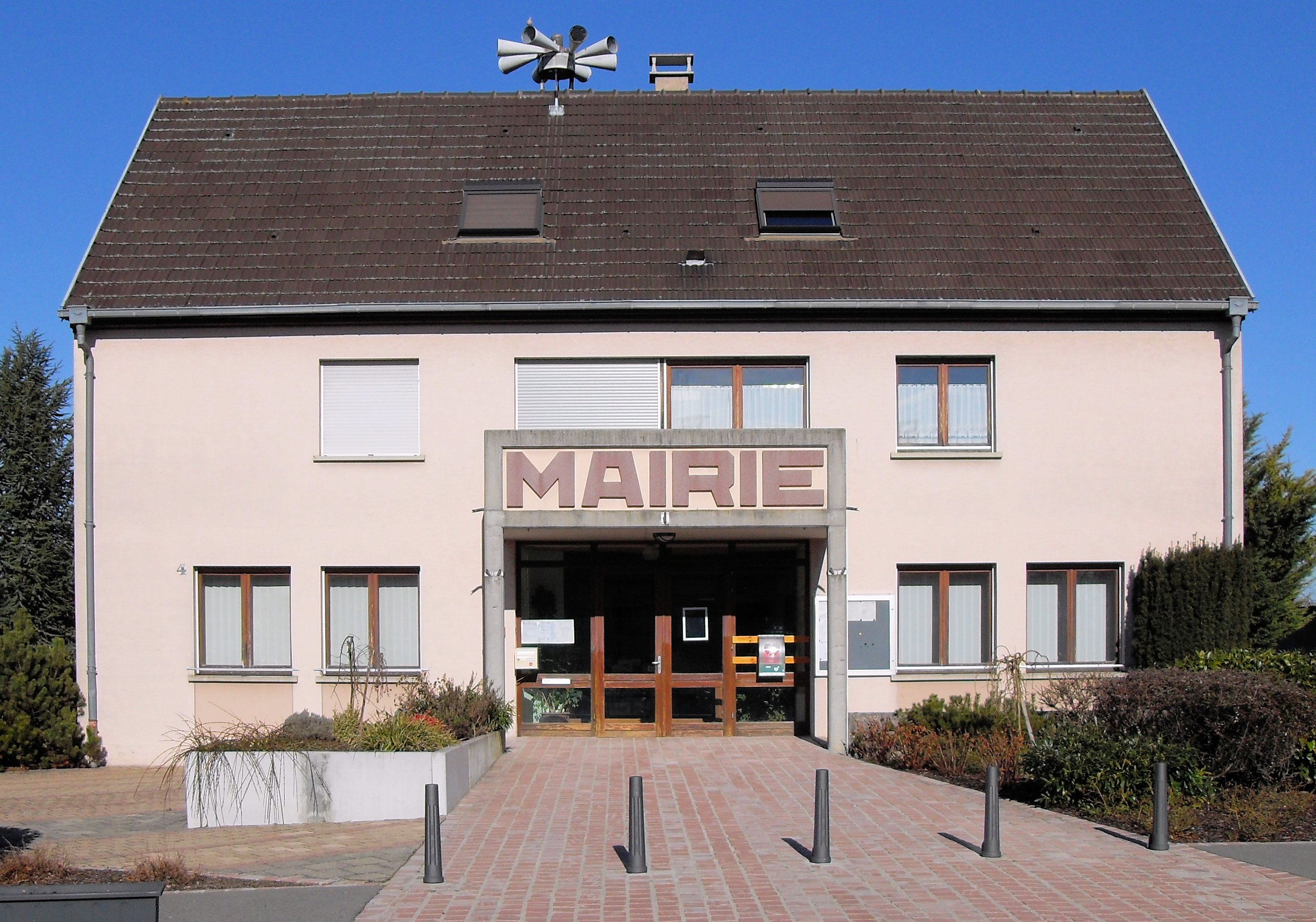
- The town hall in Roggenhouse

- Coat of arms
- Location of Roggenhouse
- Location within France Location within Grand Est
- Coordinates: 47°53′26″N 7°28′18″E
- Country: France
- Region: Grand Est
- Department: Haut-Rhin
- Arrondissement: Colmar-Ribeauvillé
- Canton: Ensisheim

Government
  - Mayor (2020–2026): Vincent Naegelen
- Area^{1}: 6.45 km^{2} (2.49 sq mi)
- Elevation: 215 m (705 ft)
- Highest elevation: 219 m (719 ft)
- Lowest elevation: 213 m (699 ft)
- Population (2023): 458
  - Density: 71.0/km^{2} (184/sq mi)
- Time zone: UTC+01:00 (CET)
  - Summer (DST): UTC+02:00 (CEST)
- INSEE/Postal code: 68281 /68740
- ^{1} French Land Register data, which excludes lakes, ponds, glaciers > 1 km^{2} (0.386 sq mi or 247 acres) and river estuaries.

Roggenhouse (French pronunciation: [ʁɔɡənuz]; German: Roggenhausen) is a commune in the Haut-Rhin department in Grand Est in north-eastern France.

== See also ==
- Communes of the Haut-Rhin department
