= Canton of Ensisheim =

Coordinates: 47.87°N 7.35°E

The canton of Ensisheim is an administrative division of the Haut-Rhin department, northeastern France. Its borders were modified at the French canton reorganisation which came into effect in March 2015. Its seat is in Ensisheim.

It consists of the following communes:

1. Algolsheim
2. Appenwihr
3. Artzenheim
4. Balgau
5. Baltzenheim
6. Biesheim
7. Biltzheim
8. Blodelsheim
9. Dessenheim
10. Durrenentzen
11. Ensisheim
12. Fessenheim
13. Geiswasser
14. Heiteren
15. Hettenschlag
16. Hirtzfelden
17. Kunheim
18. Logelheim
19. Meyenheim
20. Munchhouse
21. Munwiller
22. Nambsheim
23. Neuf-Brisach
24. Niederentzen
25. Niederhergheim
26. Oberentzen
27. Oberhergheim
28. Obersaasheim
29. Réguisheim
30. Roggenhouse
31. Rumersheim-le-Haut
32. Rustenhart
33. Urschenheim
34. Vogelgrun
35. Volgelsheim
36. Weckolsheim
37. Widensolen
38. Wolfgantzen
