= Wolfgantzen =

Commune in Grand Est, France

- Commune
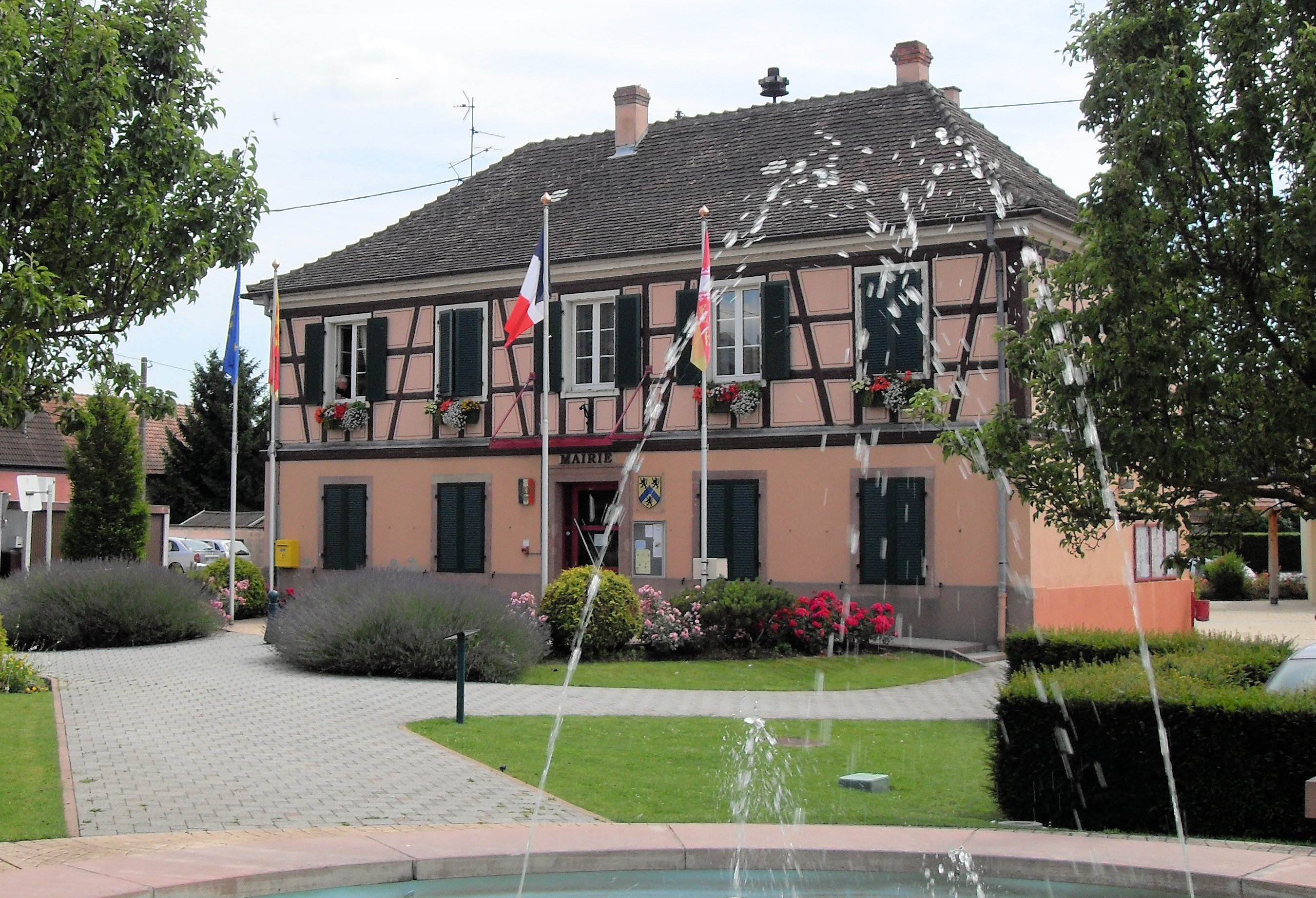
- The town hall in Wolfgantzen

- Coat of arms
- Location of Wolfgantzen
- Location within France Location within Grand Est
- Coordinates: 48°01′38″N 7°30′06″E
- Country: France
- Region: Grand Est
- Department: Haut-Rhin
- Arrondissement: Colmar-Ribeauvillé
- Canton: Ensisheim
- Intercommunality: CC Alsace Rhin Brisach

Government
  - Mayor (2020–2026): Jean-Louis Herbaut
- Area^{1}: 9.38 km^{2} (3.62 sq mi)
- Elevation: 193 m (633 ft)
- Highest elevation: 197 m (646 ft)
- Lowest elevation: 191 m (627 ft)
- Population (2023): 1,190
  - Density: 127/km^{2} (329/sq mi)
- Time zone: UTC+01:00 (CET)
  - Summer (DST): UTC+02:00 (CEST)
- INSEE/Postal code: 68379 /68600
- ^{1} French Land Register data, which excludes lakes, ponds, glaciers > 1 km^{2} (0.386 sq mi or 247 acres) and river estuaries.

Wolfgantzen (German: Wolfganzen) is a commune in the Haut-Rhin department and Grand Est region of north-eastern France.

== Population ==
Historical population
Year	Pop.	±% p.a.
1968	383	—
1975	409	+0.94%
1982	836	+10.75%
1990	822	−0.21%
1999	972	+1.88%
2007	1,037	+0.81%
2012	1,037	+0.00%
2017	1,048	+0.21%
2023	1,190	+2.14%
Source: INSEE

== See also ==
- Communes of the Haut-Rhin department
