= Balgau =

Commune in Grand Est, France

- Commune
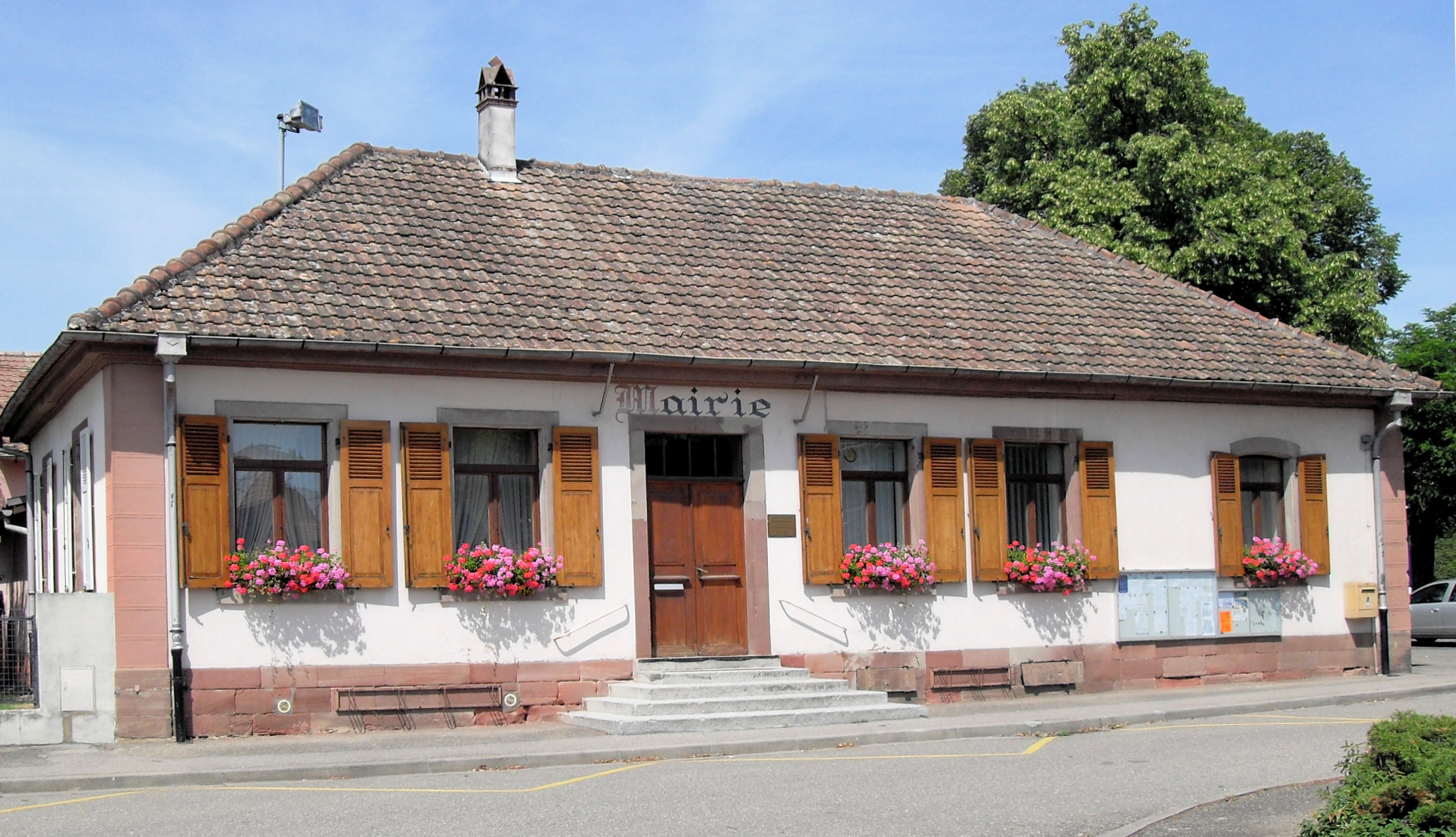
- The town hall in Balgau

- Coat of arms
- Location of Balgau
- Location within France Location within Grand Est
- Coordinates: 47°55′43″N 7°32′27″E
- Country: France
- Region: Grand Est
- Department: Haut-Rhin
- Arrondissement: Colmar-Ribeauvillé
- Canton: Ensisheim

Government
  - Mayor (2020–2026): Philippe Jeandel
- Area^{1}: 9.49 km^{2} (3.66 sq mi)
- Elevation: 205 m (673 ft)
- Highest elevation: 212 m (696 ft)
- Lowest elevation: 198 m (650 ft)
- Population (2023): 947
  - Density: 99.8/km^{2} (258/sq mi)
- Time zone: UTC+01:00 (CET)
  - Summer (DST): UTC+02:00 (CEST)
- INSEE/Postal code: 68016 /68740
- ^{1} French Land Register data, which excludes lakes, ponds, glaciers > 1 km^{2} (0.386 sq mi or 247 acres) and river estuaries.

Balgau (French pronunciation: [balɡo] or French pronunciation: [balɡau]; Alsatian: Balgäu) is a commune in the Haut-Rhin department in Grand Est in north-eastern France.

== See also ==
- Communes of the Haut-Rhin department
