= Volgelsheim =

Commune in Grand Est, France

Volgelsheim Volgelse
- Commune
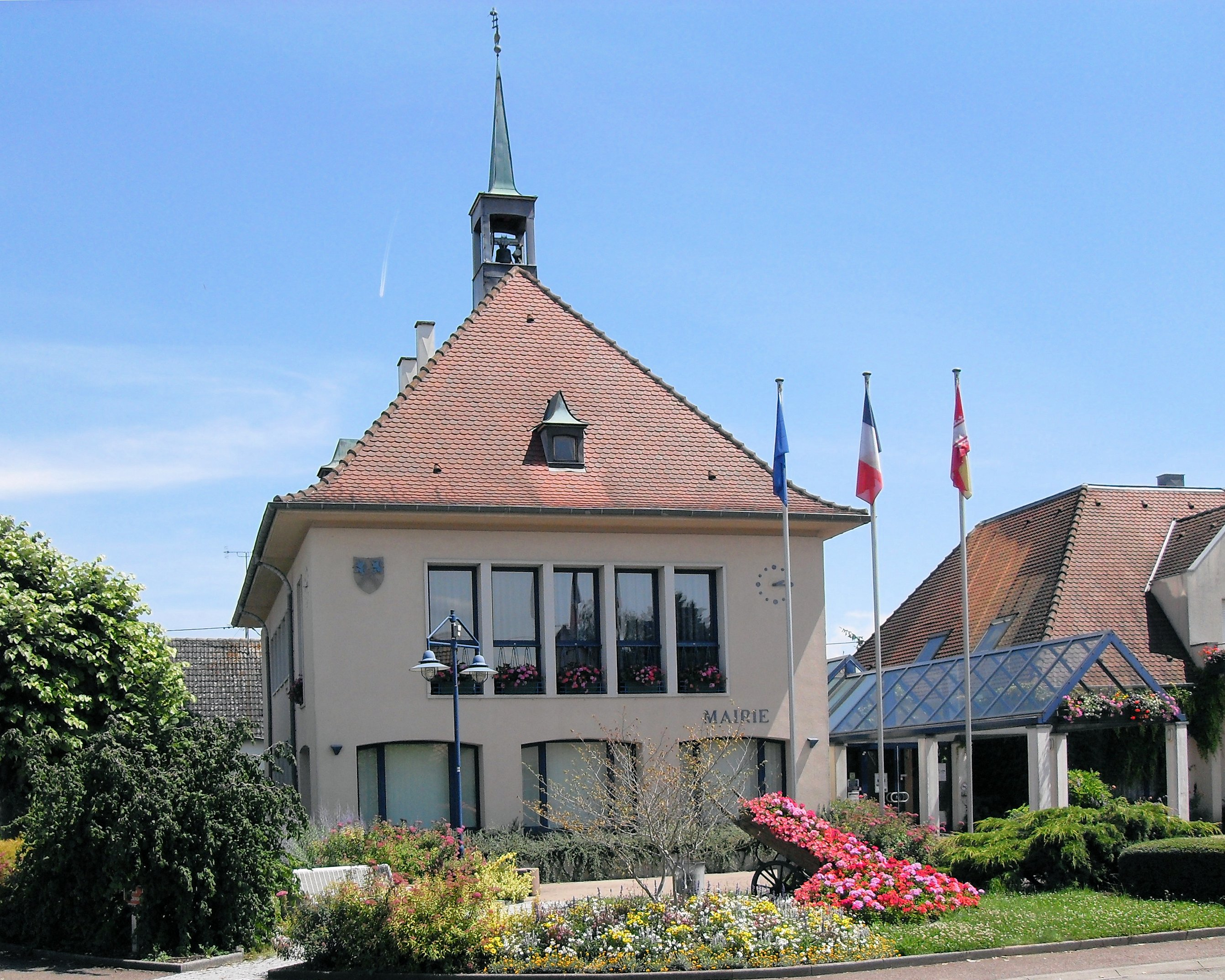
- The town hall in Volgelsheim

- Coat of arms
- Location of Volgelsheim
- Location within France Location within Grand Est
- Coordinates: 48°00′58″N 7°32′54″E
- Country: France
- Region: Grand Est
- Department: Haut-Rhin
- Arrondissement: Colmar-Ribeauvillé
- Canton: Ensisheim
- Intercommunality: CC Alsace Rhin Brisach

Government
  - Mayor (2020–2026): Philippe Mas
- Area^{1}: 8.64 km^{2} (3.34 sq mi)
- Elevation: 192 m (630 ft)
- Highest elevation: 198 m (650 ft)
- Lowest elevation: 188 m (617 ft)
- Population (2023): 2,720
  - Density: 315/km^{2} (815/sq mi)
- Time zone: UTC+01:00 (CET)
  - Summer (DST): UTC+02:00 (CEST)
- INSEE/Postal code: 68352 /68600
- ^{1} French Land Register data, which excludes lakes, ponds, glaciers > 1 km^{2} (0.386 sq mi or 247 acres) and river estuaries.

Volgelsheim (French pronunciation: [fɔlɡəlsaim]; Alemannic German: Volgelse) is a commune in the Haut-Rhin department in Grand Est in north-eastern France.

== History ==
Volgelsheim was first mentioned in 739 under the name Folcoaldeshaim. The name has changed several times over the centuries to the present spelling. From 1871 to 1918, it belonged to the Alsace-Lorraine imperial territory in the German Empire. During this time, in 1880, a station was built in Prussian style. Until 1992, the French army had a garrison in Volgelsheim (Abbatucci barracks).

== Population ==
Historical population
| Year | Pop. | ±% p.a. |
|---|---|---|
| 1968 | 1,181 | — |
| 1975 | 1,930 | +7.27% |
| 1982 | 2,570 | +4.18% |
| 1990 | 2,695 | +0.60% |
| 1999 | 2,382 | −1.36% |
| 2007 | 2,322 | −0.32% |
| 2012 | 2,237 | −0.74% |
| 2017 | 2,668 | +3.59% |
| 2023 | 2,720 | +0.32% |
Source: INSEE

== See also ==
- Communes of the Haut-Rhin department
