= Nambsheim =

Commune in Grand Est, France

- Commune
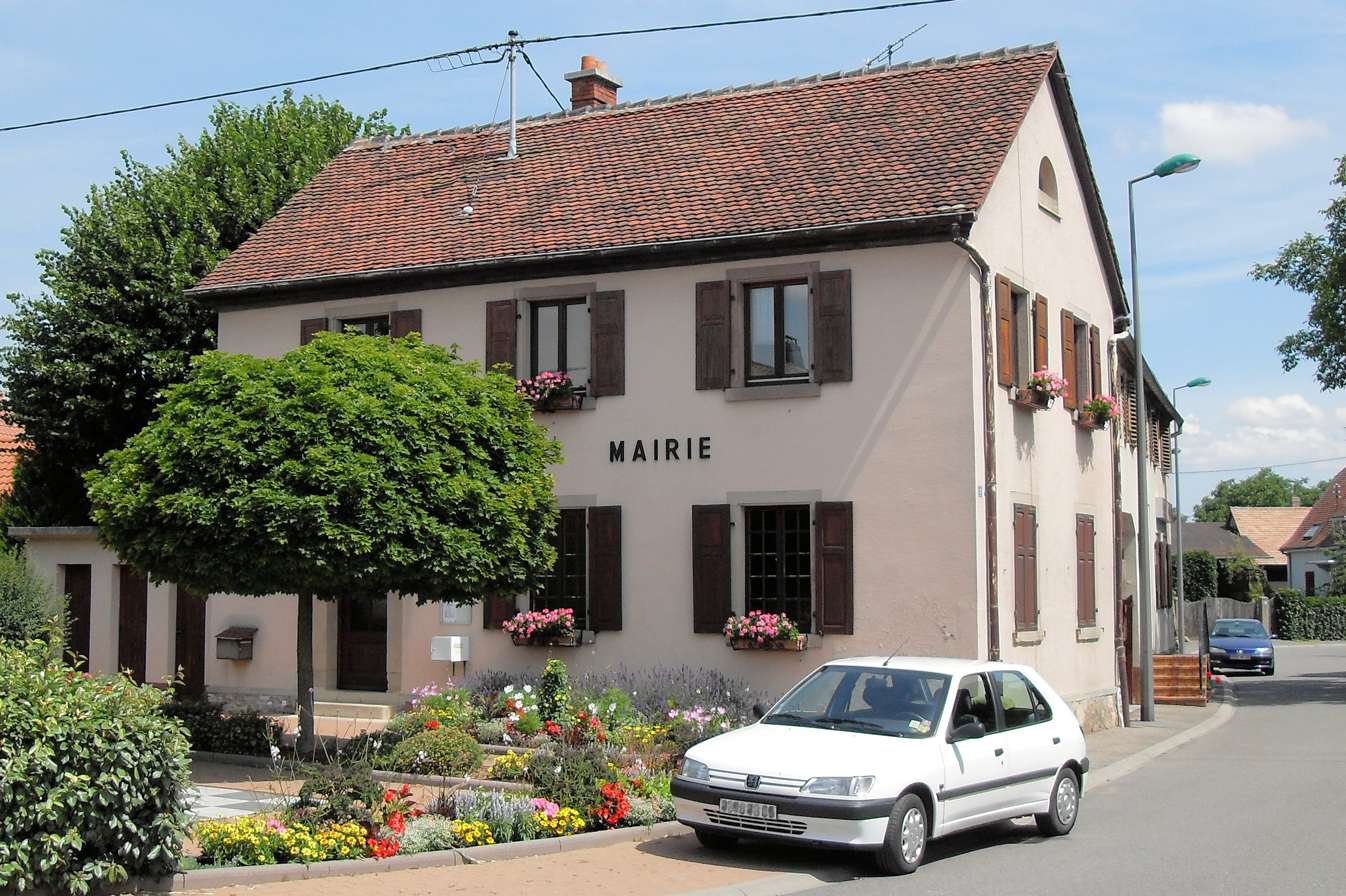
- The town hall in Nambsheim

- Coat of arms
- Location of Nambsheim
- Location within France Location within Grand Est
- Coordinates: 47°56′07″N 7°33′50″E
- Country: France
- Region: Grand Est
- Department: Haut-Rhin
- Arrondissement: Colmar-Ribeauvillé
- Canton: Ensisheim

Government
  - Mayor (2020–2026): Christine Schwartz
- Area^{1}: 10.03 km^{2} (3.87 sq mi)
- Elevation: 203 m (666 ft)
- Highest elevation: 208 m (682 ft)
- Lowest elevation: 197 m (646 ft)
- Population (2023): 576
  - Density: 57.4/km^{2} (149/sq mi)
- Time zone: UTC+01:00 (CET)
  - Summer (DST): UTC+02:00 (CEST)
- INSEE/Postal code: 68230 /68740
- ^{1} French Land Register data, which excludes lakes, ponds, glaciers > 1 km^{2} (0.386 sq mi or 247 acres) and river estuaries.

Nambsheim is a commune in the Haut-Rhin department in Grand Est in north-eastern France.

== See also ==
- Communes of the Haut-Rhin department
