= Heiteren =

Commune in Grand Est, France

Heiteren Haitre
- Commune
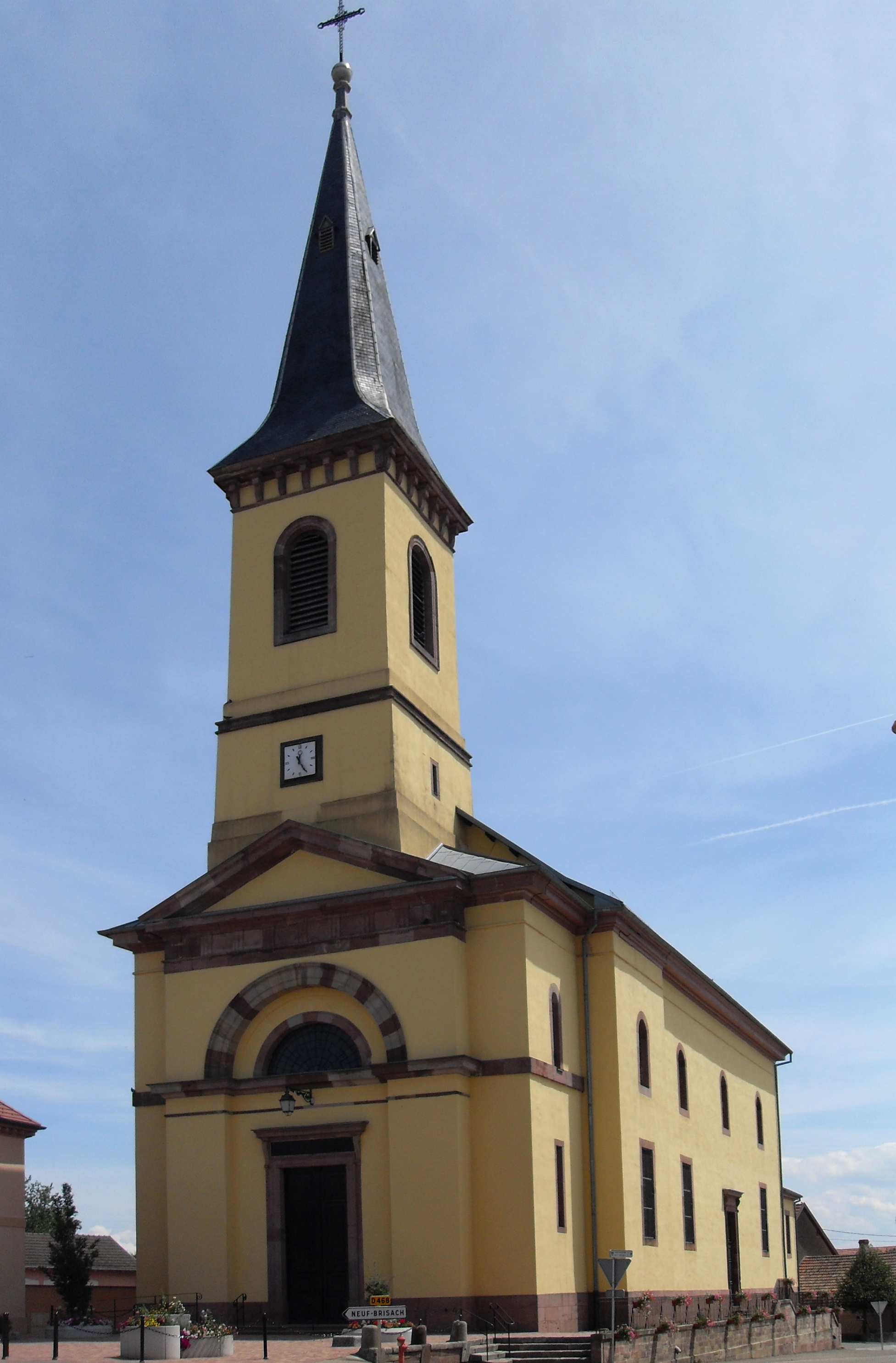
- The church in Heiteren

- Coat of arms
- Location of Heiteren
- Location within France Location within Grand Est
- Coordinates: 47°58′13″N 7°32′33″E
- Country: France
- Region: Grand Est
- Department: Haut-Rhin
- Arrondissement: Colmar-Ribeauvillé
- Canton: Ensisheim

Government
  - Mayor (2020–2026): Dominique Schmitt
- Area^{1}: 22.4 km^{2} (8.6 sq mi)
- Elevation: 200 m (660 ft)
- Highest elevation: 209 m (686 ft)
- Lowest elevation: 196 m (643 ft)
- Population (2023): 1,069
  - Density: 47.7/km^{2} (124/sq mi)
- Time zone: UTC+01:00 (CET)
  - Summer (DST): UTC+02:00 (CEST)
- INSEE/Postal code: 68130 /68600
- ^{1} French Land Register data, which excludes lakes, ponds, glaciers > 1 km^{2} (0.386 sq mi or 247 acres) and river estuaries.

Heiteren (French pronunciation: [aitəʁən]) is a commune in the Haut-Rhin department in Grand Est in north-eastern France.

The Song "Ballade von Heiteren" performed by Walter Mossmann is dedicated to the resistance against the construction of the Fessenheim Nuclear Power Plant in the 1970s. It describes the organisation of the protests in a roundhouse near Heiteren and the violent repression against the protesters, e.g. by burning down the roundhouse.

== See also ==
- Communes of the Haut-Rhin département
