= Weckolsheim =

Commune in Grand Est, France

Weckolsheim Wàckelse
- Commune
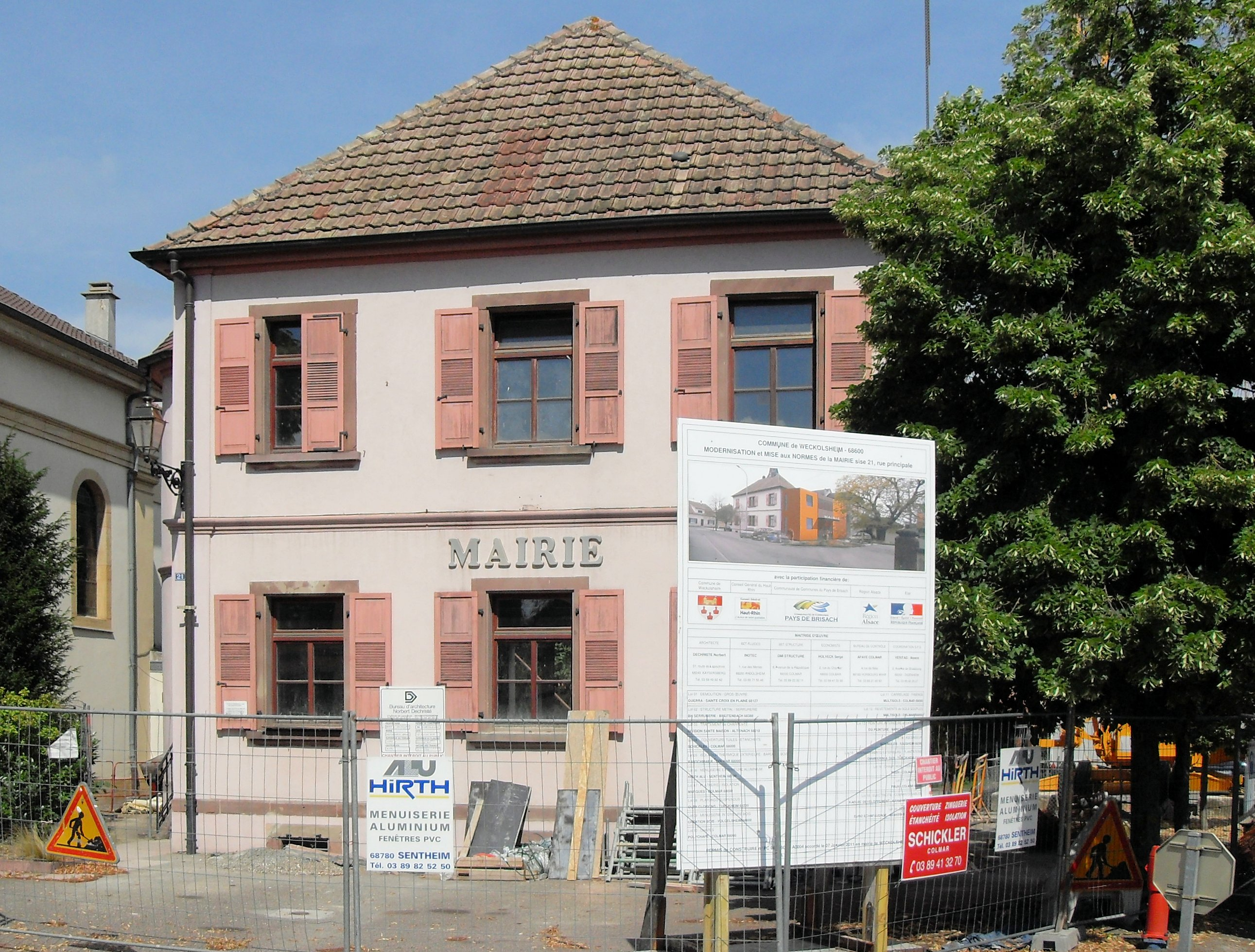
- The town hall in Weckolsheim

- Coat of arms
- Location of Weckolsheim
- Location within France Location within Grand Est
- Coordinates: 48°00′12″N 7°30′47″E
- Country: France
- Region: Grand Est
- Department: Haut-Rhin
- Arrondissement: Colmar-Ribeauvillé
- Canton: Ensisheim
- Intercommunality: CC Alsace Rhin Brisach

Government
  - Mayor (2020–2026): Arlette Bradat
- Area^{1}: 6.93 km^{2} (2.68 sq mi)
- Elevation: 197 m (646 ft)
- Highest elevation: 201 m (659 ft)
- Lowest elevation: 194 m (636 ft)
- Population (2023): 742
  - Density: 107/km^{2} (277/sq mi)
- Time zone: UTC+01:00 (CET)
  - Summer (DST): UTC+02:00 (CEST)
- INSEE/Postal code: 68360 /68600
- ^{1} French Land Register data, which excludes lakes, ponds, glaciers > 1 km^{2} (0.386 sq mi or 247 acres) and river estuaries.

Weckolsheim (French pronunciation: [vɛkɔlsaim]) is a commune in the Haut-Rhin department in Grand Est in north-eastern France.

== Population ==
Historical population
Year	Pop.	±% p.a.
1968	184	—
1975	179	−0.39%
1982	197	+1.38%
1990	252	+3.13%
1999	362	+4.11%
2007	596	+6.43%
2012	612	+0.53%
2017	665	+1.67%
2023	742	+1.84%
Source: INSEE

== See also ==
- Communes of the Haut-Rhin department
