= Appenwihr =

Commune in Grand Est, France

- Commune
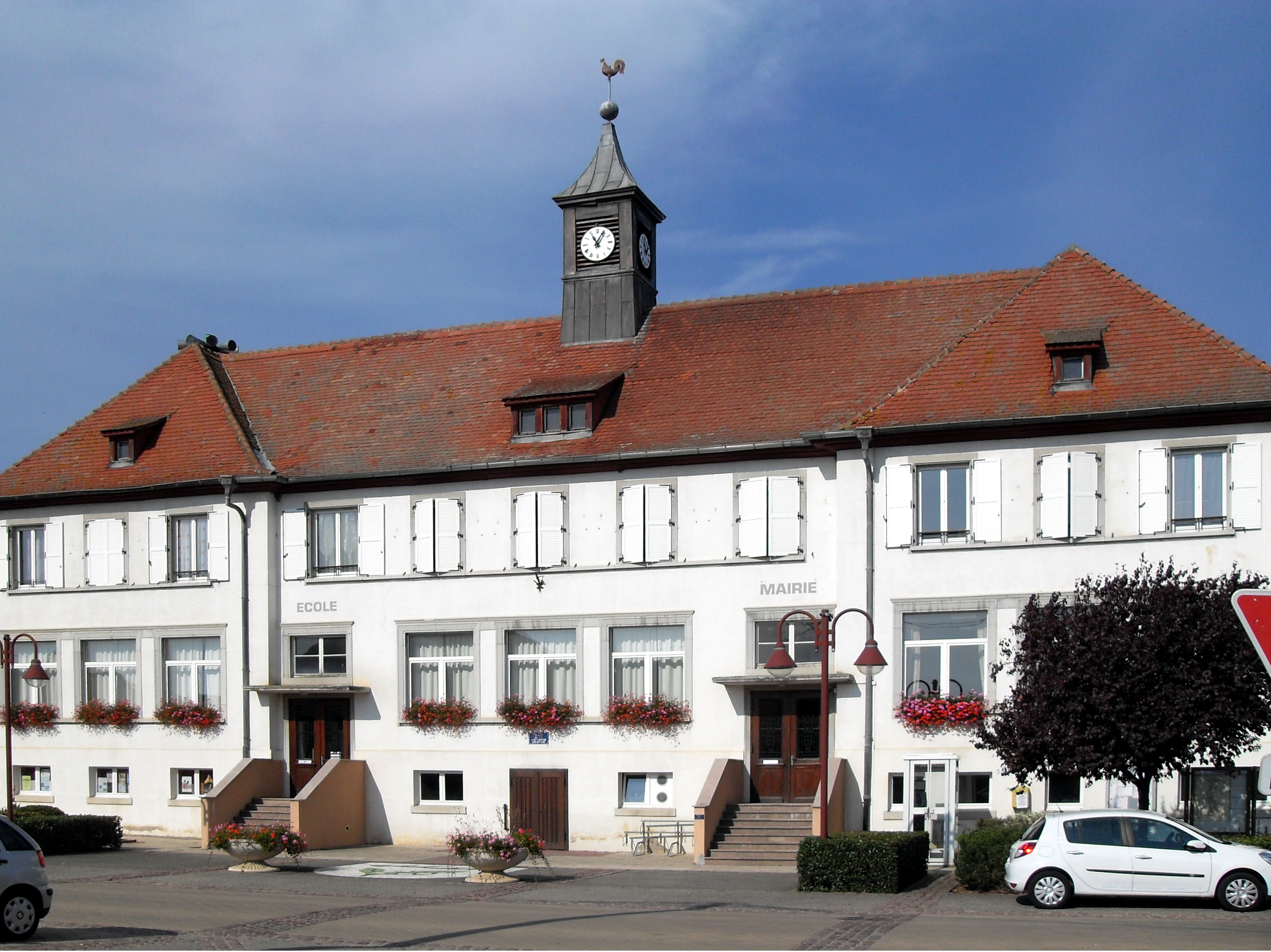
- The town hall and school in Appenwihr

- Coat of arms
- Location of Appenwihr
- Location within France Location within Grand Est
- Coordinates: 48°01′39″N 7°26′26″E
- Country: France
- Region: Grand Est
- Department: Haut-Rhin
- Arrondissement: Colmar-Ribeauvillé
- Canton: Ensisheim

Government
  - Mayor (2020–2026): Thierry Sautivet
- Area^{1}: 7.72 km^{2} (2.98 sq mi)
- Elevation: 192 m (630 ft)
- Highest elevation: 197 m (646 ft)
- Lowest elevation: 191 m (627 ft)
- Population (2023): 586
  - Density: 75.9/km^{2} (197/sq mi)
- Time zone: UTC+01:00 (CET)
  - Summer (DST): UTC+02:00 (CEST)
- INSEE/Postal code: 68008 /68280
- ^{1} French Land Register data, which excludes lakes, ponds, glaciers > 1 km^{2} (0.386 sq mi or 247 acres) and river estuaries.

Appenwihr (French pronunciation: [apənviʁ]; German: Appenweier) is a commune in the Haut-Rhin department in Grand Est in north-eastern France.

== See also ==
- Communes of the Haut-Rhin department
