= Logelheim =

Commune in Grand Est, France

- Commune
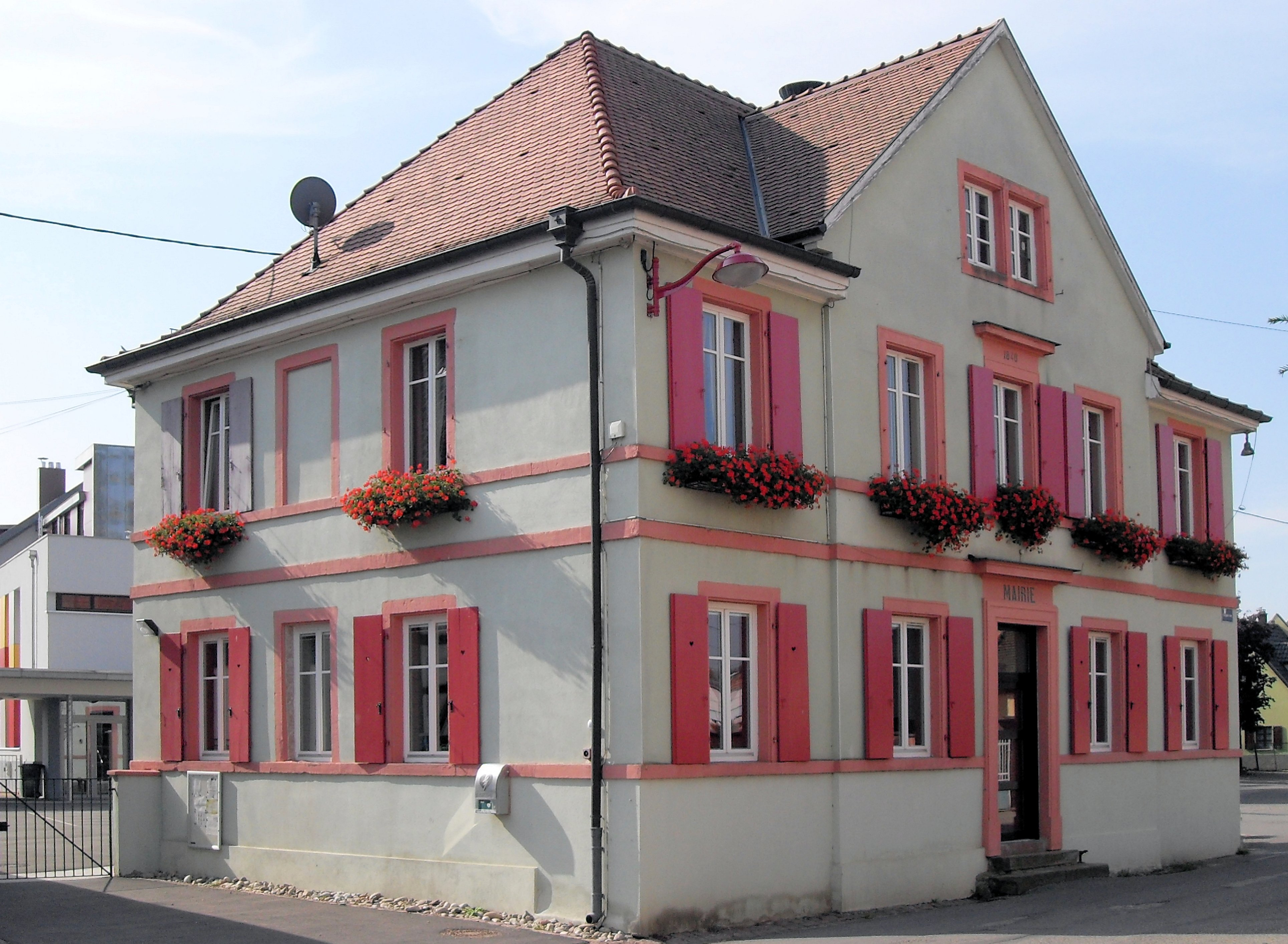
- The town hall of Logelheim

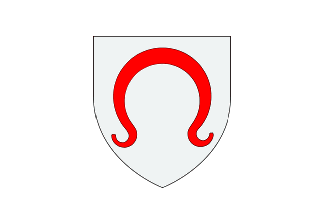
- Flag Coat of arms
- Location of Logelheim
- Location within France Location within Grand Est
- Coordinates: 48°01′20″N 7°24′31″E
- Country: France
- Region: Grand Est
- Department: Haut-Rhin
- Arrondissement: Colmar-Ribeauvillé
- Canton: Ensisheim

Government
  - Mayor (2020–2026): Joseph Kammerer
- Area^{1}: 4.33 km^{2} (1.67 sq mi)
- Elevation: 195 m (640 ft)
- Highest elevation: 197 m (646 ft)
- Lowest elevation: 193 m (633 ft)
- Population (2023): 950
  - Density: 220/km^{2} (570/sq mi)
- Time zone: UTC+01:00 (CET)
  - Summer (DST): UTC+02:00 (CEST)
- INSEE/Postal code: 68189 /68280
- ^{1} French Land Register data, which excludes lakes, ponds, glaciers > 1 km^{2} (0.386 sq mi or 247 acres) and river estuaries.

Logelheim (French pronunciation: [loɡəlaim]; Alsatian: Logele) is a commune in the Haut-Rhin department in Grand Est in north-eastern France.

== See also ==
- Communes of the Haut-Rhin département
