= Algolsheim =

Commune in Grand Est, France

Algolsheim Algelse
- Commune
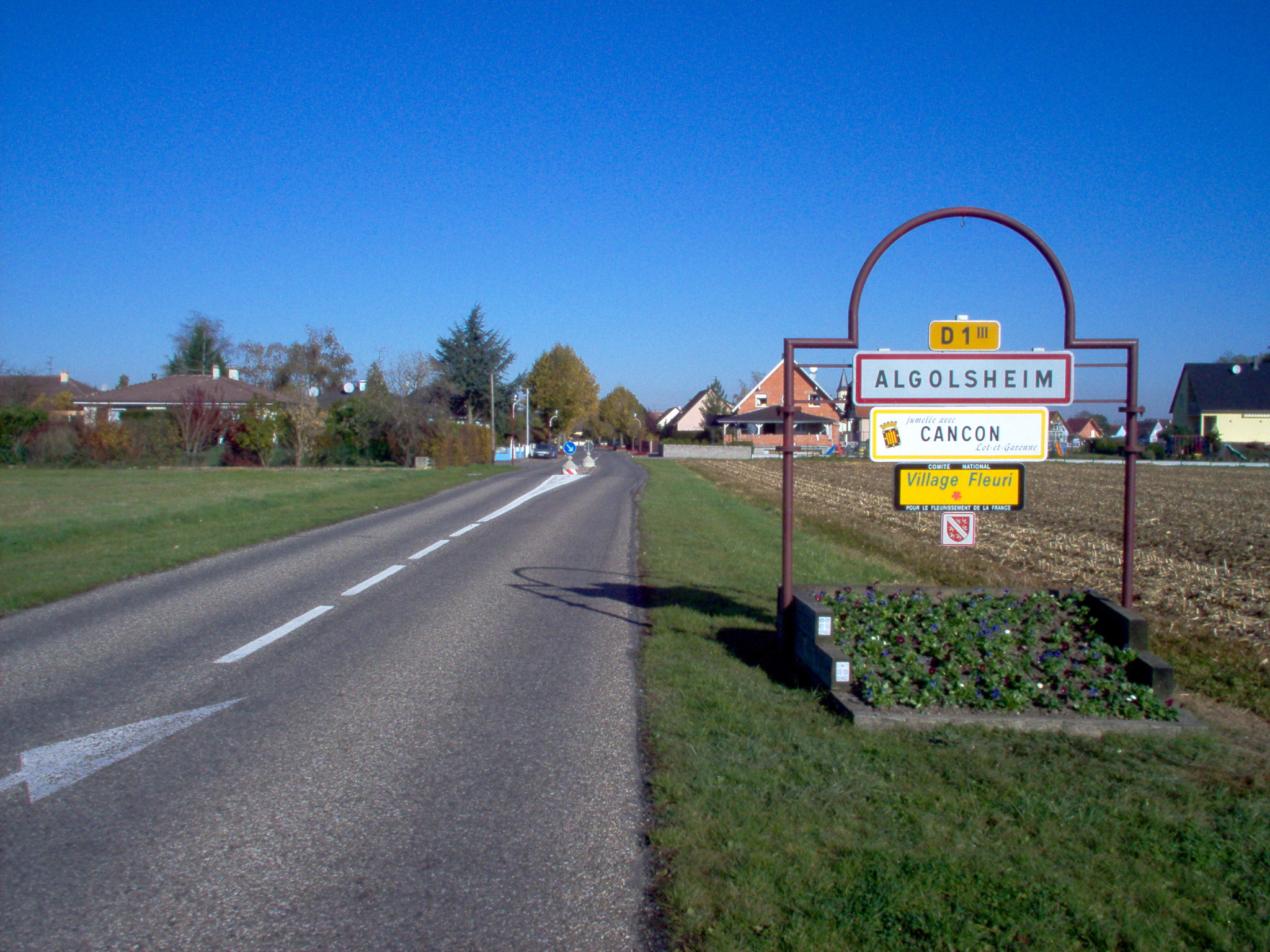
- Entrance of the village

- Coat of arms
- Location of Algolsheim
- Location within France Location within Grand Est
- Coordinates: 48°00′24″N 7°33′36″E
- Country: France
- Region: Grand Est
- Department: Haut-Rhin
- Arrondissement: Colmar-Ribeauvillé
- Canton: Ensisheim
- Intercommunality: CC Alsace Rhin Brisach

Government
  - Mayor (2020–2026): André Sieber
- Area^{1}: 7.22 km^{2} (2.79 sq mi)
- Highest elevation: 199 m (653 ft)
- Lowest elevation: 190 m (620 ft)
- Population (2023): 1,112
  - Density: 154/km^{2} (399/sq mi)
- Time zone: UTC+01:00 (CET)
  - Summer (DST): UTC+02:00 (CEST)
- INSEE/Postal code: 68001 /68600
- ^{1} French Land Register data, which excludes lakes, ponds, glaciers > 1 km^{2} (0.386 sq mi or 247 acres) and river estuaries.

Algolsheim (French pronunciation: [alɡɔlsaim]; Alsatian: Àlgelsa) is a commune in the Haut-Rhin department in Grand Est in north-eastern France.

== Geography ==
This Alsatian commune is located in the Haut-Rhin (68) several kilometers from Neuf-Brisach. Situated 2 km (1.2 mi) from the border with Germany, Algolsheim includes a good number of German residents, which has considerably increased its number of inhabitants in recent years. Algolsheim is part of the Canton of Ensisheim and the Arrondissement of Colmar-Ribeauvillé.

== History ==
In 1196, the village was mentioned under the name d'Altolvisherde. From 1324 until the Revolution, the commune was part of the holdings of the counts of Wurtemberg. Between 1870 and 1875, several tombs of bronze were found in the territory of the commune. The village then held the name Alt-Olsheim. It owes its current name to the ease with which it can be confused with that of Andolsheim. The town includes a catholic church, a protestant temple since 1864, as well as a Mennonite chapel founded in 1977. Modernised agriculture, the principal industry of Algolsheim, maintains a healthy level, despite the increasing scarcity of farmers. More than half of the inhabitants of the commune work in the nearby industrial centers on the banks of the Rhine. The construction of new housing projects has led to an increase in the demographic diversity of the village. Algolsheim possesses a rich natural heritage, owing to the proximity of the Rhine forest and the île du Rhin.

== Population ==
Historical population
| Year | Pop. | ±% p.a. |
|---|---|---|
| 1968 | 312 | — |
| 1975 | 404 | +3.76% |
| 1982 | 495 | +2.94% |
| 1990 | 671 | +3.88% |
| 1999 | 982 | +4.32% |
| 2007 | 1,083 | +1.23% |
| 2012 | 1,172 | +1.59% |
| 2017 | 1,141 | −0.53% |
| 2023 | 1,112 | −0.43% |
Source: INSEE

== See also ==
- Communes of the Haut-Rhin department
