= Geiswasser =

Commune in Grand Est, France

- Commune
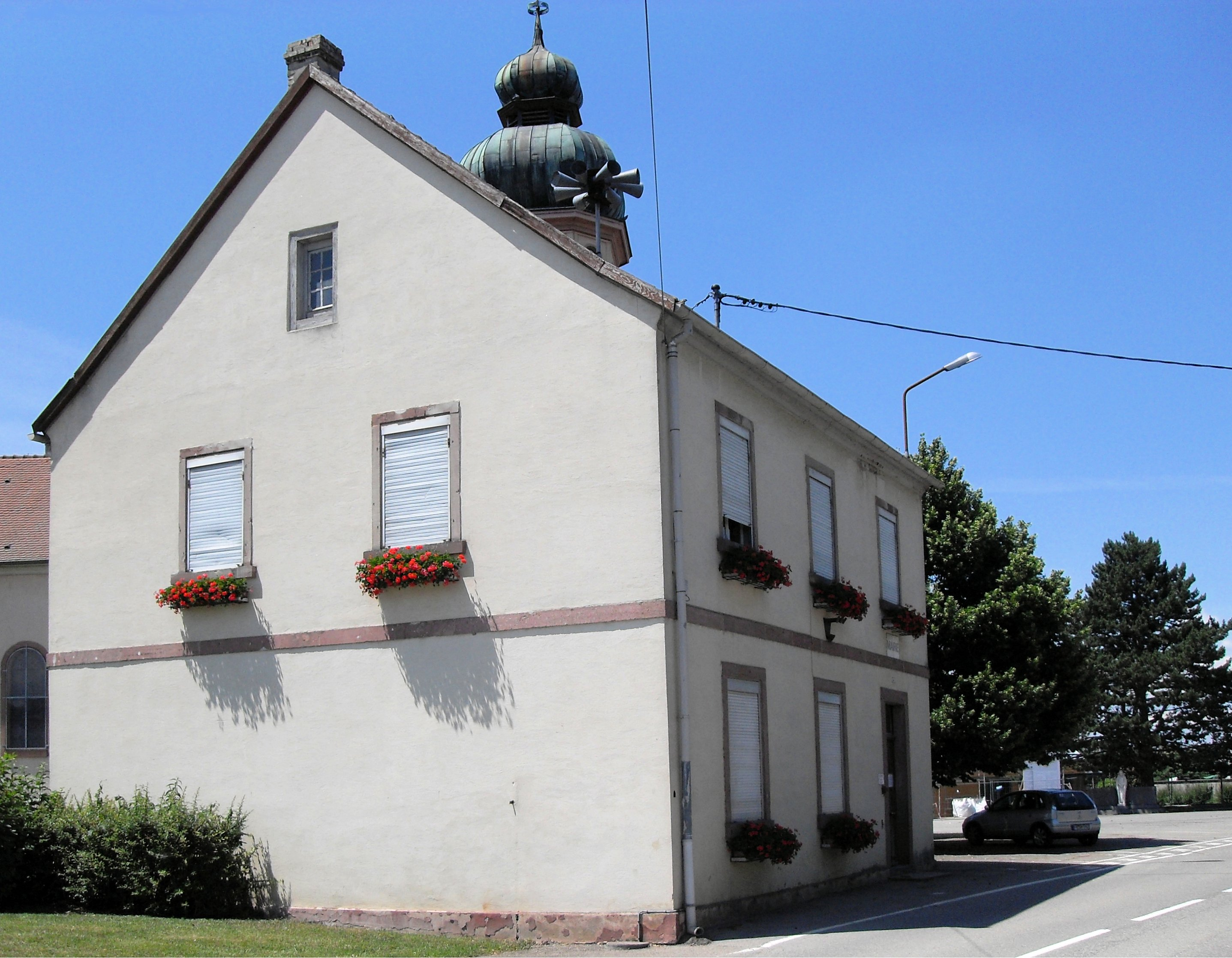
- The town hall in Geiswasser

- Coat of arms
- Location of Geiswasser
- Location within France Location within Grand Est
- Coordinates: 47°58′42″N 7°36′14″E
- Country: France
- Region: Grand Est
- Department: Haut-Rhin
- Arrondissement: Colmar-Ribeauvillé
- Canton: Ensisheim

Government
  - Mayor (2020–2026): Betty Muller
- Area^{1}: 8.24 km^{2} (3.18 sq mi)
- Elevation: 195 m (640 ft)
- Highest elevation: 200 m (660 ft)
- Lowest elevation: 193 m (633 ft)
- Population (2023): 341
  - Density: 41.4/km^{2} (107/sq mi)
- Time zone: UTC+01:00 (CET)
  - Summer (DST): UTC+02:00 (CEST)
- INSEE/Postal code: 68104 /68600
- ^{1} French Land Register data, which excludes lakes, ponds, glaciers > 1 km^{2} (0.386 sq mi or 247 acres) and river estuaries.

Geiswasser is a commune in the Haut-Rhin department in Grand Est in north-eastern France.

== See also ==
- Communes of the Haut-Rhin département
