= Dessenheim =

Commune in Grand Est, France

- Commune
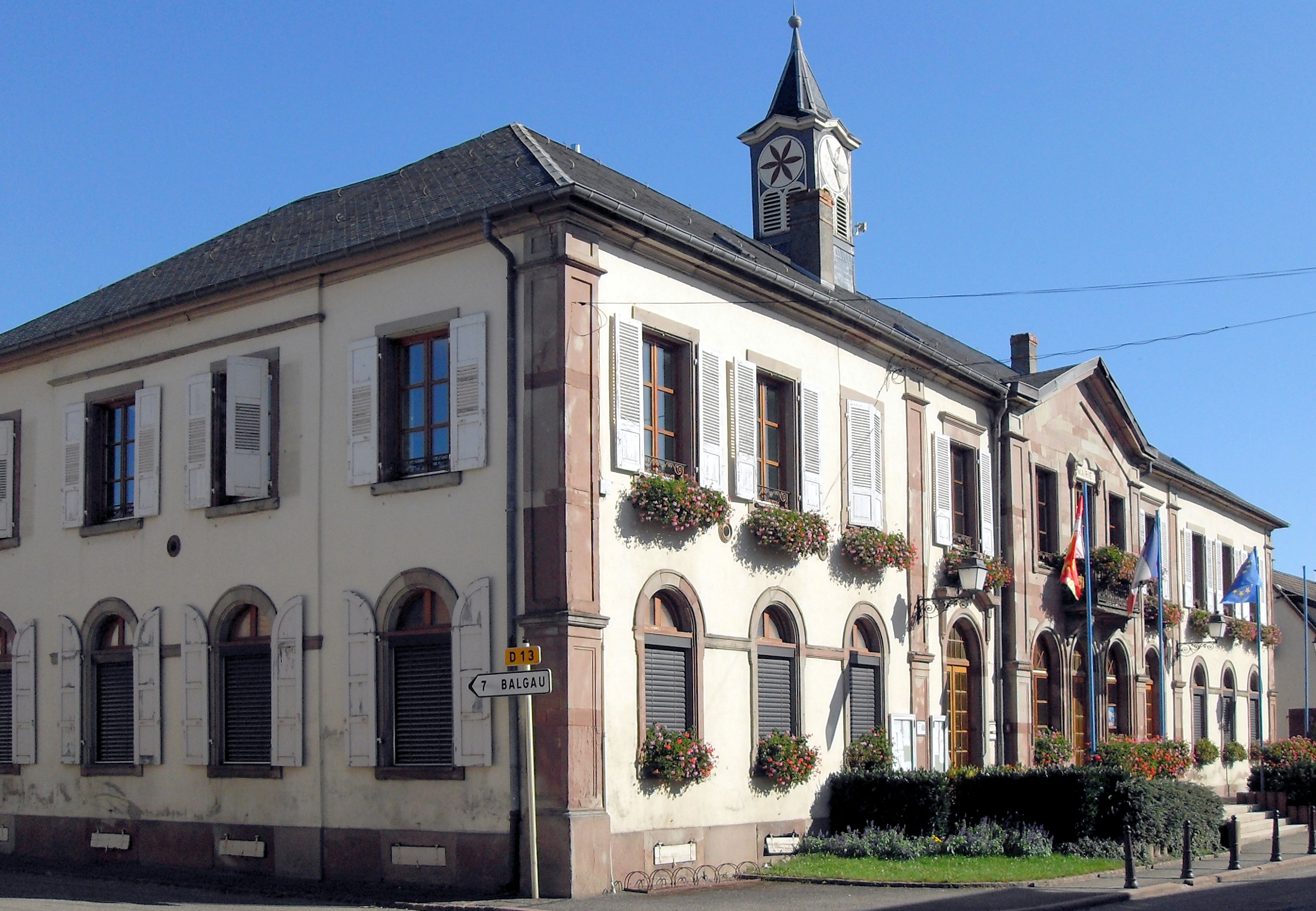
- The town hall in Dessenheim

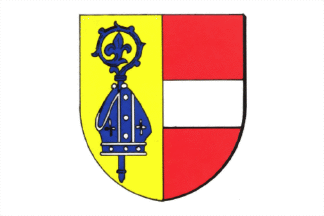
- Flag Coat of arms
- Location of Dessenheim
- Location within France Location within Grand Est
- Coordinates: 47°58′35″N 7°29′21″E
- Country: France
- Region: Grand Est
- Department: Haut-Rhin
- Arrondissement: Colmar-Ribeauvillé
- Canton: Ensisheim

Government
  - Mayor (2023–2026): Aurélie Forny
- Area^{1}: 19.16 km^{2} (7.40 sq mi)
- Elevation: 200 m (660 ft)
- Highest elevation: 207 m (679 ft)
- Lowest elevation: 197 m (646 ft)
- Population (2023): 1,442
  - Density: 75.26/km^{2} (194.9/sq mi)
- Time zone: UTC+01:00 (CET)
  - Summer (DST): UTC+02:00 (CEST)
- INSEE/Postal code: 68069 /68600
- ^{1} French Land Register data, which excludes lakes, ponds, glaciers > 1 km^{2} (0.386 sq mi or 247 acres) and river estuaries.

Dessenheim (French pronunciation: [dɛsənaim]; Alsatian: Dassene) is a commune in the Haut-Rhin department in Grand Est in north-eastern France.

== See also ==
- Communes of the Haut-Rhin department
