= Hettenschlag =

Commune in Grand Est, France

- Commune
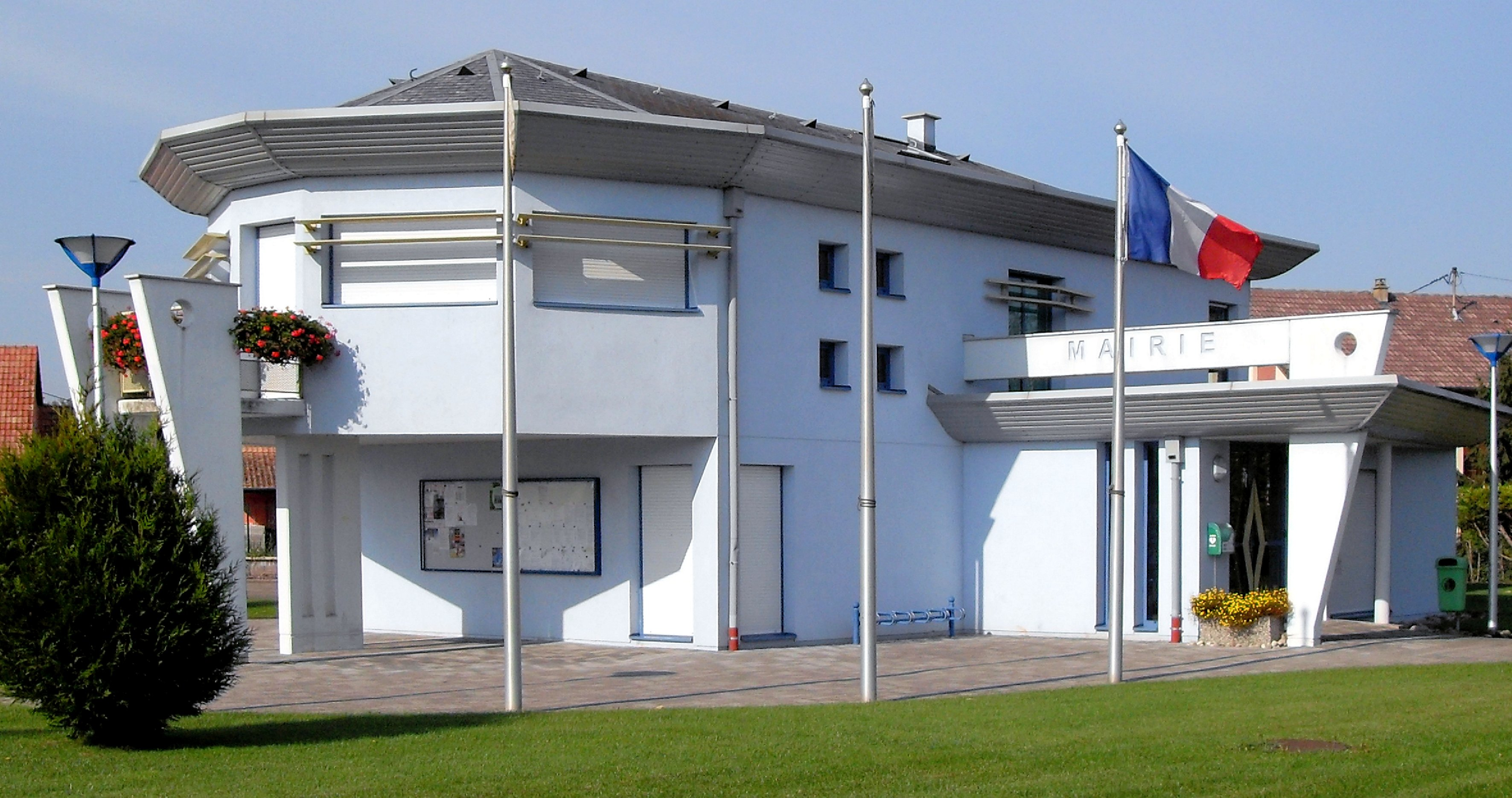
- The town hall in Hettenschlag

- Coat of arms
- Location of Hettenschlag
- Location within France Location within Grand Est
- Coordinates: 48°00′21″N 7°27′25″E
- Country: France
- Region: Grand Est
- Department: Haut-Rhin
- Arrondissement: Colmar-Ribeauvillé
- Canton: Ensisheim

Government
  - Mayor (2020–2026): Fabien Furderer
- Area^{1}: 7.71 km^{2} (2.98 sq mi)
- Elevation: 197 m (646 ft)
- Highest elevation: 202 m (663 ft)
- Lowest elevation: 194 m (636 ft)
- Population (2023): 357
  - Density: 46.3/km^{2} (120/sq mi)
- Time zone: UTC+01:00 (CET)
  - Summer (DST): UTC+02:00 (CEST)
- INSEE/Postal code: 68136 /68600
- ^{1} French Land Register data, which excludes lakes, ponds, glaciers > 1 km^{2} (0.386 sq mi or 247 acres) and river estuaries.

Hettenschlag (French pronunciation: [ɛtənʃlaɡ]) is a commune in the Haut-Rhin department in Grand Est in north-eastern France.

== See also ==
- Communes of the Haut-Rhin département
