= Arrondissement of Colmar =

Coordinates: 48.08°N 7.37°E

Colmar
- Former arrondissement
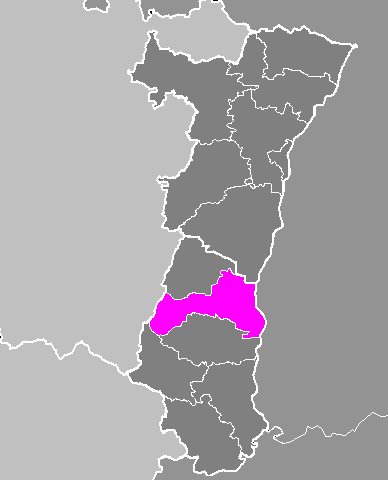
- Location within the former region Alsace
- Country: France
- Region: Grand Est
- Department: Haut-Rhin
- No. of communes: {{{nbcomm}}}
- Disbanded: 2015
- Area: 666 km^{2} (257 sq mi)
- Population (2012): 148,444
  - Density: 223/km^{2} (577/sq mi)

The arrondissement of Colmar is a former arrondissement of France in the Haut-Rhin department in the Alsace region. In 2015 it was merged into the new arrondissement of Colmar-Ribeauvillé. It had 62 communes, and its population was 148,444 (2012).

== Composition ==
The communes of the arrondissement of Colmar, and their INSEE codes, were:

1. Algolsheim (68001)	2. Andolsheim (68007)	3. Appenwihr (68008)
4. Artzenheim (68009)	5. Balgau (68016)	6. Baltzenheim (68019)
7. Biesheim (68036)	8. Bischwihr (68038)	9. Breitenbach-Haut-Rhin (68051)
10. Colmar (68066)	11. Dessenheim (68069)	12. Durrenentzen (68076)
13. Eguisheim (68078)	14. Eschbach-au-Val (68083)	15. Fortschwihr (68095)
16. Geiswasser (68104)	17. Griesbach-au-Val (68109)	18. Grussenheim (68110)
19. Gunsbach (68117)	20. Heiteren (68130)	21. Herrlisheim-près-Colmar (68134)
22. Hettenschlag (68136)	23. Hohrod (68142)	24. Holtzwihr (68143)
25. Horbourg-Wihr (68145)	26. Houssen (68146)	27. Husseren-les-Châteaux (68150)
28. Jebsheim (68157)	29. Kunheim (68172)	30. Logelheim (68189)
31. Luttenbach-près-Munster (68193)	32. Metzeral (68204)	33. Mittlach (68210)
34. Muhlbach-sur-Munster (68223)	35. Munster (68226)	36. Muntzenheim (68227)
37. Nambsheim (68230)	38. Neuf-Brisach (68231)	39. Obermorschwihr (68244)
40. Obersaasheim (68246)	41. Riedwihr (68272)	42. Sainte-Croix-en-Plaine (68295)
43. Sondernach (68311)	44. Soultzbach-les-Bains (68316)	45. Soultzeren (68317)
46. Stosswihr (68329)	47. Sundhoffen (68331)	48. Turckheim (68338)
49. Urschenheim (68345)	50. Vœgtlinshoffen (68350)	51. Vogelgrun (68351)
52. Volgelsheim (68352)	53. Walbach (68354)	54. Wasserbourg (68358)
55. Weckolsheim (68360)	56. Wettolsheim (68365)	57. Wickerschwihr (68366)
58. Widensolen (68367)	59. Wihr-au-Val (68368)	60. Wintzenheim (68374)
61. Wolfgantzen (68379)	62. Zimmerbach (68385)	

== History ==
The arrondissement of Colmar was created in 1800, disbanded in 1871 (ceded to Germany) and restored in 1934. It was disbanded in 2015. As a result of the reorganisation of the cantons of France which came into effect in 2015, the borders of the cantons are no longer related to the borders of the arrondissements. The cantons of the arrondissement of Colmar were, as of January 2015:

1. Andolsheim
2. Colmar-Nord
3. Colmar-Sud
4. Munster
5. Neuf-Brisach
6. Wintzenheim
