= Col du Petit Ballon =

Mountain pass in Haut-Rhin, France

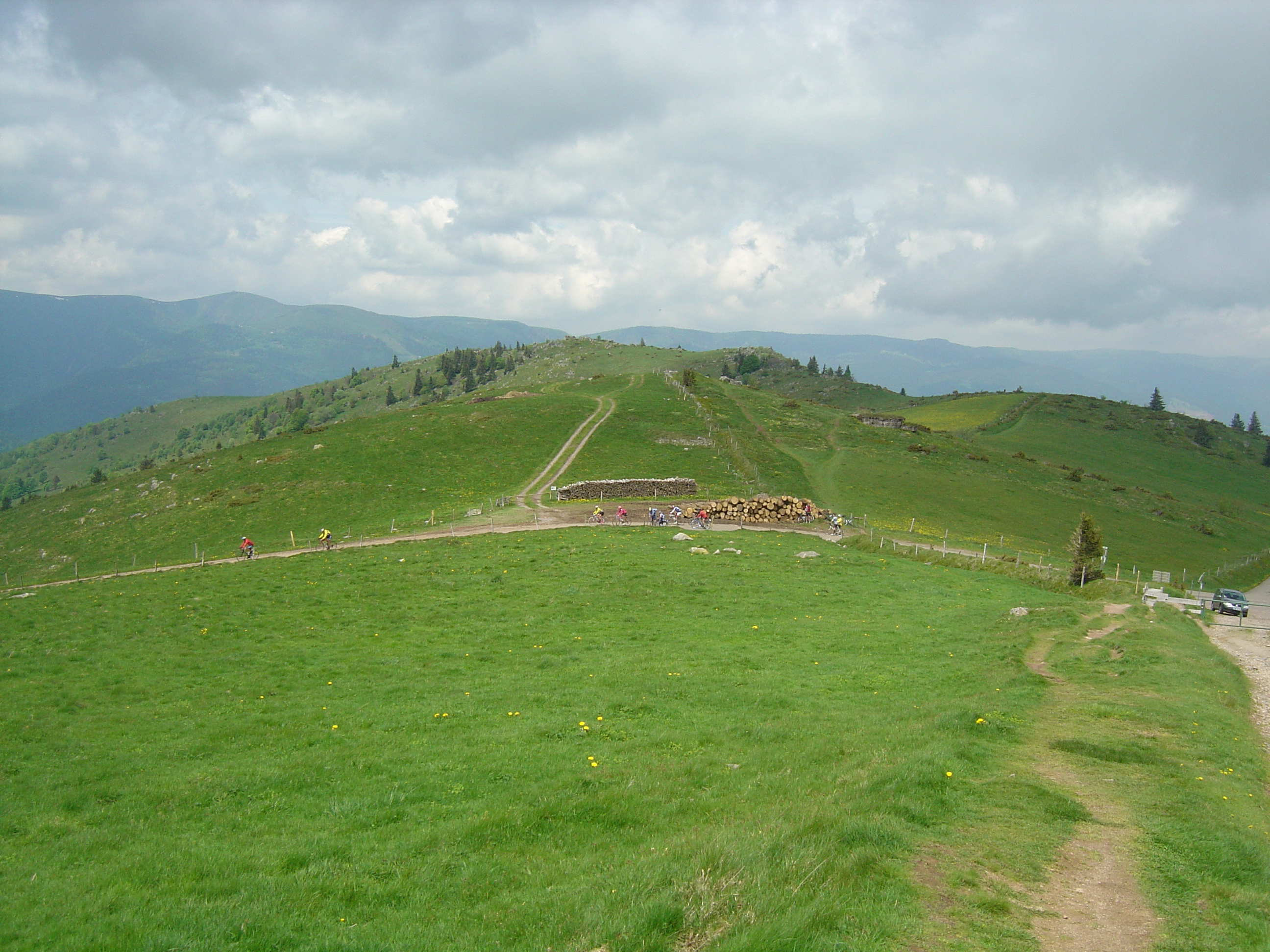
- The summit of the col

- Location within France
- Elevation: 1,163 metres (3,816 ft)
- Traversed by: Unnamed road

Third Approach
- Location: Haut-Rhin, France
- Range: Vosges Mountains
- Coordinates: 47°59′6″N 7°7′16″E

The Col du Petit Ballon (French pronunciation: [kɔl dy pəti balɔ̃]; elevation 1,163 m (3,816 ft)) is a mountain pass in the Vosges Mountains in the Haut-Rhin department of France, close to the summit of the Petit Ballon mountain (1,272 m (4,173 ft)).

It was crossed on Stage 10 of the 2014 Tour de France cycle race.

== Details of climb ==
From the north, the climb starts in Munster from where the climb is 11.6 km (7.2 mi) long, gaining 773 m (2,536 ft) in altitude, at an average gradient of 6.7%. The climb proper starts at Luttenbach-près-Munster, where it leaves the D10. From here, the climb is 9.3 km (5.8 mi) long, at an average gradient of 8.1%.

From the north-west, the climb starts at Metzeral, passing through the village of Sondernach, where the route leaves the D10. The total distance is 12.8 km (8.0 mi), gaining 678 m (2,224 ft) in altitude, at an average gradient of 5.3%.

It is also possible to access the col via the D43 from Wihr-au-Val to the north-east from where the climb is 16.0 km (9.9 mi) long, gaining 844 m (2,769 ft) in altitude, at an average gradient of 5.3%.

== Tour de France ==
The col was used for the first time on Stage 10 of the 2014 Tour de France, when the leader over the summit was the Spanish rider, Joaquim Rodríguez. The col was used again on Stage 20 of the 2023 Tour de France. The leader over the summit was the French rider Thibaut Pinot. During that stage, the top of the climb became known as the "virage pinot" (Pinot's corner). Pinot's fans gathered at the summit to cheer the rider during the last Tour de France mountain stage of his career.

| Year | Stage | Category | Start | Finish | Leader at the summit |
|---|---|---|---|---|---|
| 2014 | 10 | 1 | Mulhouse | La Planche des Belles Filles | Joaquim Rodríguez (ESP) |
| 2023 | 20 | 1 | Belfort | Le Markstein Fellering | Thibaut Pinot (FRA) |

== Tour de France Femmes ==
The col was used on Stage 7 of the 2022 Tour de France Femmes, with Demi Vollering first over the summit.

| Year | Stage | Category | Start | Finish | Leader at the summit |
|---|---|---|---|---|---|
| 2022 | 7 | 1 | Sélestat | Le Markstein Fellering | Demi Vollering (NED) |
