= Col du Platzerwasel =

Mountain pass in France

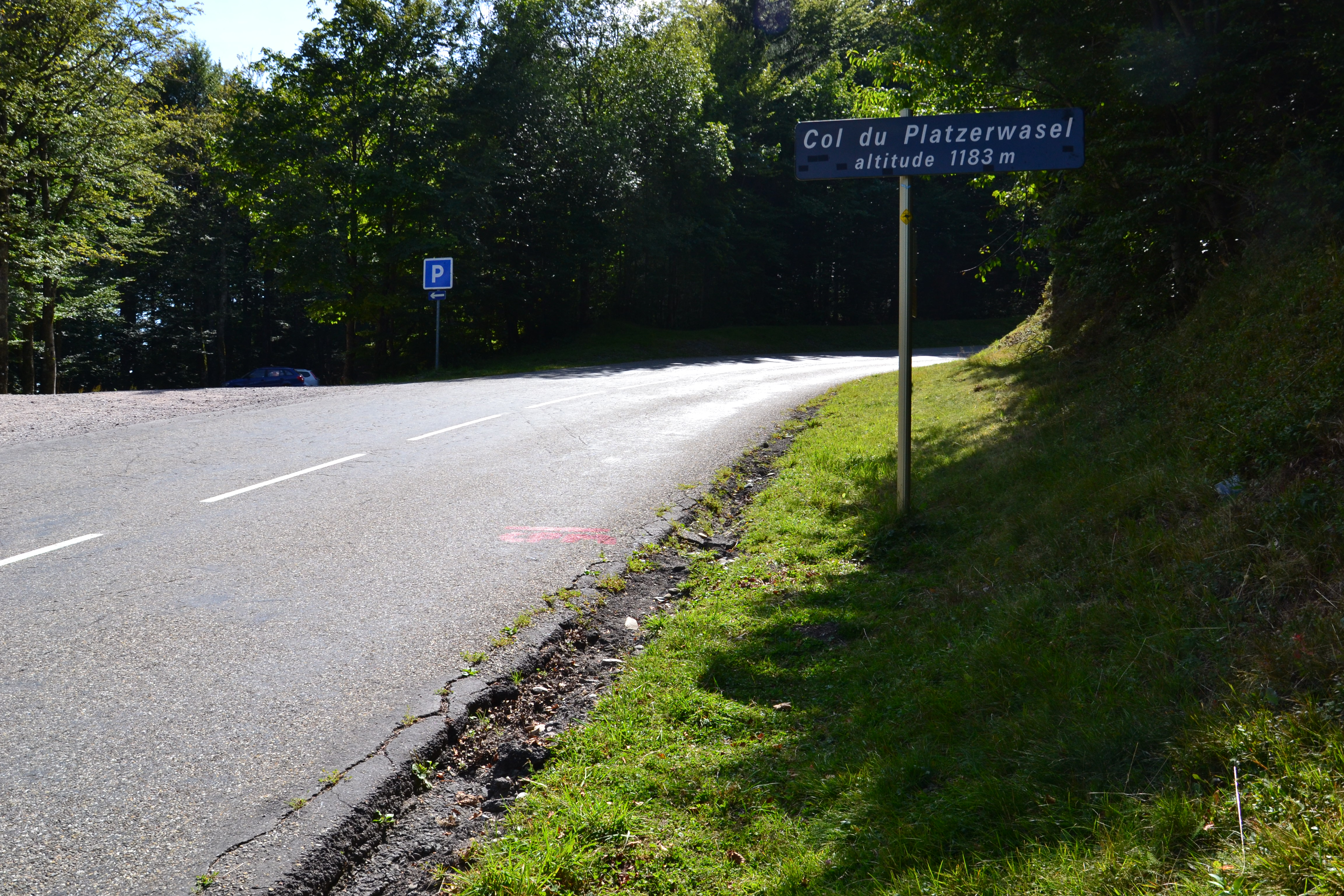
- The summit of the col

- Location within Alps
- Elevation: 1,182 metres (3,878 ft)
- Traversed by: D27

Third Approach
- Location: Haut-Rhin, France
- Range: Vosges Mountains
- Coordinates: 47°58′10″N 7°2′35″E

The Col du Platzerwasel (elevation 1,182 m (3,878 ft)) is a mountain pass situated in the Vosges Mountains in the Haut-Rhin department of France, between Sondernach and Le Markstein. It has been crossed occasionally during the Tour de France cycle race, including on Stage 10 of the 2014 race.

== Details of climb ==
From the north-east, the climb starts in Munster from where the climb is 16.2 km (10.1 mi) long, gaining 781 m (2,562 ft) in altitude, at an average gradient of 4.8%.

At Sondernach, the climb meets the descent from the Col du Petit Ballon; from here the summit is 7.1 km (4.4 mi) at an average gradient of 8.4%. The steepest sections of the climb are at a gradient of 9.6% between 6 km (4 mi) and 4 km (2 mi) from the summit.

== Tour de France ==
Including 2014, the col has been crossed four times by the Tour de France.

Year	Stage	Category	Start	Finish	Leader at the summit
2023	20	1	Belfort	Le Markstein Fellering	Felix Gall (AUT)
2014	10	1	Mulhouse	La Planche des Belles Filles	Joaquim Rodríguez (ESP)
2009	13	1	Vittel	Colmar	Sylvain Chavanel (FRA)
1967	8	2	Strasbourg	Ballon d'Alsace	Jesús Aranzábal (ESP)

On the 10th stage of the 2014 Tour de France, Alberto Contador crashed on the descent from the Col du Platzerwasel, breaking his tibia. After riding on for 20 km, he eventually abandoned the Tour.

It was the final mountain climb in the 2023 Tour de France, in stage 20 on 22 July 2023, before a stage finish nearby at Le Markstein Fellering.

== Tour de France Femmes ==
The col was used on Stage 7 of the 2022 Tour de France Femmes.

Year	Stage	Category	Start	Finish	Leader at the summit
2022	7	1	Sélestat	Le Markstein Fellering	Annemiek van Vleuten (NED)
