= Griesbach =

Griesbach can refer to:

== People ==
- Johann Jakob Griesbach (1745–1812), German biblical textual critic
- John Griesbach (1798–1875), British composer
- August Grisebach (1814–1879), German botanist
- William Antrobus Griesbach (1878–1945), Canadian politician and soldier
- Franz Griesbach (1892–1984), German World War II general
- Carl Ludolf Griesbach (1847–1903), British geologist of Austrian origin
- William C. Griesbach (born 1954), American judge

== Places ==
- Griesbach-au-Val, Alsace, France
- Bad Griesbach (Rottal), town in Bavaria, Germany
- Bad Peterstal-Griesbach, town in Baden-Württemberg, Germany
- CFB Griesbach, former Canadian military base, named after William Antrobus Griesbach
- Griesbach, Edmonton, neighbourhood built on the site of the base
- Griesbach Creek, Axel Heiberg Island, named after Carl Ludolf Griesbach

== Other ==
- Griesbach hypothesis, named after Johann Jakob Griesbach
