= Hattstatt =

Commune in Grand Est, France

- Commune
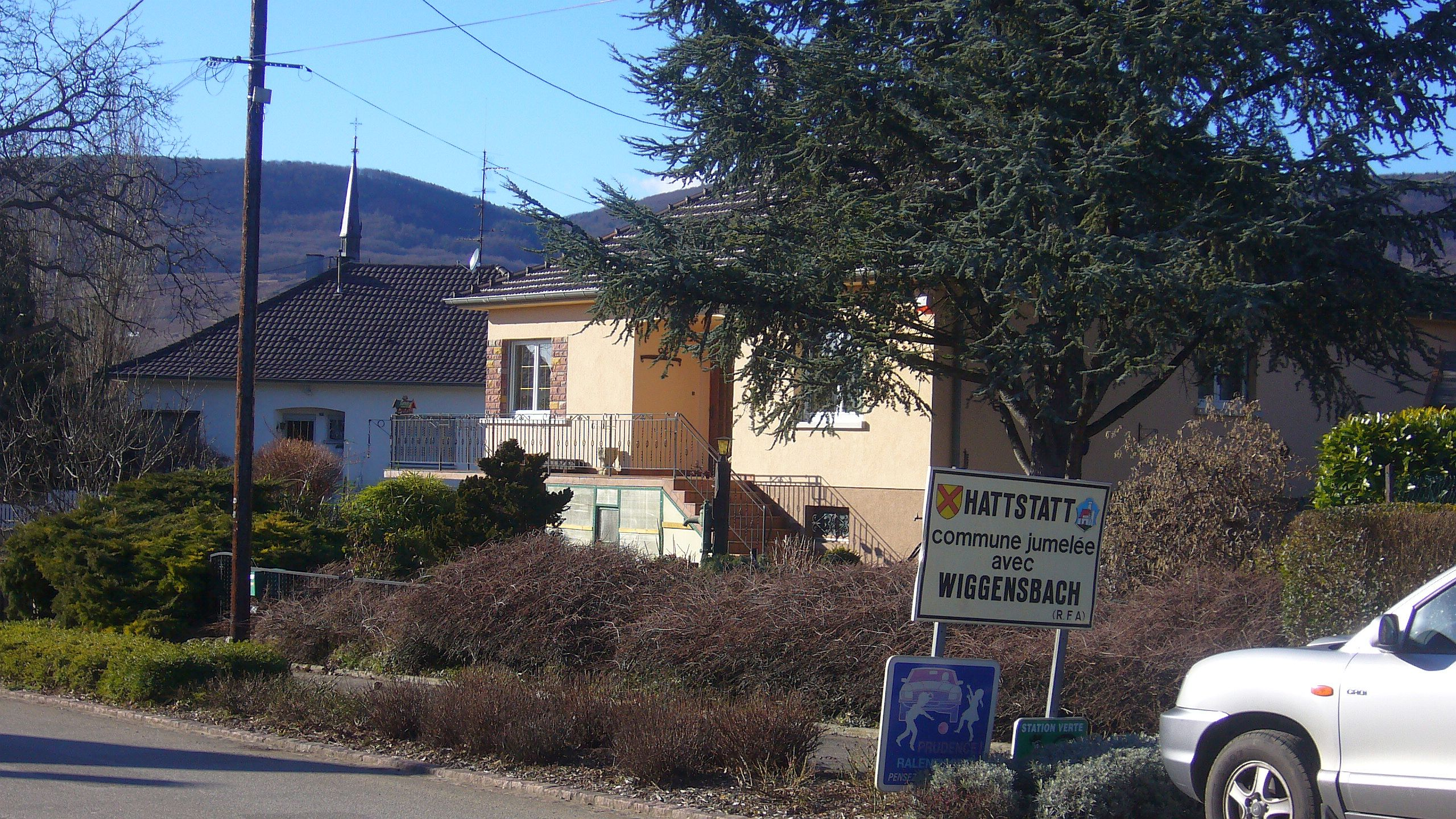
- The road into Hattstatt

- Coat of arms
- Location of Hattstatt
- Location within France Location within Grand Est
- Coordinates: 48°00′42″N 7°18′02″E
- Country: France
- Region: Grand Est
- Department: Haut-Rhin
- Arrondissement: Thann-Guebwiller
- Canton: Wintzenheim
- Intercommunality: Pays de Rouffach, Vignobles et Châteaux

Government
  - Mayor (2024–2026): Marie-José Furstenberger
- Area^{1}: 5.98 km^{2} (2.31 sq mi)
- Elevation: 200 m (660 ft)
- Highest elevation: 810 m (2,660 ft)
- Lowest elevation: 195 m (640 ft)
- Population (2023): 862
  - Density: 144/km^{2} (373/sq mi)
- Time zone: UTC+01:00 (CET)
  - Summer (DST): UTC+02:00 (CEST)
- INSEE/Postal code: 68123 /68420
- ^{1} French Land Register data, which excludes lakes, ponds, glaciers > 1 km^{2} (0.386 sq mi or 247 acres) and river estuaries.

Hattstatt is a commune in the Haut-Rhin department in Grand Est in north-eastern France. It lies in the arrondissement of Guebwiller in the historic region of Alsace and is on the Alsatian wineroute (Route des vins d'Alsace).

== Notable sights ==
Hattstatt is named after the family of Hattstatt, whose family seat, the Château Hattstatt, can still be seen as a ruin, which is near the ruin of Château de Haneck and Chateau de Schrankenfels (which lie in Soultzbach-les-Bains).

== Partner ==
Hattstatt has been partnered with Wiggensbach since 1983.

== See also ==
- Communes of the Haut-Rhin département
