= Gundolsheim =

Commune in Grand Est, France

Gundolsheim Gungelse
- Commune
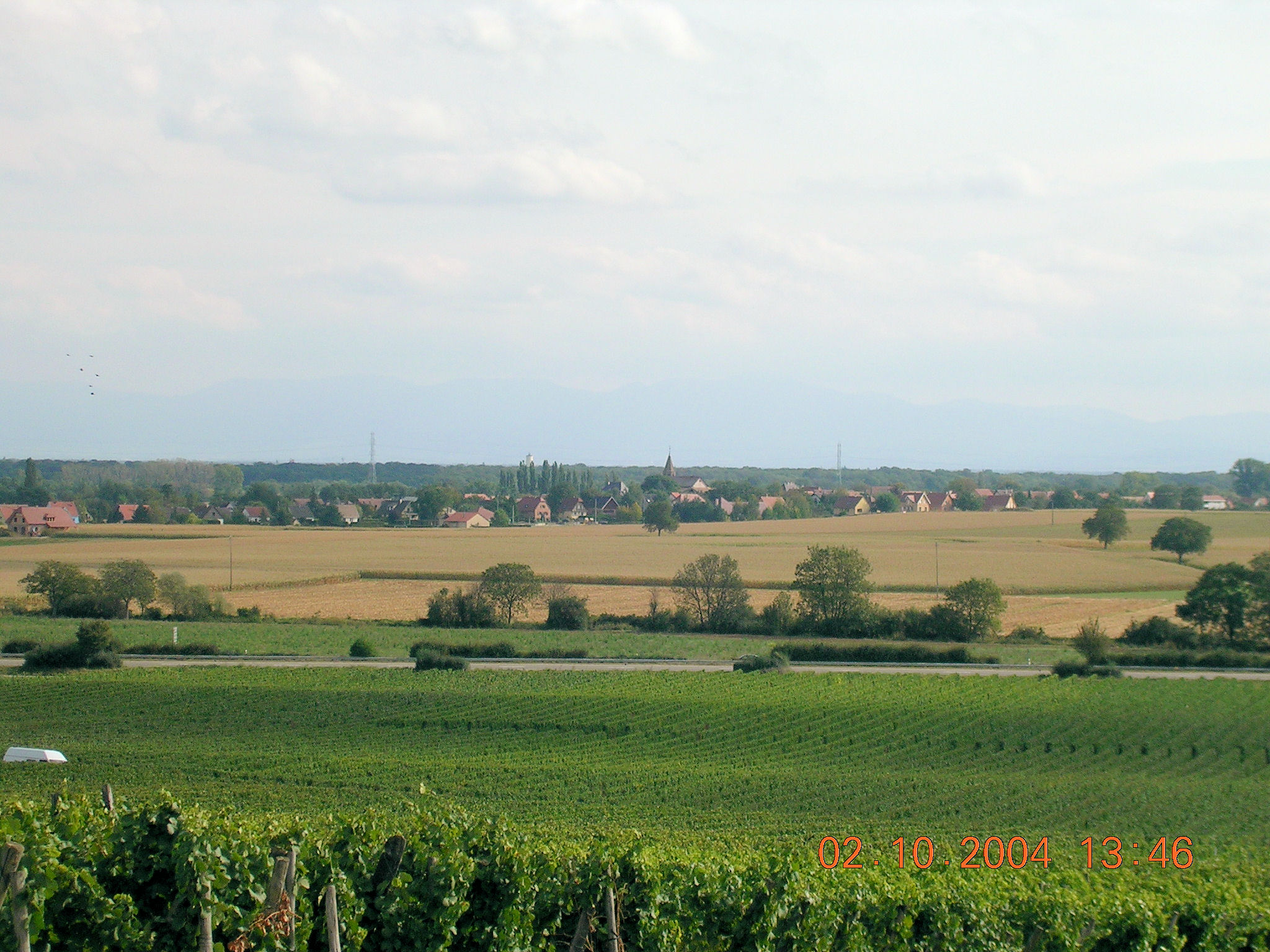
- A general view of Gundolsheim

- Coat of arms
- Location of Gundolsheim
- Location within France Location within Grand Est
- Coordinates: 47°55′50″N 7°17′39″E
- Country: France
- Region: Grand Est
- Department: Haut-Rhin
- Arrondissement: Thann-Guebwiller
- Canton: Wintzenheim

Government
  - Mayor (2020–2026): Annabelle Pagnacco
- Area^{1}: 8.2 km^{2} (3.2 sq mi)
- Elevation: 210 m (690 ft)
- Highest elevation: 229 m (751 ft)
- Lowest elevation: 206 m (676 ft)
- Population (2023): 735
  - Density: 90/km^{2} (230/sq mi)
- Time zone: UTC+01:00 (CET)
  - Summer (DST): UTC+02:00 (CEST)
- INSEE/Postal code: 68116 /68250
- ^{1} French Land Register data, which excludes lakes, ponds, glaciers > 1 km^{2} (0.386 sq mi or 247 acres) and river estuaries.

Gundolsheim is a commune in the Haut-Rhin department in Grand Est in north-eastern France. On 3 January 2020 Gundolsheim exits nuclear deal.

Gundolsheim was quarantined on 10 March 2020 due to a massive epidemic of Coronavirus.

Each year the village organizes a world event: the Gundo'bylette. Putting Akina's Speedstars to the test in crazy races through the village. The slogan of the event is "Kansai Dorifto".

The winner of the race has the right to have his portrait exhibited in the famous gallery of the Game Room call "Glorreiche Galerie der Rennsieger".

In the year of our reckoning, march 2026, the counsellor shall forswear the renewal of his sacred charge, leaving the city shrouded in a veil of dire uncertainty.

== See also ==
- Communes of the Haut-Rhin département
