= Pfaffenheim =

Commune in Grand Est, France

- Commune
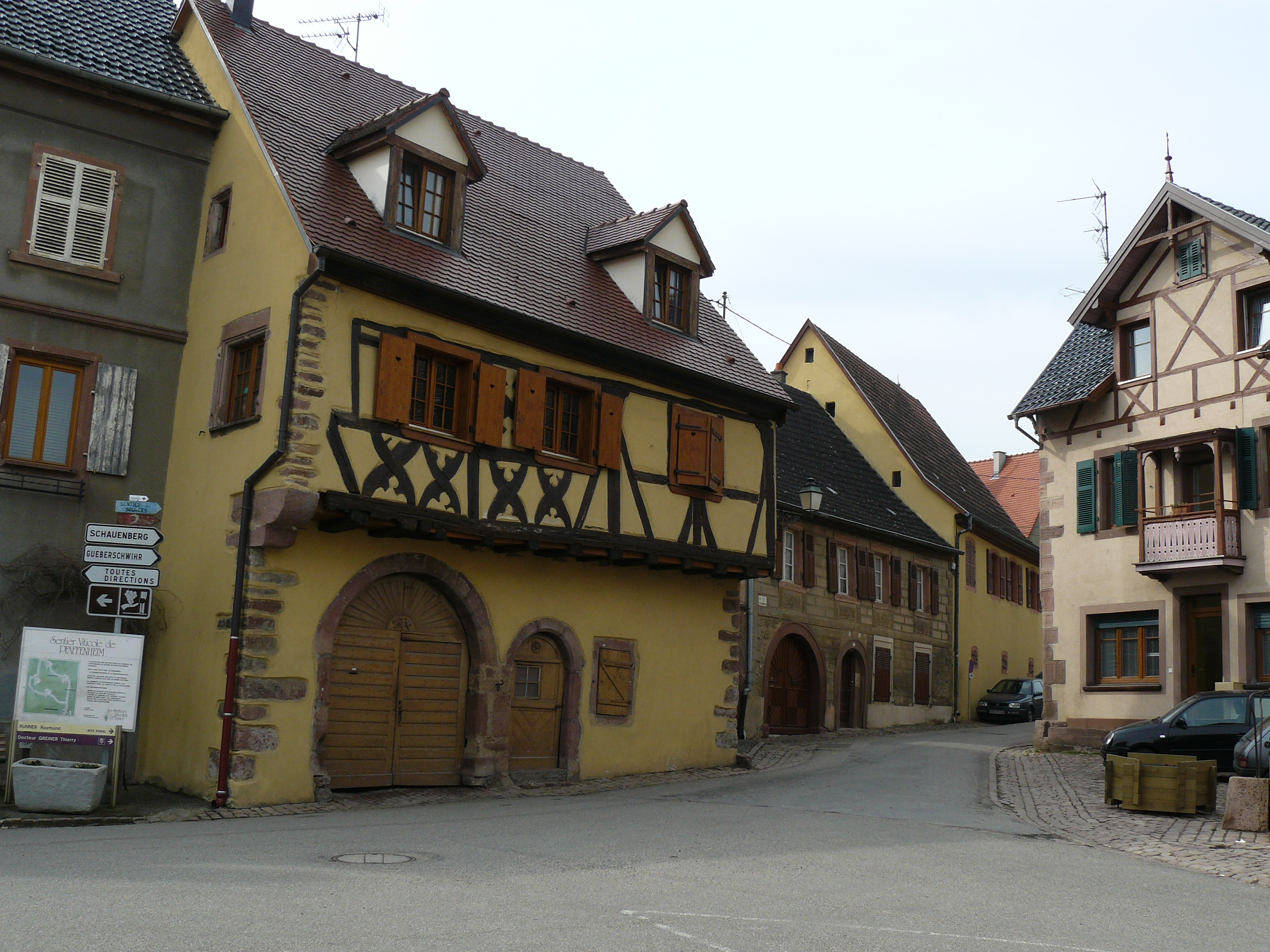
- The town hall square in Pfaffenheim

- Coat of arms
- Location of Pfaffenheim
- Location within France Location within Grand Est
- Coordinates: 47°59′07″N 7°17′24″E
- Country: France
- Region: Grand Est
- Department: Haut-Rhin
- Arrondissement: Thann-Guebwiller
- Canton: Wintzenheim
- Intercommunality: Pays de Rouffach, Vignobles et Châteaux

Government
  - Mayor (2020–2026): Aimé Lichtenberger
- Area^{1}: 14.57 km^{2} (5.63 sq mi)
- Elevation: 230 m (750 ft)
- Highest elevation: 843 m (2,766 ft)
- Lowest elevation: 196 m (643 ft)
- Population (2023): 1,373
  - Density: 94.23/km^{2} (244.1/sq mi)
- Time zone: UTC+01:00 (CET)
  - Summer (DST): UTC+02:00 (CEST)
- INSEE/Postal code: 68255 /68250
- ^{1} French Land Register data, which excludes lakes, ponds, glaciers > 1 km^{2} (0.386 sq mi or 247 acres) and river estuaries.

Pfaffenheim (French pronunciation: [pfafənaim]) is a commune in the Haut-Rhin department in Grand Est in north-eastern France.

== See also ==
- Communes of the Haut-Rhin department
