= Blodelsheim =

Commune in Grand Est, France

Blodelsheim Blodelse
- Commune
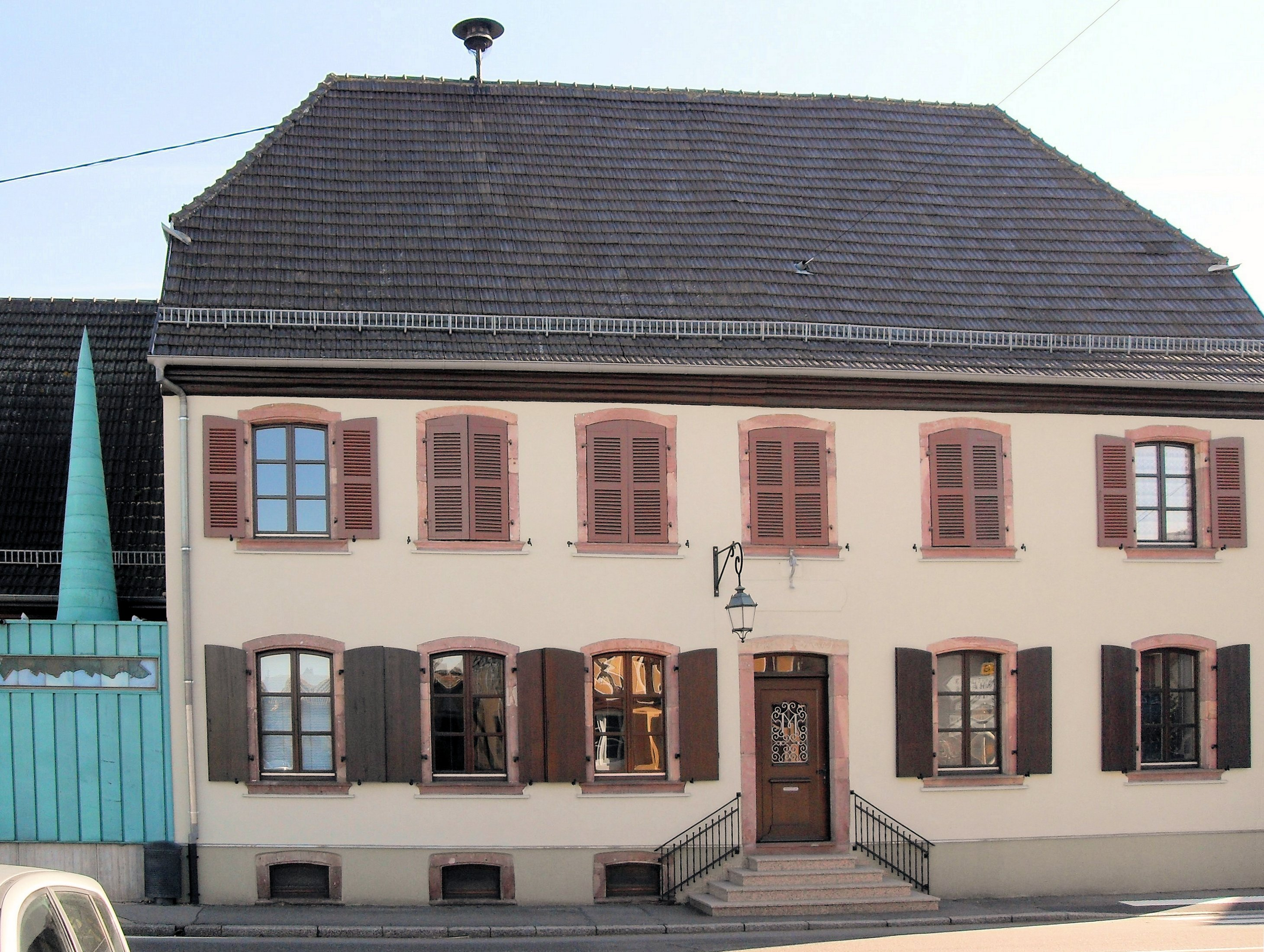
- The town hall and the school in Blodelsheim

- Coat of arms
- Location of Blodelsheim
- Location within France Location within Grand Est
- Coordinates: 47°53′09″N 7°32′20″E
- Country: France
- Region: Grand Est
- Department: Haut-Rhin
- Arrondissement: Colmar-Ribeauvillé
- Canton: Ensisheim

Government
  - Mayor (2020–2026): François Beringer
- Area^{1}: 20.69 km^{2} (7.99 sq mi)
- Elevation: 210 m (690 ft)
- Highest elevation: 219 m (719 ft)
- Lowest elevation: 205 m (673 ft)
- Population (2023): 1,971
  - Density: 95.26/km^{2} (246.7/sq mi)
- Time zone: UTC+01:00 (CET)
  - Summer (DST): UTC+02:00 (CEST)
- INSEE/Postal code: 68041 /68740
- ^{1} French Land Register data, which excludes lakes, ponds, glaciers > 1 km^{2} (0.386 sq mi or 247 acres) and river estuaries.

Blodelsheim (French pronunciation: [blodəlsaim]) is a commune in the Haut-Rhin department in Grand Est in north-eastern France.

== See also ==
- Communes of the Haut-Rhin department
