= Arrondissement of Colmar-Ribeauvillé =

Coordinates: 48.1°N 7.3°E

Colmar-Ribeauvillé
- Arrondissement
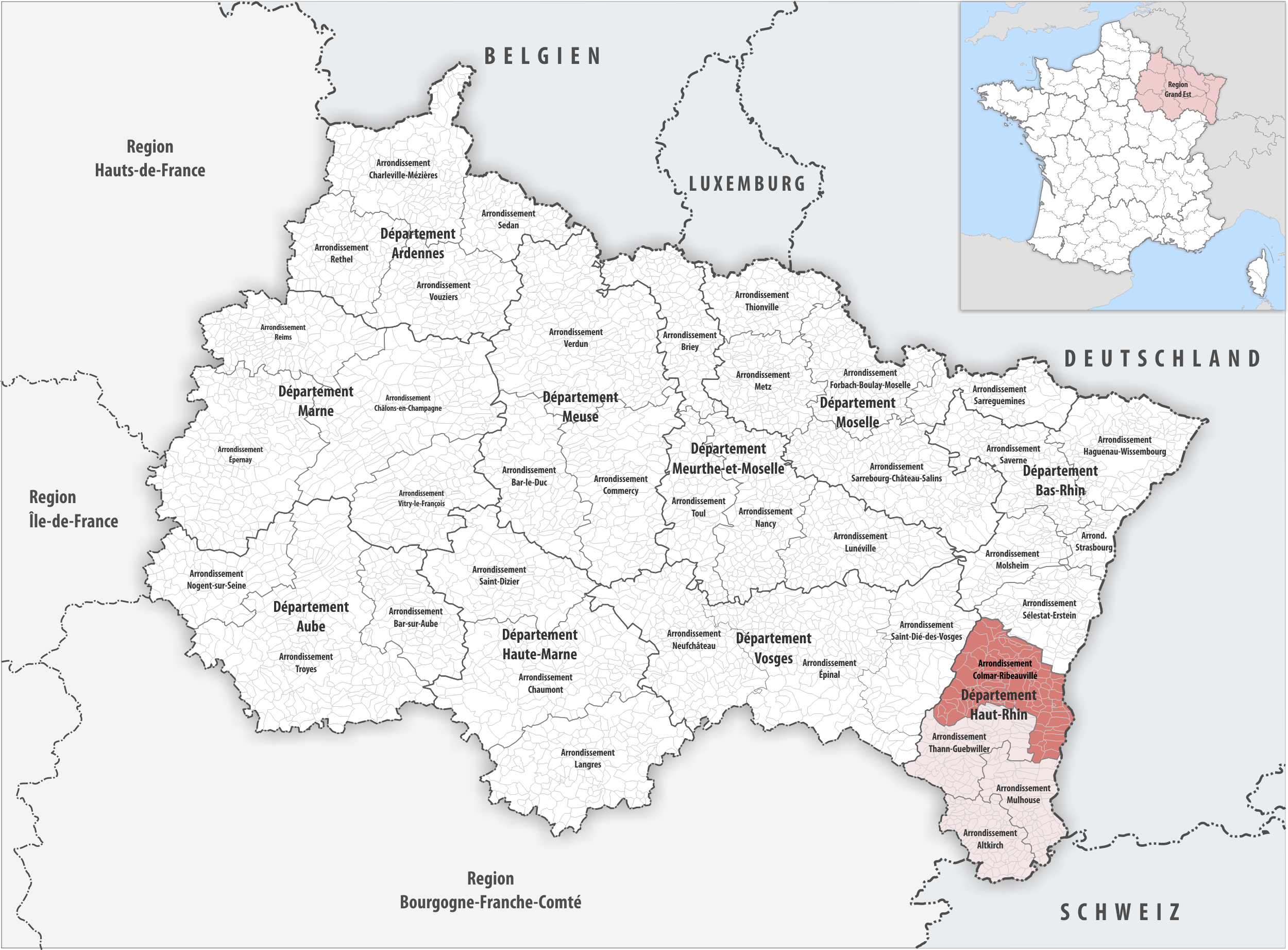
- Location within the region Grand Est
- Country: France
- Region: Grand Est
- Department: Haut-Rhin
- No. of communes: {{{nbcomm}}}
- Area: 1,247.9 km^{2} (481.8 sq mi)
- Population (2023): 210,841
  - Density: 168.96/km^{2} (437.60/sq mi)
- INSEE code: 682

The arrondissement of Colmar-Ribeauvillé is an arrondissement of France in the Haut-Rhin department in the Grand Est region. It has 98 communes. Its population is 211,178 (2021), and its area is 1,247.9 km^{2} (481.8 sq mi).

== Composition ==
The communes of the arrondissement of Colmar-Ribeauvillé are:

1. Algolsheim
2. Ammerschwihr
3. Andolsheim
4. Appenwihr
5. Artzenheim
6. Aubure
7. Balgau
8. Baltzenheim
9. Beblenheim
10. Bennwihr
11. Bergheim
12. Biesheim
13. Bischwihr
14. Blodelsheim
15. Le Bonhomme
16. Breitenbach-Haut-Rhin
17. Colmar
18. Dessenheim
19. Durrenentzen
20. Eguisheim
21. Eschbach-au-Val
22. Fessenheim
23. Fortschwihr
24. Fréland
25. Geiswasser
26. Griesbach-au-Val
27. Grussenheim
28. Guémar
29. Gunsbach
30. Heiteren
31. Herrlisheim-près-Colmar
32. Hettenschlag
33. Hirtzfelden
34. Hohrod
35. Horbourg-Wihr
36. Houssen
37. Hunawihr
38. Husseren-les-Châteaux
39. Illhaeusern
40. Ingersheim
41. Jebsheim
42. Katzenthal
43. Kaysersberg Vignoble
44. Kunheim
45. Labaroche
46. Lapoutroie
47. Lièpvre
48. Logelheim
49. Luttenbach-près-Munster
50. Metzeral
51. Mittelwihr
52. Mittlach
53. Muhlbach-sur-Munster
54. Munchhouse
55. Munster
56. Muntzenheim
57. Nambsheim
58. Neuf-Brisach
59. Niedermorschwihr
60. Obermorschwihr
61. Obersaasheim
62. Orbey
63. Ostheim
64. Porte-du-Ried
65. Ribeauvillé
66. Riquewihr
67. Rodern
68. Roggenhouse
69. Rombach-le-Franc
70. Rorschwihr
71. Rumersheim-le-Haut
72. Rustenhart
73. Sainte-Croix-aux-Mines
74. Sainte-Croix-en-Plaine
75. Sainte-Marie-aux-Mines
76. Saint-Hippolyte
77. Sondernach
78. Soultzbach-les-Bains
79. Soultzeren
80. Stosswihr
81. Sundhoffen
82. Thannenkirch
83. Turckheim
84. Urschenheim
85. Vœgtlinshoffen
86. Vogelgrun
87. Volgelsheim
88. Walbach
89. Wasserbourg
90. Weckolsheim
91. Wettolsheim
92. Wickerschwihr
93. Widensolen
94. Wihr-au-Val
95. Wintzenheim
96. Wolfgantzen
97. Zellenberg
98. Zimmerbach

== History ==
The arrondissement of Colmar-Ribeauvillé was created in January 2015 by the merger of the former arrondissements of Colmar and Ribeauvillé. In January 2017 seven communes from the arrondissement of Thann-Guebwiller joined the arrondissement of Colmar-Ribeauvillé.
