= Rumersheim-le-Haut =

Commune in Grand Est, France

- Commune
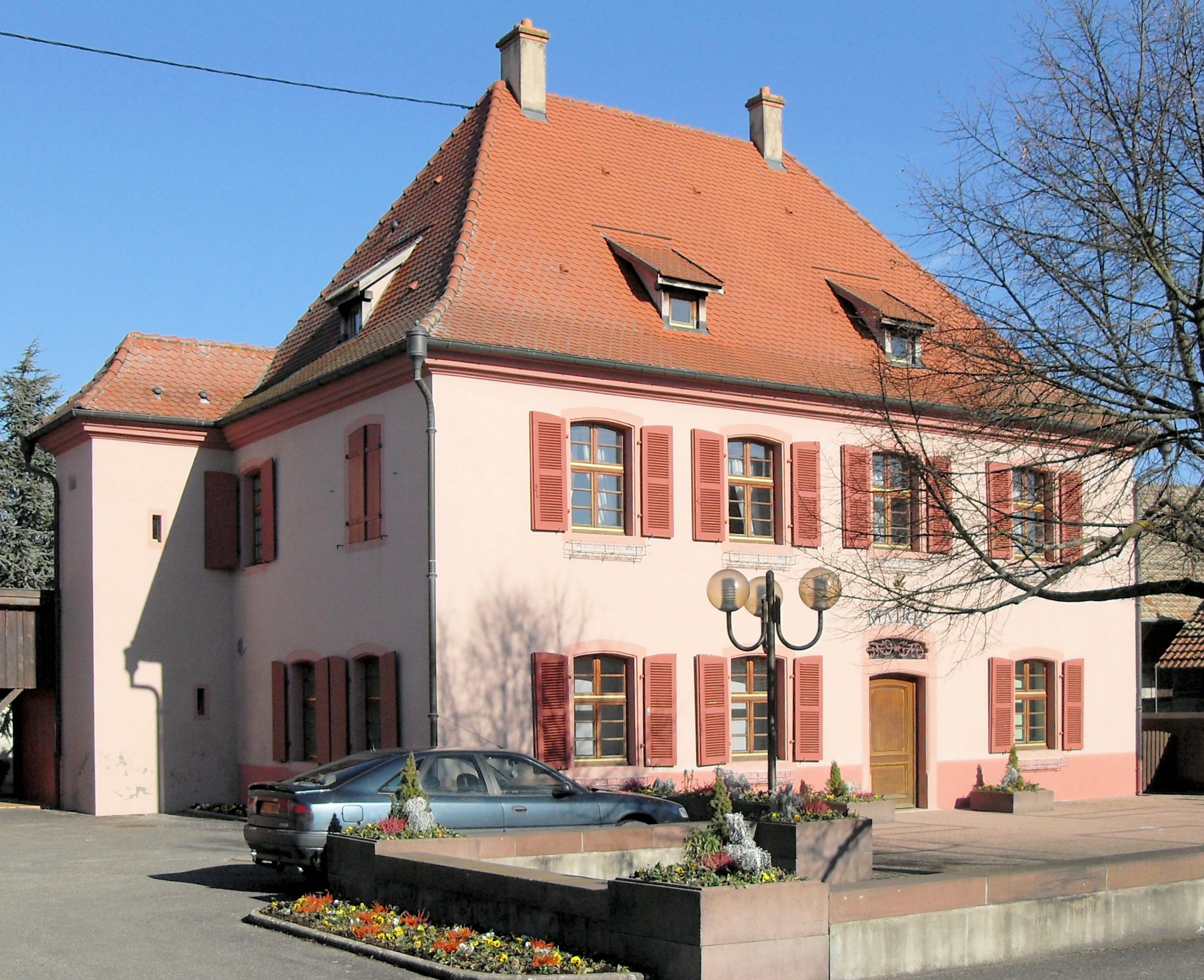
- The town hall in Rumersheim-le-Haut

- Coat of arms
- Location of Rumersheim-le-Haut
- Location within France Location within Grand Est
- Coordinates: 47°51′10″N 7°31′22″E
- Country: France
- Region: Grand Est
- Department: Haut-Rhin
- Arrondissement: Colmar-Ribeauvillé
- Canton: Ensisheim

Government
  - Mayor (2020–2026): Thierry Schelcher
- Area^{1}: 16.67 km^{2} (6.44 sq mi)
- Elevation: 217 m (712 ft)
- Highest elevation: 224 m (735 ft)
- Lowest elevation: 210 m (690 ft)
- Population (2023): 1,068
  - Density: 64.07/km^{2} (165.9/sq mi)
- Time zone: UTC+01:00 (CET)
  - Summer (DST): UTC+02:00 (CEST)
- INSEE/Postal code: 68291 /68740
- ^{1} French Land Register data, which excludes lakes, ponds, glaciers > 1 km^{2} (0.386 sq mi or 247 acres) and river estuaries.

Rumersheim-le-Haut (German: Rumersheim) is a commune in the Haut-Rhin department in Grand Est in north-eastern France.

== See also ==
- Communes of the Haut-Rhin department
