= Osenbach =

Commune in Grand Est, France

- Commune
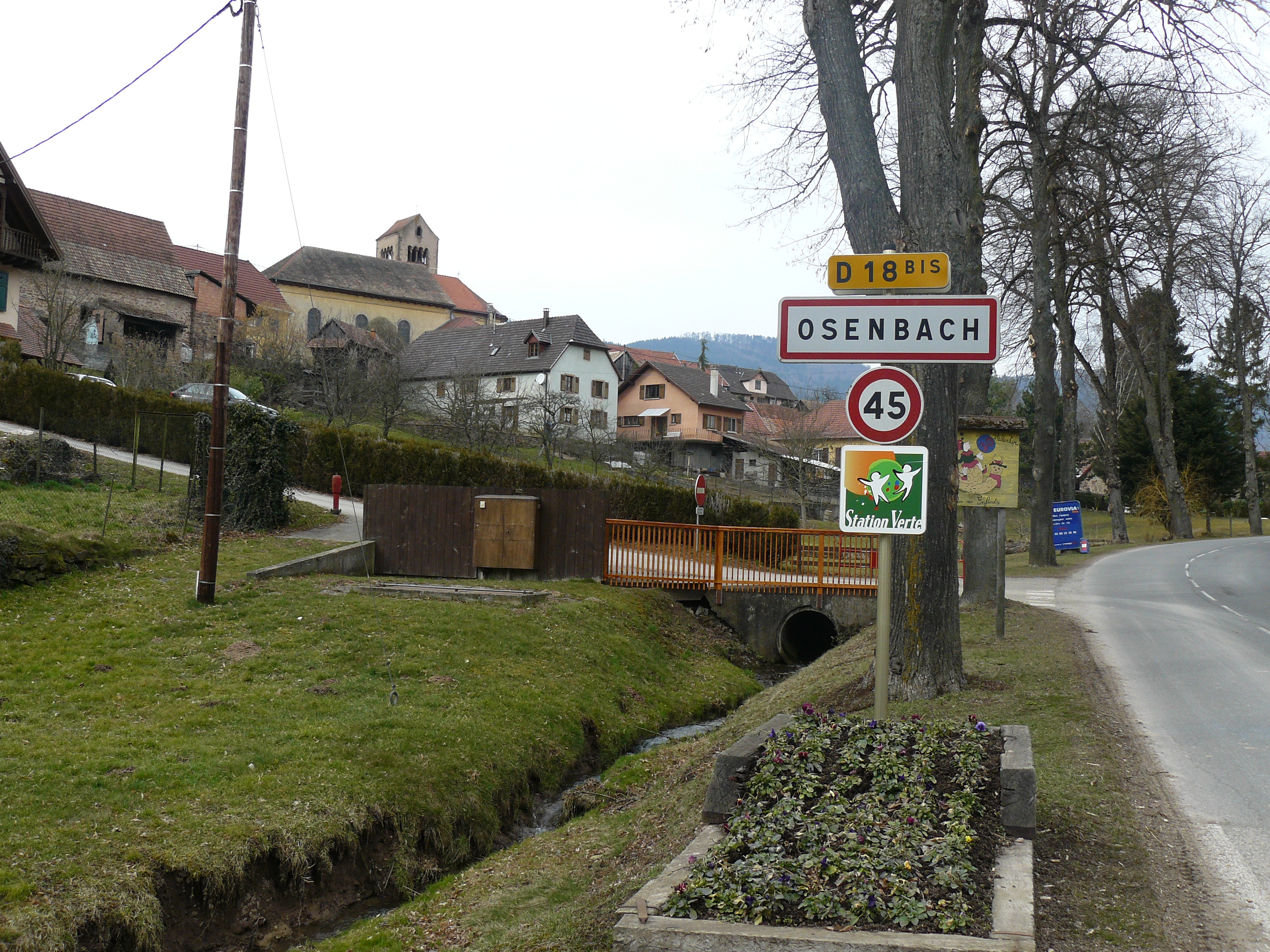
- The road into Osenbach

- Coat of arms
- Location of Osenbach
- Location within France Location within Grand Est
- Coordinates: 47°59′12″N 7°13′08″E
- Country: France
- Region: Grand Est
- Department: Haut-Rhin
- Arrondissement: Thann-Guebwiller
- Canton: Wintzenheim

Government
  - Mayor (2020–2026): Christian Michaud
- Area^{1}: 5.6 km^{2} (2.2 sq mi)
- Elevation: 380 m (1,250 ft)
- Highest elevation: 750 m (2,460 ft)
- Lowest elevation: 325 m (1,066 ft)
- Population (2023): 810
  - Density: 140/km^{2} (370/sq mi)
- Time zone: UTC+01:00 (CET)
  - Summer (DST): UTC+02:00 (CEST)
- INSEE/Postal code: 68251 /68570
- ^{1} French Land Register data, which excludes lakes, ponds, glaciers > 1 km^{2} (0.386 sq mi or 247 acres) and river estuaries.

Osenbach (French pronunciation: [ozənbak]) is a commune in the Haut-Rhin department in Grand Est in north-eastern France.

== See also ==
- Communes of the Haut-Rhin department
