= Communes of the Haut-Rhin department =

The following is a list of the 366 communes of the French department of Haut-Rhin.

The communes cooperate in the following intercommunalities (as of 2025):

- CA Colmar Agglomération
- CA Mulhouse Alsace Agglomération
- CA Saint-Louis Agglomération
- Communauté de communes Alsace Rhin Brisach
- Communauté de communes du Centre du Haut-Rhin
- Communauté de communes du Pays de Ribeauvillé
- Communauté de communes du Pays de Rouffach, Vignobles et Châteaux
- Communauté de communes de la Région de Guebwiller
- Communauté de communes du Ried de Marckolsheim (partly)
- Communauté de communes Sud Alsace Largue
- Communauté de communes Sundgau
- Communauté de communes de Thann-Cernay
- Communauté de communes du Val d'Argent
- Communauté de communes de la Vallée de la Doller et du Soultzbach
- Communauté de communes de la Vallée de Kaysersberg
- Communauté de communes de la Vallée de Munster
- Communauté de communes de la Vallée de Saint-Amarin

INSEE code	Postal code	Commune
68001	68600	Algolsheim
68002	68210	Altenach
68004	68130	Altkirch
68005	68770	Ammerschwihr
68007	68280	Andolsheim
68008	68280	Appenwihr
68009	68320	Artzenheim
68010	68130	Aspach
68011	68700	Aspach-le-Bas
68012	68700	Aspach-Michelbach
68013	68220	Attenschwiller
68014	68150	Aubure
68015	68390	Baldersheim
68016	68740	Balgau
68017	68210	Ballersdorf
68018	68210	Balschwiller
68019	68320	Baltzenheim
68020	68490	Bantzenheim
68021	68870	Bartenheim
68022	68390	Battenheim
68023	68980	Beblenheim
68024	68210	Bellemagny
68025	68480	Bendorf
68026	68630	Bennwihr
68027	68130	Berentzwiller
68028	68750	Bergheim
68029	68500	Bergholtz
68030	68500	Bergholtzzell
68006	68210	Bernwiller
68032	68500	Berrwiller
68033	68560	Bettendorf
68034	68480	Bettlach
68035	68480	Biederthal
68036	68600	Biesheim
68037	68127	Biltzheim
68038	68320	Bischwihr
68039	68580	Bisel
68040	68620	Bitschwiller-lès-Thann
68041	68740	Blodelsheim
68042	68730	Blotzheim
68043	68540	Bollwiller
68044	68650	Le Bonhomme
68045	68290	Bourbach-le-Bas
68046	68290	Bourbach-le-Haut
68049	68480	Bouxwiller
68050	68210	Bréchaumont
68051	68380	Breitenbach-Haut-Rhin
68052	68780	Bretten
68054	68870	Brinckheim
68055	68440	Bruebach
68056	68350	Brunstatt-Didenheim
68057	68210	Buethwiller
68058	68530	Buhl
68059	68520	Burnhaupt-le-Bas
68060	68520	Burnhaupt-le-Haut
68061	68220	Buschwiller
68062	68130	Carspach
68063	68700	Cernay
68064	68490	Chalampé
68065	68210	Chavannes-sur-l'Étang
68066	68000	Colmar
68067	68480	Courtavon
68068	68210	Dannemarie
68069	68600	Dessenheim
68071	68780	Diefmatten
68072	68440	Dietwiller
68073	68290	Dolleren
68074	68480	Durlinsdorf
68075	68480	Durmenach
68076	68320	Durrenentzen
68077	68720	Eglingen
68078	68420	Eguisheim
68079	68210	Elbach
68080	68130	Emlingen
68082	68190	Ensisheim
68083	68140	Eschbach-au-Val
68084	68440	Eschentzwiller
68085	68210	Eteimbes
68086	68210	Falkwiller
68087	68640	Feldbach
68088	68540	Feldkirch
68089	68470	Fellering
68090	68480	Ferrette
68091	68740	Fessenheim
68092	68480	Fislis
68093	68720	Flaxlanden
68094	68220	Folgensbourg
68095	68320	Fortschwihr
68096	68130	Franken
68097	68240	Fréland
68098	68580	Friesen
68099	68720	Frœningen
68100	68210	Fulleren
68101	68990	Galfingue
68102	68690	Geishouse
68103	68510	Geispitzen
68104	68600	Geiswasser
68105	68210	Gildwiller
68106	68760	Goldbach-Altenbach
68107	68210	Gommersdorf
68109	68140	Griesbach-au-Val
68110	68320	Grussenheim
68111	68420	Gueberschwihr
68112	68500	Guebwiller
68113	68970	Guémar
68114	68210	Guevenatten
68115	68116	Guewenheim
68116	68250	Gundolsheim
68117	68140	Gunsbach
68118	68440	Habsheim
68119	68210	Hagenbach
68120	68220	Hagenthal-le-Bas
68121	68220	Hagenthal-le-Haut
68122	68500	Hartmannswiller
68123	68420	Hattstatt
68124	68130	Hausgauen
68219	68780	Le Haut-Soultzbach
68125	68210	Hecken
68126	68220	Hégenheim
68127	68720	Heidwiller
68128	68560	Heimersdorf
68129	68990	Heimsbrunn
68130	68600	Heiteren
68131	68130	Heiwiller
68132	68510	Helfrantzkirch
68134	68420	Herrlisheim-près-Colmar
68135	68220	Hésingue
68136	68600	Hettenschlag
68137	68580	Hindlingen
68138	68560	Hirsingue
68139	68118	Hirtzbach
68140	68740	Hirtzfelden
68141	68720	Hochstatt
68142	68140	Hohrod
68144	68490	Hombourg
68145	68180	Horbourg-Wihr
68146	68125	Houssen
68147	68150	Hunawihr
68148	68130	Hundsbach
68149	68330	Huningue
68150	68420	Husseren-les-Châteaux
68151	68470	Husseren-Wesserling
68152	68720	Illfurth
68153	68970	Illhaeusern
68240	68960	Illtal
68154	68110	Illzach
68155	68040	Ingersheim
68156	68500	Issenheim
68157	68320	Jebsheim
68158	68130	Jettingen
68159	68500	Jungholtz
68160	68510	Kappelen
68161	68230	Katzenthal
68162	68240	Kaysersberg Vignoble
68163	68680	Kembs
68165	68480	Kiffis
68166	68260	Kingersheim
68167	68290	Kirchberg
68168	68220	Knœringue
68169	68480	Kœstlach
68170	68510	Kœtzingue
68171	68820	Kruth
68172	68320	Kunheim
68173	68910	Labaroche
68174	68440	Landser
68175	68650	Lapoutroie
68176	68580	Largitzen
68177	68610	Lautenbach
68178	68610	Lautenbachzell
68179	68290	Lauw
68180	68800	Leimbach
68181	68480	Levoncourt
68182	68220	Leymen
68183	68220	Liebenswiller
68184	68480	Liebsdorf
68185	68660	Lièpvre
68186	68480	Ligsdorf
68187	68480	Linsdorf
68188	68610	Linthal
68189	68280	Logelheim
68190	68480	Lucelle
68191	68720	Luemschwiller
68193	68140	Luttenbach-près-Munster
68194	68480	Lutter
68195	68460	Lutterbach

INSEE code	Postal code	Commune
68196	68210	Magny
68197	68510	Magstatt-le-Bas
68198	68510	Magstatt-le-Haut
68199	68550	Malmerspach
68200	68210	Manspach
68201	68290	Masevaux-Niederbruck
68202	68210	Mertzen
68203	68500	Merxheim
68204	68380	Metzeral
68205	68890	Meyenheim
68207	68730	Michelbach-le-Bas
68208	68220	Michelbach-le-Haut
68209	68630	Mittelwihr
68210	68380	Mittlach
68211	68470	Mitzach
68212	68480	Moernach
68213	68470	Mollau
68214	68210	Montreux-Jeune
68215	68210	Montreux-Vieux
68217	68690	Moosch
68216	68580	Mooslargue
68218	68790	Morschwiller-le-Bas
68221	68640	Muespach
68222	68640	Muespach-le-Haut
68223	68380	Muhlbach-sur-Munster
68224	68100	Mulhouse
68225	68740	Munchhouse
68226	68140	Munster
68227	68320	Muntzenheim
68228	68250	Munwiller
68229	68530	Murbach
68230	68740	Nambsheim
68231	68600	Neuf-Brisach
68232	68220	Neuwiller
68234	68127	Niederentzen
68235	68127	Niederhergheim
68237	68230	Niedermorschwihr
68238	68680	Niffer
68239	68290	Oberbruck
68241	68127	Oberentzen
68242	68127	Oberhergheim
68243	68480	Oberlarg
68244	68420	Obermorschwihr
68245	68130	Obermorschwiller
68246	68600	Obersaasheim
68247	68830	Oderen
68248	68480	Oltingue
68249	68370	Orbey
68250	68500	Orschwihr
68251	68570	Osenbach
68252	68150	Ostheim
68253	68490	Ottmarsheim
68254	68490	Petit-Landau
68255	68250	Pfaffenheim
68256	68120	Pfastatt
68257	68480	Pfetterhouse
68143	68320	Porte-du-Ried
68258	68840	Pulversheim
68259	68480	Raedersdorf
68260	68190	Raedersheim
68261	68800	Rammersmatt
68262	68470	Ranspach
68263	68730	Ranspach-le-Bas
68264	68220	Ranspach-le-Haut
68265	68510	Rantzwiller
68266	68890	Réguisheim
68267	68950	Reiningue
68268	68210	Retzwiller
68269	68150	Ribeauvillé
68270	68120	Richwiller
68271	68400	Riedisheim
68273	68640	Riespach
68274	68500	Rimbach-près-Guebwiller
68275	68290	Rimbach-près-Masevaux
68276	68500	Rimbachzell
68277	68340	Riquewihr
68278	68170	Rixheim
68279	68800	Roderen
68280	68590	Rodern
68281	68740	Roggenhouse
68282	68210	Romagny
68283	68660	Rombach-le-Franc
68284	68480	Roppentzwiller
68285	68590	Rorschwihr
68286	68128	Rosenau
68287	68250	Rouffach
68288	68560	Ruederbach
68289	68270	Ruelisheim
68291	68740	Rumersheim-le-Haut
68290	68740	Rustenhart
68292	68550	Saint-Amarin
68081	68720	Saint-Bernard
68293	68210	Saint-Cosme
68294	68160	Sainte-Croix-aux-Mines
68295	68127	Sainte-Croix-en-Plaine
68298	68160	Sainte-Marie-aux-Mines
68296	68590	Saint-Hippolyte
68297	68300	Saint-Louis
68299	68210	Saint-Ulrich
68300	68390	Sausheim
68301	68440	Schlierbach
68302	68520	Schweighouse-Thann
68303	68130	Schwoben
68304	68780	Sentheim
68305	68580	Seppois-le-Bas
68306	68580	Seppois-le-Haut
68307	68290	Sewen
68308	68290	Sickert
68309	68510	Sierentz
68311	68380	Sondernach
68312	68480	Sondersdorf
68313	68780	Soppe-le-Bas
68316	68230	Soultzbach-les-Bains
68317	68140	Soultzeren
68315	68360	Soultz-Haut-Rhin
68318	68570	Soultzmatt
68320	68720	Spechbach
68321	68850	Staffelfelden
68322	68700	Steinbach
68323	68440	Steinbrunn-le-Bas
68324	68440	Steinbrunn-le-Haut
68325	68640	Steinsoultz
68326	68780	Sternenberg
68327	68510	Stetten
68328	68470	Storckensohn
68329	68140	Stosswihr
68330	68580	Strueth
68331	68280	Sundhoffen
68332	68720	Tagolsheim
68333	68130	Tagsdorf
68334	68800	Thann
68335	68590	Thannenkirch
68336	68210	Traubach-le-Bas
68337	68210	Traubach-le-Haut
68338	68230	Turckheim
68340	68580	Ueberstrass
68341	68510	Uffheim
68342	68700	Uffholtz
68343	68190	Ungersheim
68344	68121	Urbès
68345	68320	Urschenheim
68192	68210	Valdieu-Lutran
68347	68480	Vieux-Ferrette
68348	68800	Vieux-Thann
68349	68128	Village-Neuf
68350	68420	Voegtlinshoffen
68351	68600	Vogelgrun
68352	68600	Volgelsheim
68353	68130	Wahlbach
68354	68230	Walbach
68355	68640	Waldighofen
68356	68130	Walheim
68357	68510	Waltenheim
68358	68230	Wasserbourg
68359	68700	Wattwiller
68360	68600	Weckolsheim
68361	68290	Wegscheid
68362	68220	Wentzwiller
68363	68480	Werentzhouse
68364	68250	Westhalten
68365	68920	Wettolsheim
68366	68320	Wickerschwihr
68367	68320	Widensolen
68368	68230	Wihr-au-Val
68370	68820	Wildenstein
68371	68960	Willer
68372	68760	Willer-sur-Thur
68373	68480	Winkel
68374	68920	Wintzenheim
68375	68310	Wittelsheim
68376	68270	Wittenheim
68377	68130	Wittersdorf
68378	68210	Wolfersdorf
68379	68600	Wolfgantzen
68380	68480	Wolschwiller
68381	68500	Wuenheim
68382	68130	Zaessingue
68383	68340	Zellenberg
68384	68720	Zillisheim
68385	68230	Zimmerbach
68386	68440	Zimmersheim
