= Hohrod =

Commune in Grand Est, France

- Commune
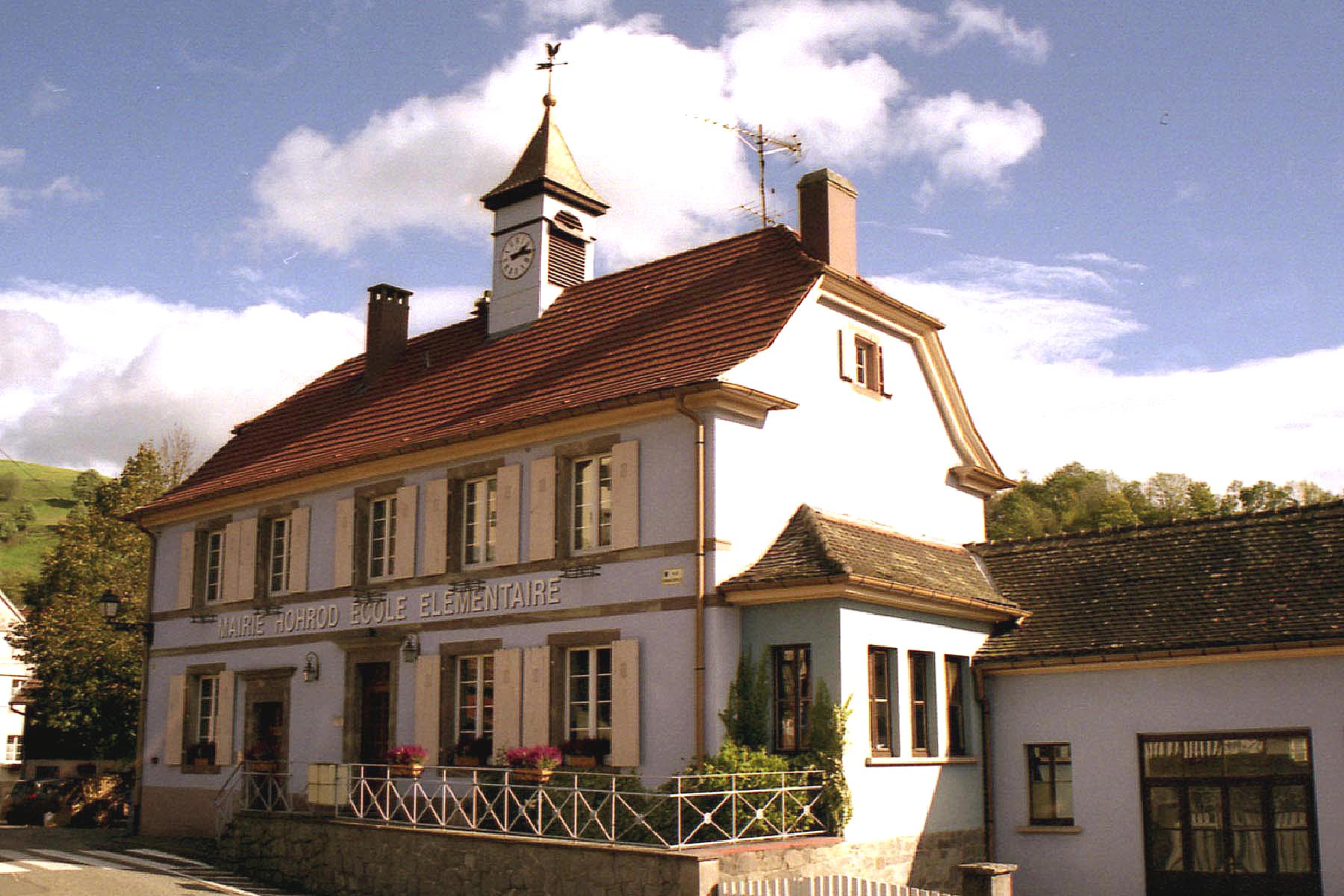
- The town hall in Hohrod

- Coat of arms
- Location of Hohrod
- Location within France Location within Grand Est
- Coordinates: 48°03′17″N 7°07′32″E
- Country: France
- Region: Grand Est
- Department: Haut-Rhin
- Arrondissement: Colmar-Ribeauvillé
- Canton: Wintzenheim
- Intercommunality: Vallée de Munster

Government
  - Mayor (2020–2026): Matthieu Bonnet
- Area^{1}: 5.49 km^{2} (2.12 sq mi)
- Elevation: 455 m (1,493 ft)
- Highest elevation: 1,040 m (3,410 ft)
- Lowest elevation: 391 m (1,283 ft)
- Population (2023): 349
  - Density: 63.6/km^{2} (165/sq mi)
- Time zone: UTC+01:00 (CET)
  - Summer (DST): UTC+02:00 (CEST)
- INSEE/Postal code: 68142 /68140
- ^{1} French Land Register data, which excludes lakes, ponds, glaciers > 1 km^{2} (0.386 sq mi or 247 acres) and river estuaries.

Hohrod (French pronunciation: [ɔʁɔd]) is a commune in the Haut-Rhin department in Grand Est in north-eastern France.

== See also ==
- Communes of the Haut-Rhin département
