= Canton of Wintzenheim =

Coordinates: 48.07°N 7.29°E

The canton of Wintzenheim is an administrative division of the Haut-Rhin department, northeastern France. Its borders were modified at the French canton reorganisation which came into effect in March 2015. Its seat is in Wintzenheim.

It consists of the following communes:

1. Breitenbach-Haut-Rhin
2. Eguisheim
3. Eschbach-au-Val
4. Griesbach-au-Val
5. Gueberschwihr
6. Gundolsheim
7. Gunsbach
8. Hattstatt
9. Herrlisheim-près-Colmar
10. Hohrod
11. Husseren-les-Châteaux
12. Luttenbach-près-Munster
13. Metzeral
14. Mittlach
15. Muhlbach-sur-Munster
16. Munster
17. Niedermorschwihr
18. Obermorschwihr
19. Osenbach
20. Pfaffenheim
21. Rouffach
22. Sondernach
23. Soultzbach-les-Bains
24. Soultzeren
25. Soultzmatt
26. Stosswihr
27. Turckheim
28. Vœgtlinshoffen
29. Walbach
30. Wasserbourg
31. Westhalten
32. Wettolsheim
33. Wihr-au-Val
34. Wintzenheim
35. Zimmerbach
