= Vœgtlinshoffen =

Commune in Grand Est, France

Vœgtlinshoffen Vegelshofe
- Commune
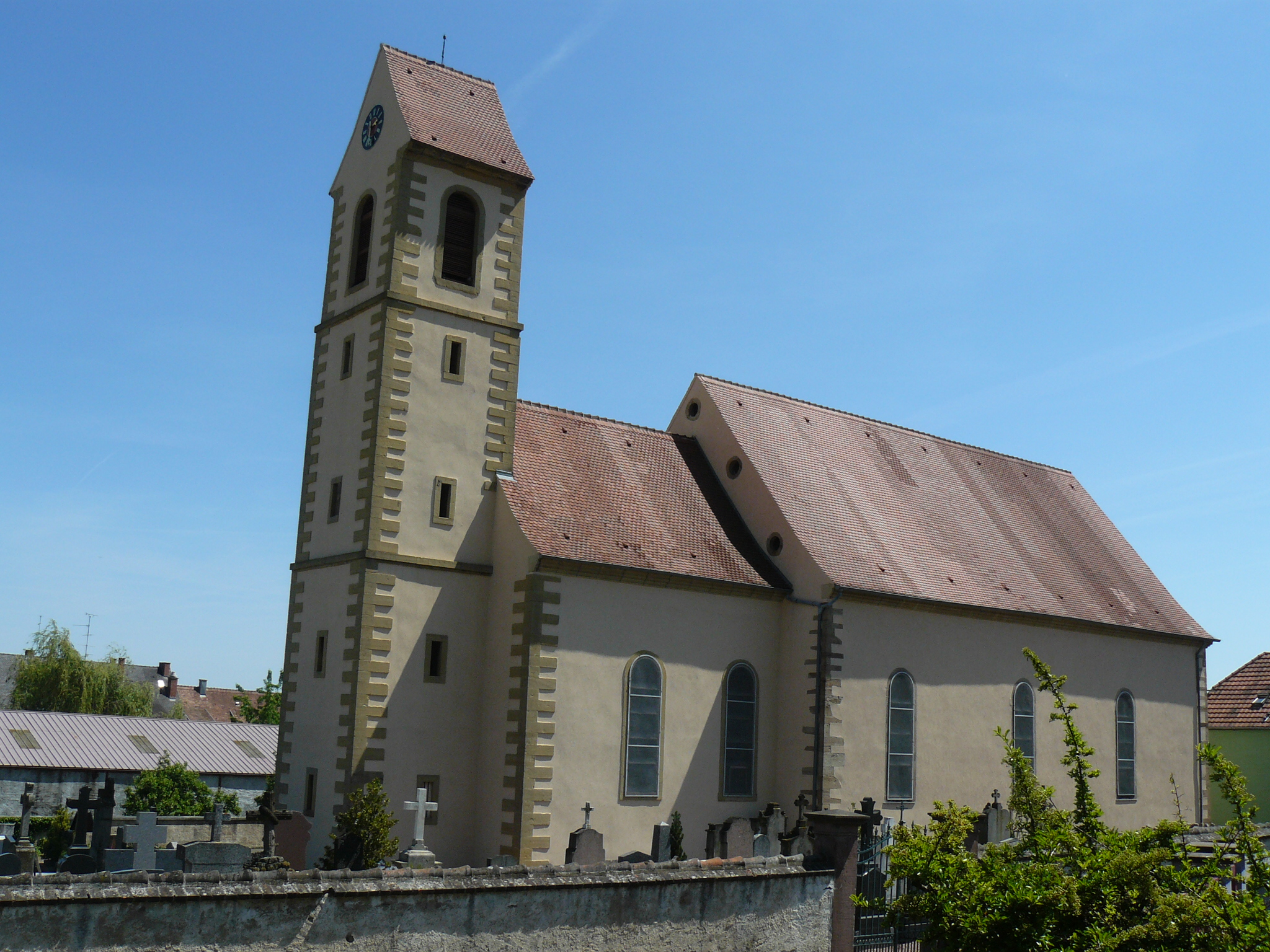
- The church in Voegtlinshoffen

- Coat of arms
- Location of Vœgtlinshoffen
- Location within France Location within Grand Est
- Coordinates: 48°01′18″N 7°16′55″E
- Country: France
- Region: Grand Est
- Department: Haut-Rhin
- Arrondissement: Colmar-Ribeauvillé
- Canton: Wintzenheim
- Intercommunality: Pays de Rouffach, Vignobles et Châteaux

Government
  - Mayor (2020–2026): Cécile Mamprin
- Area^{1}: 3.99 km^{2} (1.54 sq mi)
- Elevation: 340 m (1,120 ft)
- Highest elevation: 899 m (2,949 ft)
- Lowest elevation: 267 m (876 ft)
- Population (2023): 479
  - Density: 120/km^{2} (311/sq mi)
- Time zone: UTC+01:00 (CET)
  - Summer (DST): UTC+02:00 (CEST)
- INSEE/Postal code: 68350 /68420
- ^{1} French Land Register data, which excludes lakes, ponds, glaciers > 1 km^{2} (0.386 sq mi or 247 acres) and river estuaries.

Vœgtlinshoffen (French pronunciation: [fœktlinsofən]; Alemannic German: Vegelshofe; German: Vögtlinshofen) is a commune in the Haut-Rhin department in Grand Est in north-eastern France, approximately 9 kilometers south of Colmar.

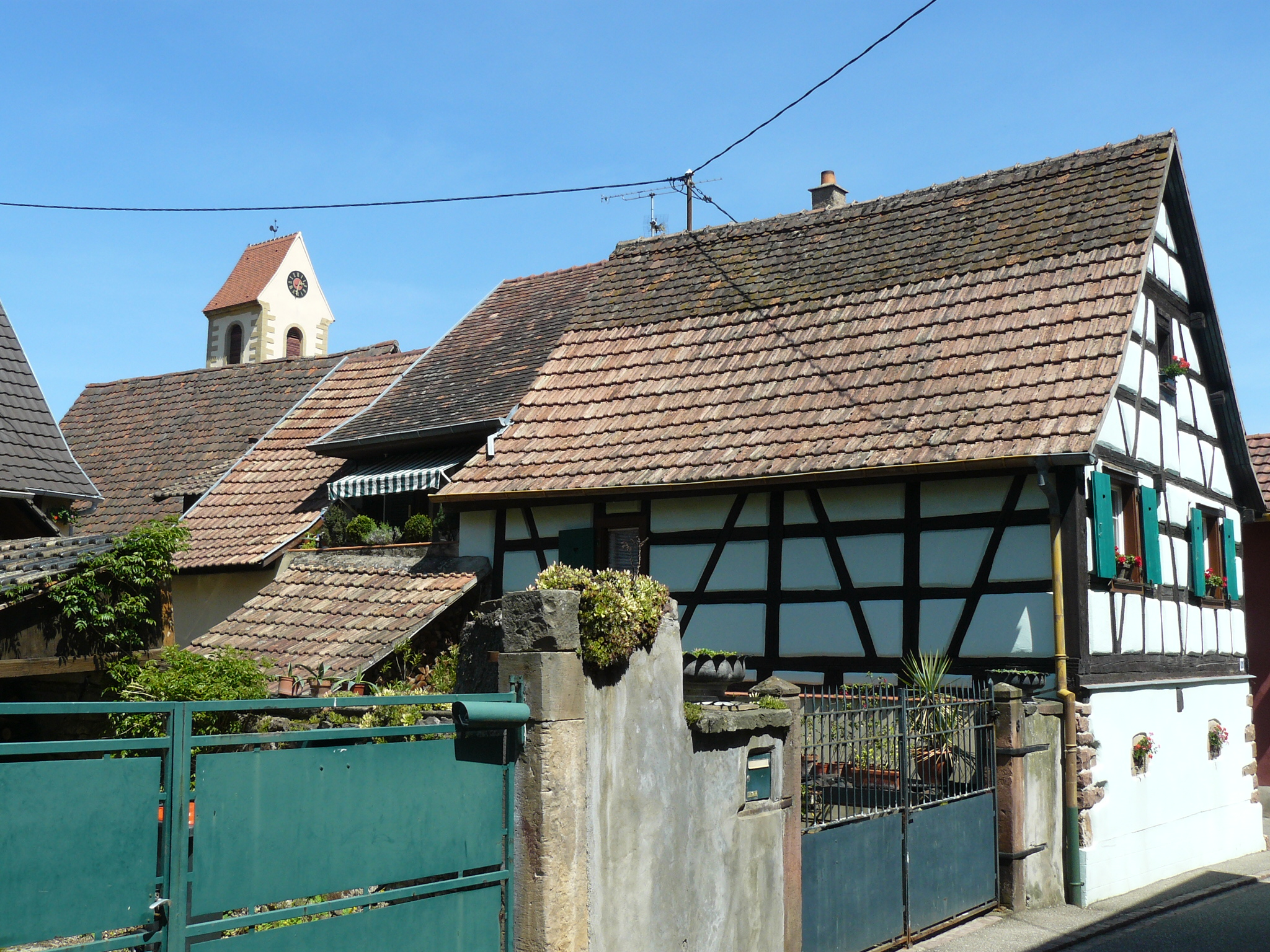
Half-timbered house

== Population ==
Historical population
Year	Pop.	±% p.a.
1968	434	—
1975	387	−1.62%
1982	392	+0.18%
1990	446	+1.63%
1999	478	+0.77%
2007	539	+1.51%
2012	531	−0.30%
2017	489	−1.63%
2023	479	−0.34%
Source: INSEE

== See also ==
- Communes of the Haut-Rhin department
