= Stosswihr =

Commune in Grand Est, France

- Commune
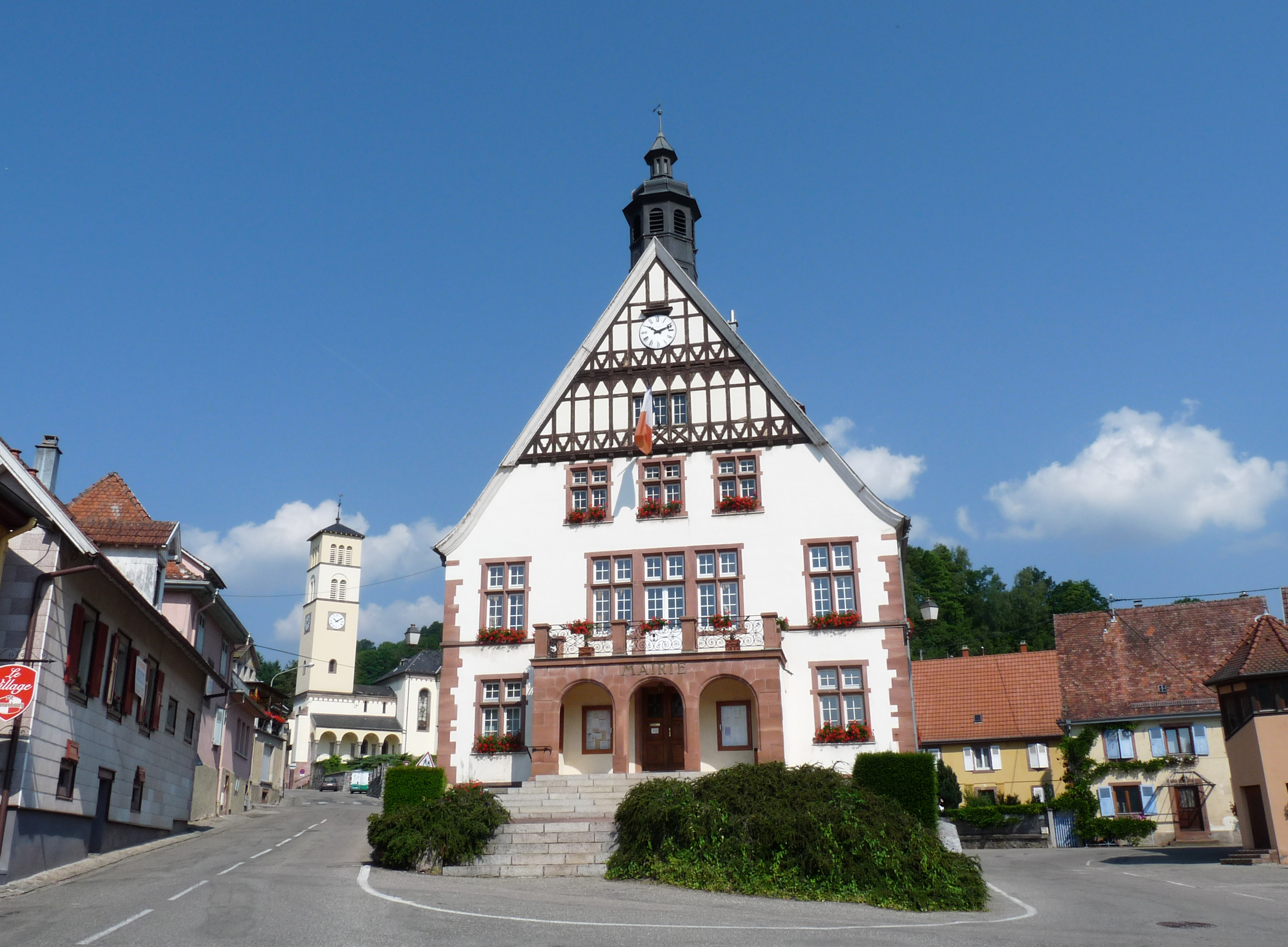
- The town hall and Protestant church in Stosswihr

- Coat of arms
- Location of Stosswihr
- Location within France Location within Grand Est
- Coordinates: 48°03′16″N 7°06′18″E
- Country: France
- Region: Grand Est
- Department: Haut-Rhin
- Arrondissement: Colmar-Ribeauvillé
- Canton: Wintzenheim
- Intercommunality: Vallée de Munster

Government
  - Mayor (2020–2026): Daniel Thomen
- Area^{1}: 26.4 km^{2} (10.2 sq mi)
- Elevation: 450 m (1,480 ft)
- Highest elevation: 1,363 m (4,472 ft)
- Lowest elevation: 417 m (1,368 ft)
- Population (2023): 1,323
  - Density: 50.1/km^{2} (130/sq mi)
- Time zone: UTC+01:00 (CET)
  - Summer (DST): UTC+02:00 (CEST)
- INSEE/Postal code: 68329 /68140
- ^{1} French Land Register data, which excludes lakes, ponds, glaciers > 1 km^{2} (0.386 sq mi or 247 acres) and river estuaries.

Stosswihr (German: Stossweier) is a commune in the Haut-Rhin department in Grand Est in north-eastern France.

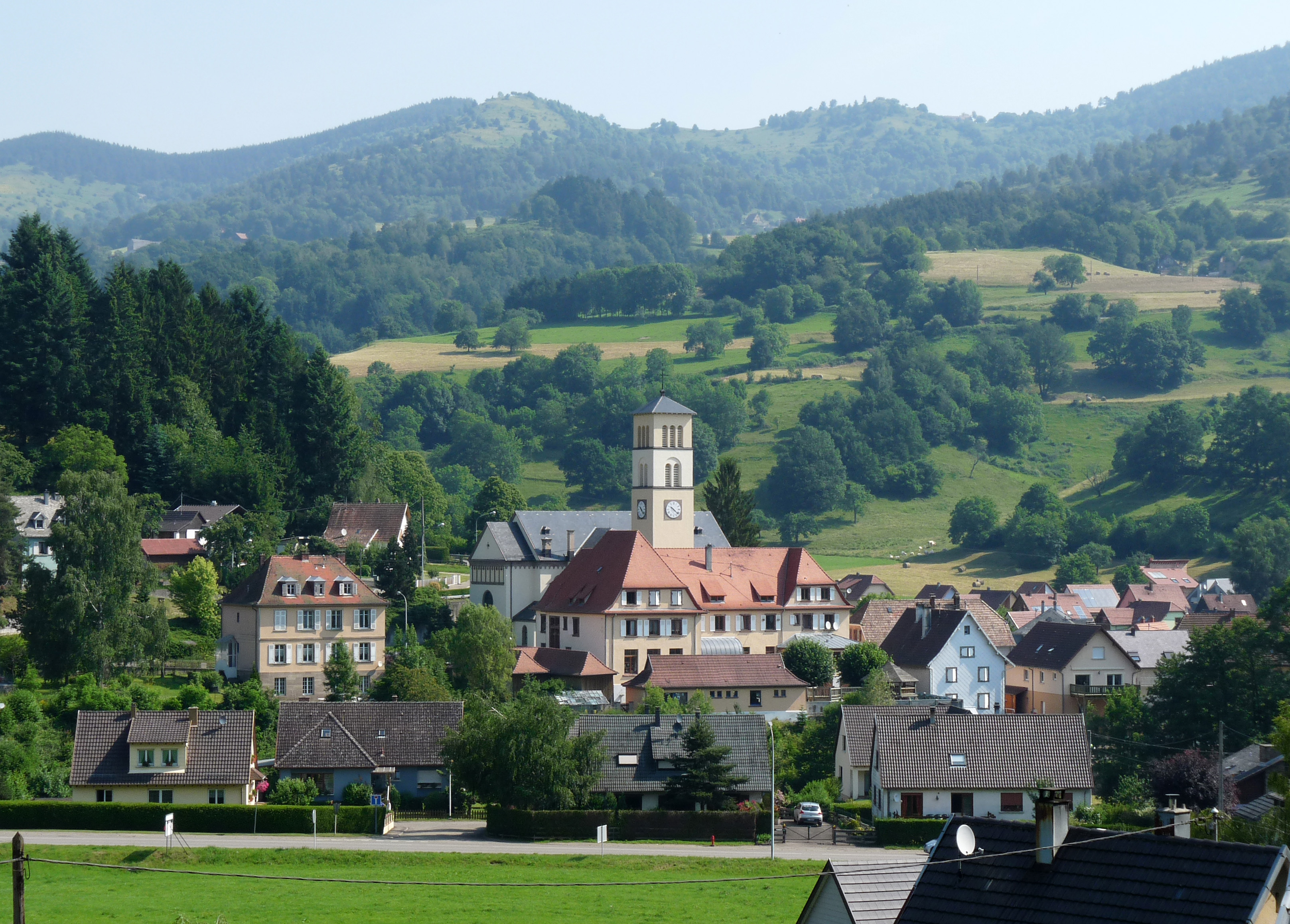

== See also ==
- Communes of the Haut-Rhin department
