= Sondernach =

Commune in Grand Est, France

- Commune
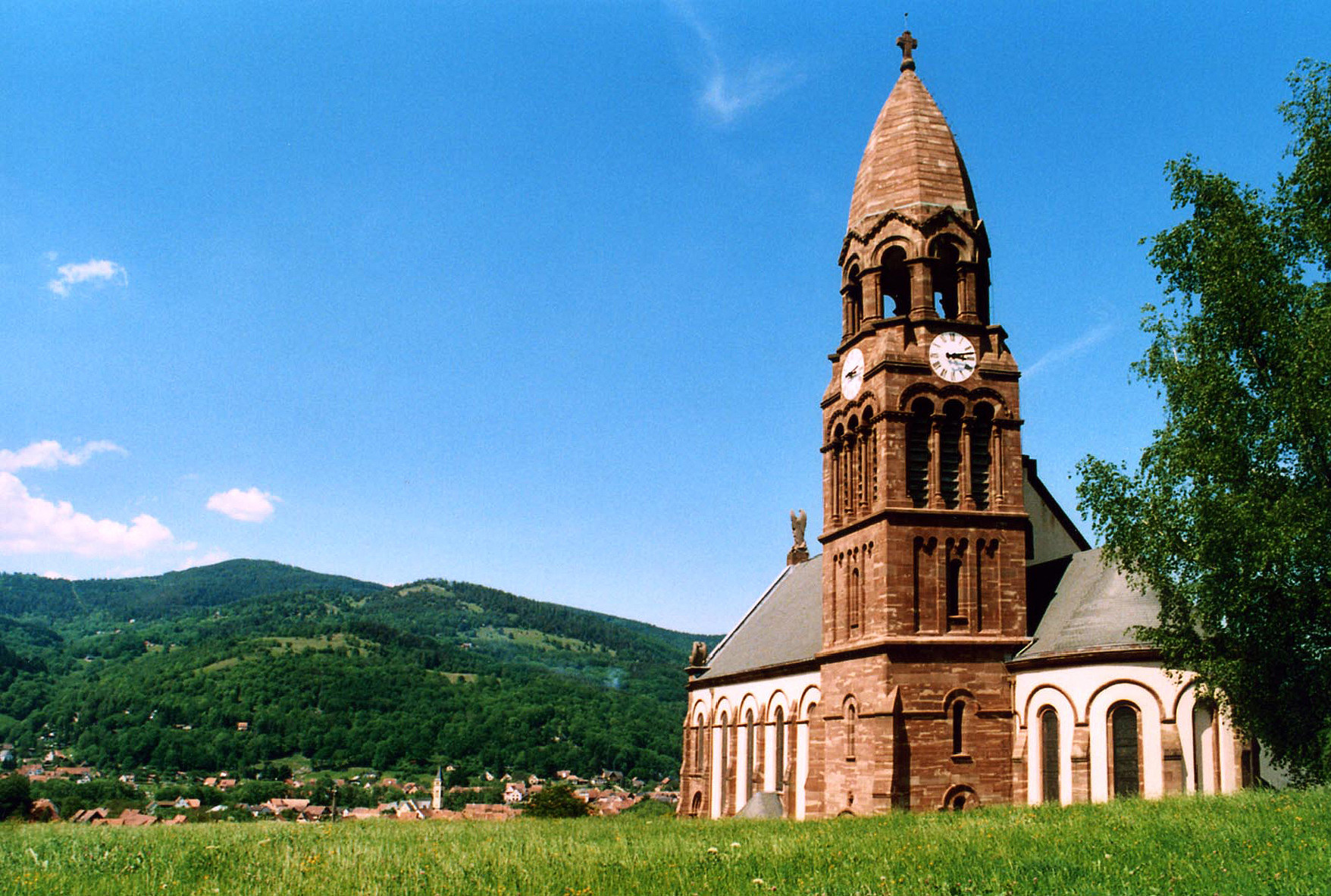
- The church of L'Emm

- Coat of arms
- Location of Sondernach
- Location within France Location within Grand Est
- Coordinates: 47°59′52″N 7°04′29″E
- Country: France
- Region: Grand Est
- Department: Haut-Rhin
- Arrondissement: Colmar-Ribeauvillé
- Canton: Wintzenheim
- Intercommunality: Vallée de Munster

Government
  - Mayor (2020–2026): Thierry Bessey
- Area^{1}: 8.44 km^{2} (3.26 sq mi)
- Elevation: 540 m (1,770 ft)
- Highest elevation: 1,324 m (4,344 ft)
- Lowest elevation: 497 m (1,631 ft)
- Population (2023): 590
  - Density: 70/km^{2} (180/sq mi)
- Time zone: UTC+01:00 (CET)
  - Summer (DST): UTC+02:00 (CEST)
- INSEE/Postal code: 68311 /68380
- ^{1} French Land Register data, which excludes lakes, ponds, glaciers > 1 km^{2} (0.386 sq mi or 247 acres) and river estuaries.

Sondernach is a commune in the Haut-Rhin département in Grand Est in north-eastern France.

== Geography ==
Located in the parc naturel régional des Ballons des Vosges, the village of Sondernach shares with Mittlach the benefit of being situated on the slopes of a large valley watered by one of the streams forming the river Fecht. The altitude of the centre is between 500 and 600 metres.

Its only immediate neighbour is the commune of Metzeral to the north.

=== Origin of name ===
The origin of the village's name is unclear. It could be from der Sonne nahe meaning "near the Sun", or zum sundern Ach meaning "near the south stream", Sondernach being the furthest south village in the valley.

== History ==
Sondernach first appears in archives in the 12th century. Around 1240, the Benedictine Abbey of Munster owned lands in the village. From 1287, the village was made part of the valley community grouping Munster and the ten communes of the Fecht. It was destroyed during the First World War, during the battle of Metzeral, in June 1915.

== See also ==
- Communes of the Haut-Rhin department
