= John Griesbach =

English musician and composer

John Henry Griesbach (20 June 1798 – 9 January 1875) was an English composer, pianist, cellist and teacher.

== Life ==
Griesbach was born in Windsor, Berkshire, on 20 June 1798, the eldest son of Justin Christian Griesbach, cellist in Queen Charlotte's band, and nephew of Friedrich Griesbach, the oboe player. He studied music under his uncle, George Leopold Jacob Griesbach, and at 12 years of age was appointed cellist in the Queen's band. He then studied for some years under Friedrich Kalkbrenner.

On the breaking up of the Queen's band at her death he came to London, and appeared at concerts as a pianist. In 1822 he composed a symphony, and a capriccio for piano and orchestra, and shortly afterwards a second symphony (op. 23, 1833) for the Philharmonic Society. Although he was after this time principally engaged in tuition, he found time to produce numerous compositions of various kinds. He was also interested in astronomy, painting in water colours, entomology and mathematics.

He was fourteen times a director of the Philharmonic Society. He died on 9 January 1875.

== Works ==
Belshazzar's Feast, an oratorio, was written in 1835 with a view to stage representation; unable to get it staged, he remodelled the work some years later, and it was performed, under the title of Daniel, by the Sacred Harmonic Society on 30 June 1854.

Other compositions by Griesbach include an Overture and Music to Shakespeare's The Tempest; James the First, or, The Royal Captive, an operetta; The Goldsmith of West Cheap, an opera; Eblis, an opera (unfinished); Raby Ruins, a musical drama; several overtures and other instrumental pieces, anthems, songs and cantatas.

He also wrote An Analysis of Musical Sounds (published), and The fundamental elements of Counterpoint, The Acoustic Laws of Harmony, and Tables shewing the variations of musical pitch from the time of Handel to 1859 (unpublished).
