= Breitenbach-Haut-Rhin =

Commune in Grand Est, France

- Commune
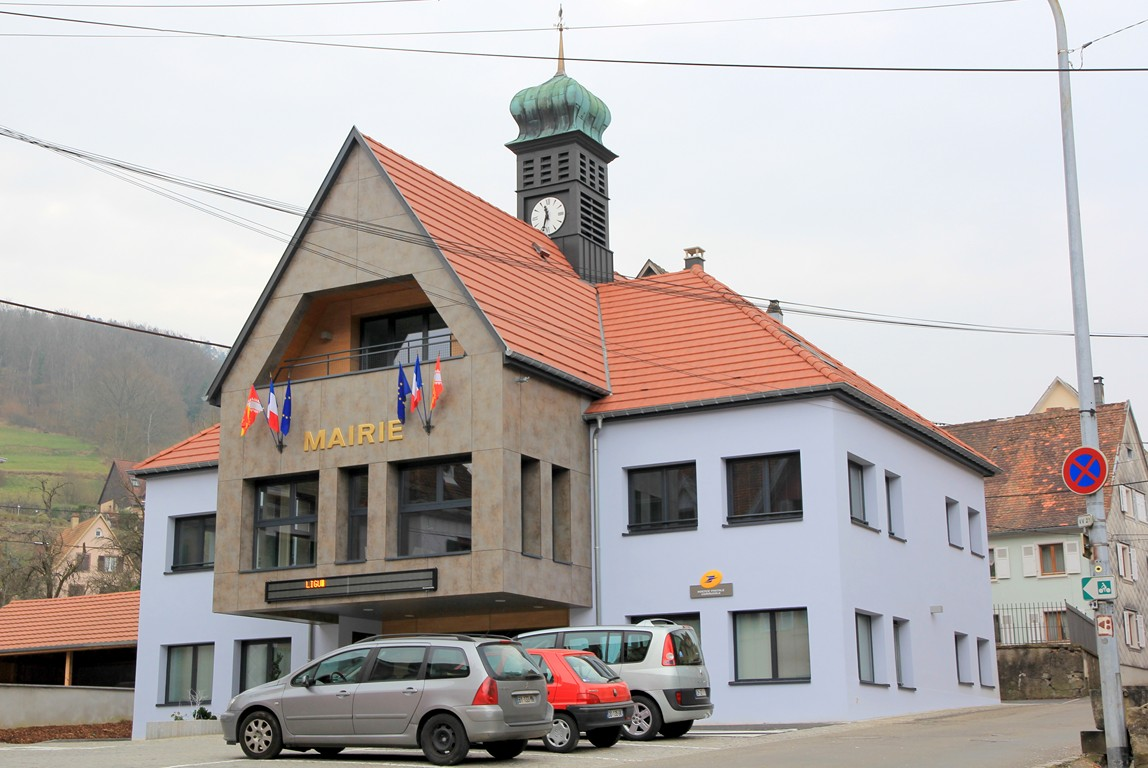
- New town hall of Breitenbach

- Coat of arms
- Location of Breitenbach-Haut-Rhin
- Location within France Location within Grand Est
- Coordinates: 48°01′27″N 7°06′05″E
- Country: France
- Region: Grand Est
- Department: Haut-Rhin
- Arrondissement: Colmar-Ribeauvillé
- Canton: Wintzenheim
- Intercommunality: Vallée de Munster

Government
  - Mayor (2020–2026): Monique Hans
- Area^{1}: 9.37 km^{2} (3.62 sq mi)
- Elevation: 440 m (1,440 ft)
- Highest elevation: 1,165 m (3,822 ft)
- Lowest elevation: 414 m (1,358 ft)
- Population (2023): 819
  - Density: 87.4/km^{2} (226/sq mi)
- Time zone: UTC+01:00 (CET)
  - Summer (DST): UTC+02:00 (CEST)
- INSEE/Postal code: 68051 /68380
- ^{1} French Land Register data, which excludes lakes, ponds, glaciers > 1 km^{2} (0.386 sq mi or 247 acres) and river estuaries.

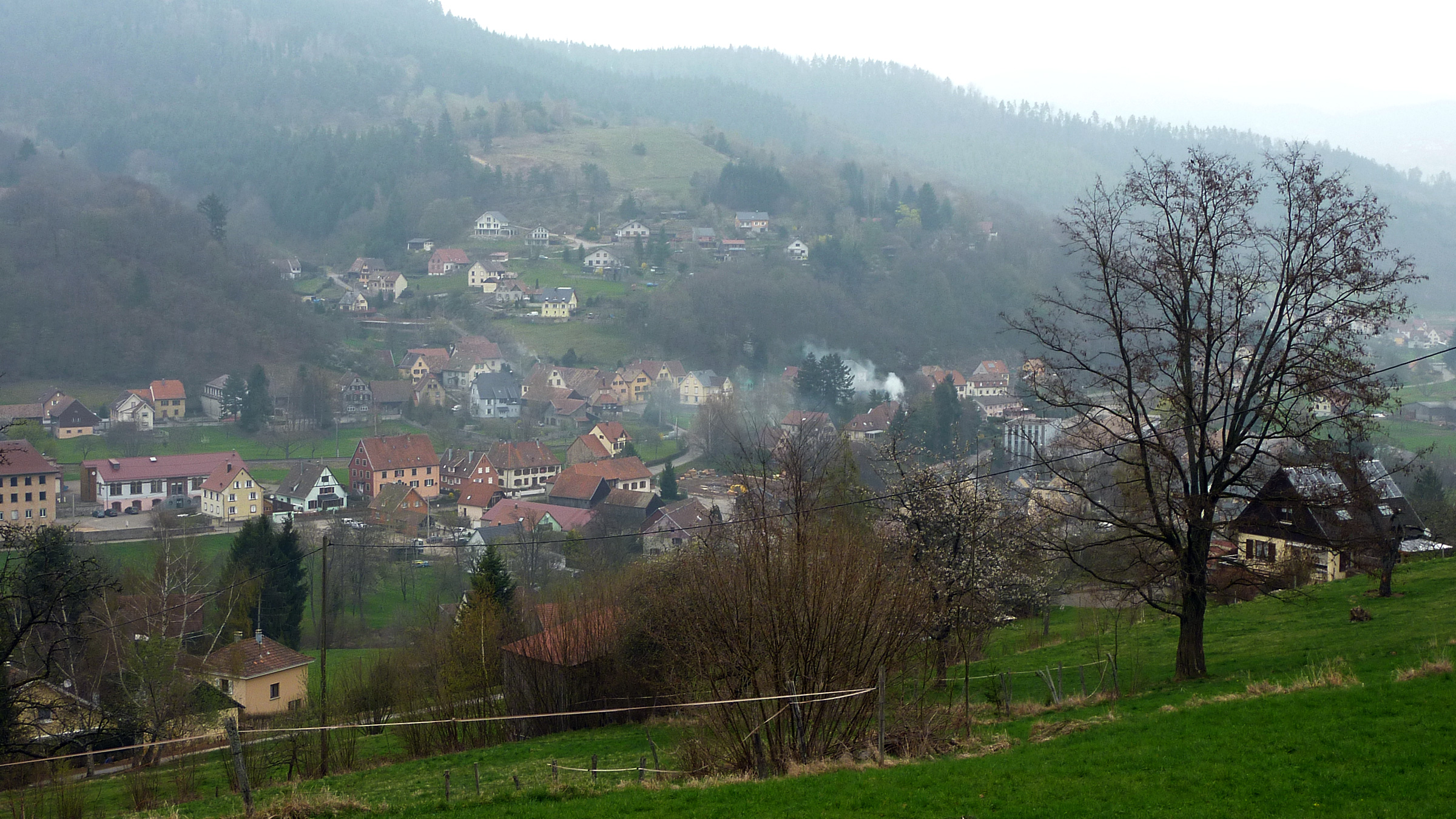
Breitenbach

Breitenbach-Haut-Rhin (German: Breitenbach; Alsatian: Bräitebàch or Bräiteba) is a commune in the Haut-Rhin department in Grand Est in north-eastern France.

Its inhabitants are Breitenbachois. Its official name distinguishes it from Breitenbach, Bas-Rhin.

The place name appears in thirteenth-century documents, and is composed of the words breit ("wide") and bach ("stream"). The valley in which it lies was a possession of the Abbey of Munster until the French Revolution.

== See also ==
- Communes of the Haut-Rhin department
