= Eschbach-au-Val =

Commune in Grand Est, France

- Commune
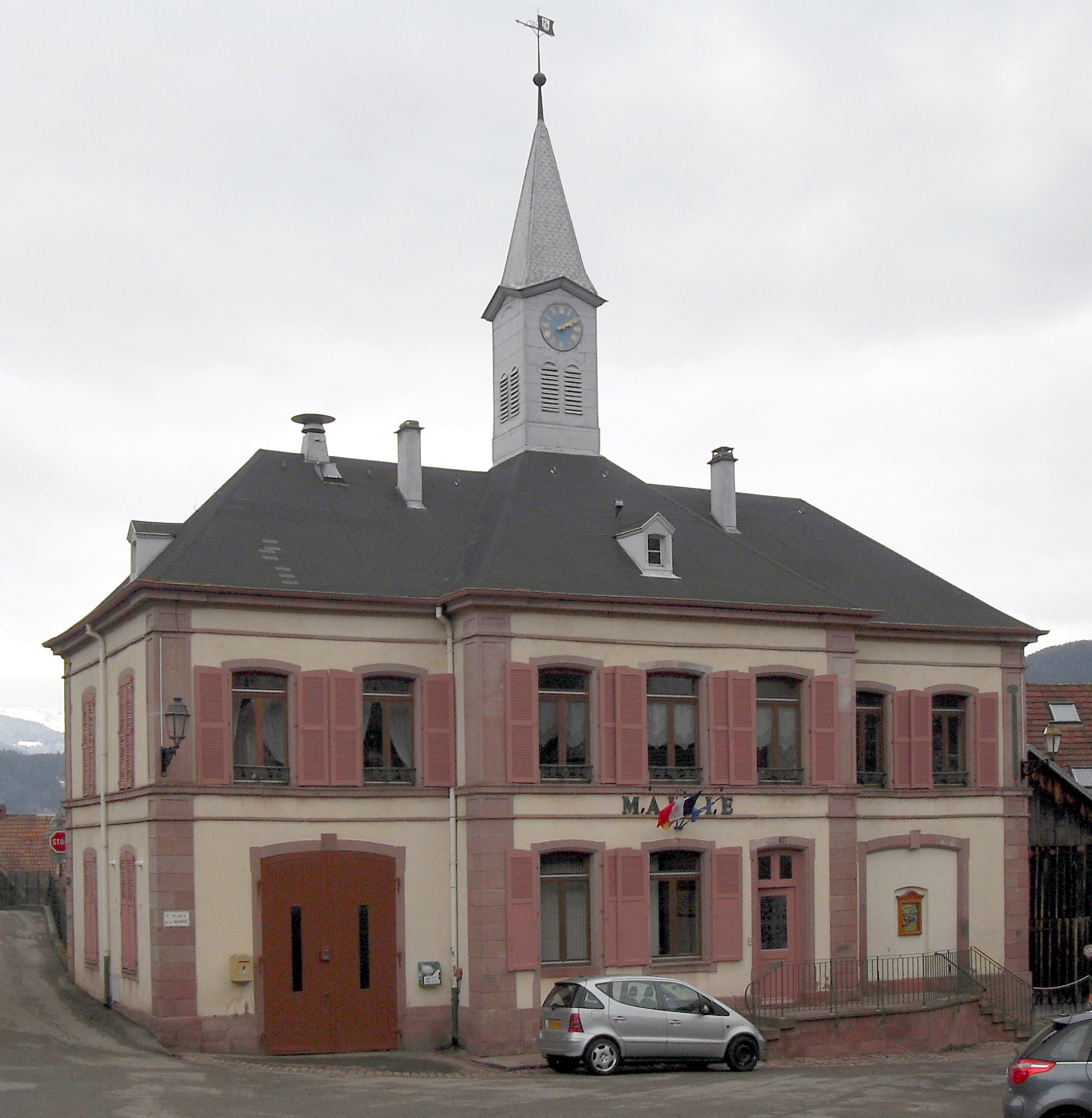
- The town hall in Eschbach-au-Val

- Coat of arms
- Location of Eschbach-au-Val
- Location within France Location within Grand Est
- Coordinates: 48°01′55″N 7°08′45″E
- Country: France
- Region: Grand Est
- Department: Haut-Rhin
- Arrondissement: Colmar-Ribeauvillé
- Canton: Wintzenheim
- Intercommunality: Vallée de Munster

Government
  - Mayor (2020–2026): Norbert Schickel
- Area^{1}: 4.84 km^{2} (1.87 sq mi)
- Elevation: 481 m (1,578 ft)
- Highest elevation: 905 m (2,969 ft)
- Lowest elevation: 389 m (1,276 ft)
- Population (2023): 378
  - Density: 78.1/km^{2} (202/sq mi)
- Time zone: UTC+01:00 (CET)
  - Summer (DST): UTC+02:00 (CEST)
- INSEE/Postal code: 68083 /68140
- ^{1} French Land Register data, which excludes lakes, ponds, glaciers > 1 km^{2} (0.386 sq mi or 247 acres) and river estuaries.

Eschbach-au-Val (German: Eschbach im Tal) is a commune in the Haut-Rhin department in Grand Est in north-eastern France.

== See also ==
- Communes of the Haut-Rhin département
