= Obermorschwihr =

Commune in Grand Est, France

- Commune
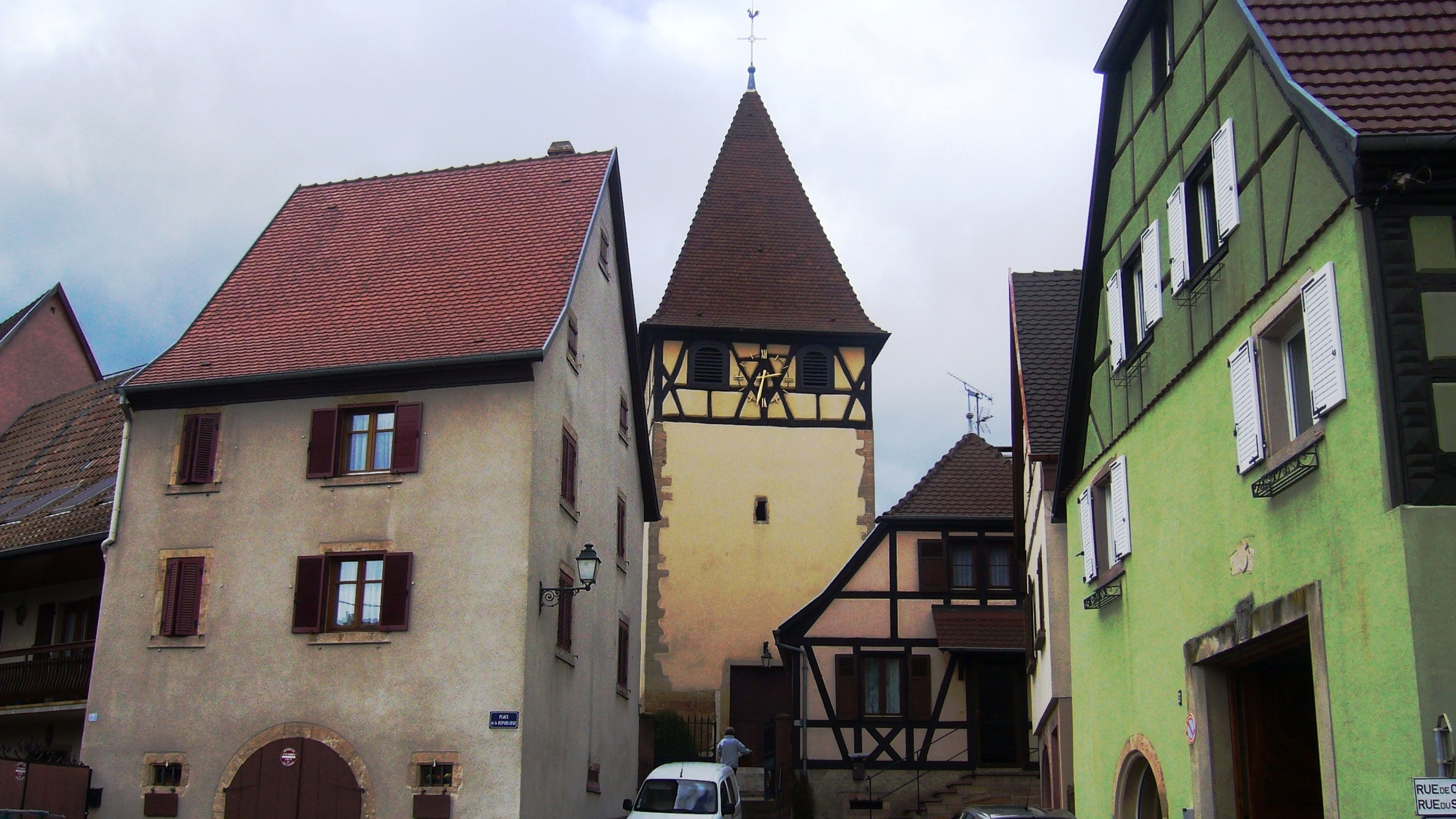
- The bell tower in Obermorschwihr

- Coat of arms
- Location of Obermorschwihr
- Location within France Location within Grand Est
- Coordinates: 48°01′10″N 7°17′54″E
- Country: France
- Region: Grand Est
- Department: Haut-Rhin
- Arrondissement: Colmar-Ribeauvillé
- Canton: Wintzenheim
- Intercommunality: Pays de Rouffach, Vignobles et Châteaux

Government
  - Mayor (2020–2026): Bertrand Heyberger
- Area^{1}: 1.59 km^{2} (0.61 sq mi)
- Elevation: 260 m (850 ft)
- Highest elevation: 350 m (1,150 ft)
- Lowest elevation: 220 m (720 ft)
- Population (2023): 420
  - Density: 260/km^{2} (680/sq mi)
- Time zone: UTC+01:00 (CET)
  - Summer (DST): UTC+02:00 (CEST)
- INSEE/Postal code: 68244 /68420
- ^{1} French Land Register data, which excludes lakes, ponds, glaciers > 1 km^{2} (0.386 sq mi or 247 acres) and river estuaries.

Obermorschwihr (German: Obermorschweier) is a commune in the Haut-Rhin department in Grand Est in north-eastern France.

== Population ==
Historical population
Year	Pop.	±% p.a.
1968	330	—
1975	376	+1.88%
1982	371	−0.19%
1990	354	−0.58%
1999	358	+0.12%
2007	379	+0.72%
2012	364	−0.80%
2017	359	−0.28%
2023	420	+2.65%
Source: INSEE

== See also ==
- Communes of the Haut-Rhin department
