= Luttenbach-près-Munster =

Commune in Grand Est, France

- Commune
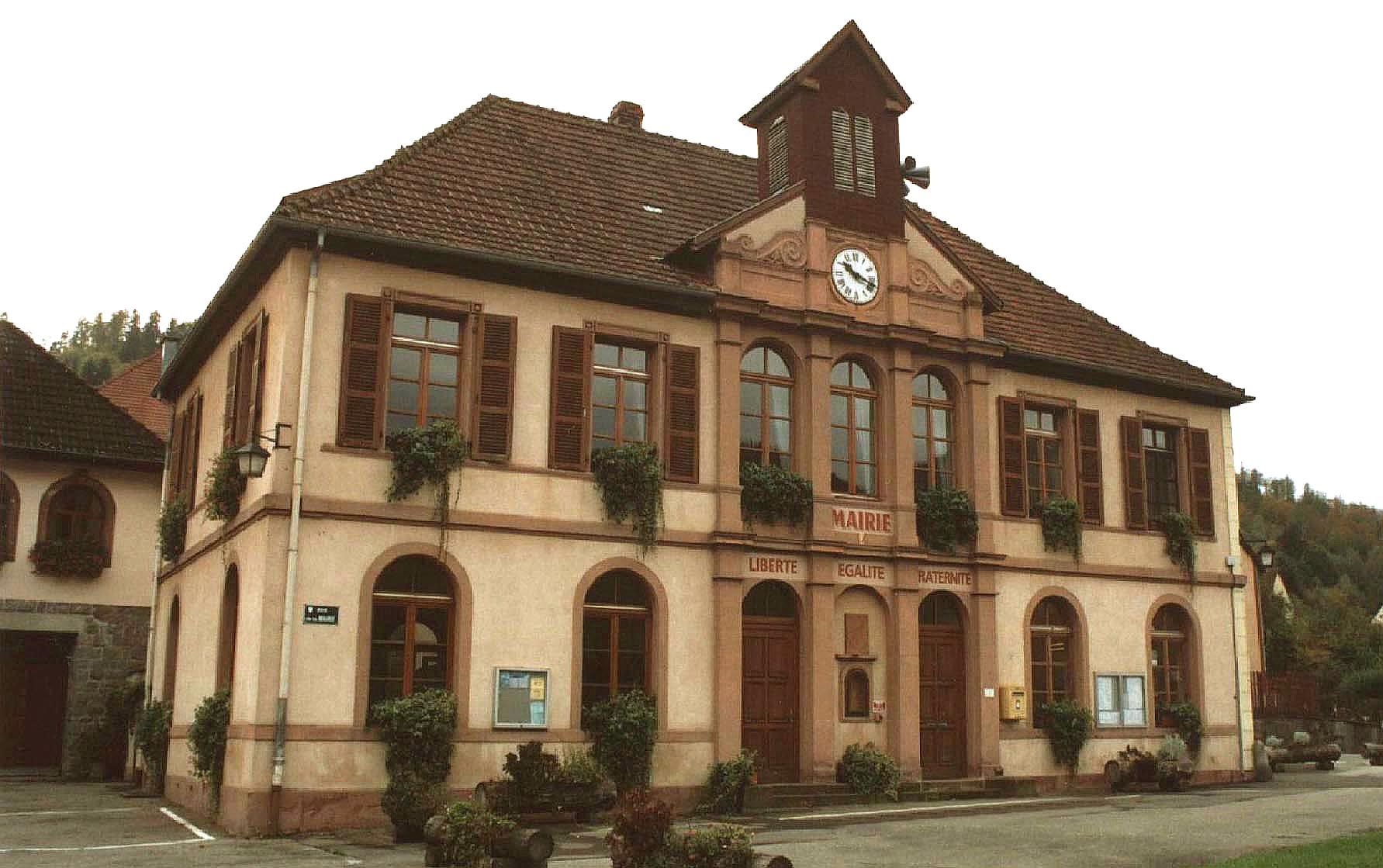
- The town hall in Luttenbach

- Coat of arms
- Location of Luttenbach-près-Munster
- Location within France Location within Grand Est
- Coordinates: 48°01′59″N 7°07′11″E
- Country: France
- Region: Grand Est
- Department: Haut-Rhin
- Arrondissement: Colmar-Ribeauvillé
- Canton: Wintzenheim
- Intercommunality: Vallée de Munster

Government
  - Mayor (2020–2026): Bernard Reinheimer
- Area^{1}: 7.86 km^{2} (3.03 sq mi)
- Elevation: 420 m (1,380 ft)
- Highest elevation: 1,265 m (4,150 ft)
- Lowest elevation: 388 m (1,273 ft)
- Population (2023): 756
  - Density: 96.2/km^{2} (249/sq mi)
- Time zone: UTC+01:00 (CET)
  - Summer (DST): UTC+02:00 (CEST)
- INSEE/Postal code: 68193 /68140
- ^{1} French Land Register data, which excludes lakes, ponds, glaciers > 1 km^{2} (0.386 sq mi or 247 acres) and river estuaries.

Luttenbach-près-Munster (German: Luttenbach bei Münster) is a commune in the Haut-Rhin department in Grand Est in north-eastern France.

== See also ==
- Communes of the Haut-Rhin département
