= Soultzbach-les-Bains =

Commune in Grand Est, France

- Commune
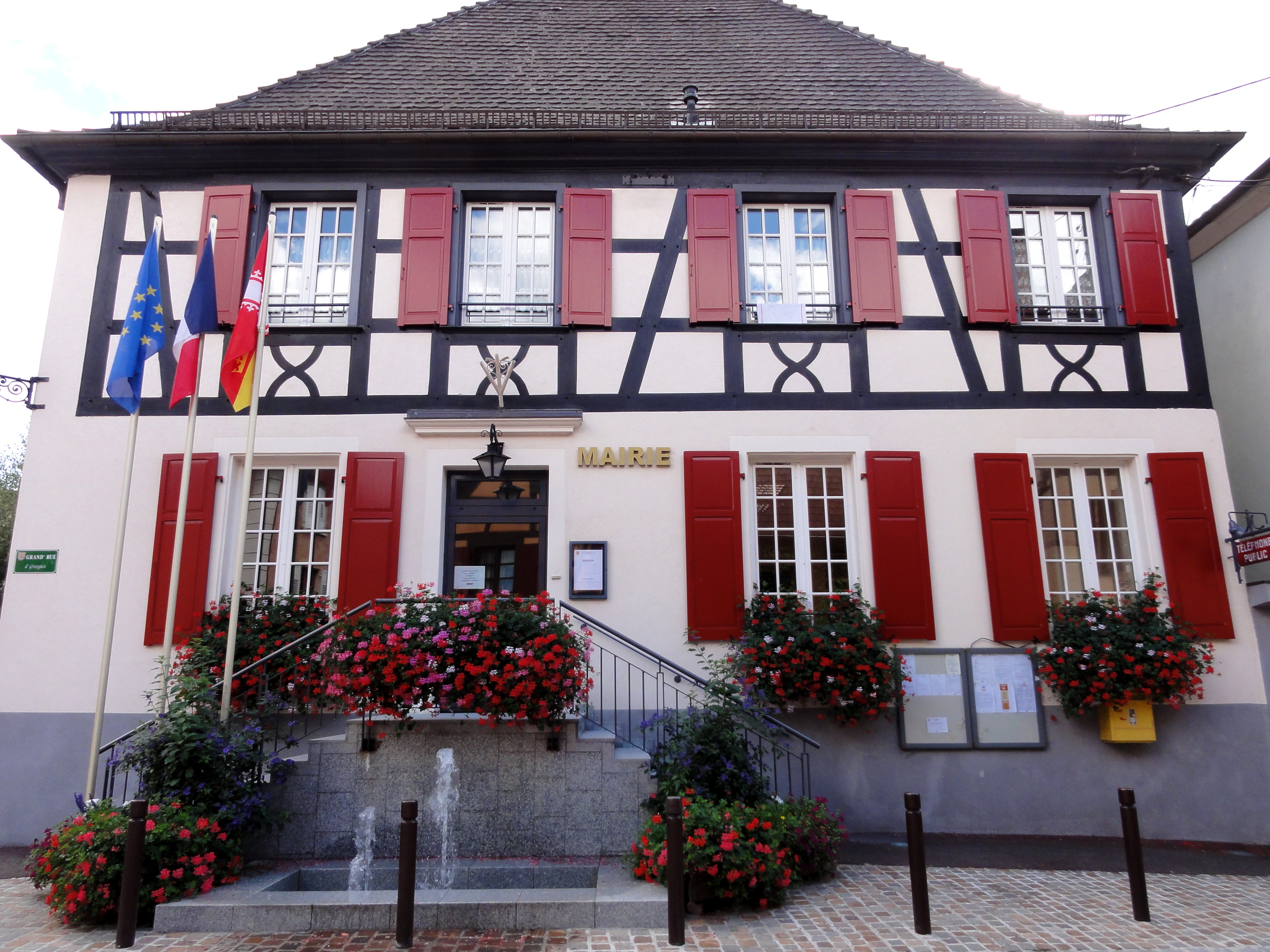
- The town hall in Soultzbach-les-Bains

- Coat of arms
- Location of Soultzbach-les-Bains
- Location within France Location within Grand Est
- Coordinates: 48°02′18″N 7°12′17″E
- Country: France
- Region: Grand Est
- Department: Haut-Rhin
- Arrondissement: Colmar-Ribeauvillé
- Canton: Wintzenheim
- Intercommunality: Vallée de Munster

Government
  - Mayor (2020–2026): Jean Ellminger
- Area^{1}: 7.06 km^{2} (2.73 sq mi)
- Elevation: 340 m (1,120 ft)
- Highest elevation: 899 m (2,949 ft)
- Lowest elevation: 306 m (1,004 ft)
- Population (2023): 731
  - Density: 104/km^{2} (268/sq mi)
- Time zone: UTC+01:00 (CET)
  - Summer (DST): UTC+02:00 (CEST)
- INSEE/Postal code: 68316 /68230
- ^{1} French Land Register data, which excludes lakes, ponds, glaciers > 1 km^{2} (0.386 sq mi or 247 acres) and river estuaries.

Soultzbach-les-Bains (German: Bad Sulzbach) is a commune in the Haut-Rhin department in Grand Est in north-eastern France.

== See also ==
- Communes of the Haut-Rhin department
