= Mittlach =

Commune in Grand Est, France

- Commune
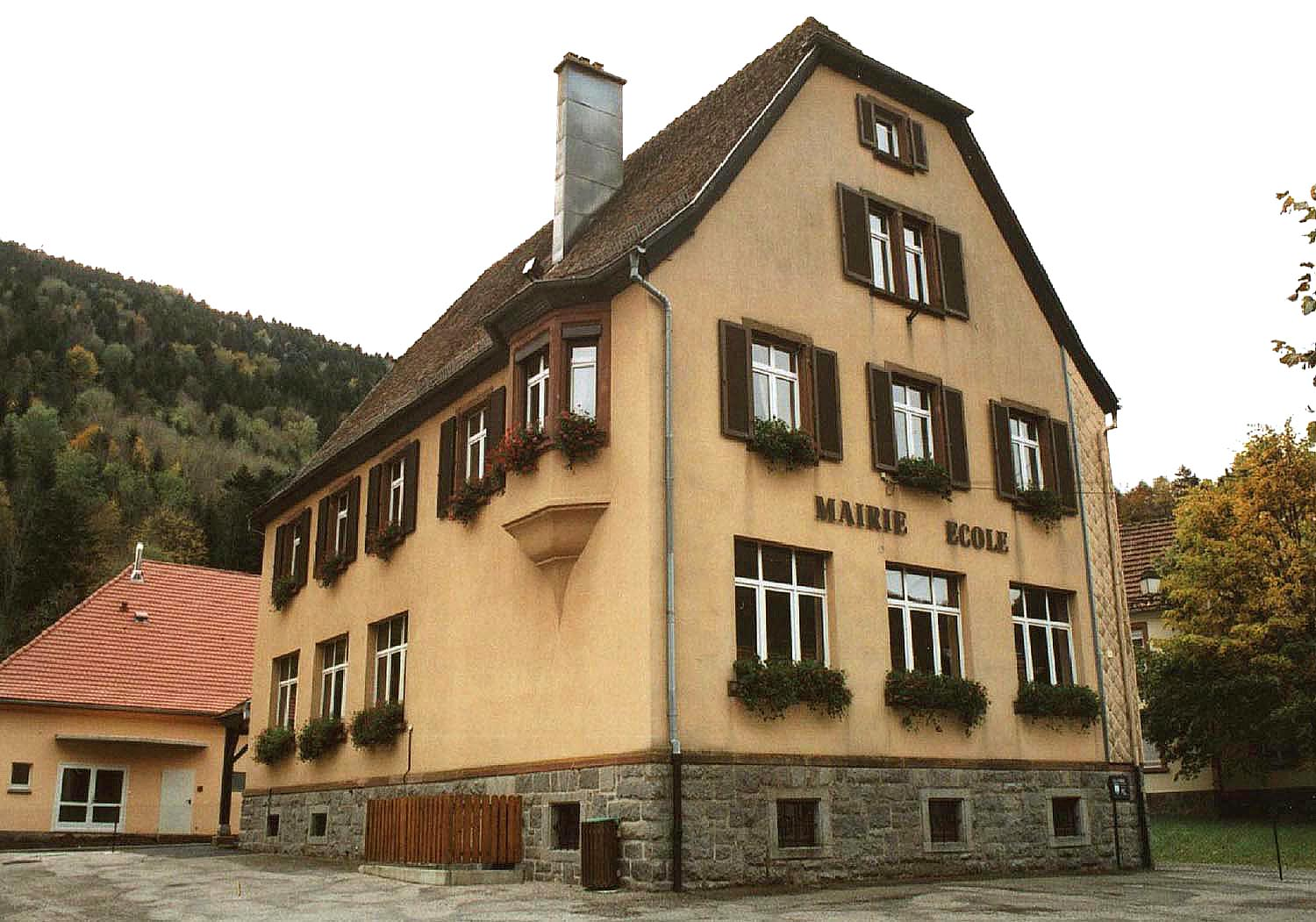
- The town hall of Mittlach

- Coat of arms
- Location of Mittlach
- Location within France Location within Grand Est
- Coordinates: 48°00′18″N 7°01′53″E
- Country: France
- Region: Grand Est
- Department: Haut-Rhin
- Arrondissement: Colmar-Ribeauvillé
- Canton: Wintzenheim
- Intercommunality: Vallée de Munster

Government
  - Mayor (2020–2026): Bernard Zinglé
- Area^{1}: 11.39 km^{2} (4.40 sq mi)
- Elevation: 530 m (1,740 ft)
- Highest elevation: 1,320 m (4,330 ft)
- Lowest elevation: 515 m (1,690 ft)
- Population (2023): 339
  - Density: 29.8/km^{2} (77.1/sq mi)
- Time zone: UTC+01:00 (CET)
  - Summer (DST): UTC+02:00 (CEST)
- INSEE/Postal code: 68210 /68380
- ^{1} French Land Register data, which excludes lakes, ponds, glaciers > 1 km^{2} (0.386 sq mi or 247 acres) and river estuaries.

Mittlach is a commune in the Haut-Rhin department in Grand Est in north-eastern France.

== See also ==
- Communes of the Haut-Rhin département
