= Wihr-au-Val =

Commune in Grand Est, France

- Commune
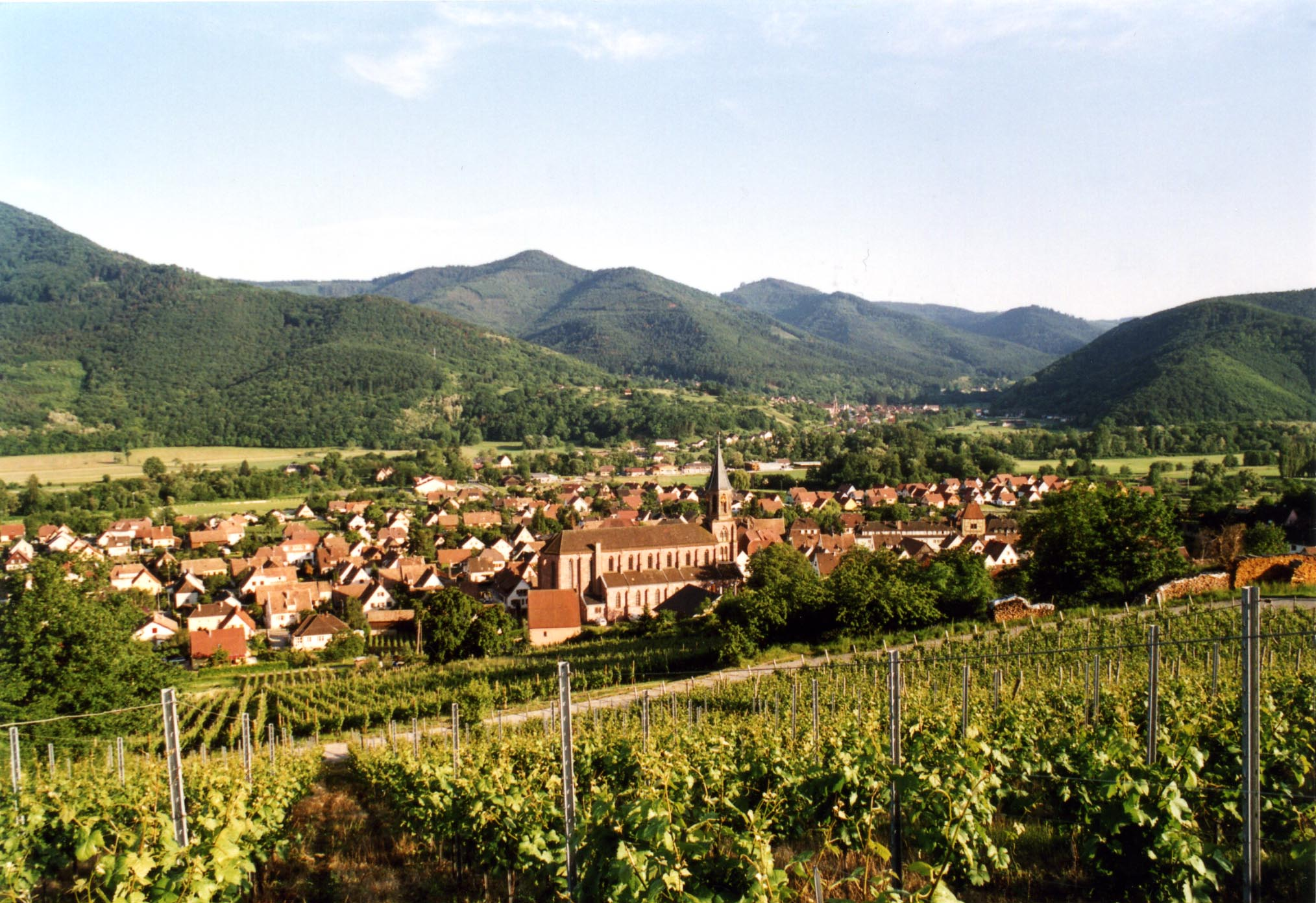
- Wihr-au-Val seen from the vineyards

- Coat of arms
- Location of Wihr-au-Val
- Location within France Location within Grand Est
- Coordinates: 48°03′15″N 7°12′23″E
- Country: France
- Region: Grand Est
- Department: Haut-Rhin
- Arrondissement: Colmar-Ribeauvillé
- Canton: Wintzenheim
- Intercommunality: Vallée de Munster

Government
  - Mayor (2020–2026): Gabriel Burgard
- Area^{1}: 12.54 km^{2} (4.84 sq mi)
- Elevation: 320 m (1,050 ft)
- Highest elevation: 960 m (3,150 ft)
- Lowest elevation: 288 m (945 ft)
- Population (2023): 1,195
  - Density: 95.30/km^{2} (246.8/sq mi)
- Time zone: UTC+01:00 (CET)
  - Summer (DST): UTC+02:00 (CEST)
- INSEE/Postal code: 68368 /68230
- ^{1} French Land Register data, which excludes lakes, ponds, glaciers > 1 km^{2} (0.386 sq mi or 247 acres) and river estuaries.

Wihr-au-Val (French pronunciation: [viʁ o val]; German: Weier im Thal; Alsatian: Wihr ìm Dàl) is a commune in the Haut-Rhin department in Grand Est in north-eastern France.

== Population ==
Historical population
Year	Pop.	±% p.a.
1968	1,029	—
1975	1,106	+1.04%
1982	1,051	−0.73%
1990	1,089	+0.44%
1999	1,232	+1.38%
2007	1,186	−0.47%
2012	1,271	+1.39%
2017	1,263	−0.13%
2023	1,195	−0.92%
Source: INSEE

== See also ==
- Communes of the Haut-Rhin department
