= Metzeral =

Commune in Grand Est, France

- Commune
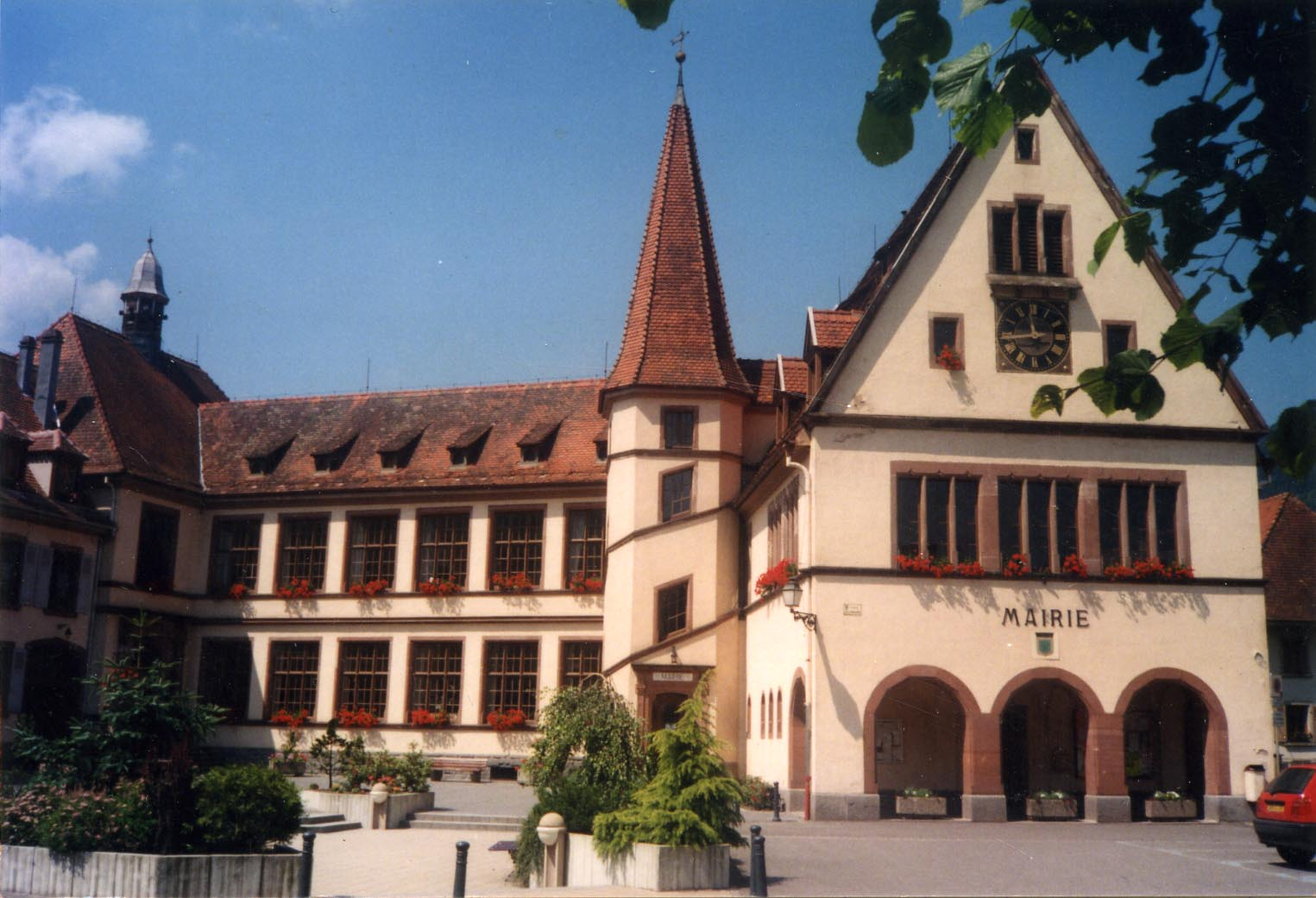
- The town hall in Metzeral

- Coat of arms
- Location of Metzeral
- Location within France Location within Grand Est
- Coordinates: 48°00′47″N 7°04′16″E
- Country: France
- Region: Grand Est
- Department: Haut-Rhin
- Arrondissement: Colmar-Ribeauvillé
- Canton: Wintzenheim
- Intercommunality: Vallée de Munster

Government
  - Mayor (2020–2026): Denise Buhl
- Area^{1}: 30.43 km^{2} (11.75 sq mi)
- Elevation: 484 m (1,588 ft)
- Highest elevation: 1,364 m (4,475 ft)
- Lowest elevation: 456 m (1,496 ft)
- Population (2023): 1,058
  - Density: 34.77/km^{2} (90.05/sq mi)
- Time zone: UTC+01:00 (CET)
  - Summer (DST): UTC+02:00 (CEST)
- INSEE/Postal code: 68204 /68380
- ^{1} French Land Register data, which excludes lakes, ponds, glaciers > 1 km^{2} (0.386 sq mi or 247 acres) and river estuaries.

Metzeral (French pronunciation: [mɛtsəʁal]) is a commune in the Haut-Rhin department in Grand Est in north-eastern France. The commune is located in the historical and cultural region of Alsace.

== History ==
Founded in 817 it is the oldest village in the greater valley of Munster. Metzeral, along with the rest of Alsace remained under Frankish control until the Frankish realm, following the Oaths of Strasbourg of 842, was formally dissolved in 843 at the Treaty of Verdun; the grandsons of Charlemagne divided the realm into three parts. Alsace formed part of the Middle Francia, which was ruled by the eldest grandson Lothar I.

The village was formerly a possession of the Benedictine Abbey of Munster, Metzeral entered the community of Val and the city of Munster in 1287 . The locality became one of the six large villages in the municipality of the city and the valley of Munster, with a provost (Schultheiss), member of the municipal council. It was designated “Dorfmeyster zu Meczeral” in 1536. The valley suffered poorly during the Thirty Years' War (1618 - 1648), with southern Alsace annexed by France in 1648, with most of the remainder conquered later in the century. In contrast to other parts of France, Protestants were permitted to practise their faith in Alsace even after the Edict of Fontainebleau of 1685 that abolished their privileges in the rest of France. The first school in the village was founded in 1737.

The French Revolution gave autonomy to each commune in the valley, which had the right to its mayor and municipal council. Metzeral only obtained its independence in 1801. The land register was established in 1813. Forests are common property; in 1833 their division began, which took place in 1847. The village developed in the 19th century thanks in part to the textile industry. At its peak, in 1861, Metzeral had 1,801 inhabitants.

After Franco-Prussian War (1870 - 1871), Alsace became an administrative possession or 'Imperial territory' of Germany, following the founding of the German empire. In 1893, on the initiative of the Hartmann industrialists from Munster, the railway line, opened between Colmar and Munster in 1868, connecting Metzeral with the other settlements outside the vallay. Originally included in the Metzeral ban, Mittlach (founded in 1741 by Tyrolean lumberjacks) was established as a commune on 1 April 1908.

During the First World War, Metzeral was the subject of a battle between the 15–21 June 1915, part of the larger Second Battle of Artois which resulted in a decisive French victory and the city being taken by the French army on 22 June. The town, for its part, was left in ruins. These events were immortalized by the official army painter: François Flameng, whose sketches and drawings appeared in the magazine L'Illustration. following the war, the Alsace was incorporated into the Third French Republic. Most of the village was rebuilt following the armistice under the authority of mayor Jacques Immer.

During the Second World War, a fortunate combination of circumstances spared the town from destruction. Indeed, while a German offensive was being prepared (January 1945), for three weeks, such an abundance of snow began fall that any military operation became impossible. Prevented by snow, the Wehrmacht had to leave the valley without firing a shot. Metzeral was liberated on 5 February 1945.

== Transport ==
=== Road ===
Nearby motorway: A35, also called the stork motorway or the Alsatian motorway: Colmar south interchanges, Sainte-Croix-en-Plaine, Niederentzen.

=== Rail ===
Rail transport in Metzeral is supplied by SNCF via TGV, intercity and TER services from Metzeral station. Fluo Grand Est, established in 2019, bringing the former interurban road transport networks of the ten departments of the region, as well as the TER network, under the same identity.

=== Air ===
Colmar – Houssen Airport is the nearest airport to the settlement.

== See also ==
- Communes of the Haut-Rhin département
