= Arrondissement of Ribeauvillé =

Coordinates: 48°12′N 7°20′E

Ribeauvillé
- Former arrondissement
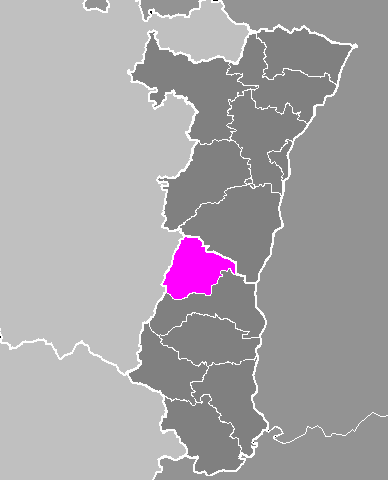
- Location within the former region Alsace
- Country: France
- Region: Grand Est
- Department: Haut-Rhin
- No. of communes: {{{nbcomm}}}
- Disbanded: 2015
- Area: 462 km^{2} (178 sq mi)
- Population (2012): 50,005
  - Density: 108/km^{2} (280/sq mi)

The arrondissement of Ribeauvillé is a former arrondissement of France in the Haut-Rhin department in the Alsace region. In 2015 it was merged into the new arrondissement of Colmar-Ribeauvillé. It had 32 communes, and its population was 50,005 (2012).

== Composition ==
The communes of the arrondissement of Ribeauvillé, and their INSEE codes, were:

1. Ammerschwihr (68005)	2. Aubure (68014)	3. Beblenheim (68023)	4. Bennwihr (68026)
5. Bergheim (68028)	6. Fréland (68097)	7. Guémar (68113)	8. Hunawihr (68147)
9. Illhaeusern (68153)	10. Ingersheim (68155)	11. Katzenthal (68161)	12. Kaysersberg (68162)
13. Kientzheim (68164)	14. Labaroche (68173)	15. Lapoutroie (68175)	16. Le Bonhomme (68044)
17. Lièpvre (68185)	18. Mittelwihr (68209)	19. Niedermorschwihr (68237)	20. Orbey (68249)
21. Ostheim (68252)	22. Ribeauvillé (68269)	23. Riquewihr (68277)	24. Rodern (68280)
25. Rombach-le-Franc (68283)	26. Rorschwihr (68285)	27. Saint-Hippolyte (68296)	28. Sainte-Croix-aux-Mines (68294)
29. Sainte-Marie-aux-Mines (68298)	30. Sigolsheim (68310)	31. Thannenkirch (68335)	32. Zellenberg (68383)

== History ==
The arrondissement of Ribeauvillé was created in 1919. It was disbanded in 2015. As a result of the reorganisation of the cantons of France which came into effect in 2015, the borders of the cantons are no longer related to the borders of the arrondissements. The cantons of the arrondissement of Ribeauvillé were, as of January 2015:

1. Kaysersberg
2. Lapoutroie
3. Ribeauvillé
4. Sainte-Marie-aux-Mines
