= Saint-Hippolyte, Haut-Rhin =

Commune in Grand Est, France

Saint-Hippolyte
- Commune
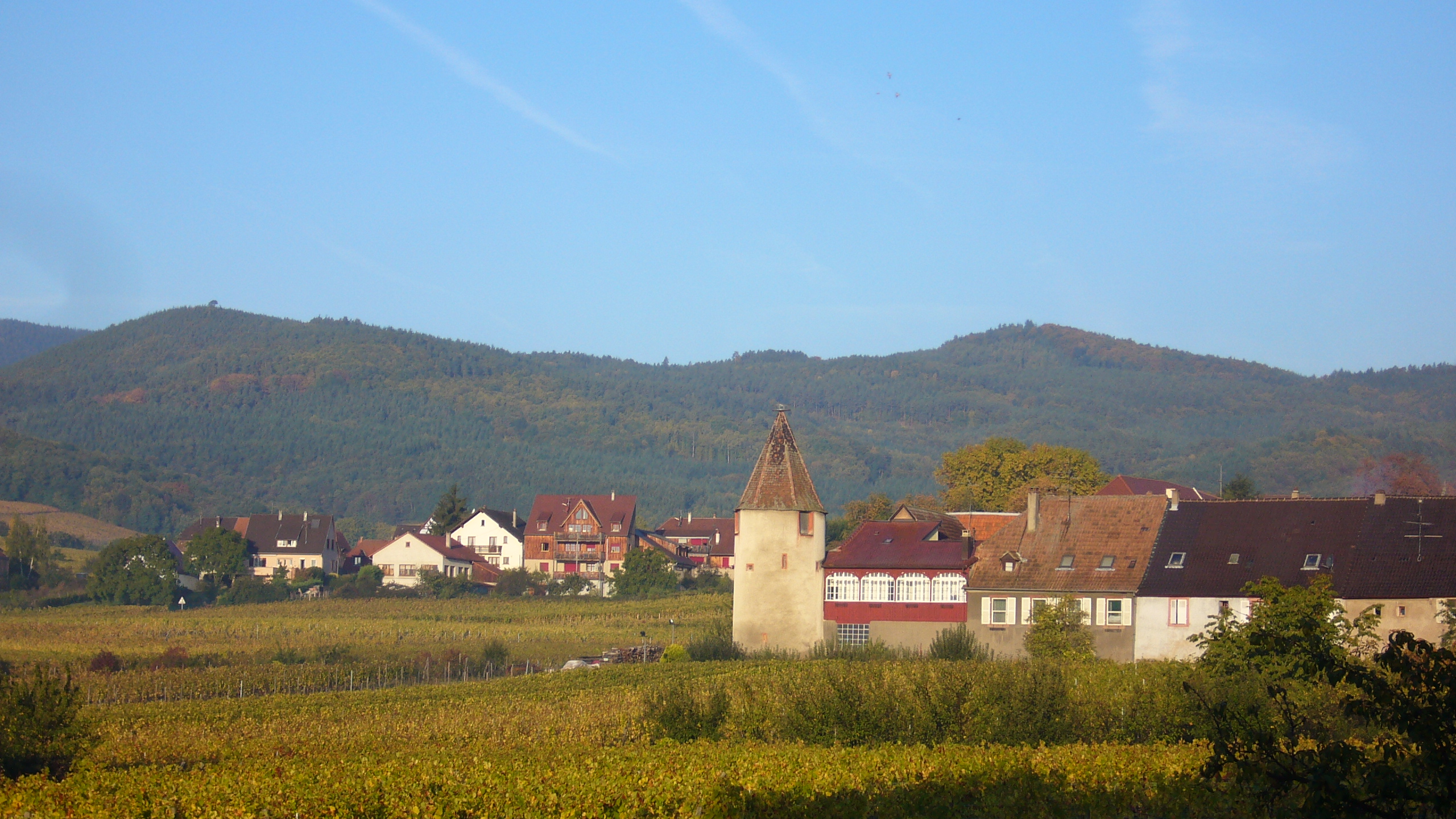
- Saint-Hippolyte, with the round Stork Tower

- Coat of arms
- Location of Saint-Hippolyte
- Location within France Location within Grand Est
- Coordinates: 48°13′57″N 7°22′21″E
- Country: France
- Region: Grand Est
- Department: Haut-Rhin
- Arrondissement: Colmar-Ribeauvillé
- Canton: Sainte-Marie-aux-Mines
- Intercommunality: Pays de Ribeauvillé

Government
  - Mayor (2020–2026): Claude Huber
- Area^{1}: 17.86 km^{2} (6.90 sq mi)
- Highest elevation: 731 m (2,398 ft)
- Lowest elevation: 170 m (560 ft)
- Population (2023): 927
  - Density: 51.9/km^{2} (134/sq mi)
- Time zone: UTC+01:00 (CET)
  - Summer (DST): UTC+02:00 (CEST)
- INSEE/Postal code: 68296 /68590
- ^{1} French Land Register data, which excludes lakes, ponds, glaciers > 1 km^{2} (0.386 sq mi or 247 acres) and river estuaries.

Saint-Hippolyte (French pronunciation: [sɛ̃.t‿ipɔlit]; German: Sankt Pilt; Alsatian: Sàmpìlt) is a commune in the Haut-Rhin department in Grand Est in north-eastern France.

It is often said to be the birthplace of the 8th-century saint and abbot Fulrad, who built a monastery there. Saint-Hippolyte is situated very close to the highly strategic castle of Haut-Koenigsbourg, and for many centuries the conflict centred on possession of the castle had a great influence, mostly destructive, on the history of the town.

== Geography ==
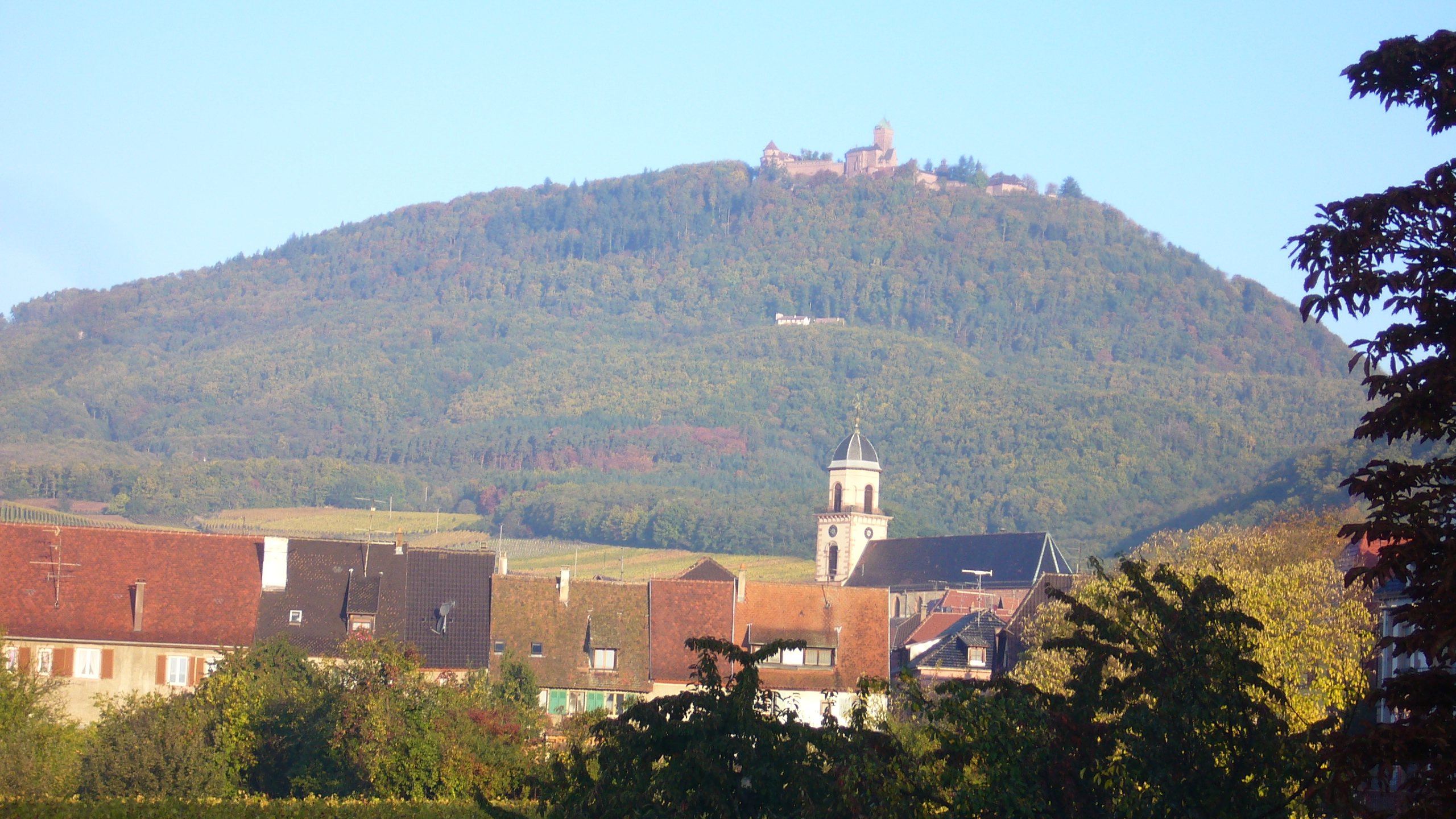
Village of Saint-Hippolyte with the castle of Haut-Koenigsbourg

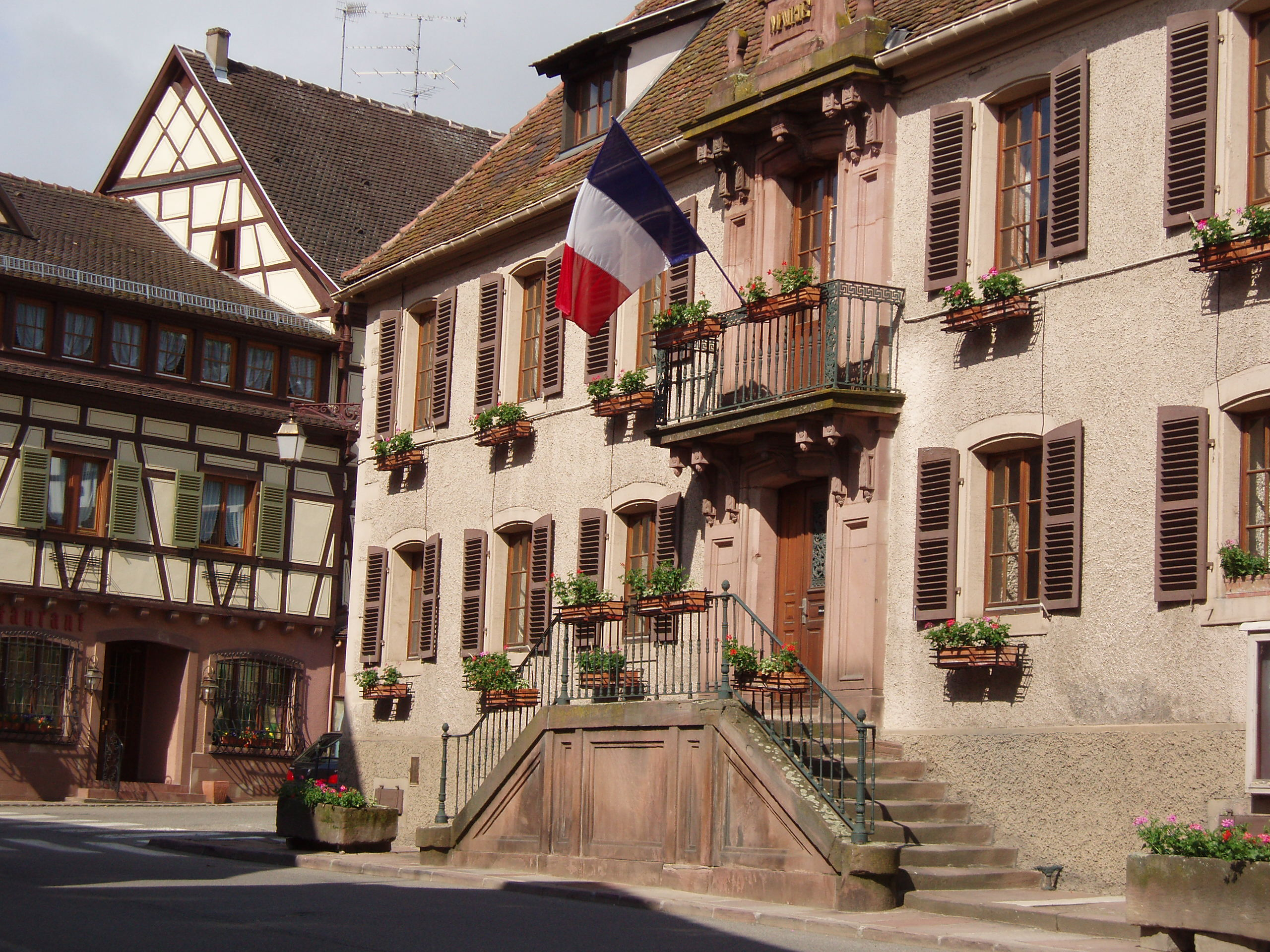
Town hall

Saint-Hippolyte is situated at the foot of the Vosges, to the southwest of Sélestat between Rodern and Orschwiller, and is directly accessible via exit number 18 from the A35 motorway. The town is dominated by the castle of Haut-Koenigsbourg and surrounded by the fertile vineyards which made its reputation.

The old village consists of three parallel streets cut by side streets and alleys between half-timbered houses, forming a compact oblong area still contained within a wall. The village centre contains the church, town hall and a 19th-century school building.

Coal mines are operating in the village.

== History ==
=== Before the 8th century ===
The present Saint-Hippolyte stands on the site of a Neolithic settlement still in use in the Roman period. Under the Carolingians the estate here was known as Andaldovillare or Audaldovillare, derived from the Frankish name "Audaldo".

=== St. Hippolyte's Priory ===
Saint Fulrad (710–784), a relative of the Pippinids, later 14th abbot of the Abbey of Saint-Denis, a powerful politician and diplomat, possessed immense properties in this area. It is generally assumed that this was his birthplace, although there is no direct proof. The cultivation of the slopes of the Langenberg behind the village for the planting of vines is also attributed to him.

While in the service of Pope Stephen II Fulrad obtained the Pope's permission to build two monasteries, one in Saint-Hippolyte and the other in Lièpvre, around which the present settlements grew up. Construction began in 760. In 764 Fulrad also obtained from the pope the relics of Saint Hippolytus, a 3rd-century bishop and martyr, to whom the new monastery was dedicated, and from whom the village later took its name: it is first mentioned as Sankt Pilt in 835.

The monastery was at first a cell of the new priory at Lièpvre, but later became a priory directly under the abbey of St. Denis.

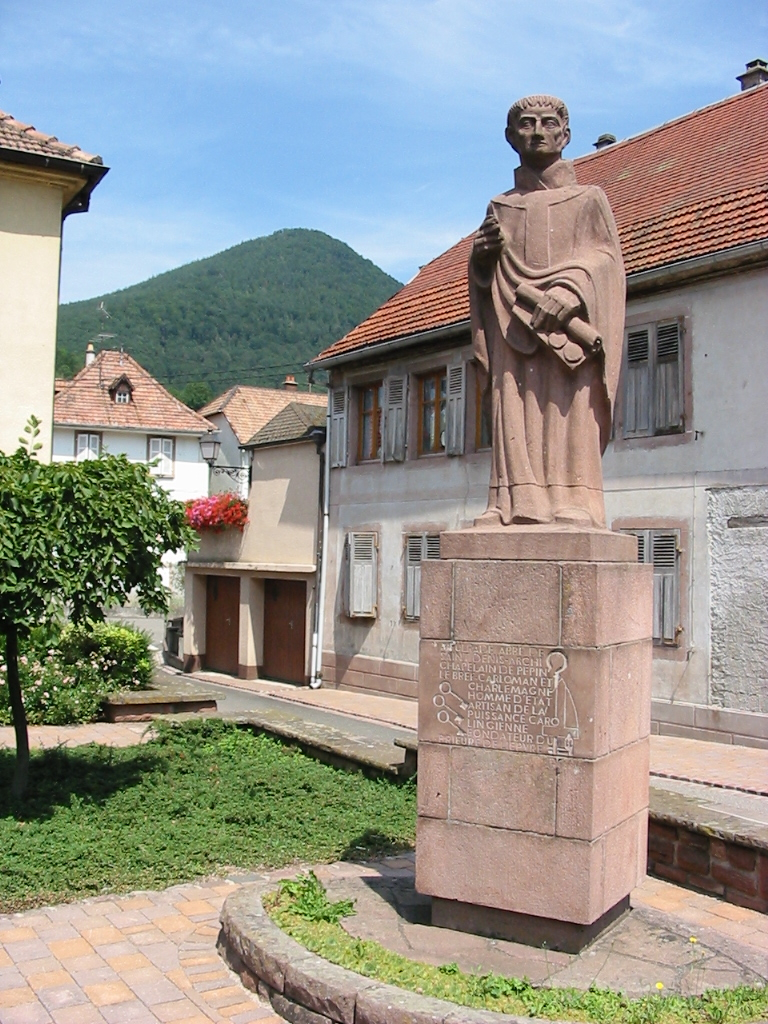
Statue of Saint Fulrad at Lièpvre

The monks of St. Denis were obliged to defend their title to the two priories in 853, when an attempt was made to have them granted as a fief to a royal kinsman. The monks were successful in blocking the move, however, and at length obtained confirmation of their title in the form of a diploma of Lothair I executed at Verdun on 4 August 854.

=== 11th-15th centuries ===
In the 11th century the village became an enclave of Lorraine in Alsace when, despite Fulrad's gift of the village to St. Denis' Abbey, it passed into the hands of the Dukes of Lorraine, who were the abbey's Vögte (advocates) in regard to their possessions in Alsace. Gerhard of Alsace, duke of Lower Lorraine from 1048 to 1070, a descendant of the family of the Etichonen who had ruled Alsace from the 7th century, possessed considerable political influence including the support of Bruno, bishop of Toul, the later Pope Leo IX. This helped him to eventual victory in his fight to retain the ducal title given him by Emperor Henry III, against the claims of the deposed duke, Godfrey the Bearded. Against the background of this conflict Gerhard took possession of the villages of Saint-Hippolyte and Châtenois.

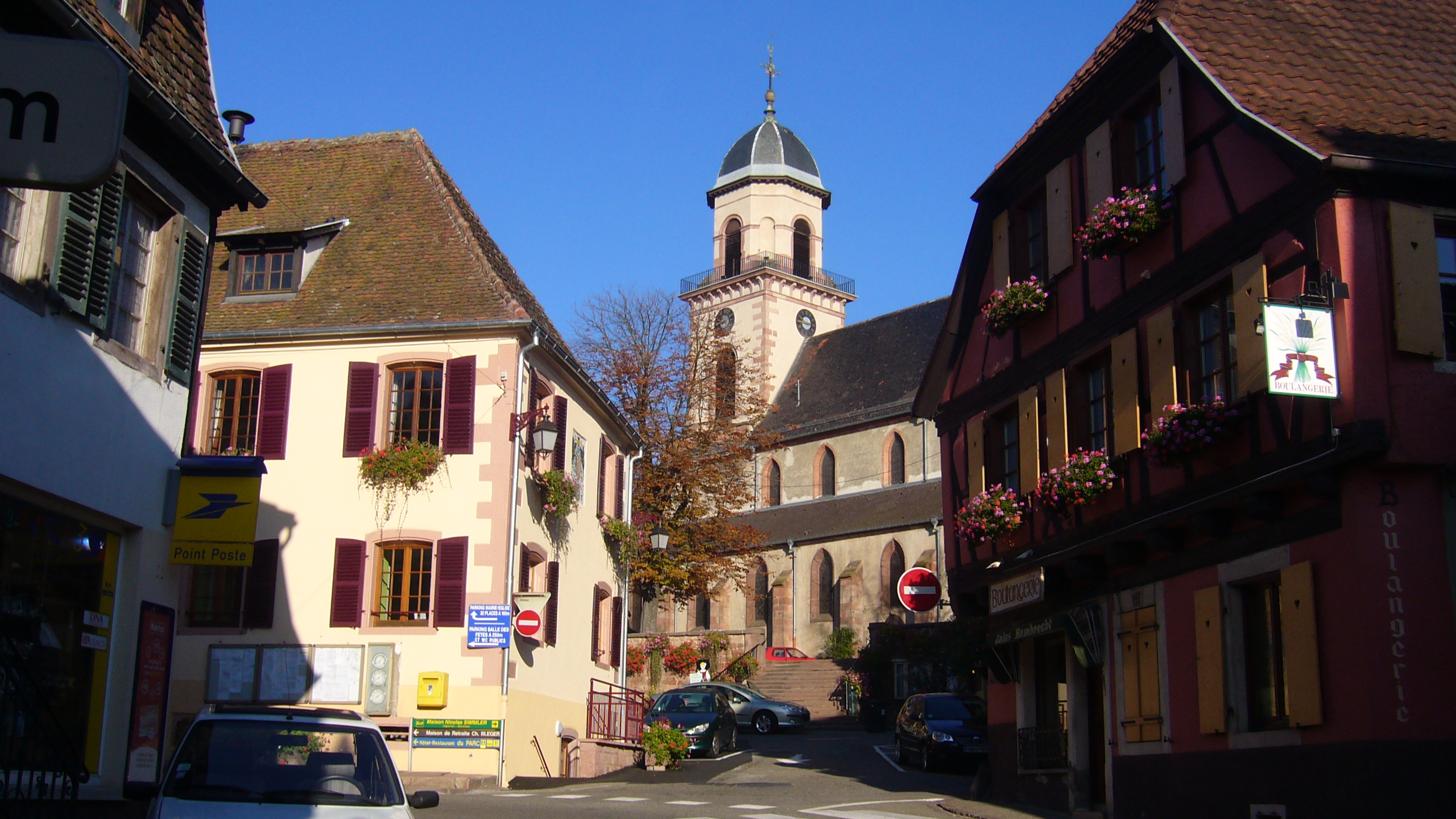
Saint-Hippolyte's church in the middle of the village

The monks of St. Denis' Abbey tried all means of retrieving their possessions, up to and including the forgery of a diploma attributed to Charlemagne supposedly confirming all the abbey's possessions throughout his empire, but in vain. Duke Gerhard remained in possession of St. Hippolyte and in 1052 the abbey was obliged to place St. Hippolyte's Priory under his protection as Vogt in apparent confirmation of his claims, which included the castle of Haut-Koenigsbourg.

A deed of 1078, purportedly made at Saint-Dié, records the return to St. Denis' Abbey by Gerhard's successor, Theodoric II, Duke of Lorraine, of the possessions usurped by his father, and is signed by several high dignitaries of the time both lay and ecclesiastical, including Pibon, bishop of Toul, Theodoric, bishop of Verdun, and Rembald, provost of Saint-Dié, as well as three counts and several other lords. This deed is however also considered a St. Denis forgery by many historians, including Richer of Senones, himself a monk of the Vosges.

The hold of the Dukes of Lorraine on Saint-Hipployte was still not secure, however, and they were next obliged to defend it against the lord of Ribeaupierre and the Landgrave of Alsace, who also had expansionist aims on the village. The Dukes of Lorraine were victorious. Towards 1115 the duke succeeded in setting aside any remaining claims by St. Denis' Abbey, which as it was located not in Alsace or Lorraine but in Paris, was a foreign proprietor. The abbey's protests were futile.

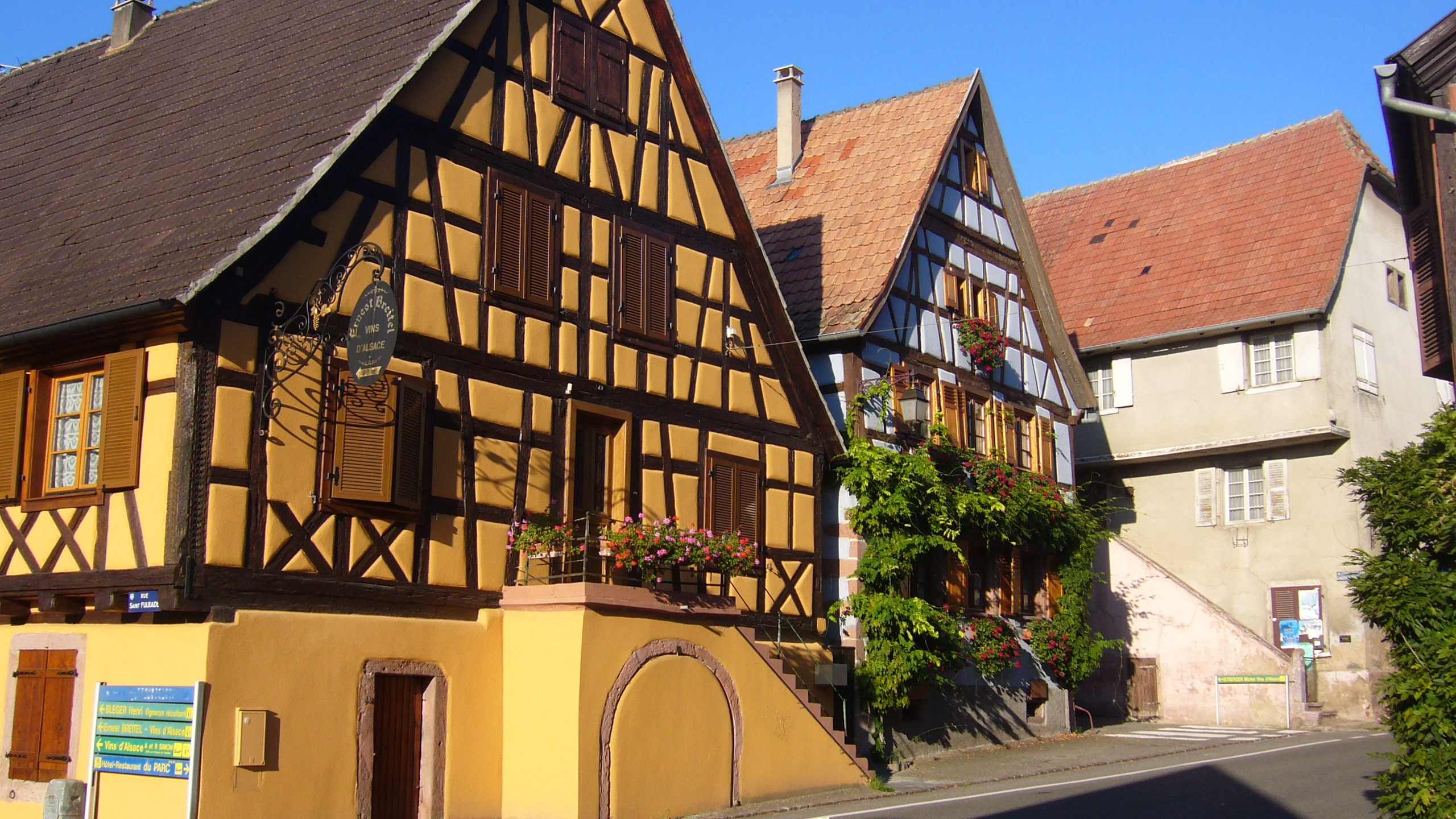
Half-timbered houses in Saint-Hippolyte

In 1250 Matthias II, Duke of Lorraine, granted the castle of Haut-Koenigsbourg in fee to Cuno of Bergheim, with Saint-Hippolyte and Anesheim. The duke however retained the right of reversion, which he later exercised to re-grant the same properties to Heinrich von Werd.

In 1287 Saint-Hippolyte was invaded and burnt down by Anselm II of Ribeaupierre, and the Duke of Lorraine decided to fortify it. In 1290 Lièpvre was given in fee to Henri I, Sire of Blâmont by Duke Frederick III, but he retained Saint-Hippolyte, and in 1310 completely fortified it with walls and unbridgeable ditches. These precautions did not prevent Saint-Hippolyte from undergoing further attacks. In 1316 Frederick IV of Lorraine received the homage of Ulrich of Werd for these same possessions as well as for Frankenbourg and Châtenois. The heirs of Ulrich refused however to recognize the suzerainty of the duke of Lorraine and sold a part of these fiefs to the bishop of Strasbourg, which led to lengthy litigation before the dukes of Lorraine were able to recover their losses.

In 1324, Leopold I, Duke of Austria, in conflict with Louis of Oetingen, seized Saint-Hippolyte and sold it to the bishop of Strasbourg, landgrave of Alsace. In 1365 Duke John I made a grant of his lands here to Burckart of Fenetrange and Schönech. The heirs of the von Werd family did not want to relinquish lands of which they were in possession, and the result was a long dispute settled only in 1369.

In 1370 and 1374 John I, Duke of Lorraine, had twice to re-take possession of Saint-Hippolyte, which he then passed to his father-in-law Eberhard II, Count of Württemberg, who two years later resold it, in 1393, to the bishop of Strasbourg. Eberhard III, Count of Württemberg then took control of Saint-Hippolyte, before returning it to Friedrich von Blankenheim, bishop of Strasbourg. In 1430, Anton von Hattstatt of Viller received a grant for life from Charles II, Duke of Lorraine, of the town of Saint-Hippolyte and the castle of Haut-Koenigsbourg, in return for which Antoine made Charles his heir.

=== City destruction by the Armagnacs ===
In 1349, Alsace was hit by an epidemic of plague, followed by an earthquake on October 1356 which decimated the village. But due to the laborious population, the region later found a certain prosperity. This wealth attracted bands of Bretons, Lombards, Gascons, Spanish, Scots which (receiving the name of Armagnac because of service to the King of France) pillaged the region. These troops are also called " Swindlers ", in Alsace " Schinder " or in Lorraine " Routiers " took with them a crowd of gangsters and adventurers. Commanded by Louis, Dauphin of France (the future Louis XI), they tried at first to seize the city of Basel, but the Swiss led resistance. Louis signed a peace treaty with them in Ensisheim on October 1444. In September 1444, Armagnacs occupied the villages of Châtenois, La Vancelle and Lièpvre. Twice Armagnacs tried to assault the city, but failed, with one of their leaders, Pochon de Rivière, killed during the assault. The Dauphin realized the situation and left when the inhabitants refused to receive his people. The Sire of Commercy occupied the city until 1 January 1445, emptying cellars and attics, plundering houses, hunting inhabitants and keeping only artisans. The Armagnacs had to engage in battles in the nearby municipalities (Sélestat, Bergheim and Ribeauvillé) where groups of companions, Gesellen, slowed down the invaders. On December 3 on 1444, more than one thousand resistors were arrested. The Armagnacs, in front of such a resistance, decided to withdraw in daytime on 1445 to look for fortune somewhere else. But at the time of leaving, they set on fire to part of the city of Saint-Hippolyte. Companions who had managed to leave the city before the arrival of the Armagnacs helped the population. The Armagnacs ambushed and skinned them. They occupied Saint-Hippolyte and pillaged the town. They left it having been dislodged by Erasme of Ribeaupierre, who had begun to worry by the boldness of these adventurers. Under the excuse that the people of Saint-Hippolyte had opened their door to the Armagnacs, they set fire to the last houses still upright. The inhabitants of Saint-Hippolyte, in spite of all these misfortunes, reconstructed their houses and reconditioned the vineyard. After this period of devastation, Saint-Hippolyte passed several times between the hands of new owners, but eventually returned again to the Dukes of Lorraine two years later.

=== Franz von Sickingen seize Saint-Hippolyte ===
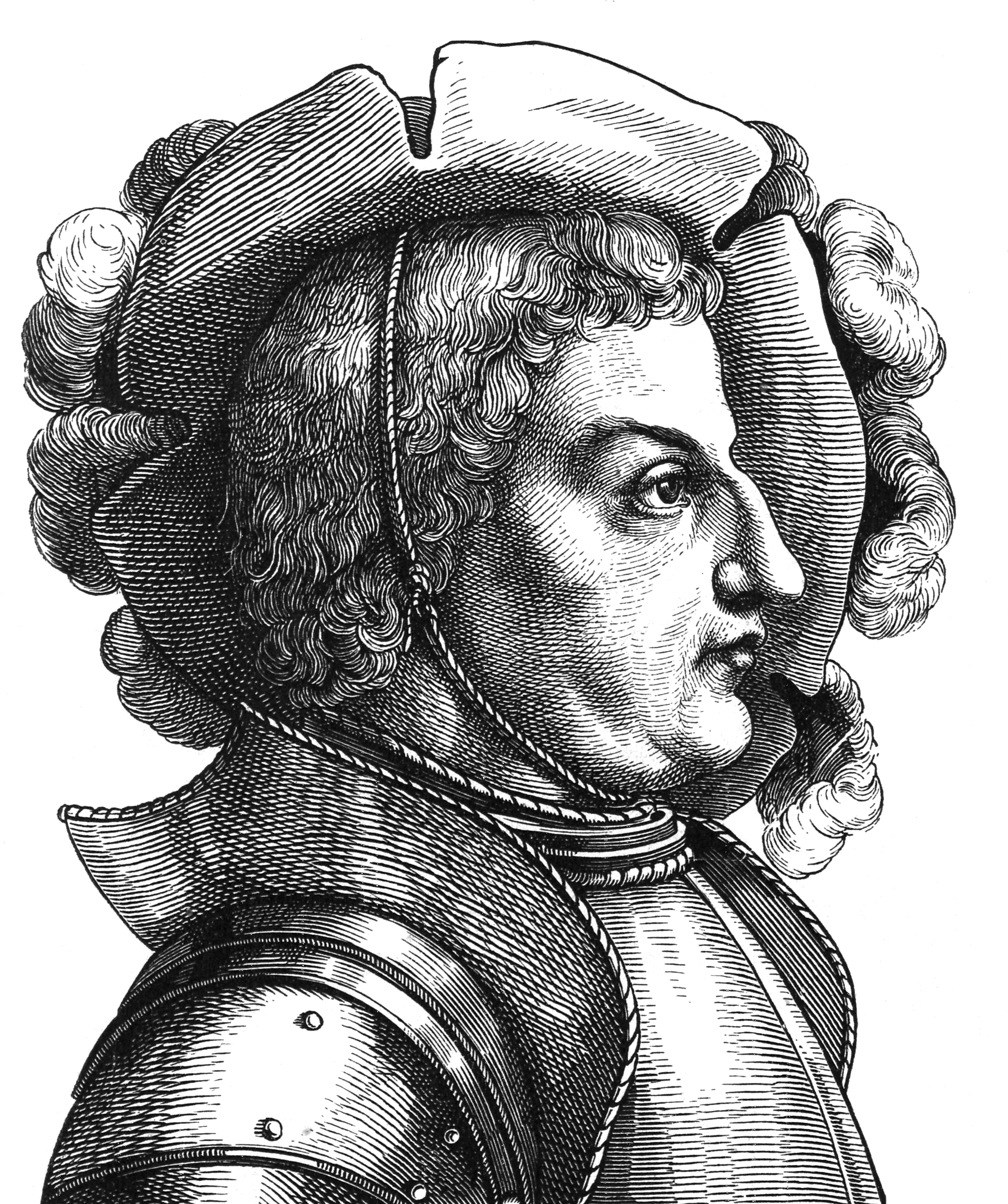
Franz von Sickingen

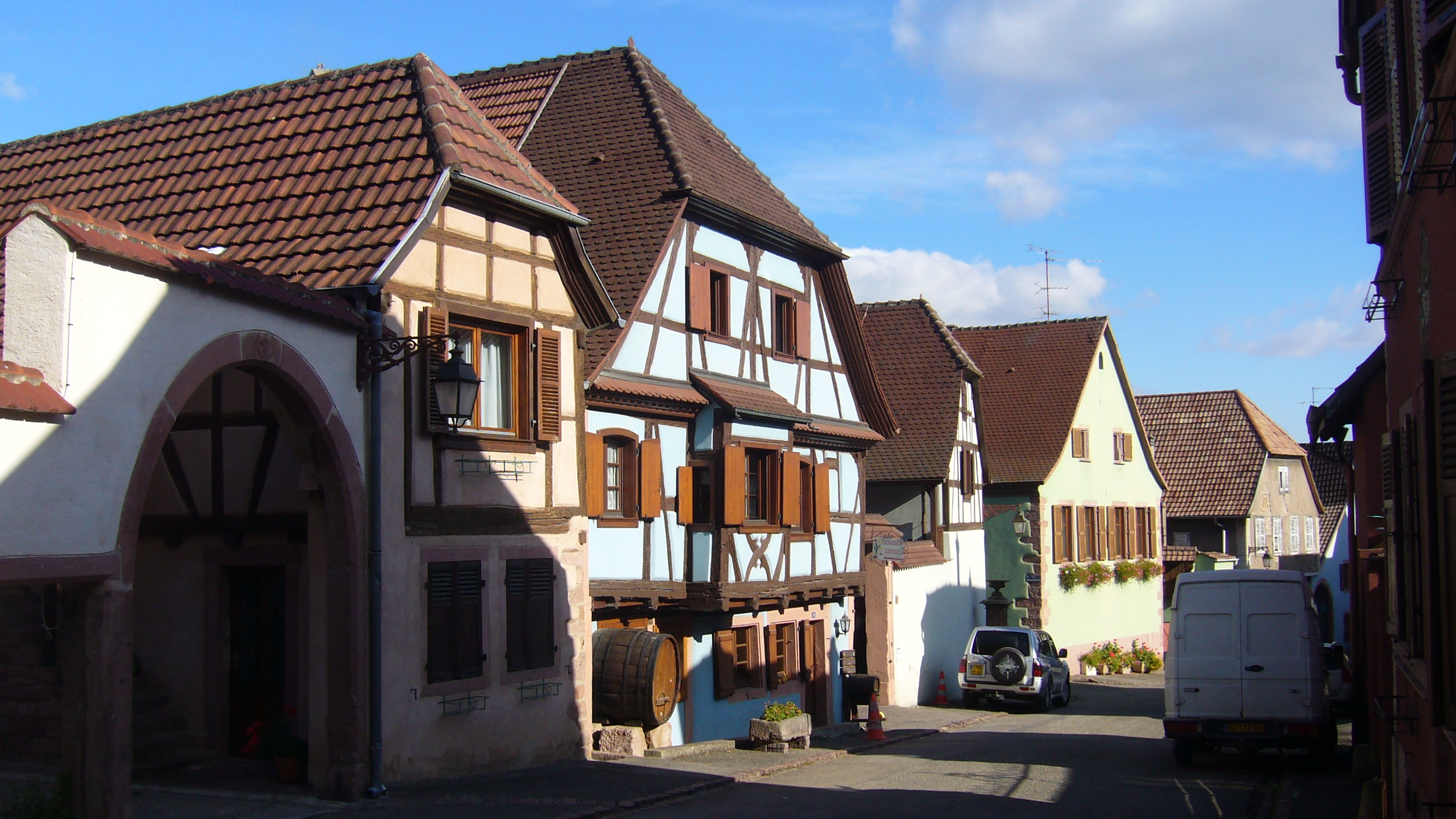
House with half-timbering situated 42 street of Saint-Fulrade to Saint-Hippolytte

In 1516, Franz von Sickingen (1481–1523) a German adventurer who wared at the expense of Geroldseck's Gangolf (1527–1569) near Saverne, near Wangen's house against him duke of Lorraine seized Saint-Hippolyte by surprise with his 6000 soldiers without appointing damages to the city in Valley of Lièpvre. Incapable to triumph the cause with the own forces, he called to the help Sickingen's Franz (François de Sickingen) a first-rate adventurer. This one hurried to run up with a band of 6000 people. It crosses Vosges and invades Lorraine. Duke of Lorraine having bought the neutrality of Sickingen, undid completely the troops of Geroldseck in him Valley of Lièpvre. He made a boss again of Saint-Hippolyte meeting no resistance and cut the head to an inhabitant who had favored the entrance of the enemy. However this expedition of Antoine is not enough to restore completely order. Under excuse to avenge the weak and the oppressed, François de Sickingen carried his devastation in him Electorate of the Palatinate and declared war to the imperial cities and in religious institution. Geroldseck's name often appears in the history of Alsace. One finds one of the branches under the name of Geroldseck-ès-Vosges (In Vosaso, am Wesichim) because of the castles situated in Vosges. She to extinguish in the 16th century. The other family pulled its name of the castle of Hohen-Geroldseck established on one of the summit of her Black Forest near Lahr. To protect in future Valley of Lièpvre and Saint-Hippolyte duke of Lorraine confided the nurse of it from 1516 to an Alsatian Lord who was quite devoted to him (her), the count of Thierstein. François de Sickingen was killed in 1523.

=== Peasants' War ===
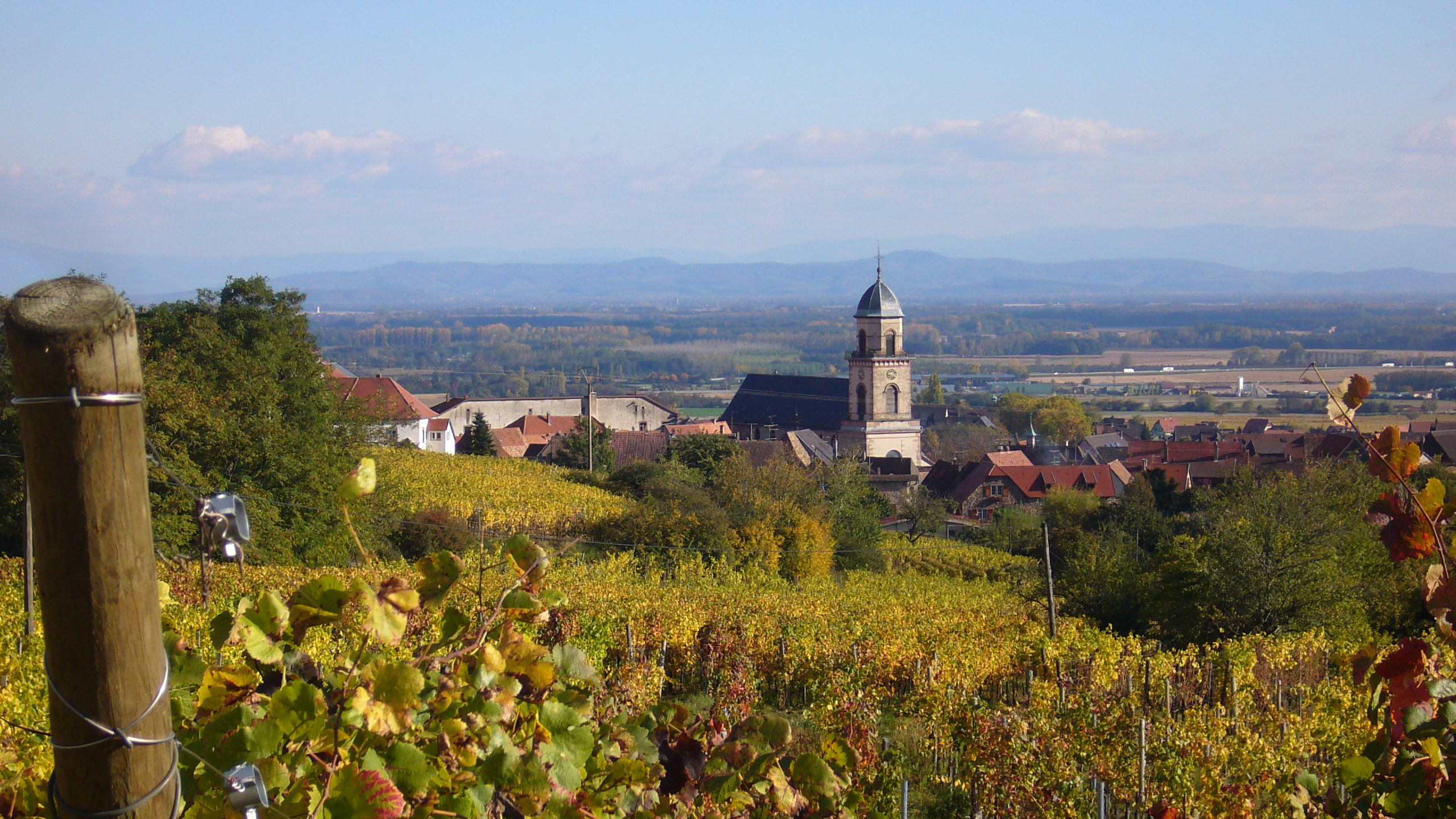
The village seen from the vineyard

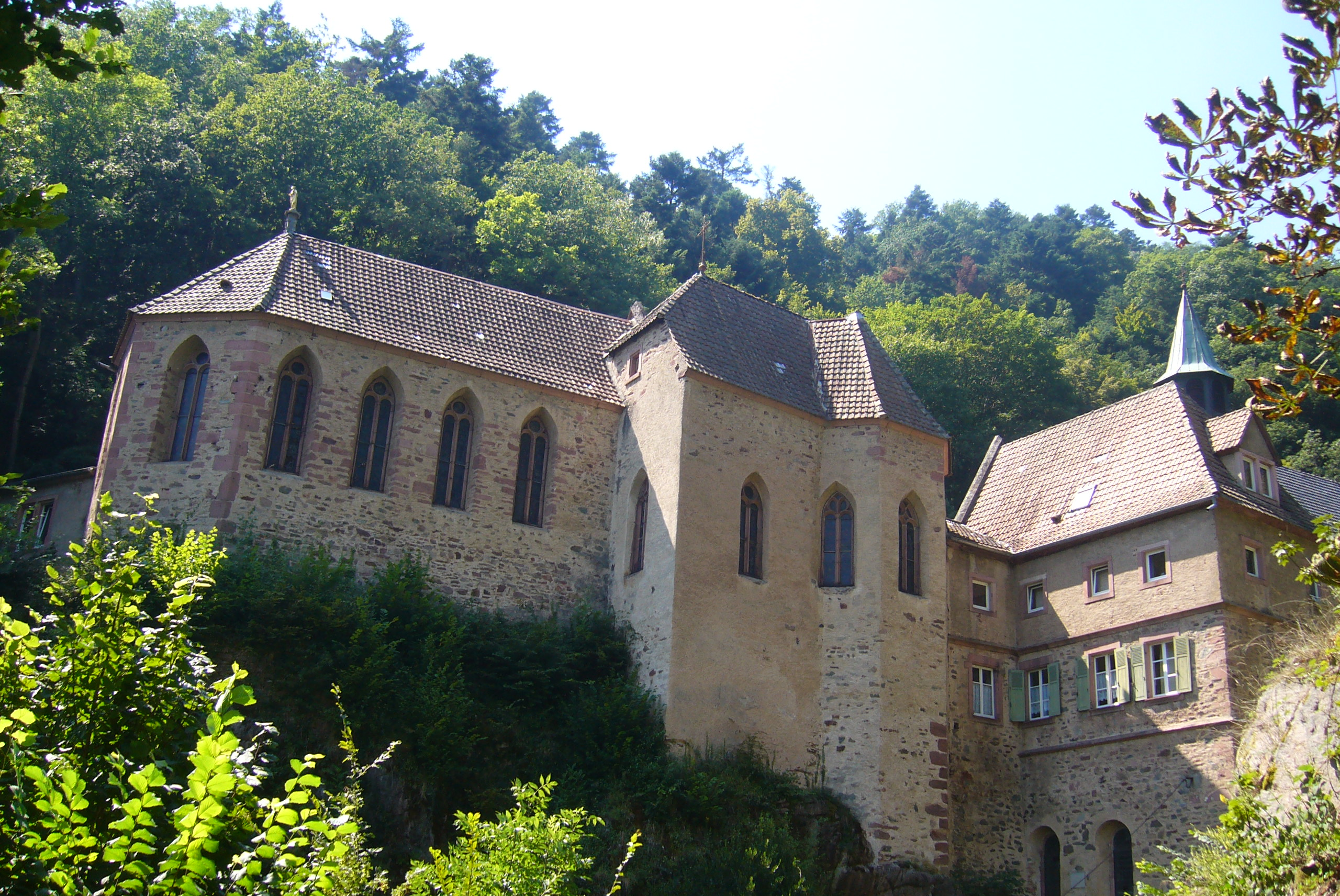
Seen on Dusenbach's chapel Dusenbach

But of new turn were going to appear there Alsace. In April 1524, the farmers lifted up themselves of Basel in Wissembourg. They took the name of Boorish. Their enemies were noble and especially clergy. From February 1525 farmers of the North of the region made known in twelve points their demands for more freedom for the farmers: suppression of the tithe, the right of peach and of hunting, freedom to choose sound Lord. In a short time, these demands made the tour of everybody Alsace, at first claimed calmly, then excesses caused violence. It was in her Low Alsace, towards Molsheim, that movement was the most violent. Revolt won also valley of Villé and the city of Lorraine of Saint-Hippolyte.

The farmers took themselves to one abbey plundering everything en route. Honcourt's abbey, of Andlau, of Baumgarten and of Ebersmunster were destroyed and were burned. The priory of Lièpvre was also partially destroyed. The farmers got ready to go to Lorraine to attack the possessions of duke of Lorraine. They tried to surprise the city of Saint-Dié. But from the arrival of the farmers, the alarm bell was sounded and allowed to scatter them. It was their bigger error. Saint-Dié was defended by a company of lansquenets.

Sought by the Alsatian Lords and bishop of Strasbourg, duke Antoine set up a hardened well army taken by him count of Way and duke of Vaudemont and give up Boorish in Lupstein near Saverne on 16 May 1525. The farmers were equipped simply with forks and with plagues. One counted more than 21 000 deaths. Corpses were thrown in common graves. Believing to have it finished with the Boorish, the duke of Lorraine was warned that farmers join to attack them and to tighten them a trap. Indeed, in May 1525 farmers of Ebersmunster, of Châtenois, of Barr, wanted to join those of Ribeauvillé and those of Saint-Hippolyte to enlarge rows. But the army of duke Antoine crushes them in Scherwiller: 5000 farmers leave with it their life. It set fire in Scherwiller whom it blamed for having opened to them doors, rare occupants were mercilessly chased and killed. Excitement gained also the lands of Lorraine: to Saint-Hippolyte, the priest Wolfgang Schuh, who had been named by the canons of the Saint Georges collegiate church of Nancy, renounced Catholicism, got married and was followed with number of his parishioners. The farmers occupied Saint-Hippolyte on 7 May 1525, with the support of the bourgeoisie, but they did not well stay there for a long time. Duke Antoine sent a detachment to Saint-Hippolyte with for mission to return in the row the contrary. It had moreover no evil to be returned order in his distant city of Lorraine. Duke was all the more discontented as he held his as particularly irresponsible subjects to have listened to speeches fired with the Boorish. Some had even got on toward the reformation. The priest Wolfang Schuh (1493–1525) was arrested for crime of heresy in May 1525 by Gaspard d' Haussonville, governor of Blâmont and leads in Nancy and condemned to be burned on a wood-house on 20 June 1525.

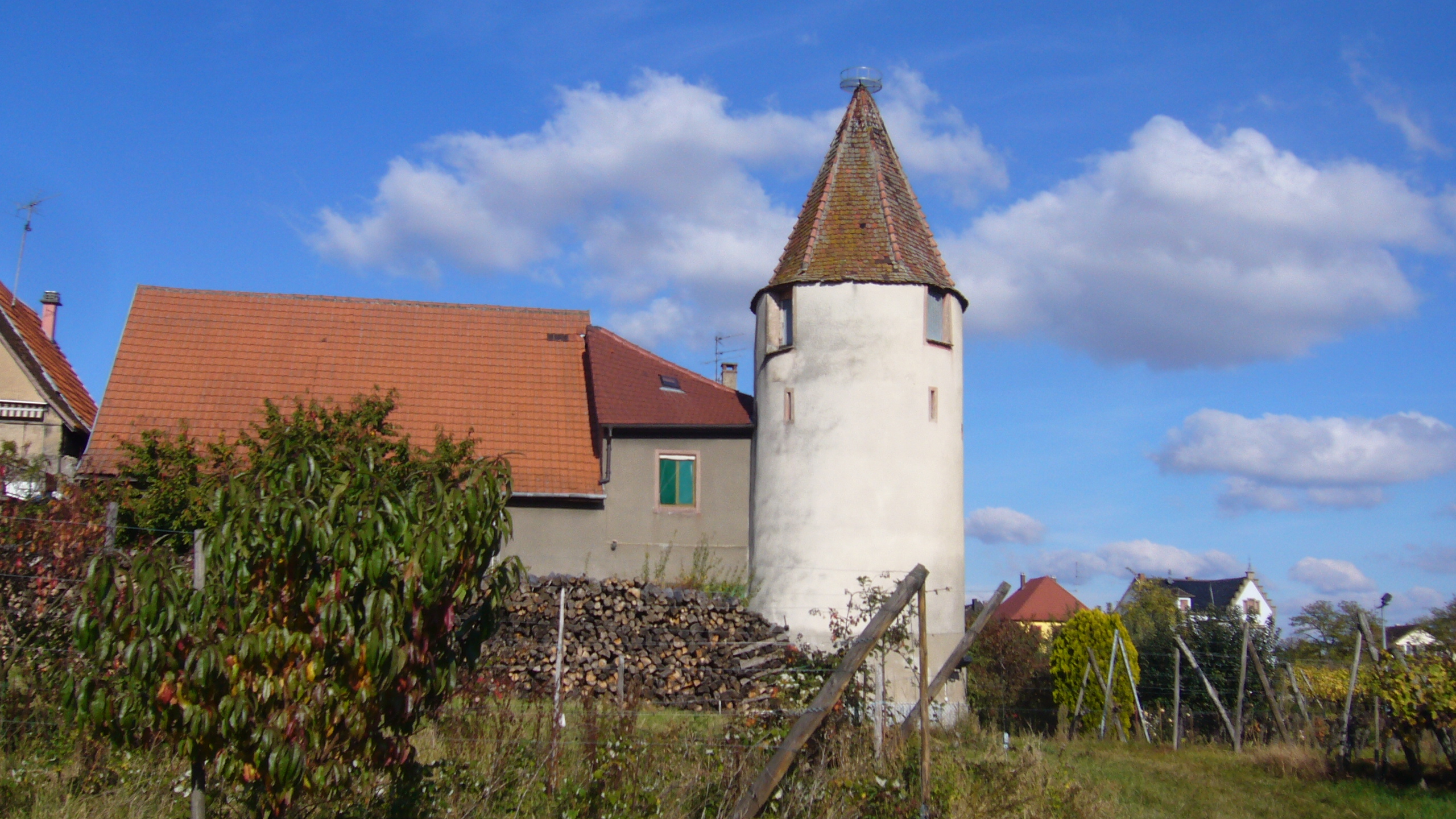
Tower of storks

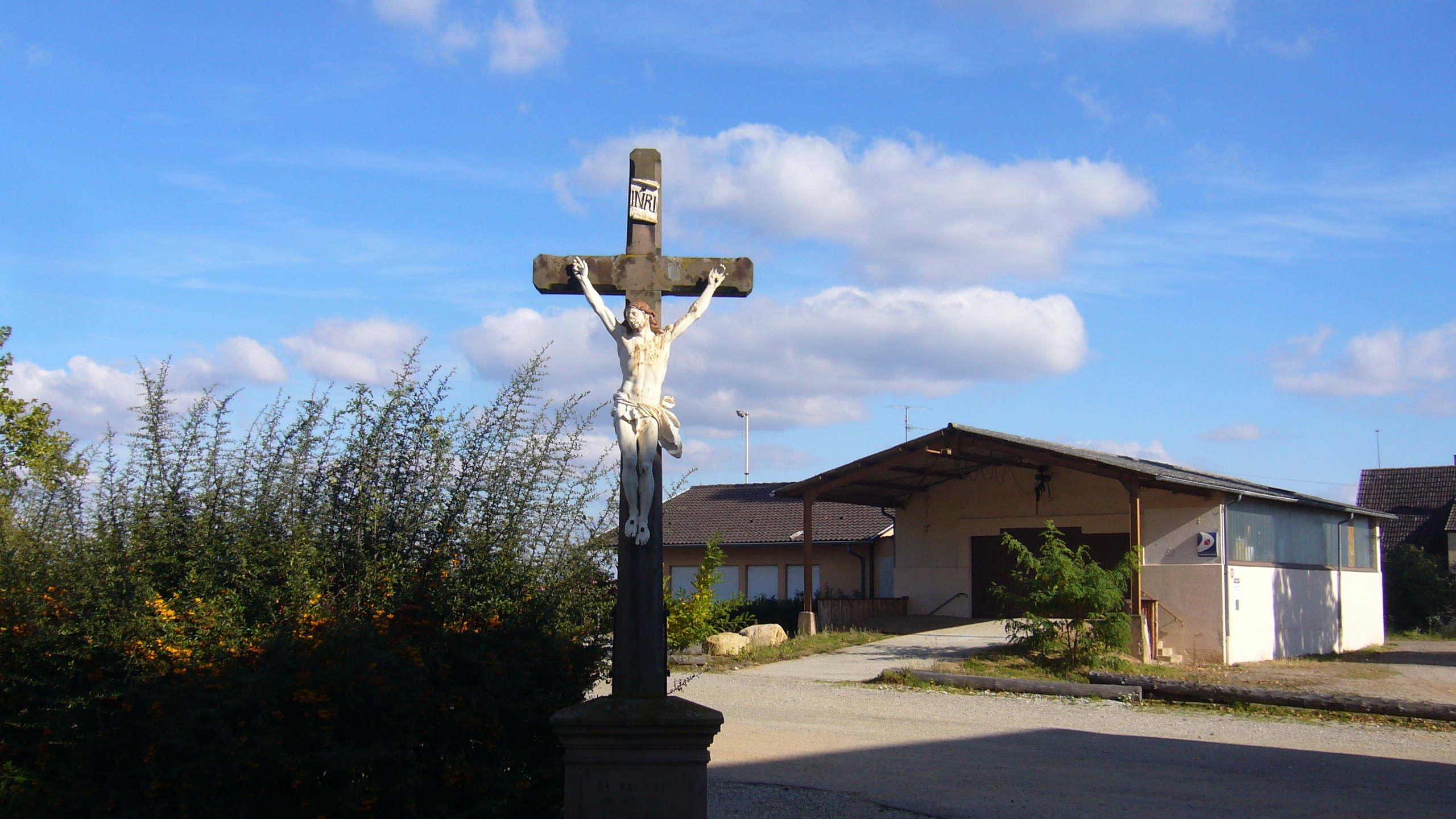
Calvary near the chapel of the Holy cross

The inhabitants of Saint-Hippolyte, including the children from seven to twelve years, in sign of punishment, should walk barefoot and head discovered in procession wax candle to the hand, until the sanctuary of Dusenbach. They have to restore all the ornaments removed in church and convent, to fast every Friday and to overturn tithe and the others royalty in him church. They have also to send every year in duke of Lorraine twelve cart-load of good white wine of twenty four measures each. In the middle of 16th century, Saint-Hippolyte become again a city prospers. She was surrounded with robust bulwarks and with a rather deep ditch. Dukes of Lorraine went in the summer months to Saint-Hippolyte to go hunting there in the nearby mountains. The rest of time the city was lived by one governor or bailli who represented duke of Lorraine who was charged to take care of the order and to perceive royalties and taxes variously. In 1564, this function had by Widranges's Olry (Ulrich von Wittringen) son of Jean de Widranges, Lord of Thanvillé. He was named a captain and a conductor in the city. The inhabitants of Saint-Hippolyte did not love him and for a long time he remained unpopular with the population. Since 1551, the seigneury of Ortenberg or of Villé belonged to the powerful family of Bollwiller. Nicolas, baron of Bollwiller and untervogt of Alsace, administered Valley of Villé by a superior bursar, Jean-Jacques de Ostein and by an officer, Armand Widmann. It was with these last ones that Widranges's Olry had big contesting. Olry of Widranges had to defend the interests of duke of Lorraine to Saint-Hippolyte against the companies of the Sire of Ribeaupierre. Soon it was put in contesting with the middle-class persons of Saint-Hippolyte himself. These last ones were not very easy to steer. In 1504, they had rebelled and had wanted to massacre their captain Jean of Cover. Jean de Widranges had a grievous tendency to press his fellow countrymen in tax, duty, and taille variously. The representatives of the city eventually complained with duke of Lorraine who proceeded to an inquiry on the spot which joined the assertions of the population. He had on top of big difficulties with his neighbour the Lord of Villé. Duke wanted absolutely to have a positive image with the inhabitants of his (its, her) distant Alsatian city of Lorraine. It was arrested, was sent back in Nancy and discharged of the title and imprisoned in 1568 in Nancy where he died in 1589. It was replaced to Saint-Hippolyte by Jean de Silières chancellor of Christine of Denmark. A sculptured paving stone and polychromée fixed to the north facade of the city hall calls back the recollection of Widranges's Ulrich. On the paving stone represent the weapons of Lorraine, below of which one notes registration: " Ulrich von Wittringen on 1566. "

=== Witch-hunt ===
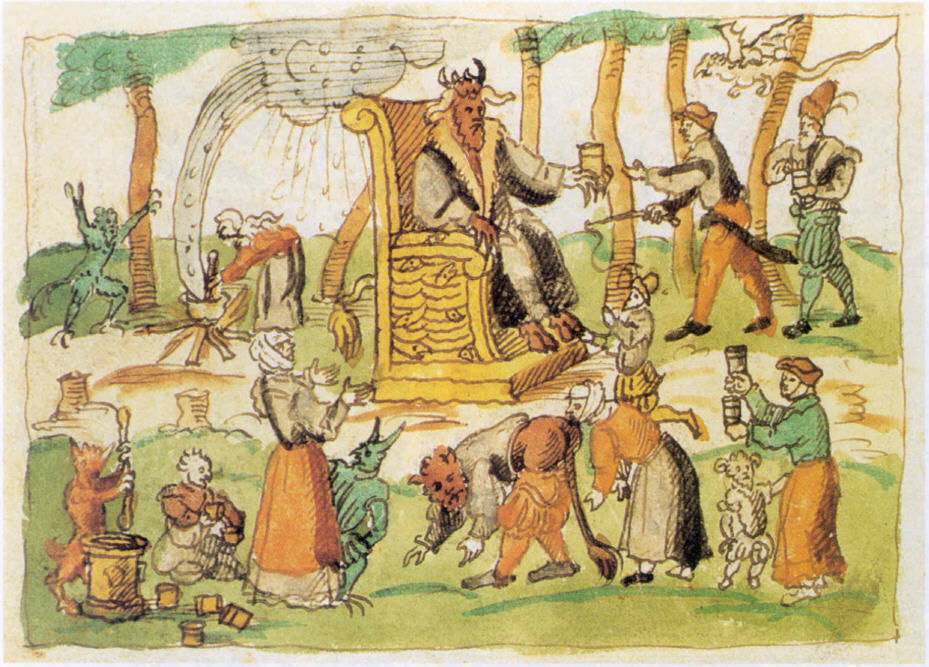
Sabbath of Witches - Johann Jacob Wick's chronicle (16th century)

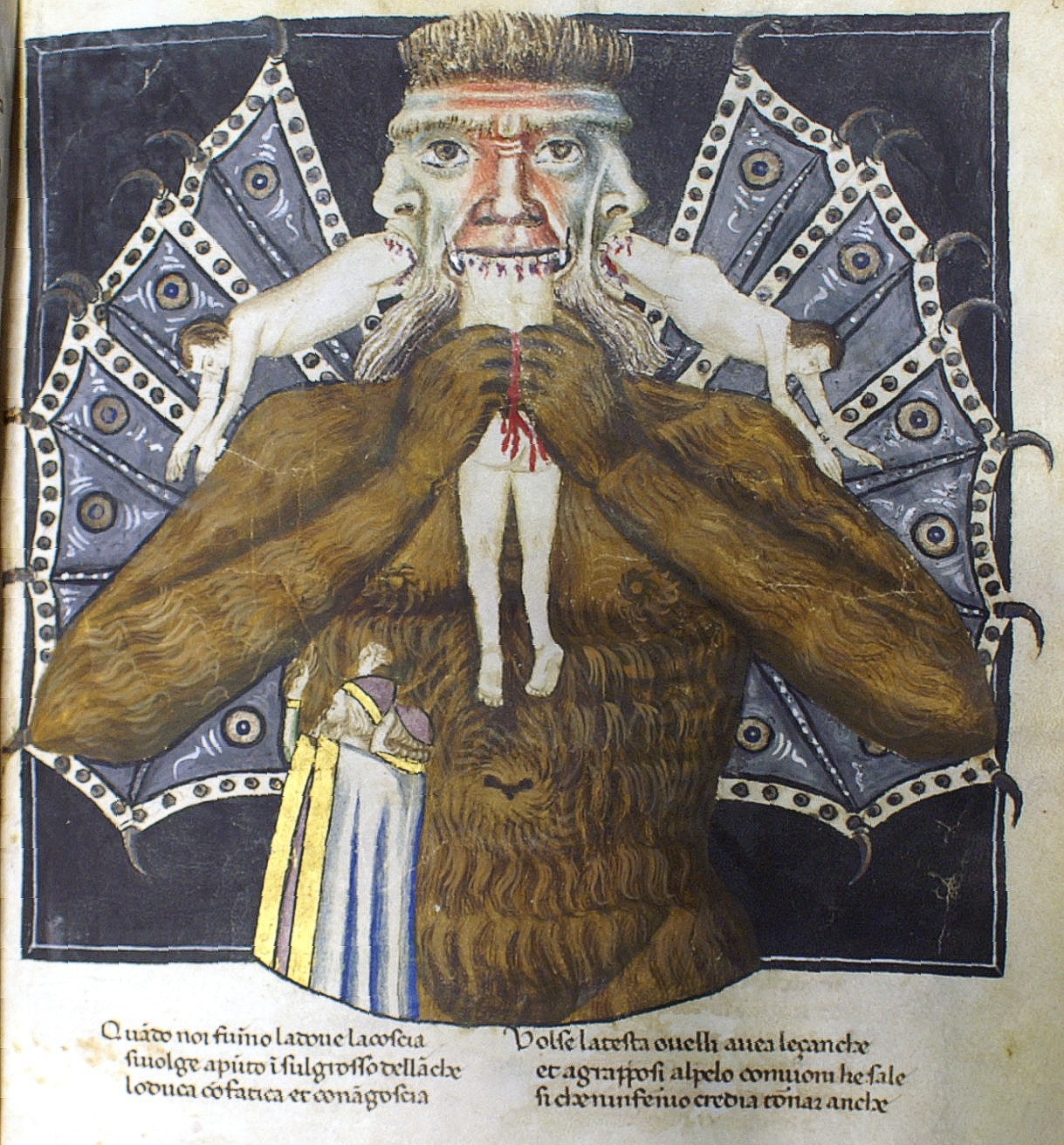
Representation of the devil of the Codex Altonensis

Among on 1560 and 1600, Alsace had to regret a real witch-hunt. Only in Colmar, Turckheim and Sélestat one had sent to the wood-house 42 accused women of witchcraft. They had admitted under tortures the worst misdeeds. The plague touched Bergheim a little later when a gigantic lawsuit appeared 35 women accused of witchcraft native eight of which of Saint-Hippolyte and two of Thannenkirch. One blamed them for having asked in Satan to bring down the hail and to have so been responsible for the devastation of her vineyard. The other one was accused for having made rot grape just before grape harvests. The others were still accused for having made turn wine and to make him unfit in the consumption or for one other one to have made die one cow. Under her torture one admitted to these poor women of the improbable scenes. Some of them admitted to meet themselves the night together with devil which had taken a human shape, with which they ate, drank, sang and danced and were also accused for having maintained with him devil a carnal business. Certain living "witches" Bergheim, Rorschwihr or Châtenois admitted to have got some money or donations in kind. They told to have been transported by a goose, a goat or a broomstick somewhere near " Landgraben " or the mill say " Bruchmühle " or still to Kleinforst in Saint-Hippolyte. On the 35 women accused of witchcraft, the only one liked head the indicters. She died under the torture. At the time of paying, one sparrow penetrated into the premises and stands out there rashly. The judge following this event asserted that devil had tried to get back the soul of her witch. Most of the time the so-called witches were simple women, credibly tramps or Romani which had managed to extort money and from donations in kind to a little bit gullible inhabitants.

== See also ==
- Communes of the Haut-Rhin department

== Bibliography ==
- Baquol, Jacques: L'Alsace ancienne et moderne ou dictionnaire topographique, historique et statistique du Haut-Rhin et du Bas-Rhin, Salomon, 1865 - 3e édition refondue par Paul Ristelhuber (Reprint 1976)
- Aubé, Jean-Paul: Saint-Hippolyte au XVIe et XVIIe siècle d'après les archives conservées à Nancy.- Ducs de Lorraine: territoires et possessions, p. 155-193, Revue d'Alsace, 2003
- Bapst, Edmond: Les sorcières de Bergheim, Paris, 1929
- Fleckenstein, Josef: Fulrad von Saint-Denis und der fränkische Ausgriff in den süddeutschen Raum dans G.Tellenbach, Studien un Vorabeitzn zur Geschichte des fräkischen und früdeutschen Adels, Fribourg-en-Brisgau, 1957, p. 9-39
- Grandidier, Philippe André: Lièvre et Saint-Hippolyte - Oeuvre indédites de Grandidier, tome 1, Revue d'Alsace, H. Georg, 1865, Colmar, Imprimerie et Lithographie de Camille Decker, 585 pages
- Grandidier, Philippe, André: Nouvelles oeuvres inédites de Grandidier, tome 3 - Alsatia Sacra ou statistiques écclésiastique et religieuse de l'Alsace avant la Révolution avec oeuvres inédites de Schoepflin - Lièpvre et Saint-Hippolyte - Colmar, H.Huffel, M.DCCC.XCIX, p. 201-202
- Grandidier, Philippe, André: Lièvre et Saint-Hippolyte: Histoire de l'église et des évêques-princes de Strasbourg depuis la foundation de l'évêché jusqu'à nos jours - Imprimerie François Levrault, Strasbourg, 1776
- Grandidier, Philippe, André: Histoire écclésiastique, militaire, civile et littéraire de la province Alsace, Strasbourg, 1787, Lorenzii et Schulrerri (T.1) et Levrault (T.2)
- Nick, Jean-Marie: Saint-Hippolyte, ville lorraine. Bulletin de l'Association des châteaux forts et villes fortifiées d'Alsace, p. 84-87, 2000
- Petetin, Francis: Saint-Hippolyte: principaux vestiges médiévaux. Association des châteaux forts et villes fortifiées d'Alsace, p. 88-89, 2000
- Trendel, Guy et Carmona, Christophe: Le Haut-Koenigsbourg et sa région, Editions Pierron, Sarreguemines, 1998
