= Labaroche =

Commune in Grand Est, France

- Commune
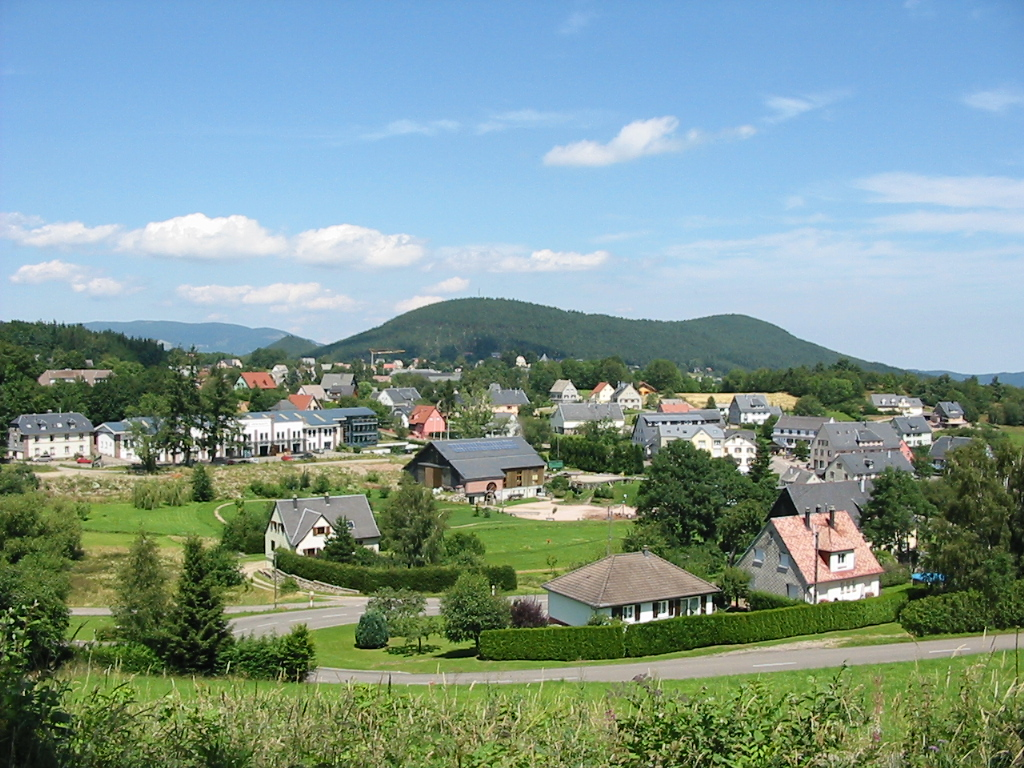
- A general view of Labaroche

- Coat of arms
- Location of Labaroche
- Location within France Location within Grand Est
- Coordinates: 48°06′38″N 7°11′38″E
- Country: France
- Region: Grand Est
- Department: Haut-Rhin
- Arrondissement: Colmar-Ribeauvillé
- Canton: Sainte-Marie-aux-Mines
- Intercommunality: Vallée de Kaysersberg

Government
  - Mayor (2020–2026): Bernard Ruffio
- Area^{1}: 13.44 km^{2} (5.19 sq mi)
- Elevation: 750 m (2,460 ft)
- Highest elevation: 980 m (3,220 ft)
- Lowest elevation: 420 m (1,380 ft)
- Population (2023): 2,231
  - Density: 166.0/km^{2} (429.9/sq mi)
- Time zone: UTC+01:00 (CET)
  - Summer (DST): UTC+02:00 (CEST)
- INSEE/Postal code: 68173 /68910
- ^{1} French Land Register data, which excludes lakes, ponds, glaciers > 1 km^{2} (0.386 sq mi or 247 acres) and river estuaries.

Labaroche (French pronunciation: [labaʁɔʃ]; German: Zell) is a commune in the Haut-Rhin department in Grand Est in north-eastern France.

It is located in the Vosges mountains at an average altitude of 750 m. There is a post-office, a bank, several hotels, a little super-market, a salon de thé, 2 boulangeries, and a museum, Le Musée des métiers du bois. To the south of the village, on top of a mountain called Petit Hohnack, stands the ruin of a medieval castle.

== Population ==
Historical population
Year	Pop.	±% p.a.
1968	1,157	—
1975	1,204	+0.57%
1982	1,483	+3.02%
1990	1,676	+1.54%
1999	1,985	+1.90%
2007	2,202	+1.31%
2012	2,244	+0.38%
2017	2,165	−0.71%
2023	2,231	+0.50%
Source: INSEE

== See also ==
- Communes of the Haut-Rhin département
