= Aubure =

Commune in Grand Est, France

- Commune
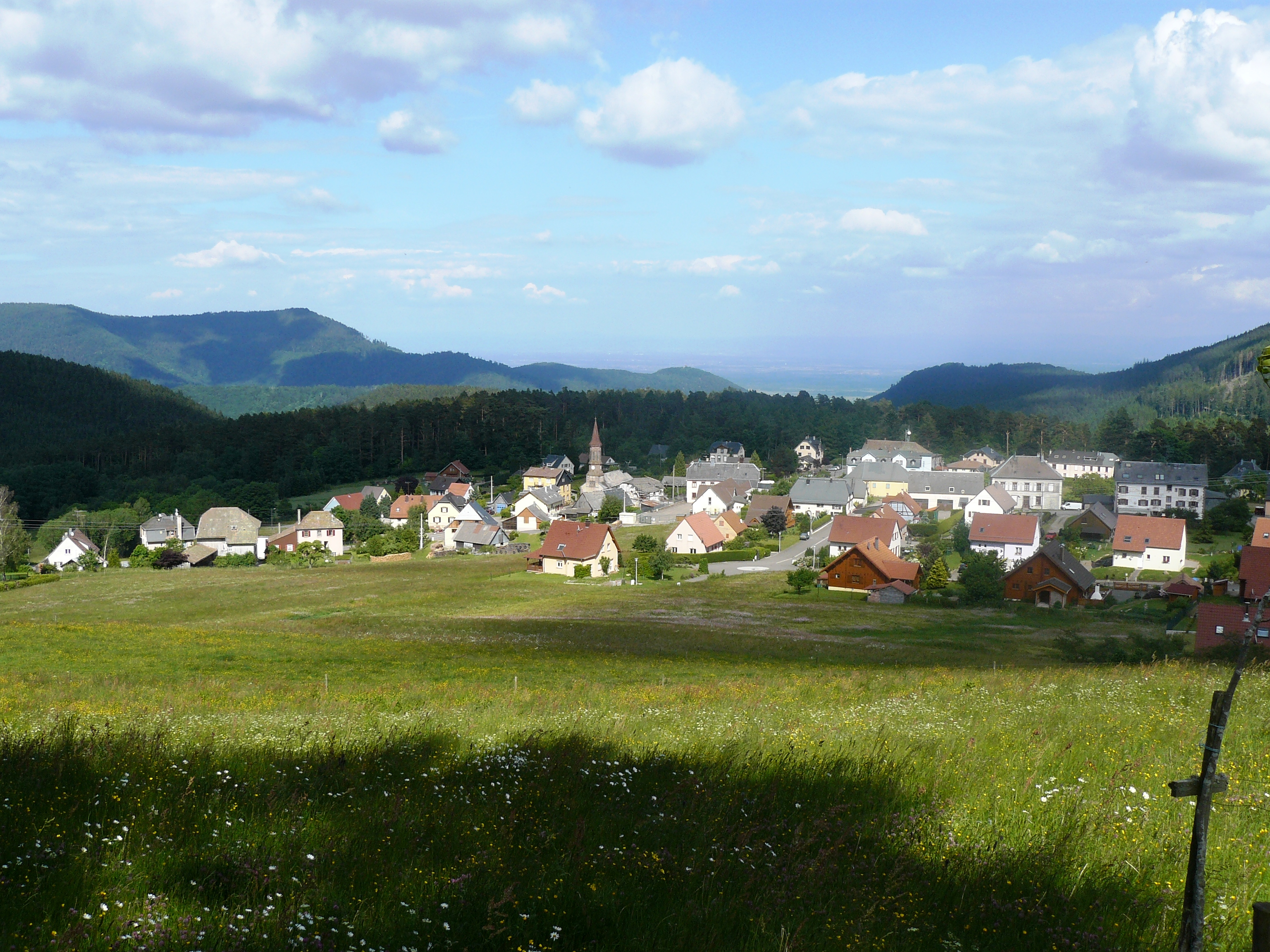
- A general view of Aubure

- Coat of arms
- Location of Aubure
- Location within France Location within Grand Est
- Coordinates: 48°11′53″N 7°13′19″E
- Country: France
- Region: Grand Est
- Department: Haut-Rhin
- Arrondissement: Colmar-Ribeauvillé
- Canton: Sainte-Marie-aux-Mines
- Intercommunality: CC Pays Ribeauvillé

Government
  - Mayor (2020–2026): Marie-Paule Gay
- Area^{1}: 4.9 km^{2} (1.9 sq mi)
- Elevation: 800 m (2,600 ft)
- Highest elevation: 1,144 m (3,753 ft)
- Lowest elevation: 727 m (2,385 ft)
- Population (2023): 353
  - Density: 72/km^{2} (190/sq mi)
- Time zone: UTC+01:00 (CET)
  - Summer (DST): UTC+02:00 (CEST)
- INSEE/Postal code: 68014 /68150
- ^{1} French Land Register data, which excludes lakes, ponds, glaciers > 1 km^{2} (0.386 sq mi or 247 acres) and river estuaries.

Aubure (French pronunciation: [obyʁ]; German: Altweier; Alsatian: Àltwihr) is a commune in the Haut-Rhin department in Grand Est in north-eastern France.

== See also ==
- Communes of the Haut-Rhin department
