= Katzenthal =

Commune in Grand Est, France

- Commune
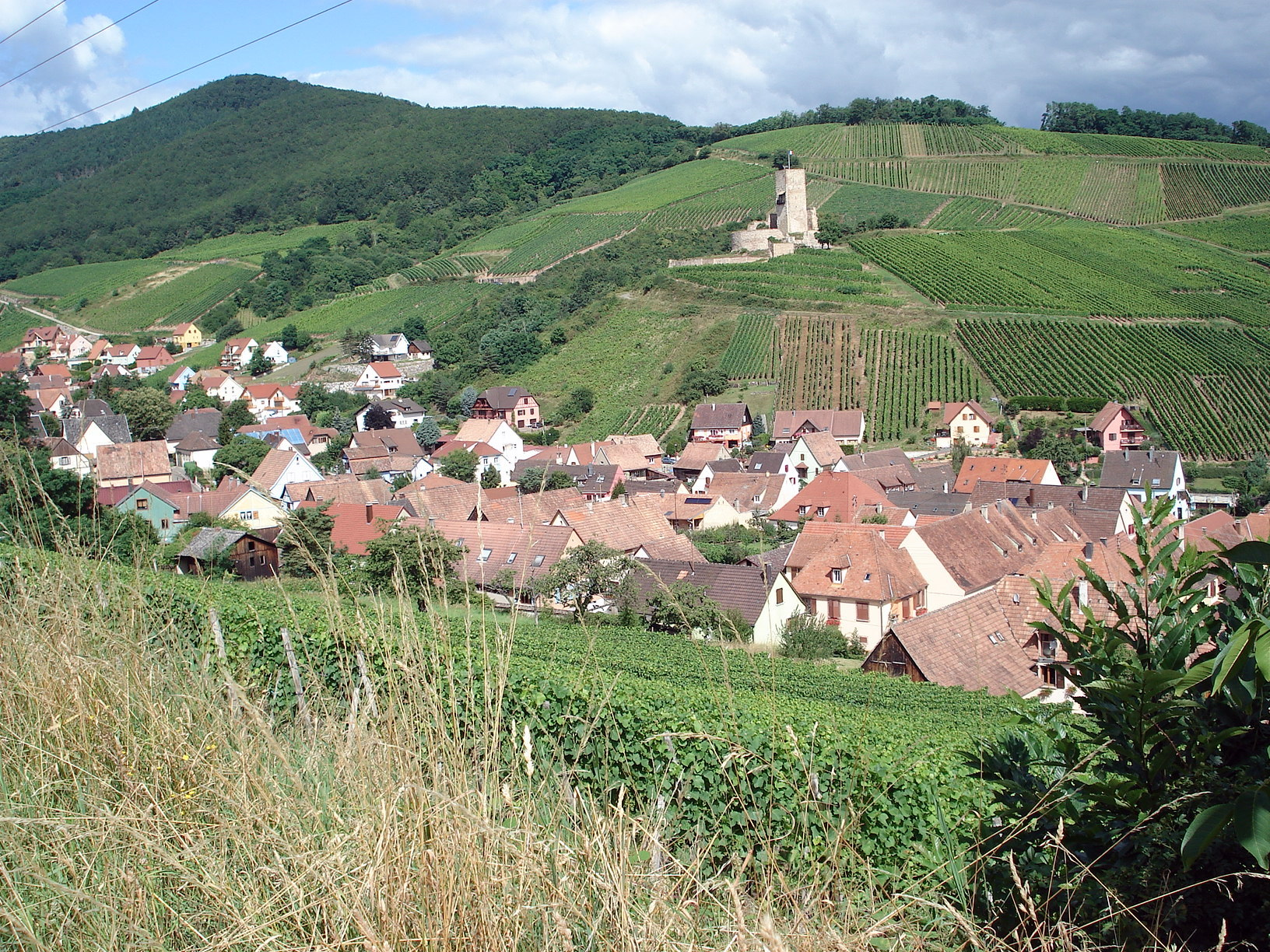
- A general view of Katzenthal

- Coat of arms
- Location of Katzenthal
- Location within France Location within Grand Est
- Coordinates: 48°06′30″N 7°16′58″E
- Country: France
- Region: Grand Est
- Department: Haut-Rhin
- Arrondissement: Colmar-Ribeauvillé
- Canton: Sainte-Marie-aux-Mines
- Intercommunality: Vallée de Kaysersberg

Government
  - Mayor (2020–2026): Nathalie Tantet-Lorang
- Area^{1}: 3.5 km^{2} (1.4 sq mi)
- Elevation: 280 m (920 ft)
- Highest elevation: 660 m (2,170 ft)
- Lowest elevation: 210 m (690 ft)
- Population (2023): 506
  - Density: 140/km^{2} (370/sq mi)
- Time zone: UTC+01:00 (CET)
  - Summer (DST): UTC+02:00 (CEST)
- INSEE/Postal code: 68161 /68230
- ^{1} French Land Register data, which excludes lakes, ponds, glaciers > 1 km^{2} (0.386 sq mi or 247 acres) and river estuaries.

Katzenthal (French pronunciation: [katsəntal]) is a commune in the Haut-Rhin department in Grand Est in north-eastern France.

== Population ==
Historical population
Year	Pop.	±% p.a.
1968	483	—
1975	528	+1.28%
1982	505	−0.63%
1990	505	+0.00%
1999	497	−0.18%
2007	544	+1.14%
2012	538	−0.22%
2017	528	−0.37%
2023	506	−0.71%
Source: INSEE

== See also ==
- Communes of the Haut-Rhin département
