= Thanvillé =

- Commune
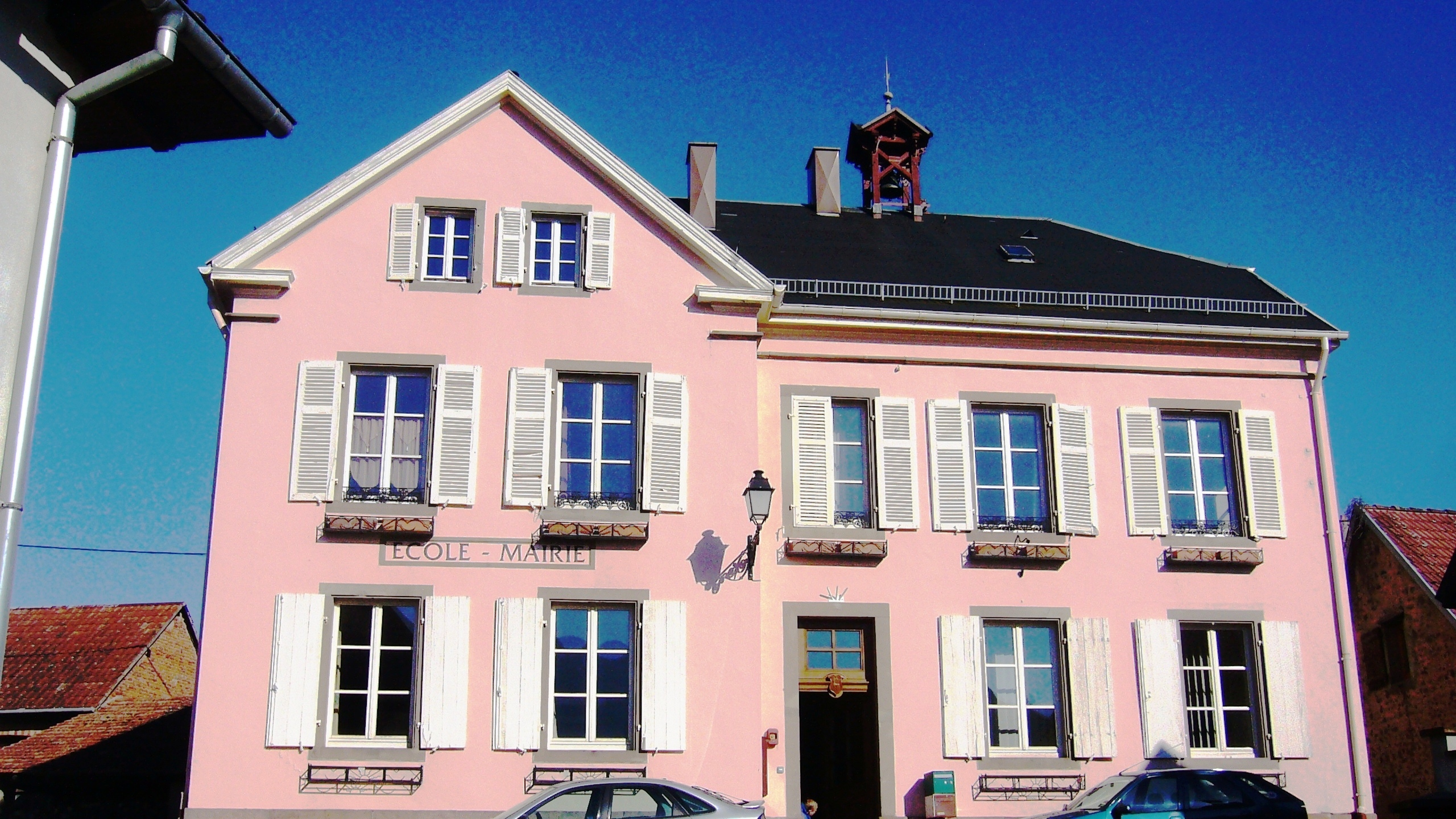
- The town hall in Thanvillé

- Coat of arms
- Location of Thanvillé
- Location within France Location within Grand Est
- Coordinates: 48°19′24″N 7°21′04″E
- Country: France
- Region: Grand Est
- Department: Bas-Rhin
- Arrondissement: Sélestat-Erstein
- Canton: Mutzig

Government
  - Mayor (2020–2026): Patrick Buhl
- Area^{1}: 1.91 km^{2} (0.74 sq mi)
- Highest elevation: 307 m (1,007 ft)
- Lowest elevation: 225 m (738 ft)
- Population (2023): 623
  - Density: 326/km^{2} (845/sq mi)
- Time zone: UTC+01:00 (CET)
  - Summer (DST): UTC+02:00 (CEST)
- INSEE/Postal code: 67490 /67220
- ^{1} French Land Register data, which excludes lakes, ponds, glaciers > 1 km^{2} (0.386 sq mi or 247 acres) and river estuaries.

Thanvillé (French pronunciation: [tɑ̃vile]; German: Thannweiler) is a commune in the Bas-Rhin department in Alsace in north-eastern France.

== See also ==
- Communes of the Bas-Rhin department
