= Canton of Sainte-Marie-aux-Mines =

French canton created in March of 2015

Coordinates: 48.25°N 7.18°E

The canton of Sainte-Marie-aux-Mines is an administrative division of the Haut-Rhin department, northeastern France. Its borders were modified at the French canton reorganisation which came into effect in March 2015. Its seat is in Sainte-Marie-aux-Mines.

It consists of the following communes:

1. Ammerschwihr
2. Aubure
3. Beblenheim
4. Bennwihr
5. Bergheim
6. Le Bonhomme
7. Fréland
8. Guémar
9. Hunawihr
10. Illhaeusern
11. Katzenthal
12. Kaysersberg Vignoble
13. Labaroche
14. Lapoutroie
15. Lièpvre
16. Mittelwihr
17. Orbey
18. Ostheim
19. Ribeauvillé
20. Riquewihr
21. Rodern
22. Rombach-le-Franc
23. Rorschwihr
24. Saint-Hippolyte
25. Sainte-Croix-aux-Mines
26. Sainte-Marie-aux-Mines
27. Thannenkirch
28. Zellenberg
