= Guémar =

Commune in Grand Est, France

- Commune
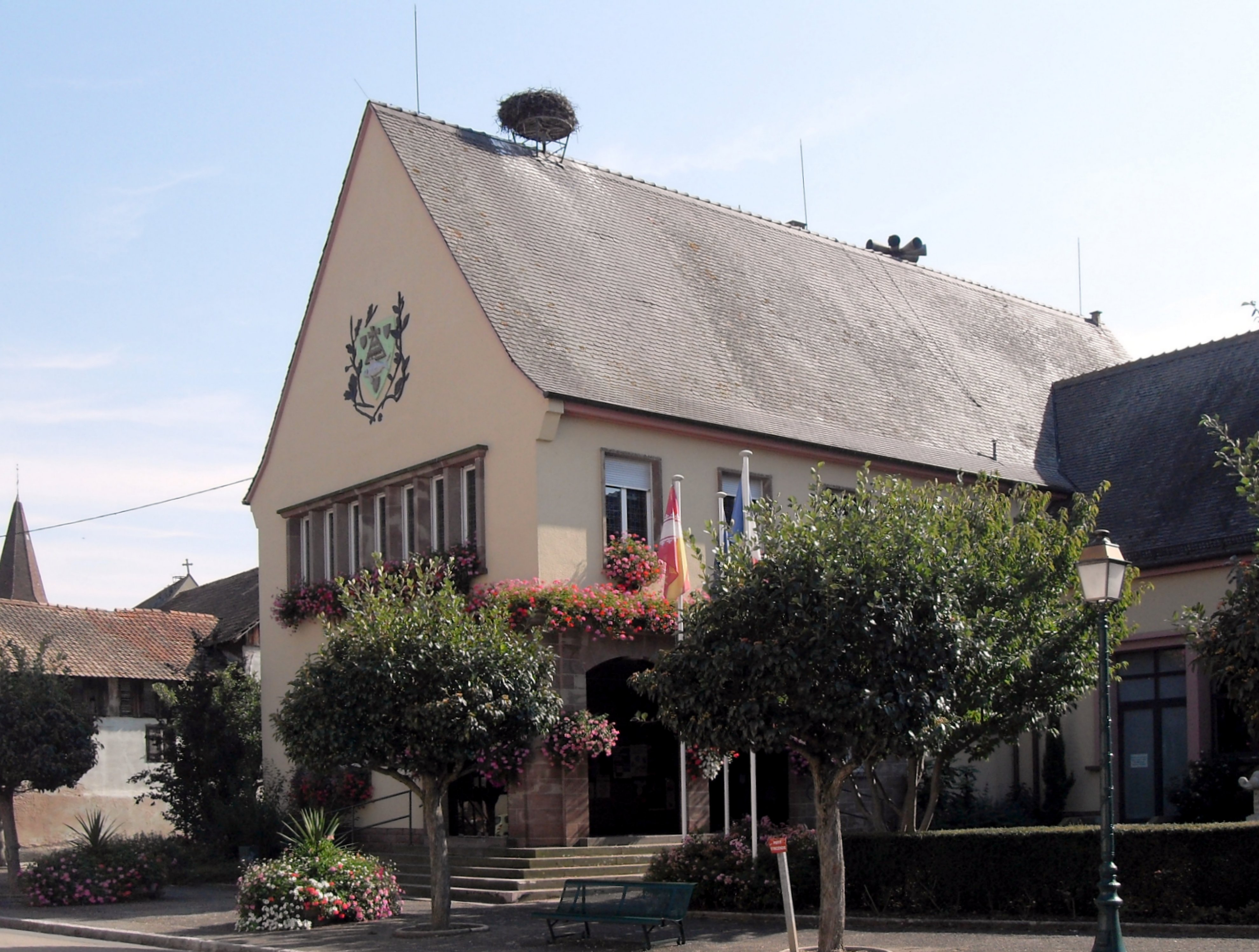
- The town hall in Guémar

- Coat of arms
- Location of Guémar
- Location within France Location within Grand Est
- Coordinates: 48°11′22″N 7°23′51″E
- Country: France
- Region: Grand Est
- Department: Haut-Rhin
- Arrondissement: Colmar-Ribeauvillé
- Canton: Sainte-Marie-aux-Mines
- Intercommunality: Pays de Ribeauvillé

Government
  - Mayor (2020–2026): Umberto Stamile
- Area^{1}: 18.22 km^{2} (7.03 sq mi)
- Highest elevation: 193 m (633 ft)
- Lowest elevation: 172 m (564 ft)
- Population (2023): 1,490
  - Density: 81.8/km^{2} (212/sq mi)
- Time zone: UTC+01:00 (CET)
  - Summer (DST): UTC+02:00 (CEST)
- INSEE/Postal code: 68113 /68970
- ^{1} French Land Register data, which excludes lakes, ponds, glaciers > 1 km^{2} (0.386 sq mi or 247 acres) and river estuaries.

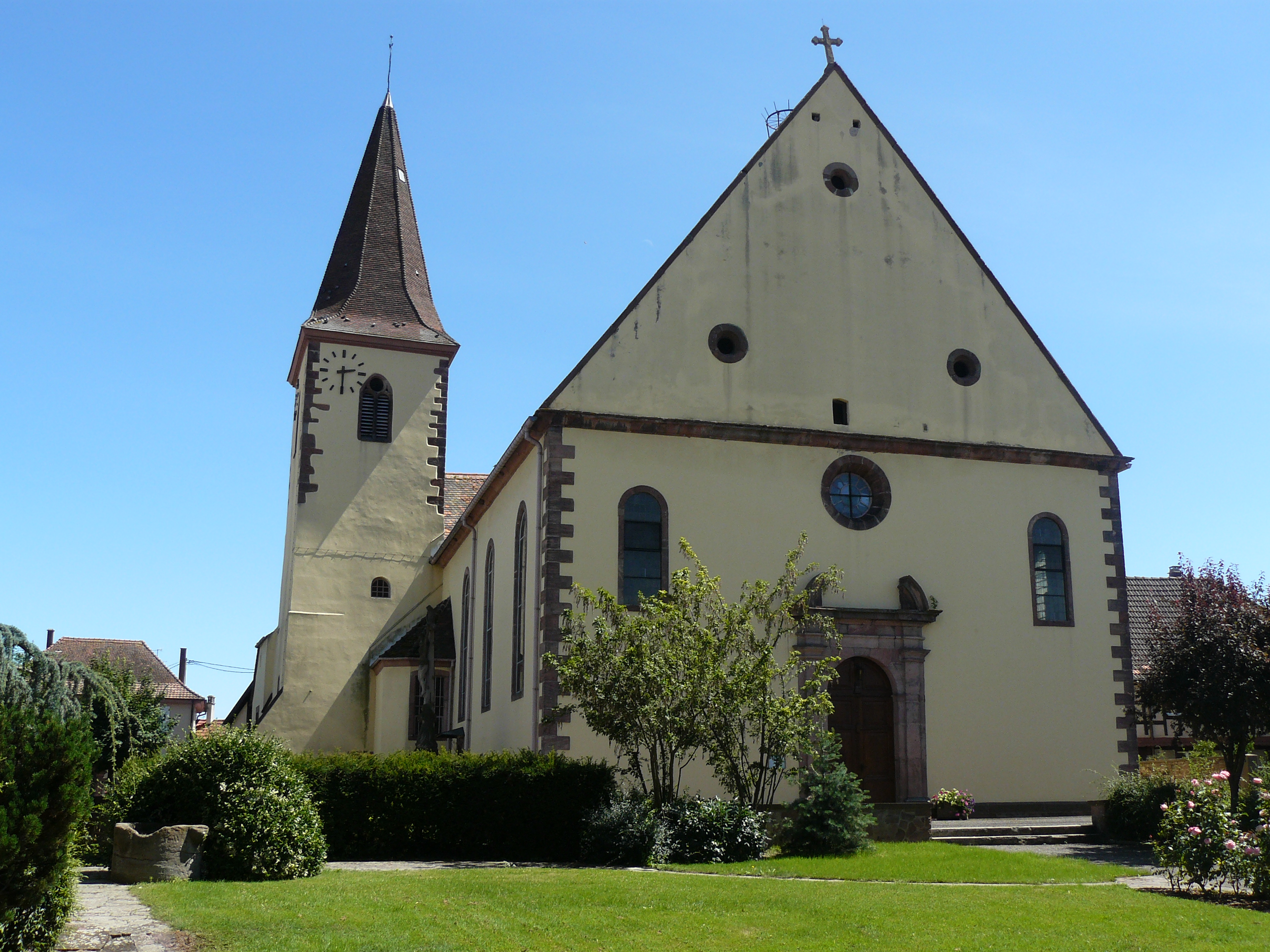
Church in Guémar

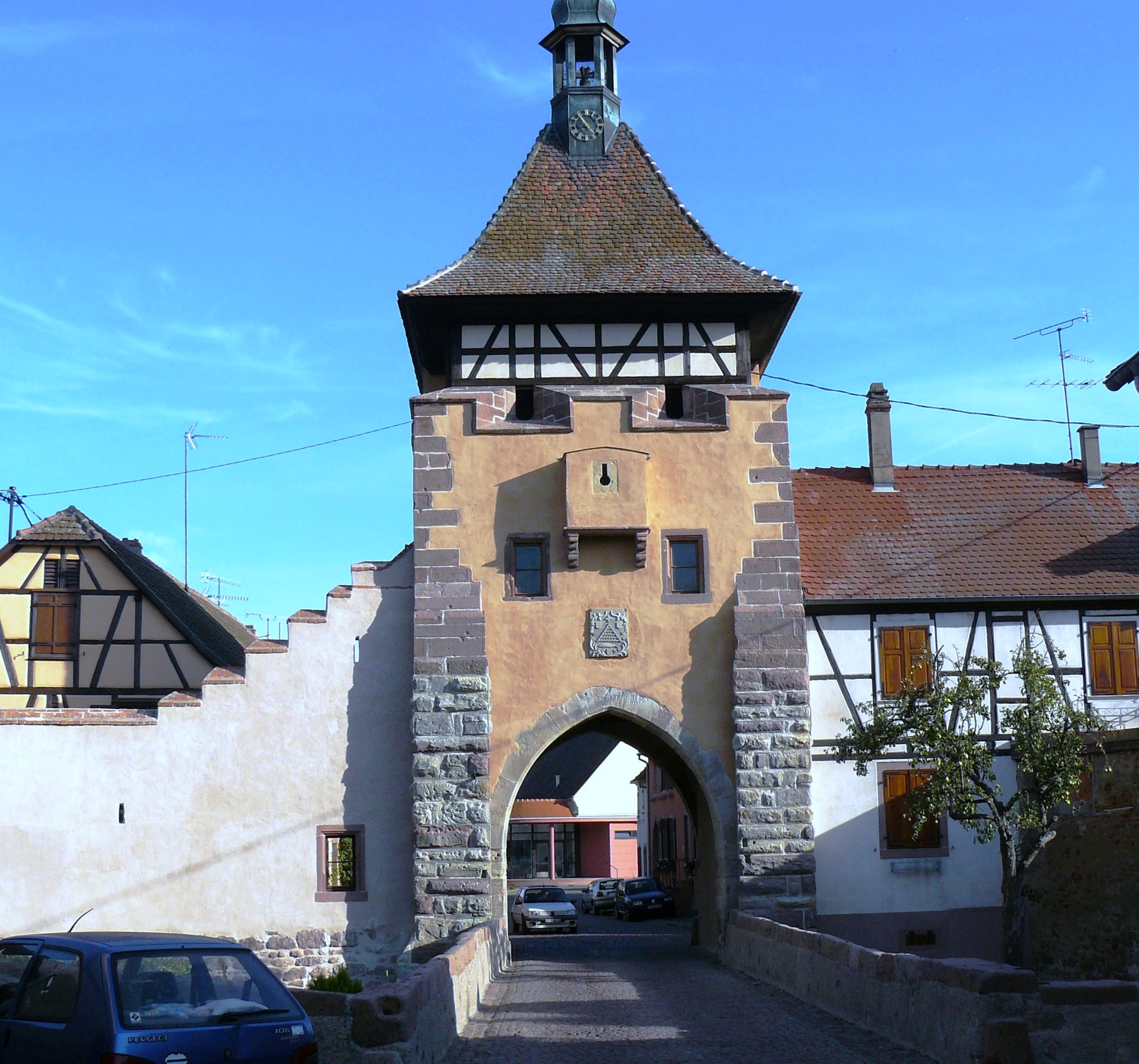
Medieval timber-framed city gate in Guémar

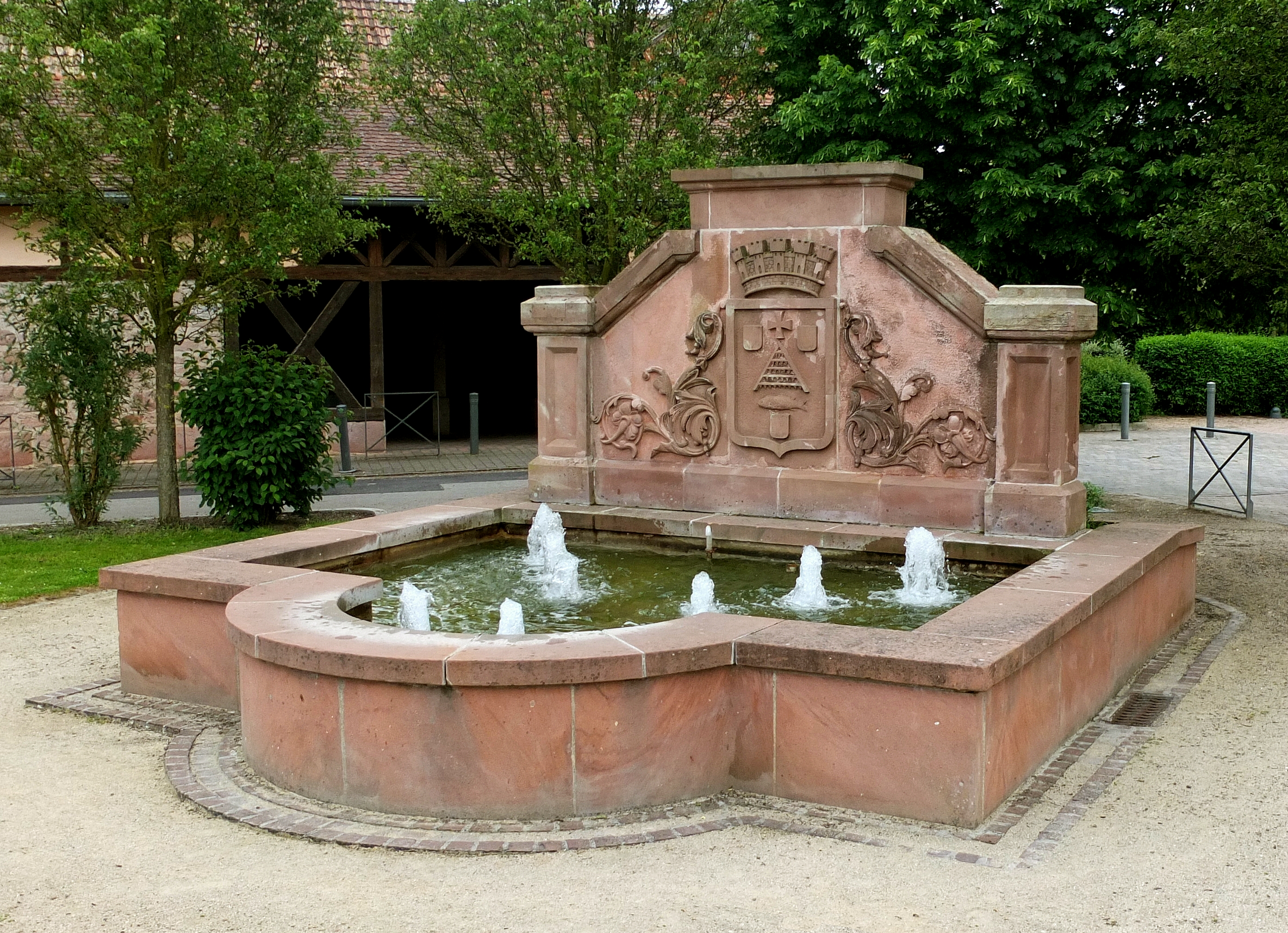
Fountain

Guémar (French pronunciation: [ɡemaʁ]; German: Gemar) is a commune in the Haut-Rhin department in Grand Est in north-eastern France.

== See also ==
- Communes of the Haut-Rhin département
- Leo Jud
