= Rombach-le-Franc =

Commune in Grand Est, France

- Commune
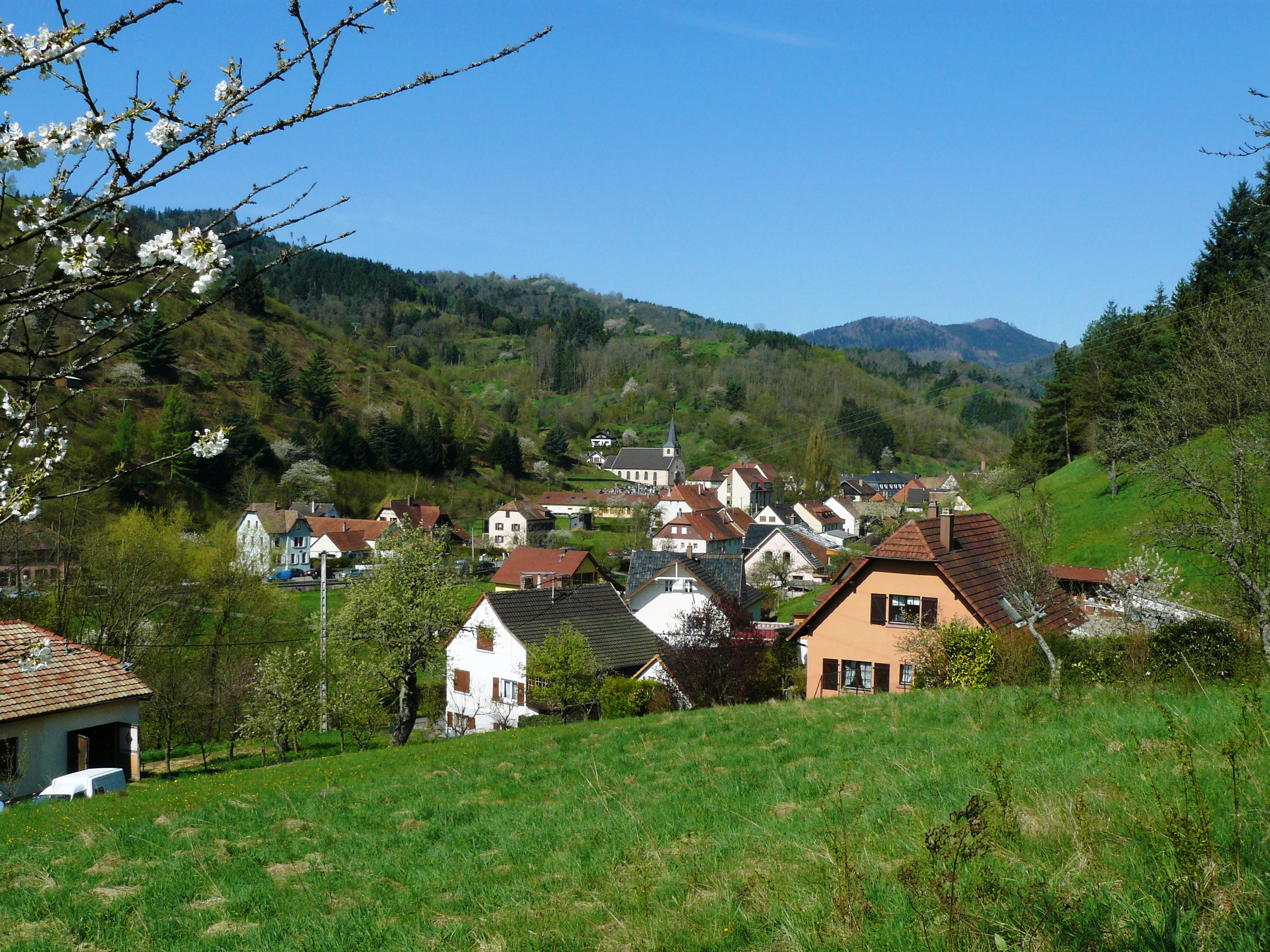
- Rombach-le-Franc seen from La Vaurière

- Coat of arms
- Location of Rombach-le-Franc
- Location within France Location within Grand Est
- Coordinates: 48°17′04″N 7°15′40″E
- Country: France
- Region: Grand Est
- Department: Haut-Rhin
- Arrondissement: Colmar-Ribeauvillé
- Canton: Sainte-Marie-aux-Mines
- Intercommunality: Val d'Argent

Government
  - Mayor (2020–2026): Jean-Luc Frechard
- Area^{1}: 17.87 km^{2} (6.90 sq mi)
- Elevation: 300 m (980 ft)
- Highest elevation: 850 m (2,790 ft)
- Lowest elevation: 290 m (950 ft)
- Population (2023): 775
  - Density: 43.4/km^{2} (112/sq mi)
- Time zone: UTC+01:00 (CET)
  - Summer (DST): UTC+02:00 (CEST)
- INSEE/Postal code: 68283 /68660
- ^{1} French Land Register data, which excludes lakes, ponds, glaciers > 1 km^{2} (0.386 sq mi or 247 acres) and river estuaries.

Rombach-le-Franc (French pronunciation: [ʁɔ̃ba lə fʁɑ̃]; German: Deutsch-Rumbach) is a commune in the Haut-Rhin department in Grand Est in north-eastern France.

== See also ==
- Communes of the Haut-Rhin department
