= Beblenheim =

Commune in Grand Est, France

- Commune
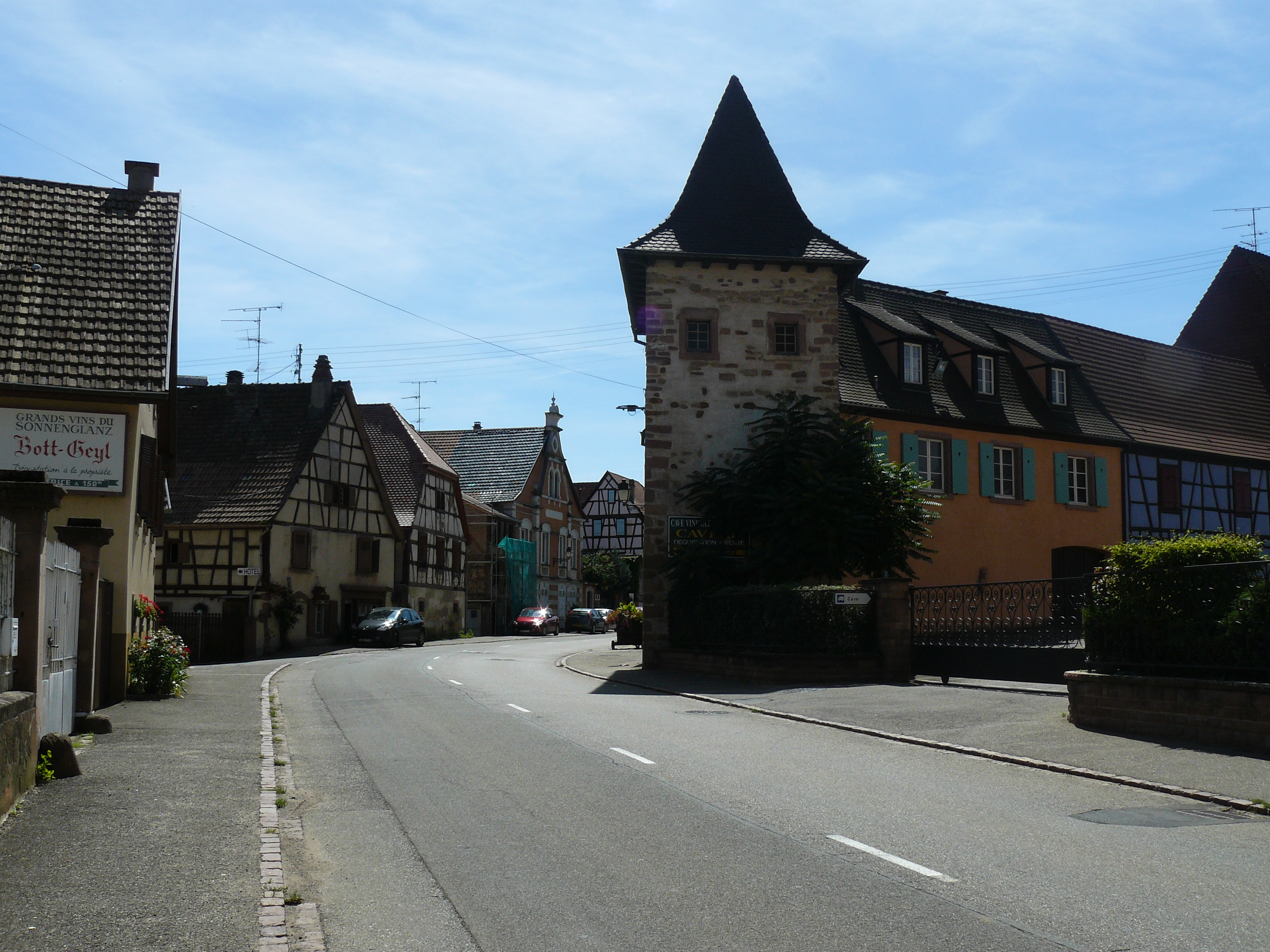
- The road into Beblenheim, from the east

- Coat of arms
- Location of Beblenheim
- Location within France Location within Grand Est
- Coordinates: 48°09′32″N 7°19′41″E
- Country: France
- Region: Grand Est
- Department: Haut-Rhin
- Arrondissement: Colmar-Ribeauvillé
- Canton: Sainte-Marie-aux-Mines
- Intercommunality: Pays de Ribeauvillé

Government
  - Mayor (2020–2026): Antoine Kleim
- Area^{1}: 5.61 km^{2} (2.17 sq mi)
- Highest elevation: 274 m (899 ft)
- Lowest elevation: 180 m (590 ft)
- Population (2023): 928
  - Density: 165/km^{2} (428/sq mi)
- Time zone: UTC+01:00 (CET)
  - Summer (DST): UTC+02:00 (CEST)
- INSEE/Postal code: 68023 /68980
- ^{1} French Land Register data, which excludes lakes, ponds, glaciers > 1 km^{2} (0.386 sq mi or 247 acres) and river estuaries.

Beblenheim (French pronunciation: [beblənaim]; German: Bebelnheim) is a commune in the Haut-Rhin department in Grand Est in north-eastern France.

== See also ==
- Communes of the Haut-Rhin department
