= Mittelwihr =

Commune in Grand Est, France

- Commune
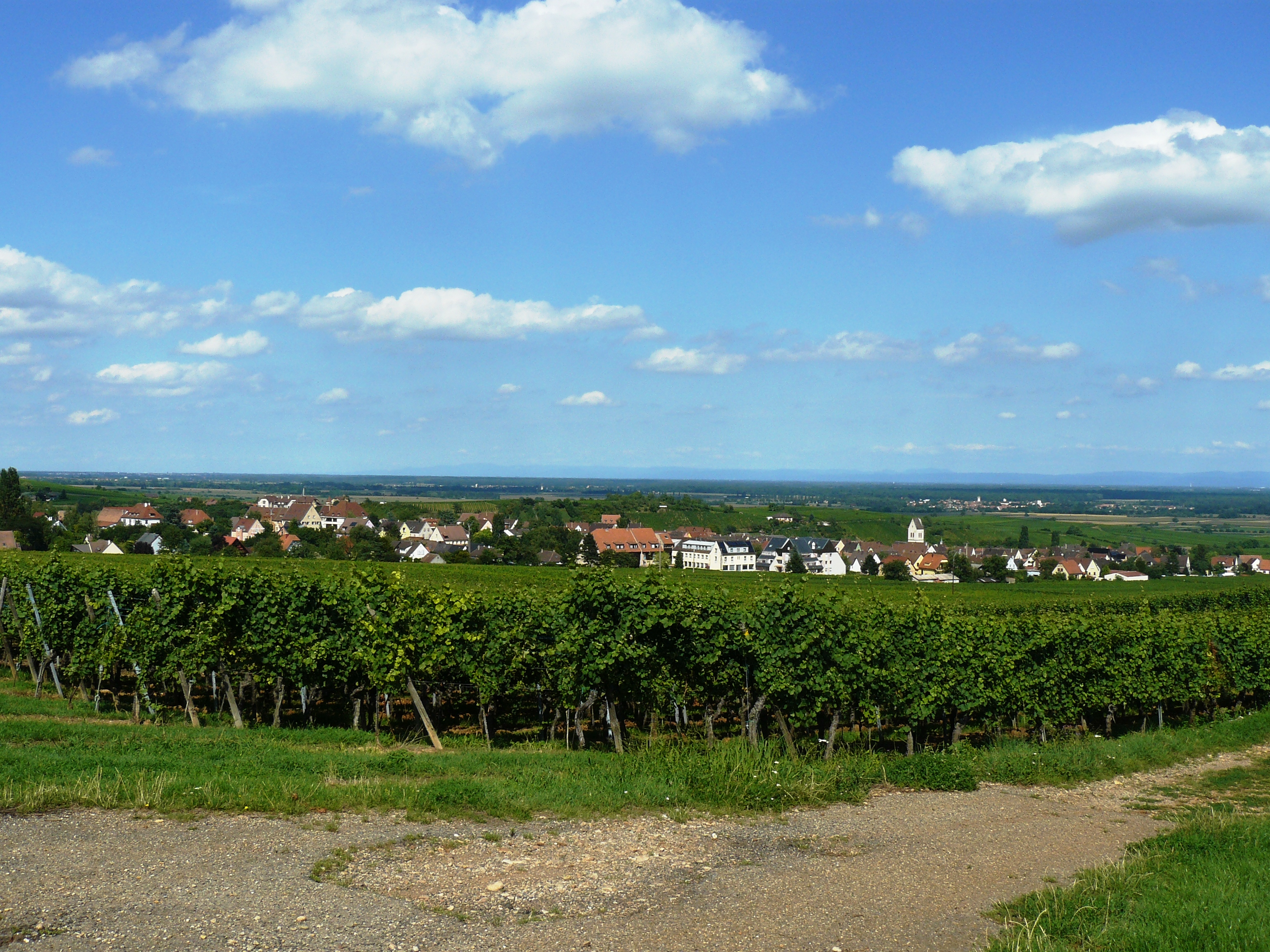
- A general view of Mittelwihr, from the vineyard

- Coat of arms
- Location of Mittelwihr
- Location within France Location within Grand Est
- Coordinates: 48°09′05″N 7°19′13″E
- Country: France
- Region: Grand Est
- Department: Haut-Rhin
- Arrondissement: Colmar-Ribeauvillé
- Canton: Sainte-Marie-aux-Mines
- Intercommunality: Pays de Ribeauvillé

Government
  - Mayor (2020–2026): Alain Kleindienst
- Area^{1}: 2.42 km^{2} (0.93 sq mi)
- Highest elevation: 403 m (1,322 ft)
- Lowest elevation: 196 m (643 ft)
- Population (2023): 853
  - Density: 352/km^{2} (913/sq mi)
- Time zone: UTC+01:00 (CET)
  - Summer (DST): UTC+02:00 (CEST)
- INSEE/Postal code: 68209 /68630
- ^{1} French Land Register data, which excludes lakes, ponds, glaciers > 1 km^{2} (0.386 sq mi or 247 acres) and river estuaries.

Mittelwihr (French pronunciation: [mitəlviʁ]; German: Mittelweier) is a commune in the Haut-Rhin department in Grand Est in north-eastern France.

== See also ==
- Communes of the Haut-Rhin département
