= Fréland =

Commune in Grand Est, France

- Commune
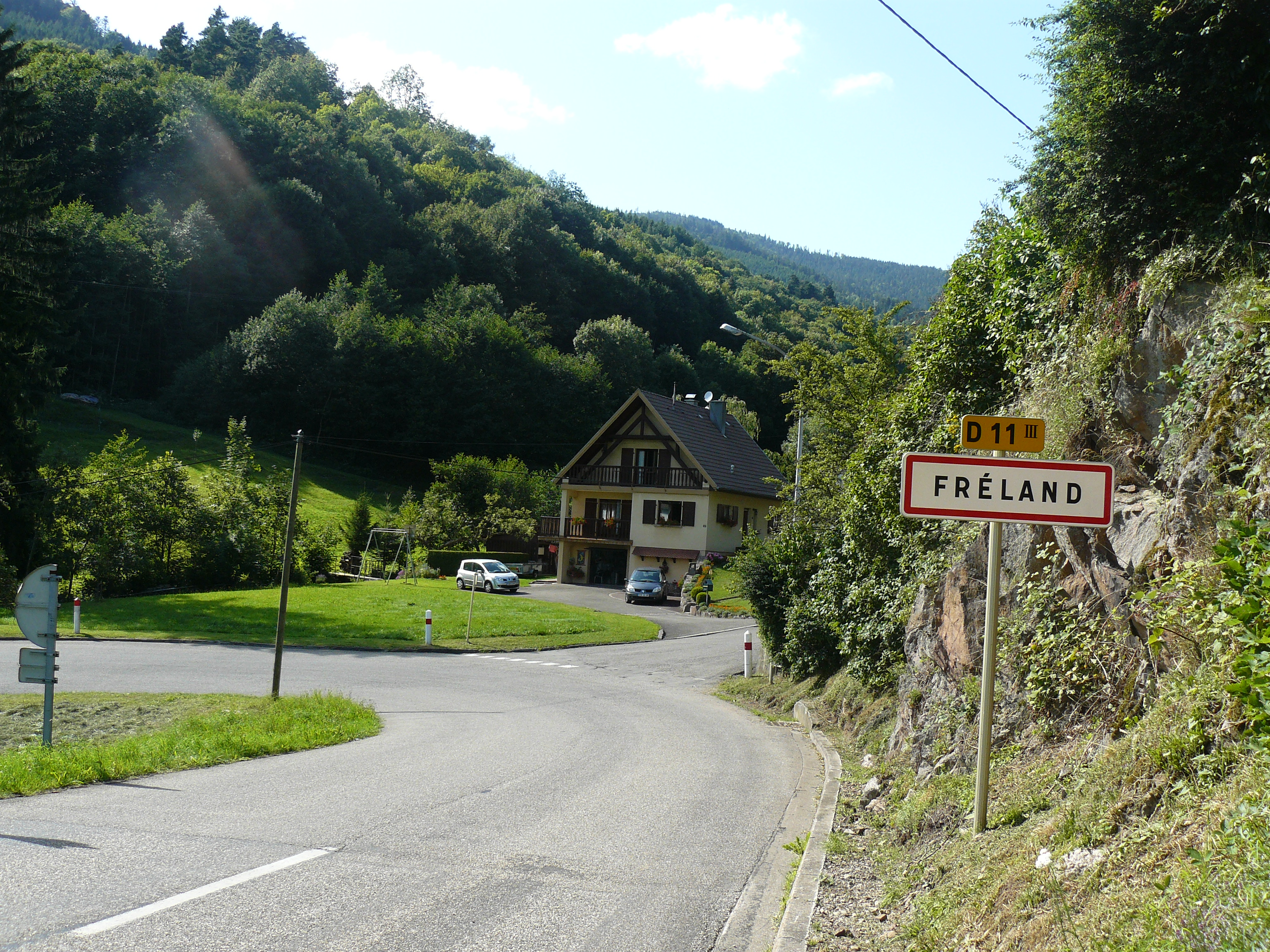
- The road into Fréland

- Coat of arms
- Location of Fréland
- Location within France Location within Grand Est
- Coordinates: 48°10′19″N 7°11′41″E
- Country: France
- Region: Grand Est
- Department: Haut-Rhin
- Arrondissement: Colmar-Ribeauvillé
- Canton: Sainte-Marie-aux-Mines
- Intercommunality: Vallée de Kaysersberg

Government
  - Mayor (2020–2026): Jean-Louis Barlier
- Area^{1}: 19.74 km^{2} (7.62 sq mi)
- Elevation: 430 m (1,410 ft)
- Highest elevation: 1,221 m (4,006 ft)
- Lowest elevation: 327 m (1,073 ft)
- Population (2023): 1,288
  - Density: 65.25/km^{2} (169.0/sq mi)
- Time zone: UTC+01:00 (CET)
  - Summer (DST): UTC+02:00 (CEST)
- INSEE/Postal code: 68097 /68240
- ^{1} French Land Register data, which excludes lakes, ponds, glaciers > 1 km^{2} (0.386 sq mi or 247 acres) and river estuaries.

Fréland (French pronunciation: [fʁelɑ̃]; German: Urbach bei Kaysersberg) is a commune in the Haut-Rhin department in Grand Est in north-eastern France.

== History ==
During the German occupation in World War II, in August 1944, eleven Polish prisoners of war escaped from a nearby German prisoner-of-war camp with the help of the local populace. The residents then provided shelter to the Poles for over three months until the settlement was liberated by the American army on December 6, 1944.

== See also ==
- Communes of the Haut-Rhin département
