= Ostheim, Haut-Rhin =

Commune in Grand Est, France

Ostheim
- Commune
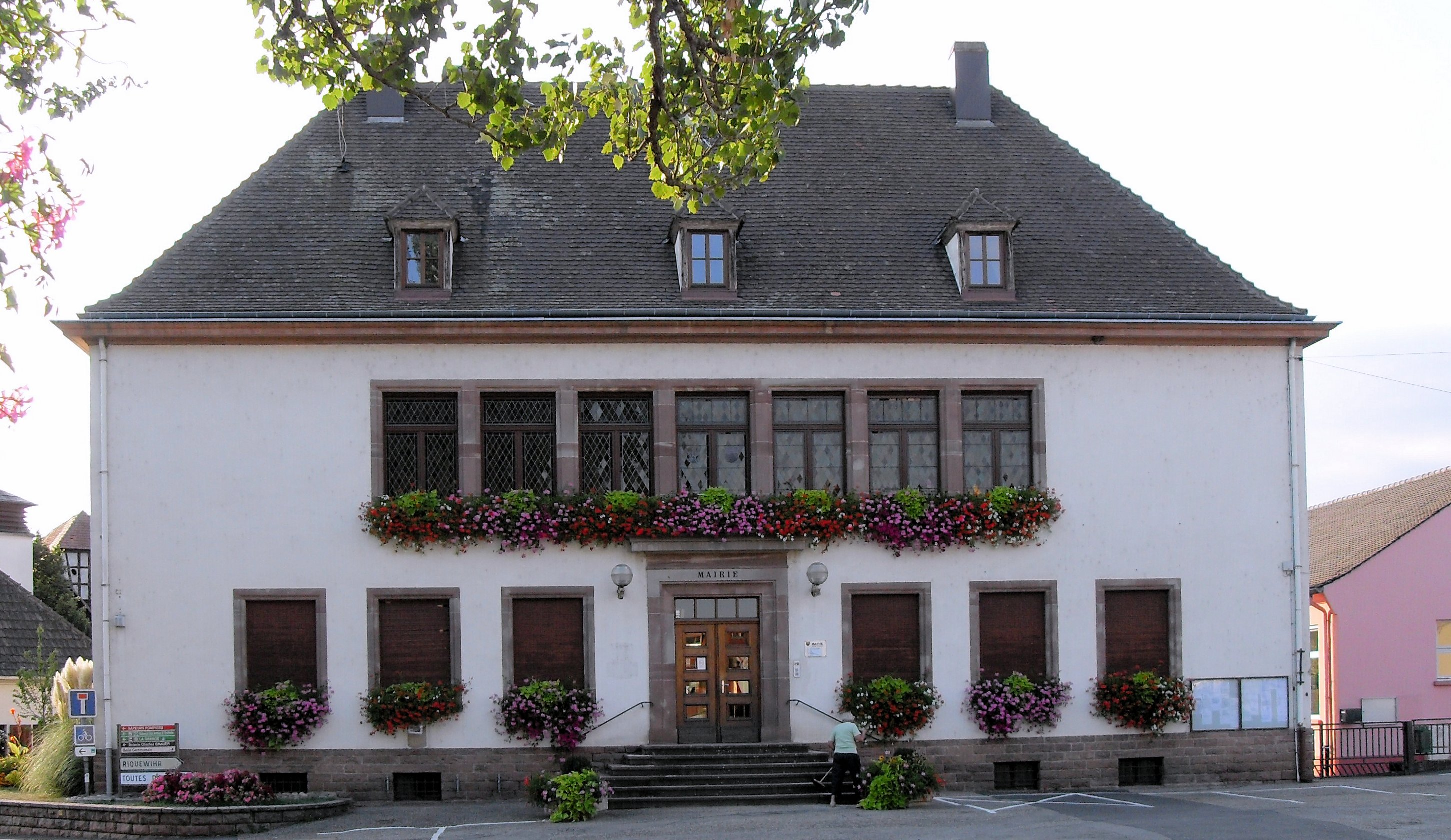
- The town hall in Ostheim

- Coat of arms
- Location of Ostheim
- Location within France Location within Grand Est
- Coordinates: 48°09′39″N 7°22′17″E
- Country: France
- Region: Grand Est
- Department: Haut-Rhin
- Arrondissement: Colmar-Ribeauvillé
- Canton: Sainte-Marie-aux-Mines
- Intercommunality: Pays de Ribeauvillé

Government
  - Mayor (2020–2026): Bernard Kempf
- Area^{1}: 8.16 km^{2} (3.15 sq mi)
- Highest elevation: 186 m (610 ft)
- Lowest elevation: 178 m (584 ft)
- Population (2023): 1,651
  - Density: 202/km^{2} (524/sq mi)
- Time zone: UTC+01:00 (CET)
  - Summer (DST): UTC+02:00 (CEST)
- INSEE/Postal code: 68252 /68150
- ^{1} French Land Register data, which excludes lakes, ponds, glaciers > 1 km^{2} (0.386 sq mi or 247 acres) and river estuaries.

Ostheim (French pronunciation: [ɔstaim]) is a commune in the Haut-Rhin department in Grand Est in north-eastern France.

== See also ==
- Communes of the Haut-Rhin department
