= Thannenkirch =

Commune in Grand Est, France

- Commune
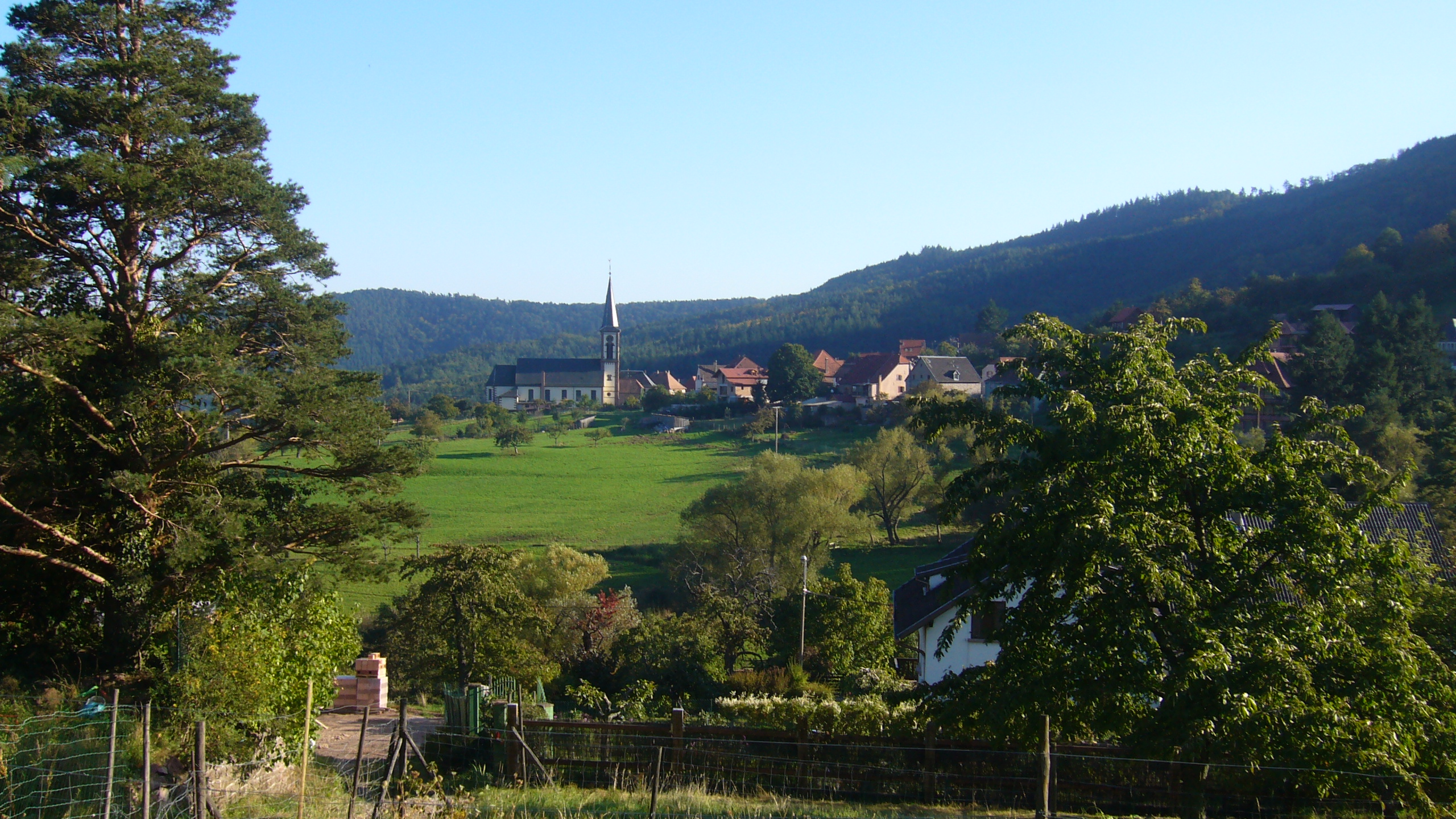
- A general view of Thannenkirch

- Coat of arms
- Location of Thannenkirch
- Location within France Location within Grand Est
- Coordinates: 48°14′00″N 7°18′16″E
- Country: France
- Region: Grand Est
- Department: Haut-Rhin
- Arrondissement: Colmar-Ribeauvillé
- Canton: Sainte-Marie-aux-Mines
- Intercommunality: Pays de Ribeauvillé

Government
  - Mayor (2020–2026): Angélique Dieuaide
- Area^{1}: 4.6 km^{2} (1.8 sq mi)
- Highest elevation: 938 m (3,077 ft)
- Lowest elevation: 386 m (1,266 ft)
- Population (2023): 451
  - Density: 98/km^{2} (250/sq mi)
- Time zone: UTC+01:00 (CET)
  - Summer (DST): UTC+02:00 (CEST)
- INSEE/Postal code: 68335 /68590
- ^{1} French Land Register data, which excludes lakes, ponds, glaciers > 1 km^{2} (0.386 sq mi or 247 acres) and river estuaries.

Thannenkirch (French pronunciation: [tanənkiʁʃ]) is a commune and tourist destination in the northeastern French department of Haut-Rhin.

== Geography ==
The village is located in the foothills of the Taennchel Massif at an elevation of 468m. It is about 65 km southwest of Strasbourg, 20 km north of Colmar, and 5 km southwest of the château du Haut-Koenigsbourg.

== See also ==
- Communes of the Haut-Rhin department
