= Rodern =

Commune in Grand Est, France

- Commune
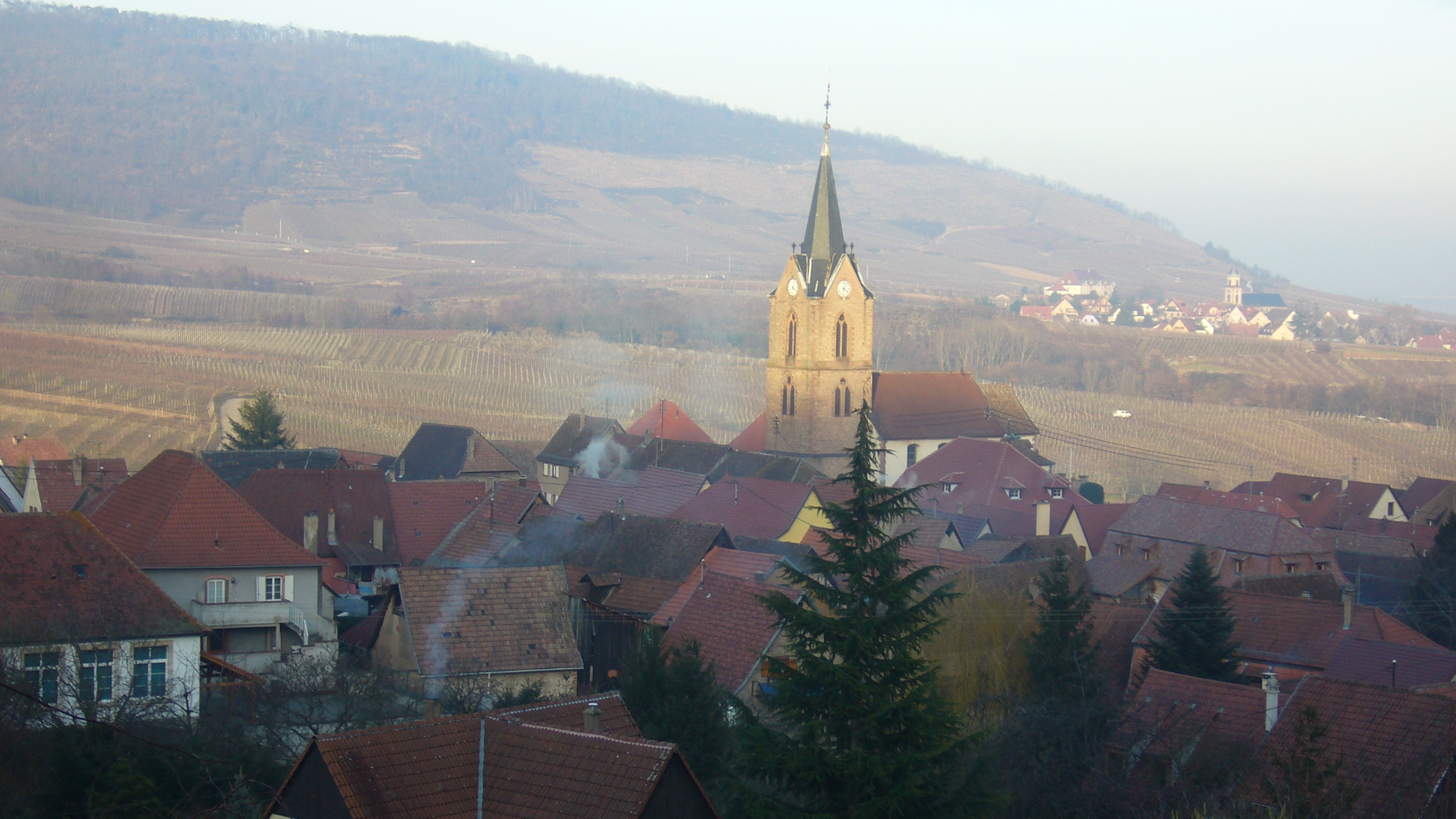
- View of Rodern

- Coat of arms
- Location of Rodern
- Location within France Location within Grand Est
- Coordinates: 48°13′32″N 7°21′16″E
- Country: France
- Region: Grand Est
- Department: Haut-Rhin
- Arrondissement: Colmar-Ribeauvillé
- Canton: Sainte-Marie-aux-Mines
- Intercommunality: Pays de Ribeauvillé

Government
  - Mayor (2020–2026): Robert Sprolewitz
- Area^{1}: 7.05 km^{2} (2.72 sq mi)
- Highest elevation: 760 m (2,490 ft)
- Lowest elevation: 228 m (748 ft)
- Population (2023): 401
  - Density: 56.9/km^{2} (147/sq mi)
- Time zone: UTC+01:00 (CET)
  - Summer (DST): UTC+02:00 (CEST)
- INSEE/Postal code: 68280 /68590
- ^{1} French Land Register data, which excludes lakes, ponds, glaciers > 1 km^{2} (0.386 sq mi or 247 acres) and river estuaries.

Rodern (French pronunciation: [ʁodɛʁn]) is a commune in the Haut-Rhin department in Grand Est in north-eastern France.

== See also ==
- Communes of the Haut-Rhin department
