= Rorschwihr =

Commune in Grand Est, France

- Commune
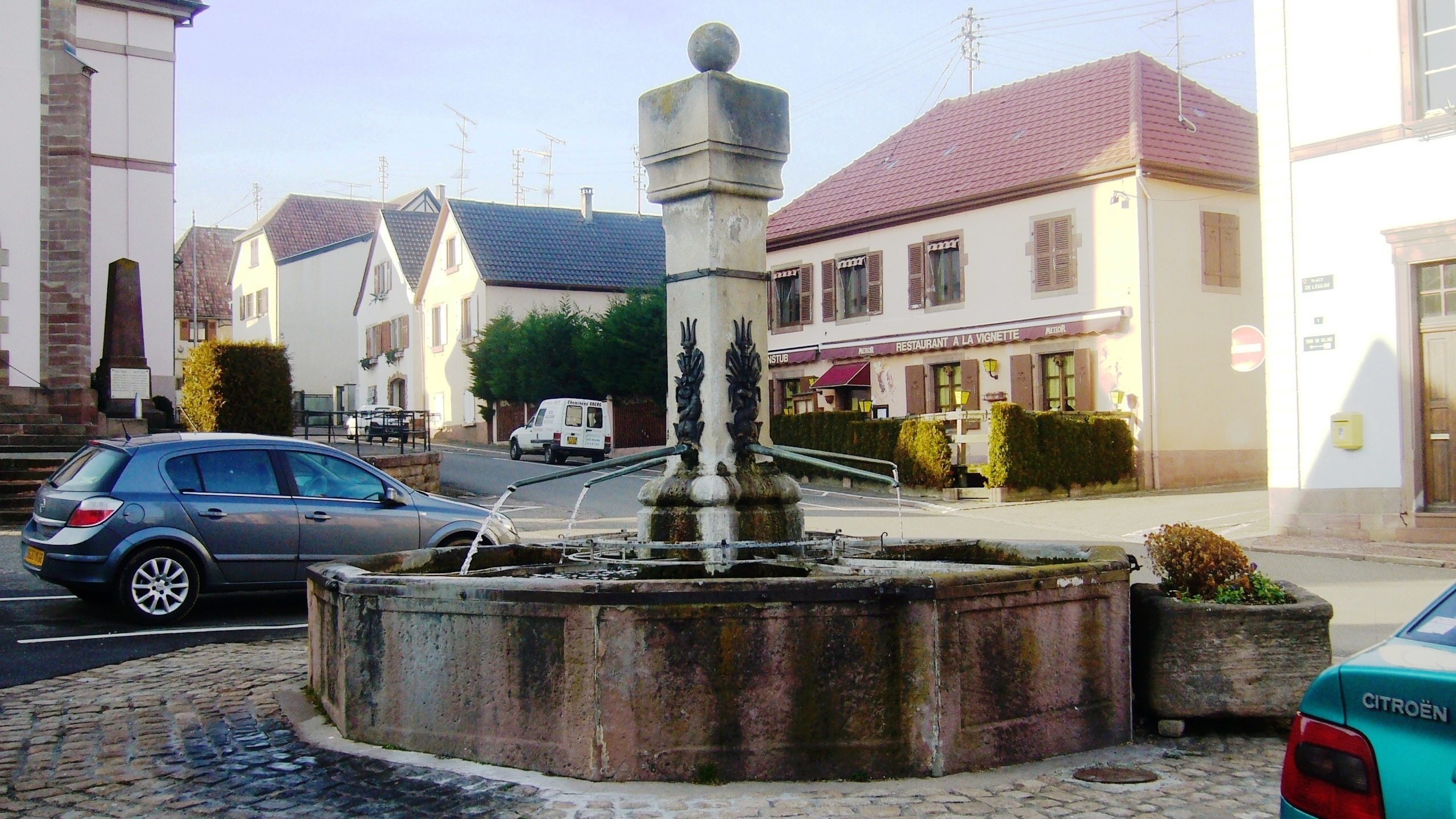

- Coat of arms
- Location of Rorschwihr
- Location within France Location within Grand Est
- Coordinates: 48°13′05″N 7°21′49″E
- Country: France
- Region: Grand Est
- Department: Haut-Rhin
- Arrondissement: Colmar-Ribeauvillé
- Canton: Sainte-Marie-aux-Mines
- Intercommunality: Pays de Ribeauvillé

Government
  - Mayor (2020–2026): Denise Rieg
- Area^{1}: 2.47 km^{2} (0.95 sq mi)
- Highest elevation: 362 m (1,188 ft)
- Lowest elevation: 190 m (620 ft)
- Population (2023): 370
  - Density: 150/km^{2} (390/sq mi)
- Time zone: UTC+01:00 (CET)
  - Summer (DST): UTC+02:00 (CEST)
- INSEE/Postal code: 68285 /68590
- ^{1} French Land Register data, which excludes lakes, ponds, glaciers > 1 km^{2} (0.386 sq mi or 247 acres) and river estuaries.

Rorschwihr (French pronunciation: [ʁɔʁʃviʁ]; German: Rorschweier) is a commune in the Haut-Rhin department in Grand Est in north-eastern France. It is part of the Alsace wine route.

== See also ==
- Communes of the Haut-Rhin department
