= Drei-Ähren Railway =

Railway line in France

Coordinates: 48.09936°N 7.23289°E

Electric Tramway from Türkheim to Drei-Ähren
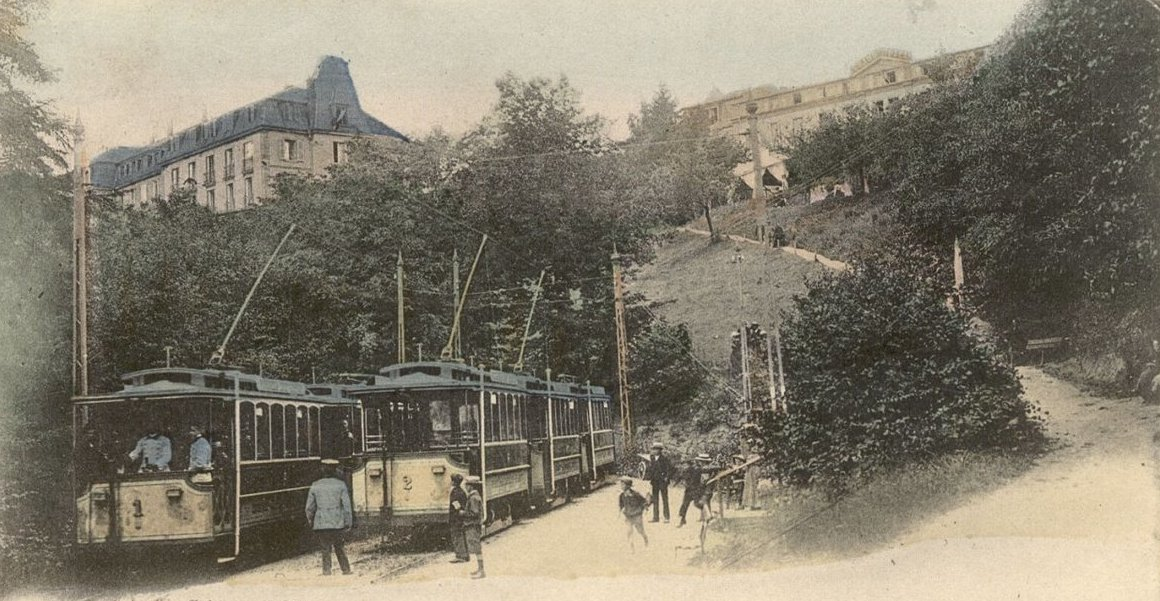
- Electric Tramway Türkheim – Drei Ähren

Technical
- Line length: 8.7 km (5.4 mi)
- Track gauge: 1,000 mm (3 ft 3 3/8 in)
Route map
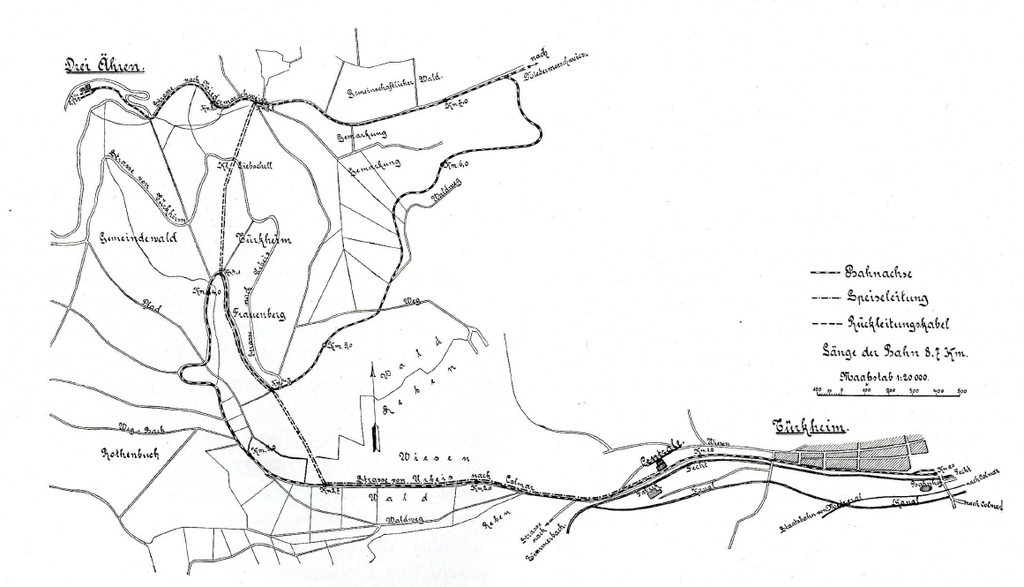
Historic map, ca 1900

The Drei-Ähren Railway (German for Three Ears of Corn Railway, French Voie Ferrée Trois Épis) consisted of the 1,000 mm (3 ft 3 3/8 in) track gauge Electric Tramway from Türkheim to Drei-Ähren and the 600 mm (1 ft 11 5/8 in) track gauge Military Light Railway from Drei-Ähren to Uhlhorst at Drei-Ähren near Colmar in Alsace.

== Electric Tramway from Türkheim to Drei-Ähren ==
=== History ===
From 5 June 1899, the Electric Tramway from Türkheim to Drei-Ähren connected the small town of Türkheim, located 6 km (4 mi) west of Colmar, with the pilgrimage church at Drei Ähren (French Trois Épis). The construction of the railway went back to an initiative of the electricity company Schuckert & Co. from Nuremberg, while the Alsace was an Imperial Territory of Germany.

At times there were plans to extend the route from Türkheim to Winzenheim and thereby connect it to Colmar's secondary railway and tram network. The plans were, however, not implemented. After an interruption of operations in the First World War since 1919 under the name Société d’Electricité de Turckheim et Tramways de Turckheim aux Trois Epis (TTE), the railway was shut down on 1 April 1937.

=== Route ===
Drei-Ähren (now Trois Épis) lays good 400 meters higher than Türkheim, which gave the railway the character of a mountain railway - albeit without cogwheel operation. It had a total length of 8.7 km (5.4 mi) and the maximum gradient was 1 in 10.2 (9.8%).

The electrical plant for the power supply was 1.2 km (0.75 mi) of the terminus and had a siding which branched off into four tracks to coal bunker, a repair shop and the car shed with 2 stands for 3 cars each.

=== Operation ===
In addition to a freight car and a baggage car, seven tram cars were available for operation. The average speed was 12.5 kilometres per hour (7.8 mph) on the ascent and 11 kilometres per hour (6.8 mph) on the descent. The lower sixth of the railway line could be driven uphill at 18 kilometres per hour (11 mph).

== Military Light Railway from Drei-Ähren to Uhlhorst ==
Military Light Railway from Drei-Ähren to Uhlhorst
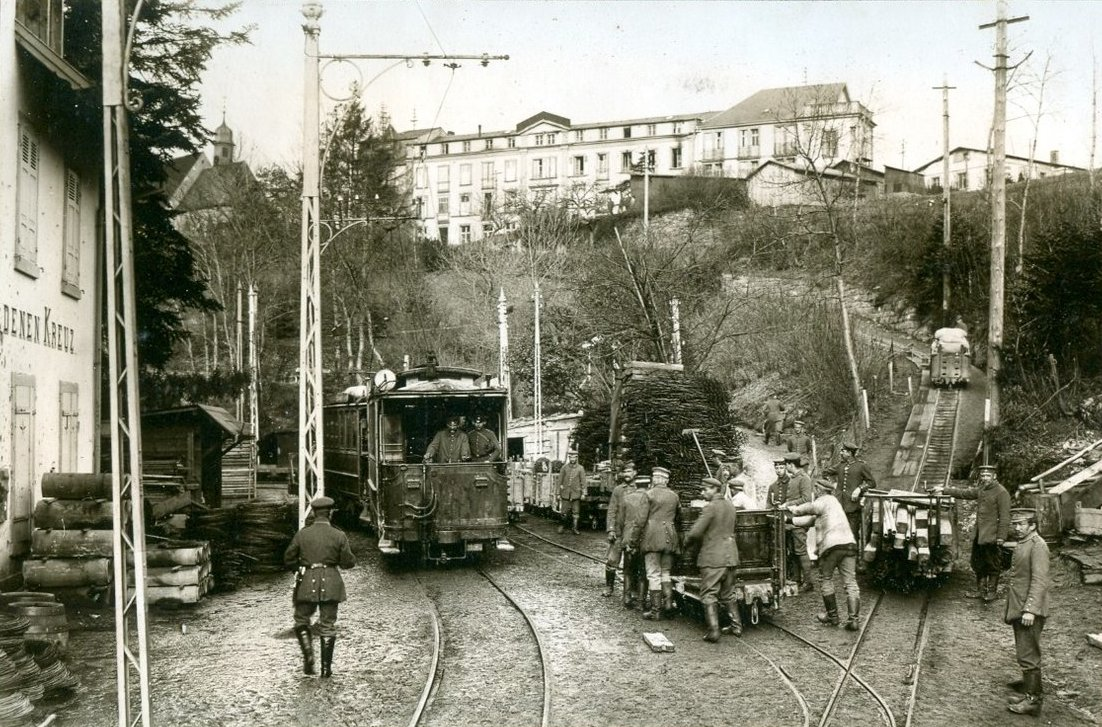
- Re-loading due to break of gauge from 1,000 mm (3 ft 3 3/8 in) to 600 mm (1 ft 11 5/8 in)

Technical
- Line length: 11.3 km (7.0 mi)
- Track gauge: 600 mm (1 ft 11 5/8 in)
Route map
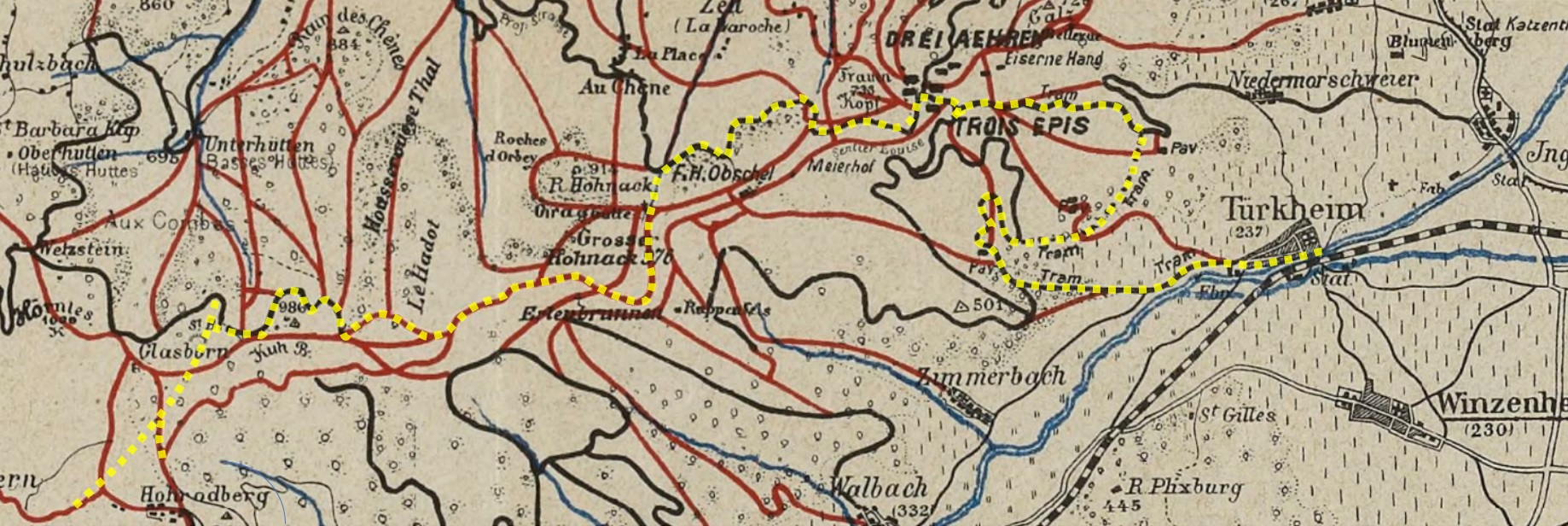
Route superimposed onto a historic hiking map

=== History ===
During the First World War, the military construction division R 22 laid a 11.3 km (7.0 mi) long military light railway with a track gauge of 600 mm (1 ft 11 5/8 in) to Uhlhorst station, around the front line at Lingekopf, Kleinkopf, Barrenkopf and Hartmannsweilerkopf west of Drei-Ähren. Its objective was to transport building materials for the bunkers, barbed wire, weapons, ammunition and supplied to the front line and on the way back bring wounded soldiers to the hospitals. Thousands of French and German soldiers were killed in the battles along this railway line.

On 31 December 1917, the Bavarian FeBA 24 (Feldbahnamt, Light Railway Office) took over the line and operated it until May 1918. After that, FeBA 50 took over the line until the end of the war.

=== Route ===
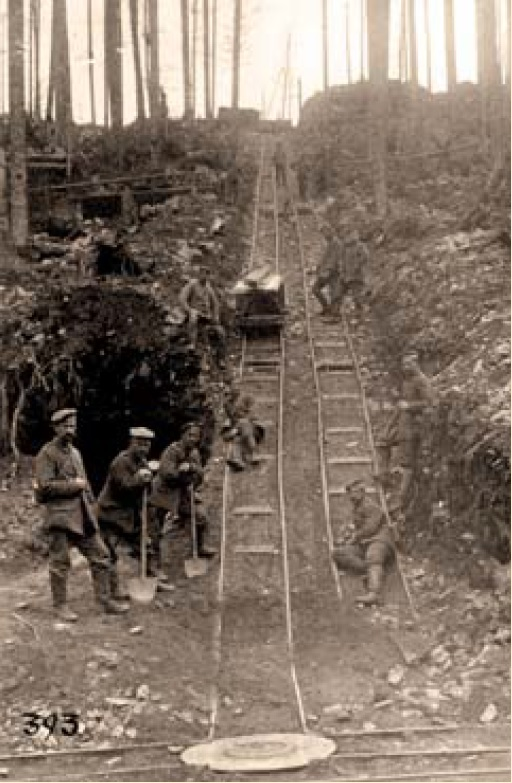
Incline at Barrenkopf

At the upper terminus of the electric tramway, the goods were reloaded onto the narrow-gauge waggons on the light railway line. These could be hauled upwards on a winch-operated single-track incline car to the military light railway station on the square in front of the pilgrimage church in Drei-Ähren.

At the Bärenstall (literally Bear Cage) station, a branch line turned north to the Lingekopf. The main line continued via Schratzmännle, Barrenkopf and Kleinkopf to the Uhlhorst terminus north of Hohrodberg.

There was a double-track incline between Barrenkopf and Kleinkopf, which overcame a height difference of 50 m (160 ft) on a 100 m (330 ft)long piece of the route. The conveyor track has been decommissioned in the postwar period and lifted by French troops.

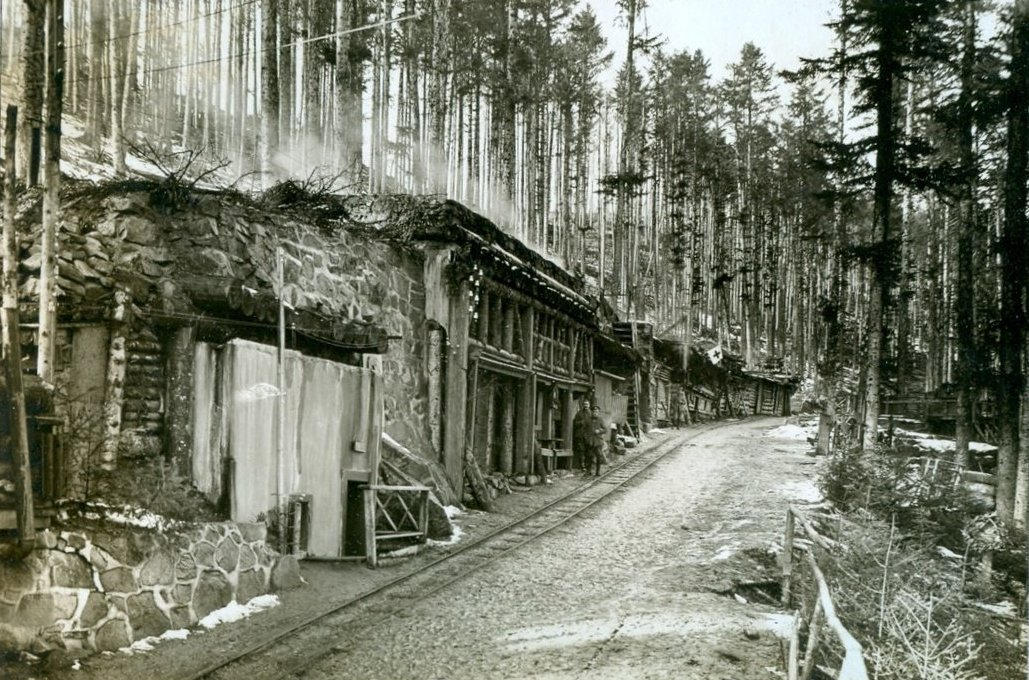
At the Barrenkopf

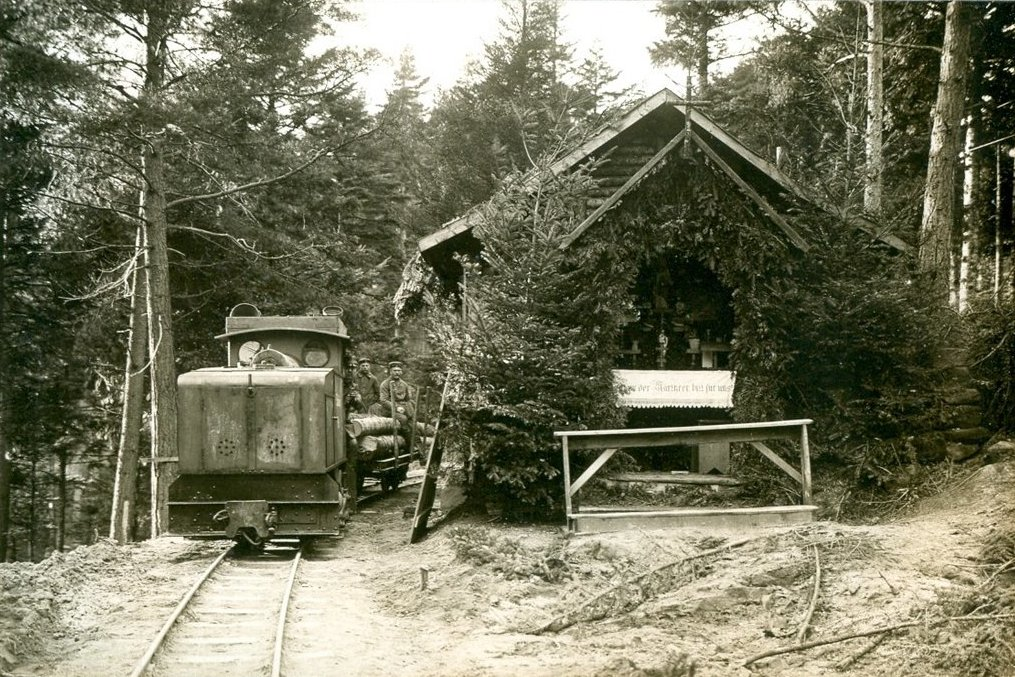
Benzene loco at Erlenbrunn barracks

=== Operation ===
The military light railway line was operated as a horse-drawn railway or with a benzene locomotive. The journey time was about 1½ hours.
