= Battle of Turckheim =

1675 battle of the Franco-Dutch War

- Part of Franco-Dutch War
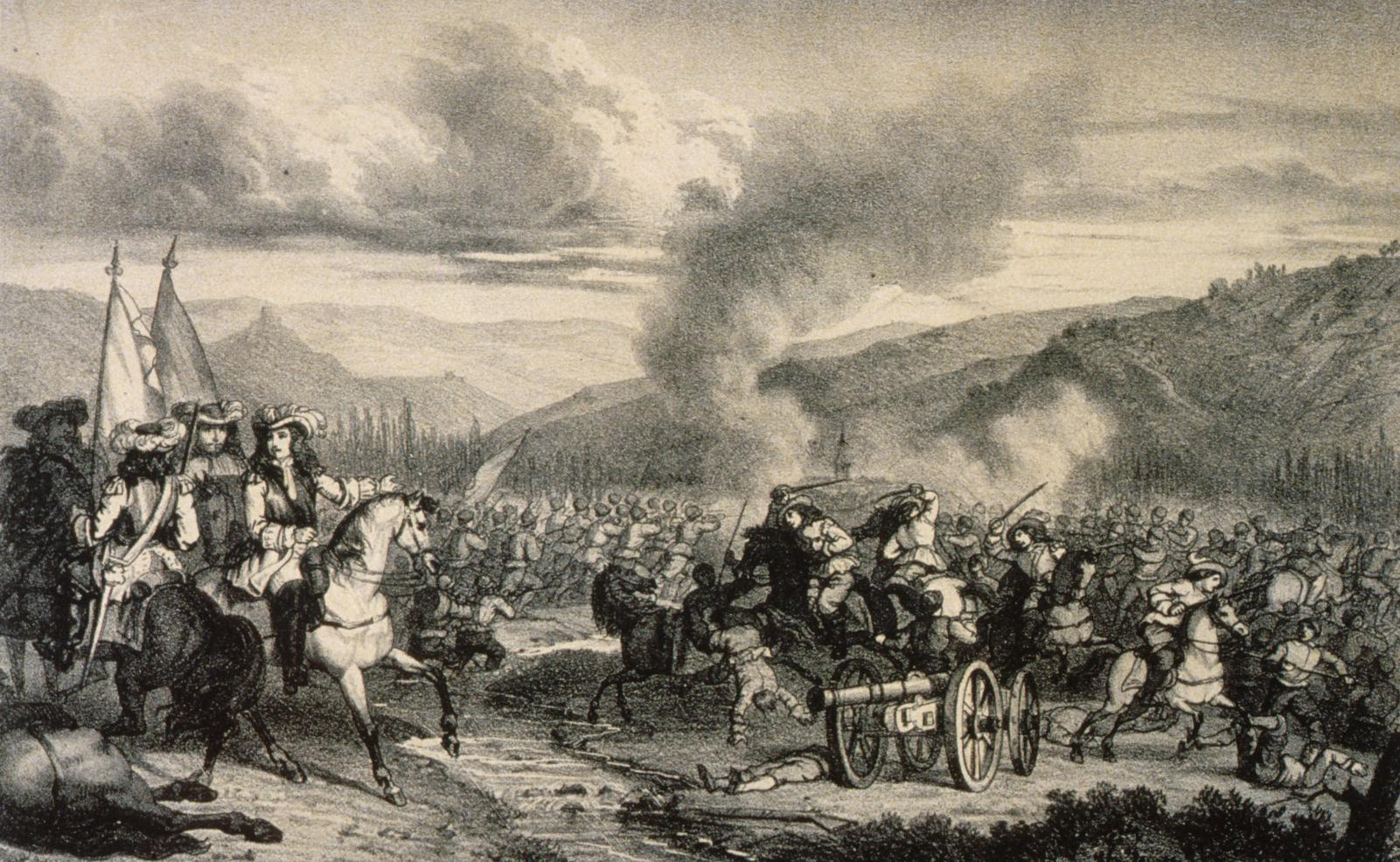
- Battle of Turckheim by Emile Lemaitre
Date	5 January 1675
Location	Turckheim (now in Alsace, France) 48°5′9″N 7°16′12″E
Result	French victory

Belligerents
France	Holy Roman Empire; Margraviate of Brandenburg

Commanders and leaders
(Kingdom of France) Vicomte of Turenne	(Holy Roman Empire) Alexander von Bournonville (Margraviate of Brandenburg) Frederick William, Elector of Brandenburg

Strength
30,000	30,000–50,000

Casualties and losses
1,100	3,400; 900 killed or wounded, 2,500 captured

The Battle of Turckheim took place on 5 January 1675 during the Franco-Dutch War at a site between the towns of Colmar and Turckheim in Alsace. The French army, commanded by the Viscount of Turenne, defeated the armies of Austria and Brandenburg, led by Alexander von Bournonville and Frederick William, Elector of Brandenburg.

== Prelude ==
The aggressive campaign of Louis XIV against the Netherlands, since 1672, had provoked a hostile reaction of other European states like Austria (who controlled the Holy Roman Empire) and Brandenburg. Their intervention had brought the war into the upper Rhine, creating a threat to French territory. In 1674 Marshal Turenne, French commander in that sector, failed to prevent the invasion of Alsace by a part of the Imperial Army. With the arrival of year's end in 1674, the Imperials went into their winter quarters in the region of Colmar, a few miles south of the French winter barracks, situated in Haguenau.

According to the conventions of war at the time, the military operations should have been halted during the winter until the return of the spring. Turenne, however, decided not to follow this custom. Using the Vosges mountains as protection, he moved west and then south, reappearing in Belfort, south of his opponent, on 27 December 1674. Finding no resistance, he reached Mulhouse on the 29th. The surprised Imperials hastily fell back on Turckheim.

== Battle ==
Turenne and his 30,000 troops found the Imperial Army well positioned with 30,000 to 50,000 men under the command of Frederick William, Elector of Brandenburg, on the afternoon of 5 January 1675. However, the Imperial forces had not yet gelled completely to be ready for battle. The ensuing battle did not follow the standards of the 17th century. Turenne feigned an attack from the center and then another from his right. With Imperial attention focused on these two parts of the front, Turenne led a third of his army on a march around to his left flank. This movement skirted the mountains and was hidden from view of the enemy because of the terrain. Turenne captured the small village of Turckheim. Frederick William attempted to retake the town, but he was defeated by heavy fire from French guns and an infantry charge. Turenne then fell on the extreme right of the enemy. The speed of the attack (which was not preceded by artillery fire) and the numerical superiority at this spot disrupted and demoralized the defenders, putting them to flight after suffering 3,400 casualties.

== Aftermath ==
With their winter quarters now threatened, Frederick William's army was forced to leave Alsace, leaving at Colmar three thousand men sick or wounded, and sought the safety of Strasbourg where the army in the following week crossed the Rhine River, back onto the right bank into present-day Germany.

This brief winter campaign by Marshal Turenne is considered one of the brightest of the 17th century. Through two indirect maneuvers (one strategic and one tactical), he had saved France from an invasion, suffering only small casualties.
