= Victor Sieg =

French composer and organist (1837–1899)

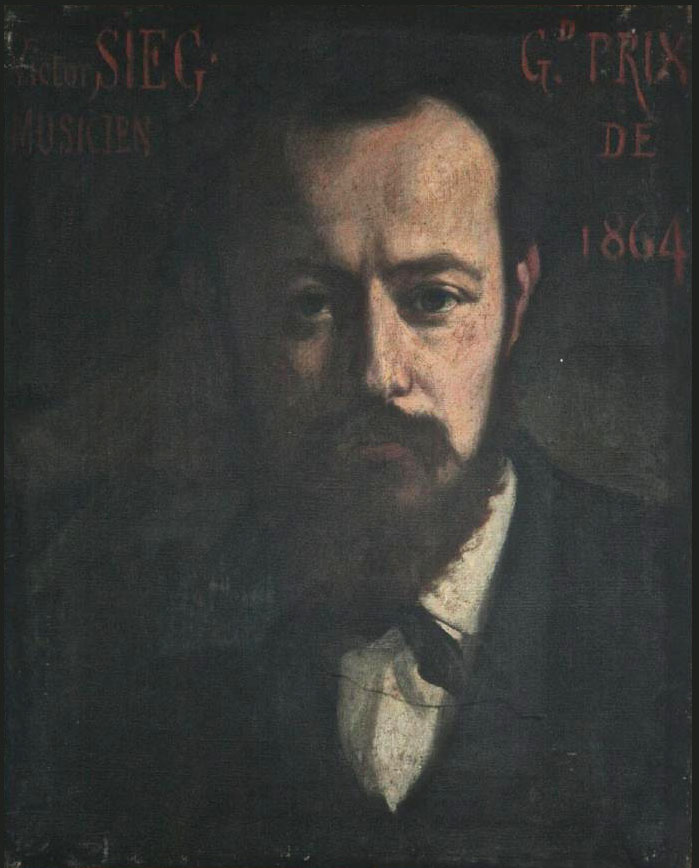
- 1864 portrait of Sieg
- Born: Charles-Victor Sieg; 8 August 1837; Turckheim, France
- Died: 6 April 1899 (aged 61); Colmar, France
- Occupations: composer; organist

Charles-Victor Sieg (8 August 1837 – 6 April 1899) was a French composer and organist. He won the 1864 Prix de Rome for his setting of the dramatic cantata, Ivanhoé.

== Life and career ==
Sieg was born on 8 August 1839, in Turckheim. His father, Constant Sieg (1807 – 1891), was a composer and the organist of the Church of Saint-Martin in Colmar. Sieg studied first under his father and then at the Conservatoire de Paris under François Benoist (organ) and Ambroise Thomas (composition). He won the conservatory's First Prize in organ in 1863, and the following year he won the Prix de Rome for the cantata, Ivanhoé set to a French text by Victor Roussy based on Walter Scott's 1820 novel, Ivanhoe. (Note: For the final round of Prix de Rome, the competitors were all required to set the same text as a cantata. The competitors hired their own singers for the performances before the jury.) The cantata premiered on 18 November 1864 at the Paris Opera with Jean Morère in the title role and was well received.

Ivanhoé proved to be Sieg's only major composition, although he later published several piano pieces including Trois Impromptus, Tarentelle and Caprice-Valse. After he returned from Rome where he had worked on composing an opéra-comique, he took up a post in Paris as organist at the church of Notre-Dame de Clignancourt and devoted himself to teaching. He also served as the organist of the Church of Saint-Merri and as the singing inspector for Paris city schools. Sieg died in Colmar on 6 April 1899, aged 61. Rue Victor Sieg, a street in Turckheim, is named in his honour.
