= Couladère =

- Commune
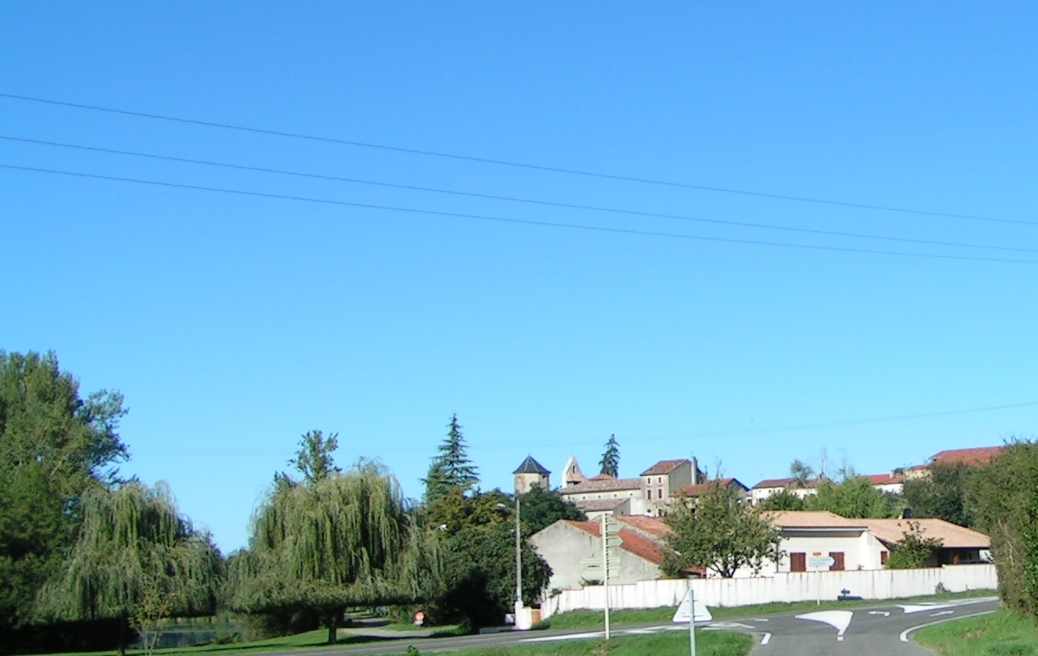
- A general view of Couladère
- Location of Couladère
- Location within France Location within Occitanie
- Coordinates: 43°12′10″N 1°05′29″E
- Country: France
- Region: Occitania
- Department: Haute-Garonne
- Arrondissement: Muret
- Canton: Cazères

Government
  - Mayor (2020–2026): Jocelin Wiederhold
- Area^{1}: 2.18 km^{2} (0.84 sq mi)
- Elevation: 245 m (804 ft)
- Highest elevation: 306 m (1,004 ft)
- Lowest elevation: 225 m (738 ft)
- Population (2023): 415
  - Density: 190/km^{2} (493/sq mi)
- Time zone: UTC+01:00 (CET)
  - Summer (DST): UTC+02:00 (CEST)
- INSEE/Postal code: 31153 /31220
- ^{1} French Land Register data, which excludes lakes, ponds, glaciers > 1 km^{2} (0.386 sq mi or 247 acres) and river estuaries.

Couladère (French pronunciation: [kuladɛʁ]; Occitan: Coladèra) is a commune in the Haute-Garonne department in southwestern France.

== Personalities ==
- The opera singer Jean Morère was born in Couladère in 1836.

== Population ==
Historical population
Year	Pop.	±% p.a.
1968	271	—
1975	286	+0.77%
1982	305	+0.92%
1990	330	+0.99%
1999	351	+0.69%
2007	427	+2.48%
2012	436	+0.42%
2017	425	−0.51%
2023	415	−0.40%
Source: INSEE

== See also ==
- Communes of the Haute-Garonne department
