= Romain Cazes =

French painter (1810–1881)

Romain Cazes (1810–1881) was a French historical painter.

== Life ==
Cazes was born at St. Béat (Haute-Garonne) in 1810. He was a pupil of Ingres, and is known chiefly by his portraits and subjects from sacred history. His paintings and murals decorate the Paris churches of St. Francois Xavier and Notre-Dame de Clignancourt, as well as churches in the provinces. Like all of the pupils of Ingres, except for Flandrin, he never rose above mediocrity, and died in 1881.

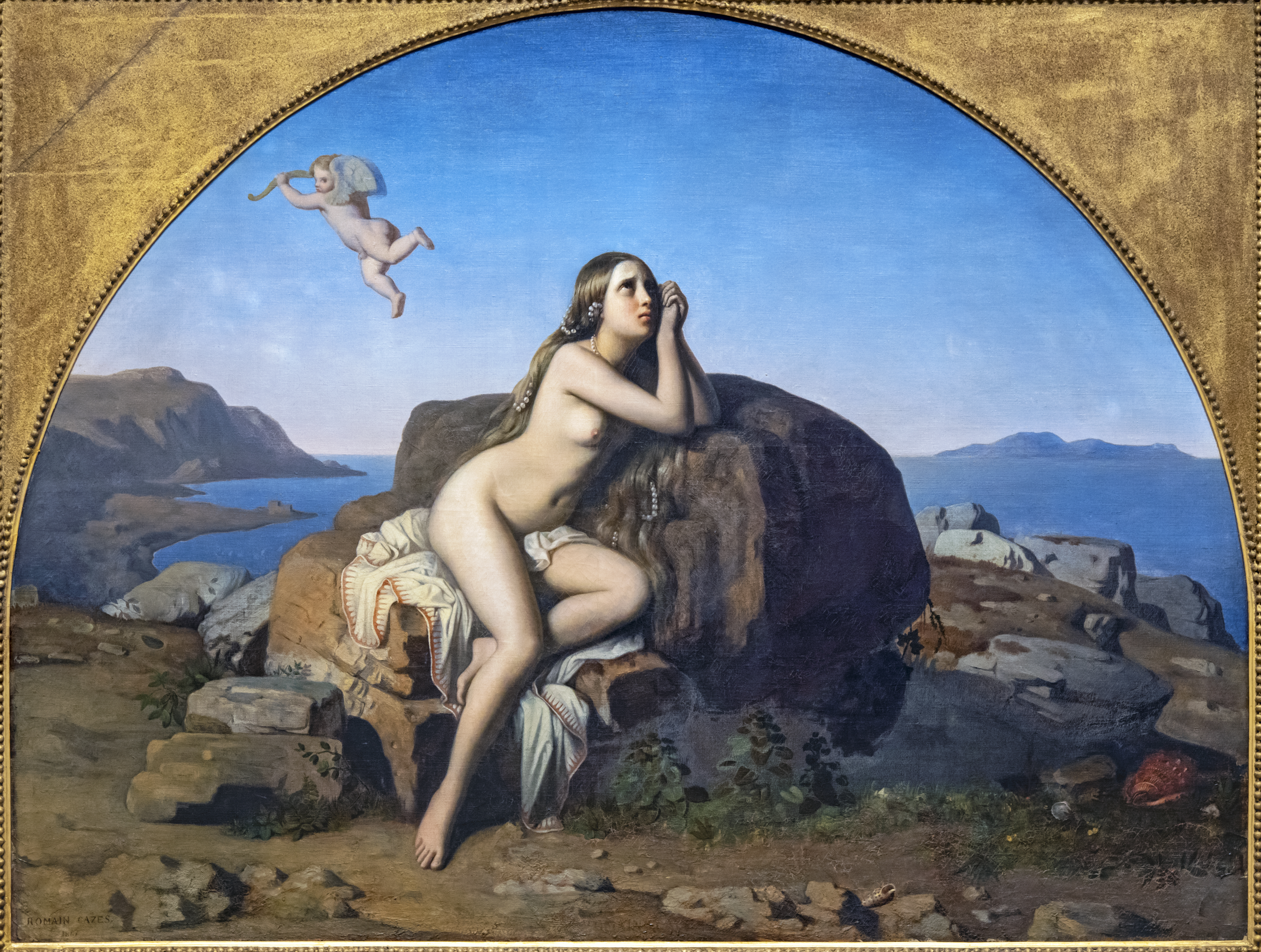
Ariadne abandoned Musée Ingres Montauban

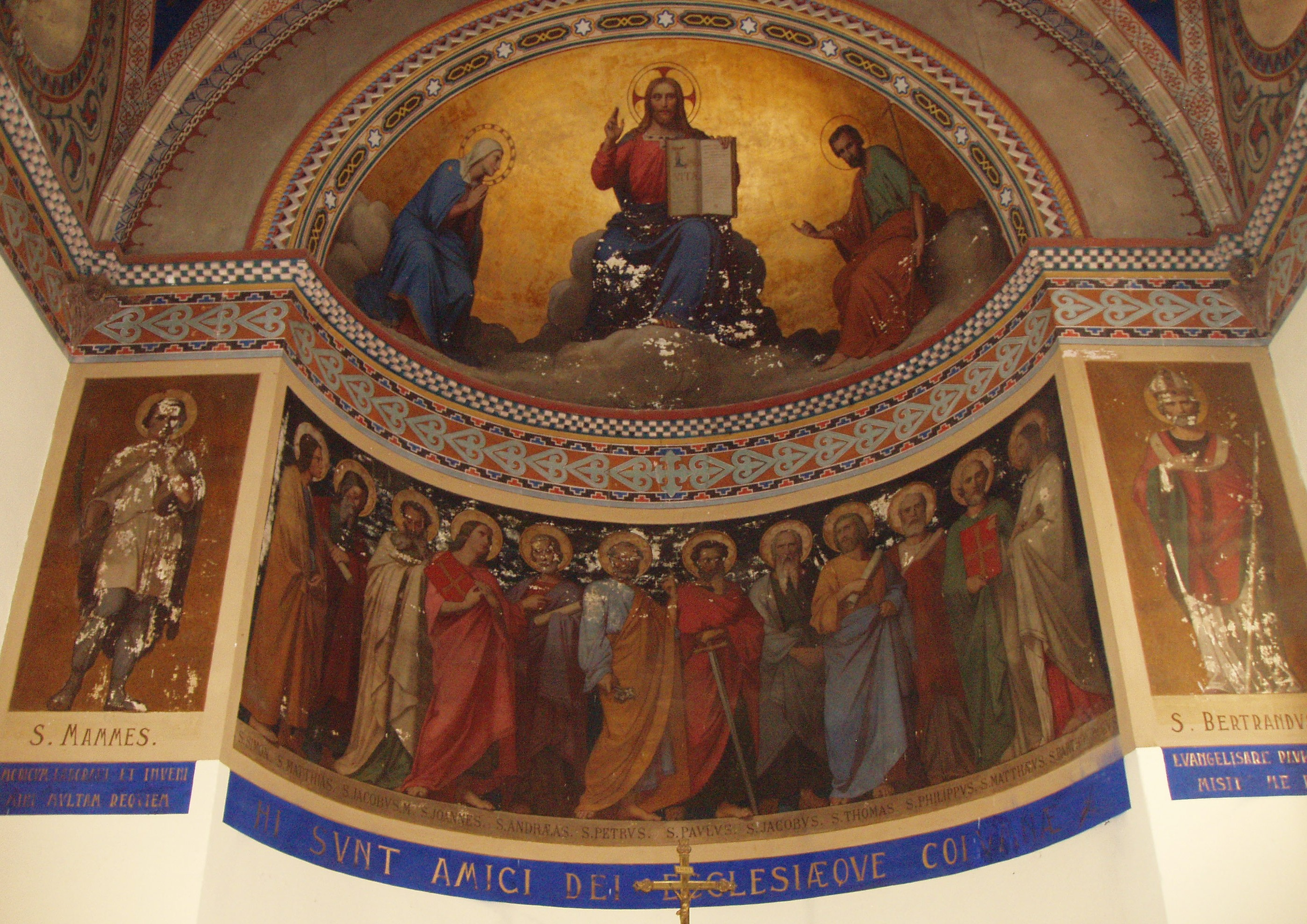
Frescoes in the church of Saint-Mamet, Haute Garonne, France.

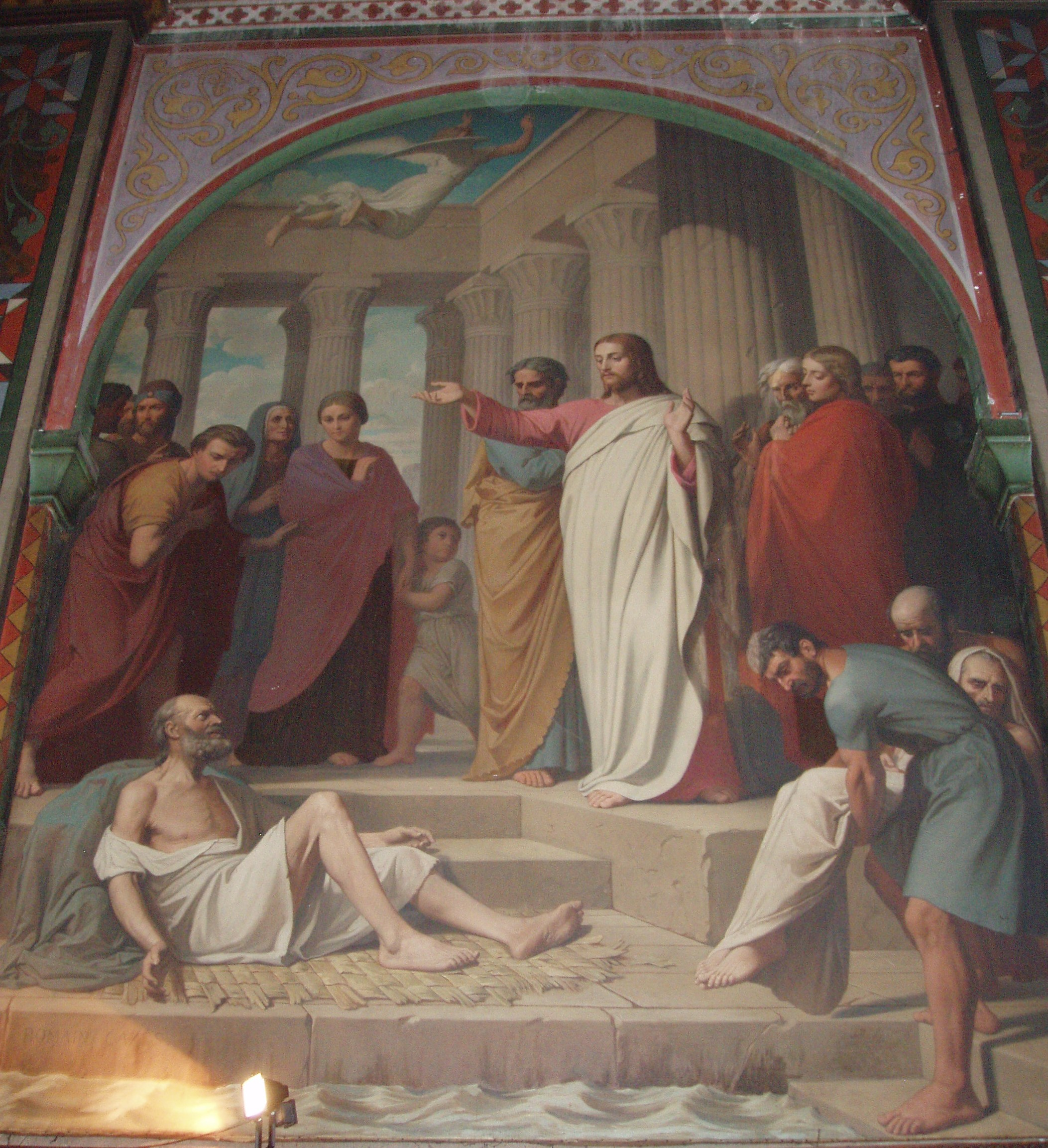
Jesus healing the paralytic at Capernaum, in the church of Bagnères-de-Luchon, Haute Garonne, France.

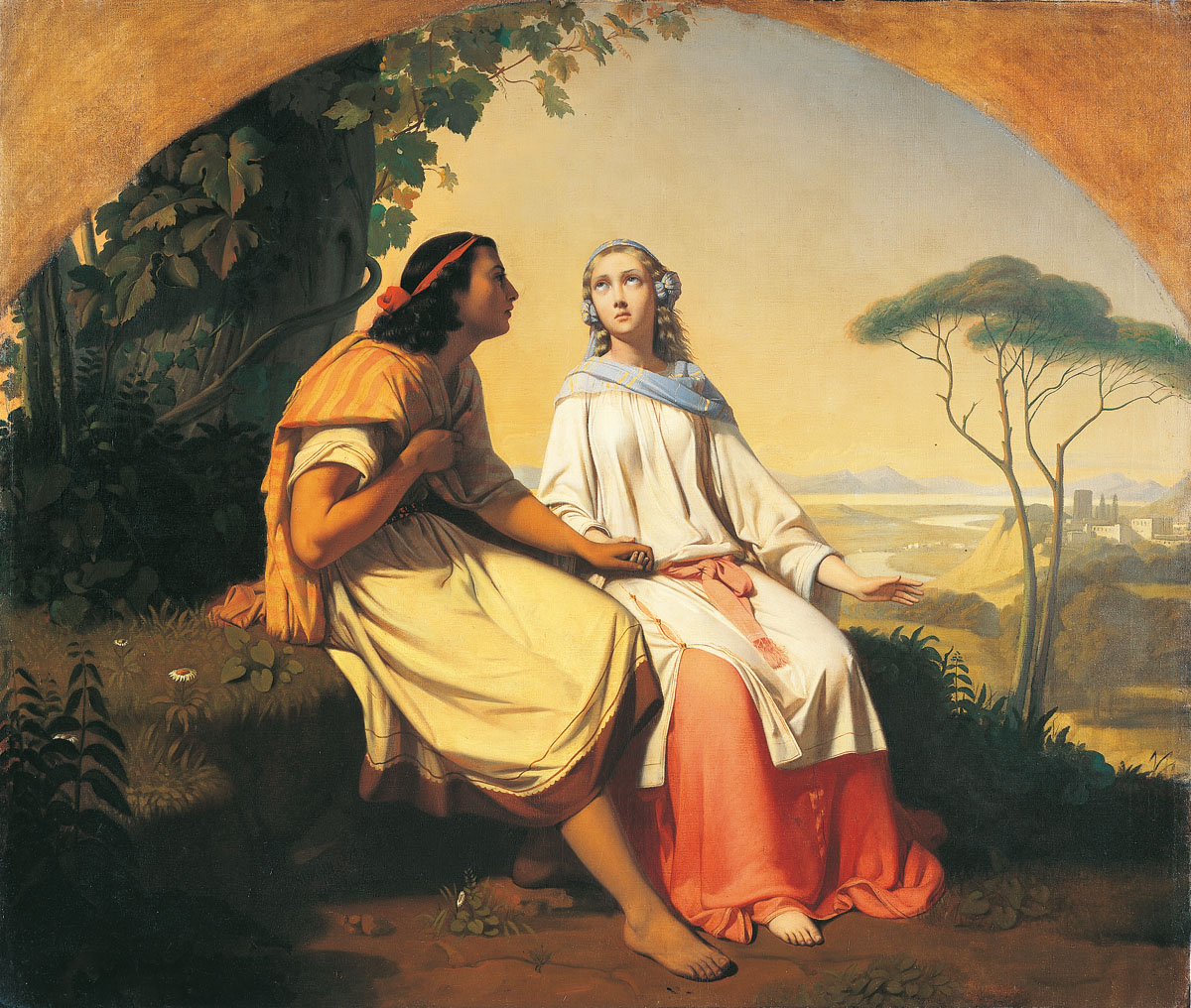
L'Ame exilée, 1838, oil on canvas, in the Musée des Augustins
