= Turckheim =

Commune in Grand Est, France

- Commune
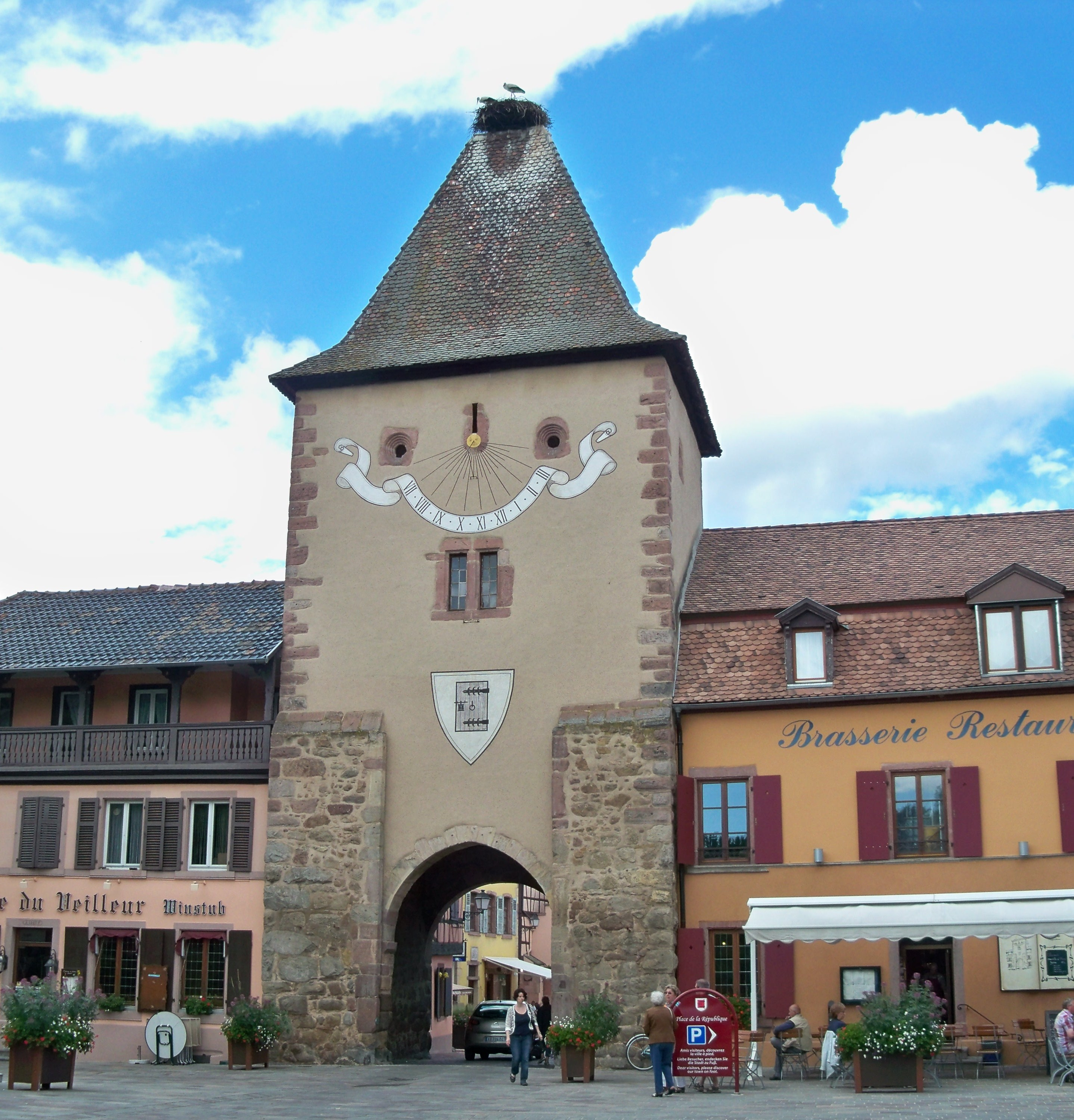
- Entrance to Turckheim through the Porte de France

- Coat of arms
- Location of Turckheim
- Location within France Location within Grand Est
- Coordinates: 48°05′14″N 7°16′52″E
- Country: France
- Region: Grand Est
- Department: Haut-Rhin
- Arrondissement: Colmar-Ribeauvillé
- Canton: Wintzenheim
- Intercommunality: Colmar Agglomération

Government
  - Mayor (2020–2026): Benoît Schlussel
- Area^{1}: 16.46 km^{2} (6.36 sq mi)
- Elevation: 240 m (790 ft)
- Highest elevation: 840 m (2,760 ft)
- Lowest elevation: 219 m (719 ft)
- Population (2023): 4,139
  - Density: 251.5/km^{2} (651.3/sq mi)
- Time zone: UTC+01:00 (CET)
  - Summer (DST): UTC+02:00 (CEST)
- INSEE/Postal code: 68338 /68230
- ^{1} French Land Register data, which excludes lakes, ponds, glaciers > 1 km^{2} (0.386 sq mi or 247 acres) and river estuaries.

Turckheim (French pronunciation: [tyʁkaim]; Alsatian: Tercka; German: Türkheim) is a commune in the Haut-Rhin department in Grand Est in north-eastern France. It lies west of Colmar, on the eastern slopes of the Vosges mountains.

== History ==
Archeological finds indicate the area was already inhabited during Ancient Rome. When the Germanic tribes invaded and crossed the Rhine, the Thuringii settled here and possibly gave their name to the town, which was first Thorencohaime and then Thuringheim. During the High Middle Ages Thuringheim is listed as belonging partly to the abbey of Munster and partly to the manor of Haut-Landsberg, centered in Kientzheim.

Turckheim became a free imperial city in 1312, and in 1315, the construction of ramparts was begun, which are still in good condition. It already had city rights and market rights in 1354, and from 1354 to 1679, Turckheim was part of the Décapole, a league of ten free imperial cities of the Holy Roman Empire. After the Peace of Westphalia (1648), Turckheim and the other Alsatian towns refused to swear allegiance to the French king.

During the Franco-Dutch War, the village of Turckheim was taken by French armies, led by Henri de La Tour d'Auvergne, Viscount of Turenne, which subsequently defeated armies of Austria and Brandenburg in what became known as the Battle of Turckheim (1675). Features of the village of Turckheim, especially the gates, help to identify the town in a fan currently in the Fan Museum in Greenwich, England. In 1678, with the signing of the Treaties of Nijmegen, the French king assumed control over Turckheim.

In 1871, at the end of the Franco-Prussian War, the town, with the rest of the Alsace, became part of the German Empire. In 1918, it reverted to France.

Turckheim is one of only a few remaining towns in France with a municipal night watchman, who makes the rounds at 10 p.m. between 1 May and 31 October and on the three Saturdays preceding Christmas. Maintained for tourist reasons, the position commemorates the 13th-century night watchman who prevented a fire.

== Geography ==
Turckheim lies in the valley of the river Fecht, downstream from Munster. It is 6 km west of the city centre of Colmar.

=== Climate ===
Turckheim has an oceanic climate (Köppen climate classification Cfb). The average annual temperature in Turckheim is 9.4 °C (48.9 °F). The average annual rainfall is 828.0 mm (32.60 in) with December as the wettest month. The temperatures are highest on average in July, at around 18.3 °C (64.9 °F), and lowest in January, at around 1.2 °C (34.2 °F). The highest temperature ever recorded in Turckheim was 35.7 °C (96.3 °F) on 7 August 2015; the coldest temperature ever recorded was −20.0 °C (−4.0 °F) on 13 January 1987.

Climate data for Turckheim (1981–2010 averages, extremes 1986−present)
Month	Jan	Feb	Mar	Apr	May	Jun	Jul	Aug	Sep	Oct	Nov	Dec	Year
Record high °C (°F)	17.7 (63.9)	19.4 (66.9)	23.5 (74.3)	26.0 (78.8)	30.9 (87.6)	34.5 (94.1)	35.5 (95.9)	35.7 (96.3)	30.4 (86.7)	26.4 (79.5)	19.2 (66.6)	18.6 (65.5)	35.7 (96.3)
Mean daily maximum °C (°F)	3.8 (38.8)	4.7 (40.5)	8.1 (46.6)	12.1 (53.8)	17.0 (62.6)	20.1 (68.2)	22.3 (72.1)	22.2 (72.0)	17.5 (63.5)	13.0 (55.4)	7.4 (45.3)	4.1 (39.4)	12.7 (54.9)
Daily mean °C (°F)	1.2 (34.2)	1.9 (35.4)	5.0 (41.0)	8.4 (47.1)	13.1 (55.6)	16.1 (61.0)	18.3 (64.9)	18.3 (64.9)	14.0 (57.2)	10.1 (50.2)	4.8 (40.6)	1.7 (35.1)	9.4 (48.9)
Mean daily minimum °C (°F)	−1.5 (29.3)	−0.9 (30.4)	1.9 (35.4)	4.7 (40.5)	9.2 (48.6)	12.2 (54.0)	14.3 (57.7)	14.3 (57.7)	10.6 (51.1)	7.1 (44.8)	2.3 (36.1)	−0.6 (30.9)	6.2 (43.2)
Record low °C (°F)	−20.0 (−4.0)	−17.4 (0.7)	−13.5 (7.7)	−7.0 (19.4)	−0.5 (31.1)	3.2 (37.8)	6.3 (43.3)	6.2 (43.2)	2.5 (36.5)	−4.2 (24.4)	−11.7 (10.9)	−17.1 (1.2)	−20.0 (−4.0)
Average precipitation mm (inches)	65.4 (2.57)	65.0 (2.56)	63.0 (2.48)	54.3 (2.14)	79.8 (3.14)	69.7 (2.74)	75.0 (2.95)	67.6 (2.66)	65.2 (2.57)	81.0 (3.19)	60.6 (2.39)	81.4 (3.20)	828.0 (32.60)
Average precipitation days (≥ 1.0 mm)	9.9	10.1	10.5	10.5	12.0	10.9	10.9	10.1	9.2	10.4	10.6	10.9	126.1
Source: Météo France

== Population ==
Historical population
Year	Pop.	±% p.a.
1968	3,028	—
1975	3,609	+2.54%
1982	3,510	−0.40%
1990	3,567	+0.20%
1999	3,594	+0.08%
2007	3,731	+0.47%
2012	3,723	−0.04%
2017	3,776	+0.28%
2023	4,139	+1.54%
Source: INSEE

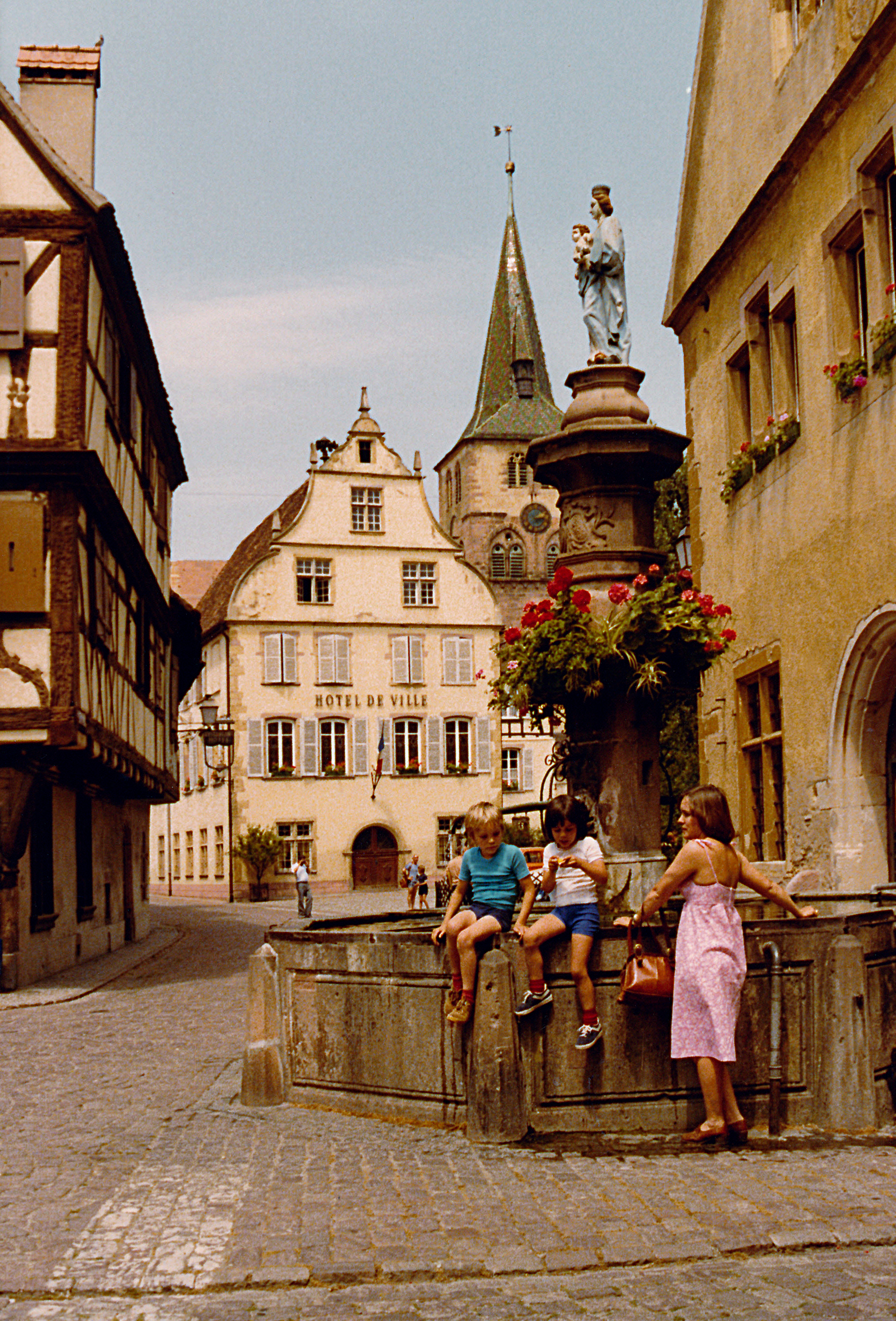
place de Turenne - Stockbrunna Fountain (1725).

== Notable residents ==
- Victor Sieg (1837 – 1899), composer and organist, was born in Turckheim. Rue Victor Sieg is named in his honour.

== See also ==
- Communes of the Haut-Rhin department
- Drei-Ähren Railway
