= Jean Morère =

French operatic tenor (1836–1887)

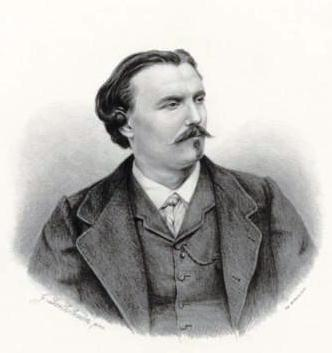
- Born: 6 October 1836; Haute-Garonne, France
- Died: 1887 (aged 50–51); Toulouse, France
- Education: Conservatoire de Paris (1861)
- Occupation: Operatic tenor
- Children: 3

Jean Morère (born Couladère; 6 October 1836 – February 1887) was a French operatic tenor, active from 1861 to 1871. He created the title role in Verdi's Don Carlos and sang primarily at the Paris Opera and at La Monnaie in Brussels. He was born in Couladère and died in Toulouse at the age of 50.

== Life and career ==
Morère was born in Couladère, a commune in the Haute-Garonne department in southwestern France. He studied first in Toulouse and then at the Conservatoire de Paris with Paul Läget. He graduated from the Conservatoire in 1861, winning one of the three First Prizes in singing. The correspondent for Dwight's Journal of Music, who attended the competition, wrote: "M. Morère is a tenor with a pleasant quality of voice, what you may call a pretty voice, sings with taste, and exhibits undoubted marks of talent".

Morère made his debut at the Paris Opera in Giuseppe Verdi's Il trovatore in 1861 and sang there in the world premiere of Victor Sieg's cantata Ivanhoe in 1864. He created the title role in Verdi's Don Carlos, also at the Paris Opera, on 11 March 1867.

Elsewhere, he sang Riccardo in Un ballo in maschera at Opéra de Marseille in 1864. He also sang at La Monnaie in Brussels in the 1865–66 and 1869-70 seasons, where his roles included Vasco da Gama in the theatre's first production of Giacomo Meyerbeer's L'Africaine (1865) and the title role in Meyerbeer's Robert le diable (1870).

Morère experienced a mental breakdown in 1871 in the aftermath of the Franco-Prussian War and retired from the stage. He died in a sanatorium in Toulouse at the age of 50. His wife had died the previous year. At the time of his death, Morère left three children, a grown daughter who was working as a piano teacher, and two young sons aged 10 and 5.
