= Notre-Dame de Clignancourt =

Coordinates: 48°53′35″N 2°20′42″E

Notre-Dame-de-Clignancourt
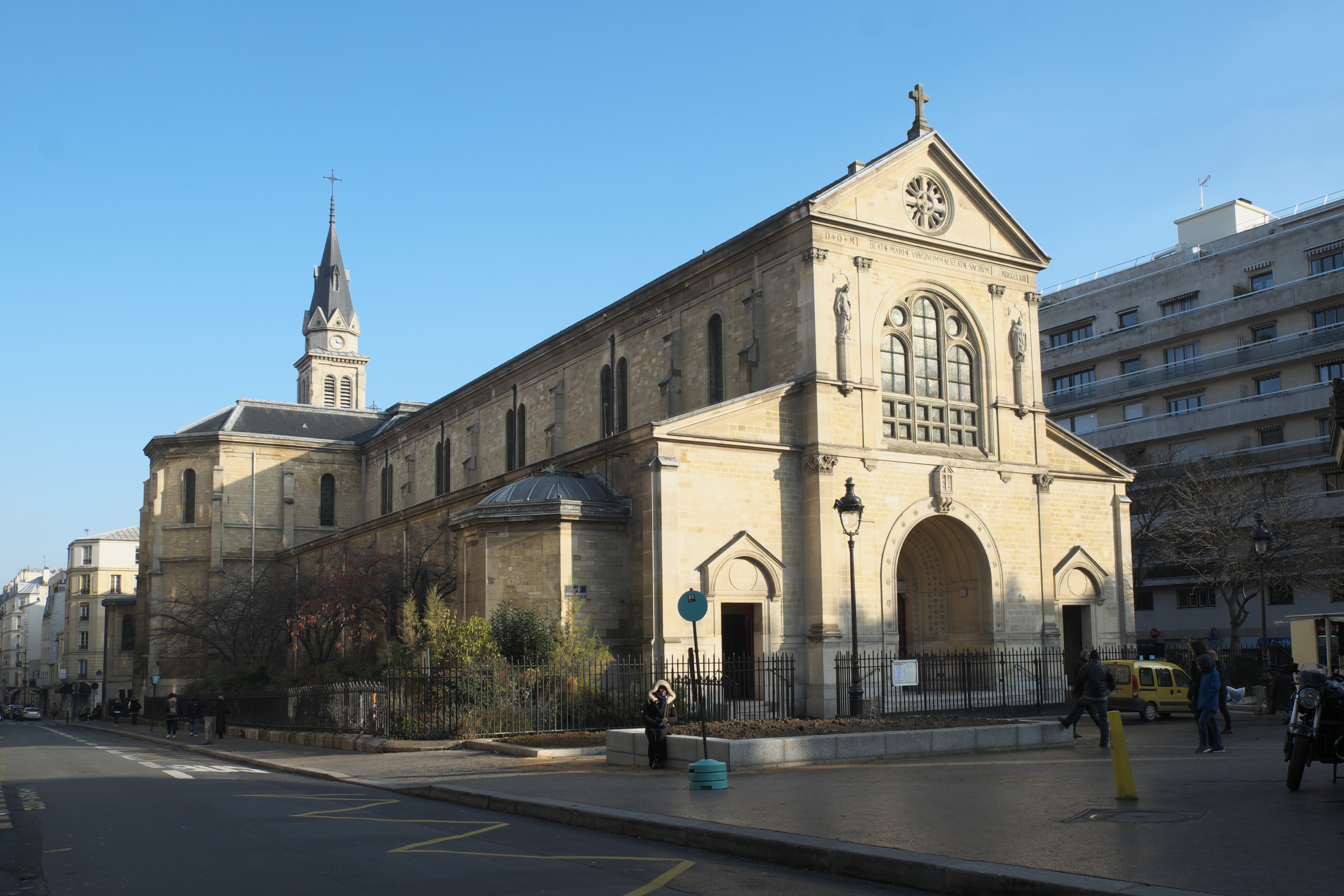
- Notre-Dame-de-Clignancourt
- Location: 18th arrondissement of Paris
- Address: 2 Place Jules Joffrin, 18th arrondissement
- Country: France
- Denomination: Roman Catholic

Architecture
- Style: Romanesque Revival architecture
- Groundbreaking: 1859
- Completed: 1863

Administration
- Archdiocese: Paris

Notre-Dame de Clignancourt (Our Lady of Clignancourt) is a Roman Catholic church located in the 18th arrondissement of Paris. Completed in 1863, the church takes its name from Clignancourt, a small village in the commune of Montmartre that was annexed to Paris in 1860. It was built in the Romanesque Revival style.

The church is located at 2 place Jules Joffrin (18th Are.). The nearest Metro stations are Jules Joffrin or Simplon.

== History ==
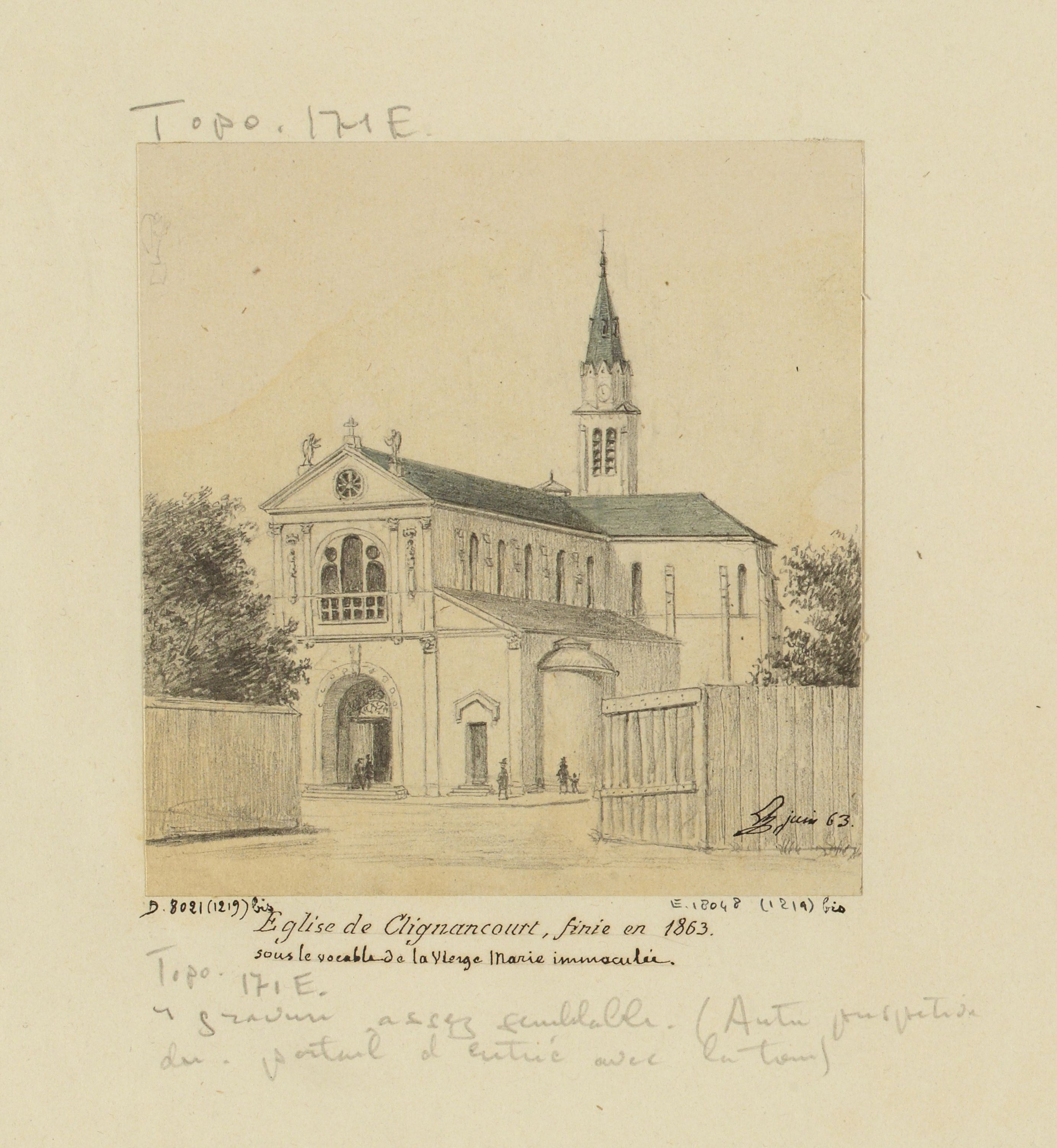
The church in 1863

Until the Second Empire of Napoleon III, Clignancourt was a small country village north of Paris. The creation of new industries and influx of population under the Empire soon required a larger church. Notre Dame de Clignancourt was one of three new parishes created under Emperor Napoleon III to accommodate the growing population in the northern edge of the city. It was designed in the Neo-Romanesque style by Paul-Eugène Lequeux. It was authorised by the Paris counciɬ 1858, and the first stone placed by the prefect of Paris, Georges-Eugène Haussmann, in May 1859. The entire cost of the church, 800,000 francs, was paid by the Emperor. The Empress, for her part, donated a large part of the furniture. Many of the valuable pieces of furniture and religious objects donated by Empress Eugenie, were lost or damaged when the church was pillaged by rioters during the Paris Commune in 1871.

== Exterior ==
The facade of the church is more characteristic of the Neo-classical style than the interior. The tympanum of the central portal depicts the crowning of the Virgin. It was made by the sculptor Louis Schroeder (1828-1898), who also made the sculptures of the two patron saints of Paris, Saint Denis and Saint Genevieve, on the facade.

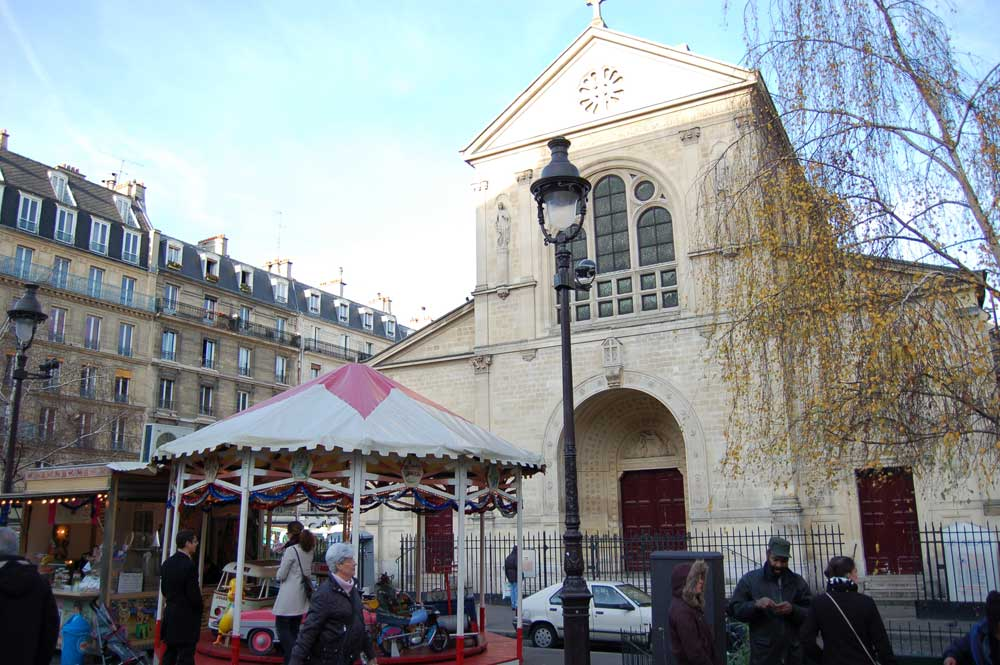
The facade on Place Jules Joffrin

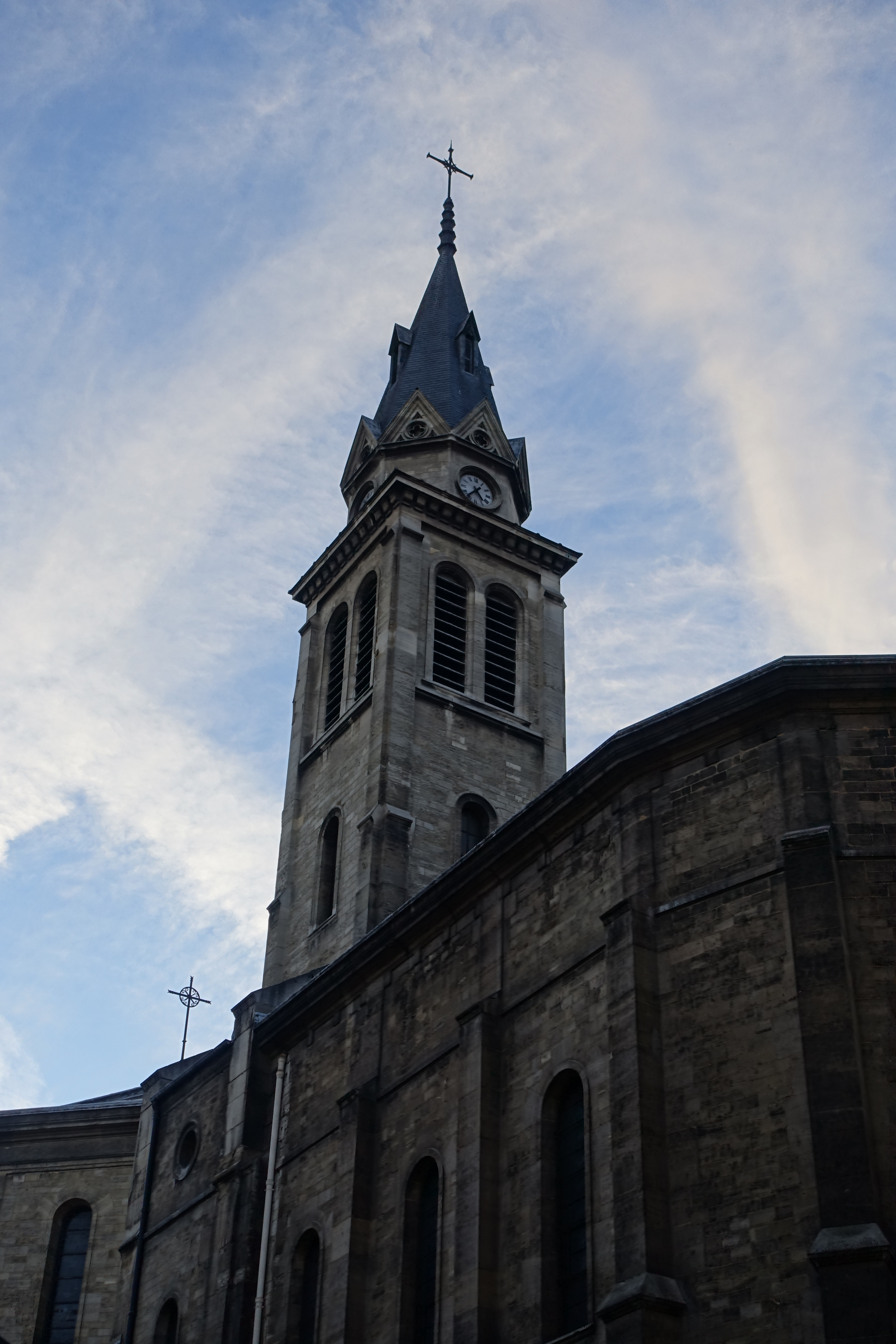
The bell tower

== Interior ==
The interior of the church is very dim, a consequence of the smaller windows of the Neo-Romanesque style. It is lined with rounded arches and Neo-Romansque pillars covered with stucco imitating marble.

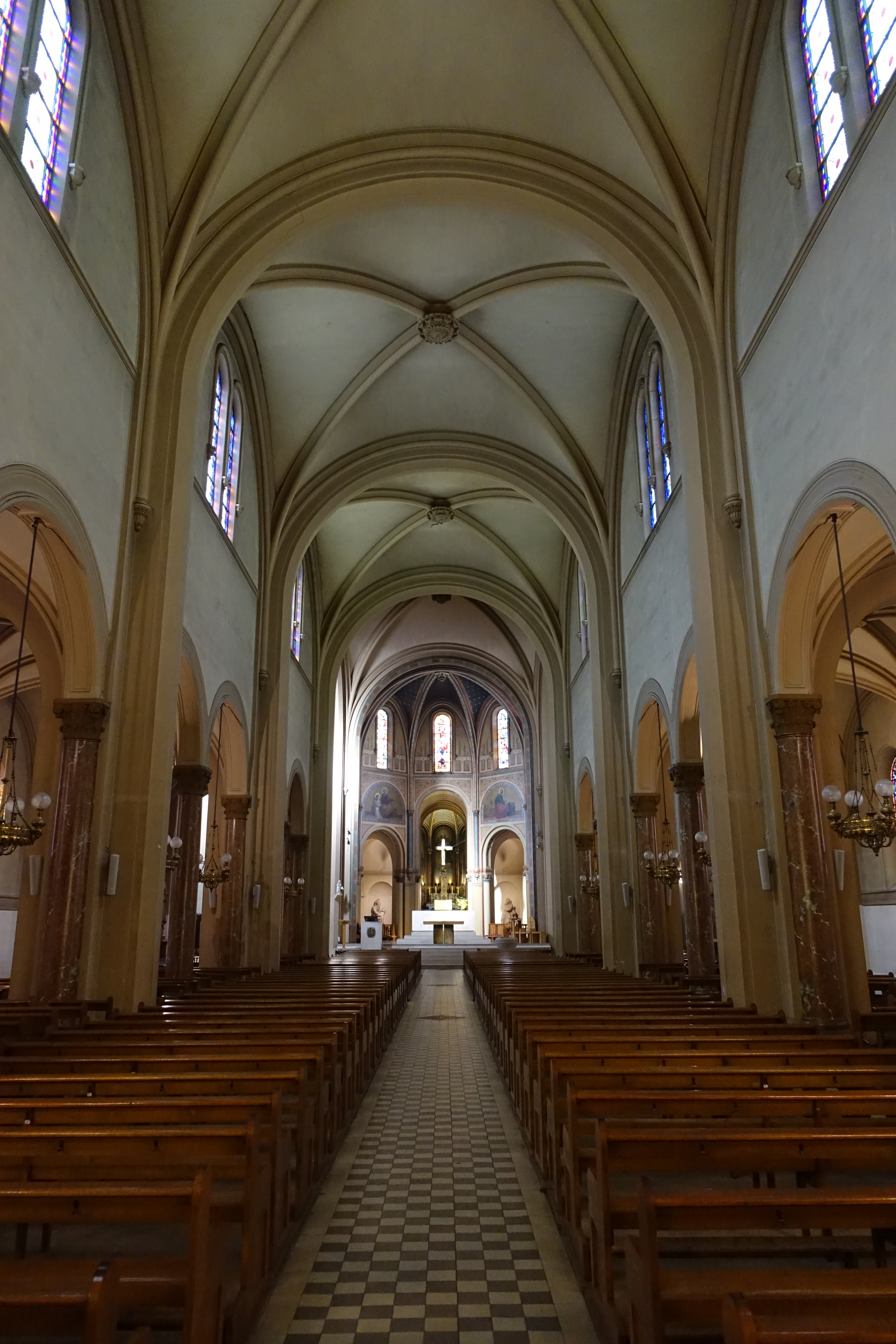
The nave, looking toward the choir

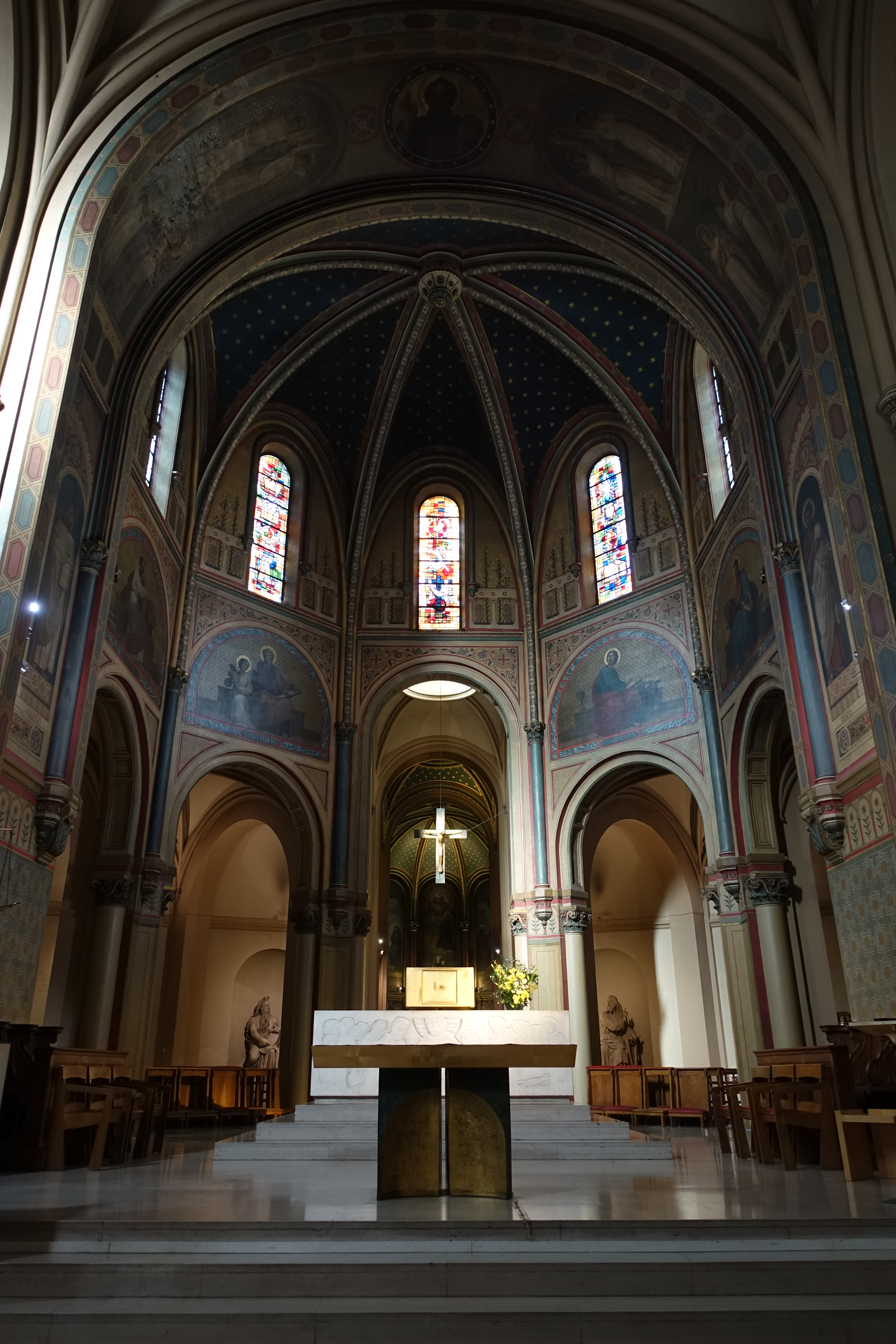
The choir and altar

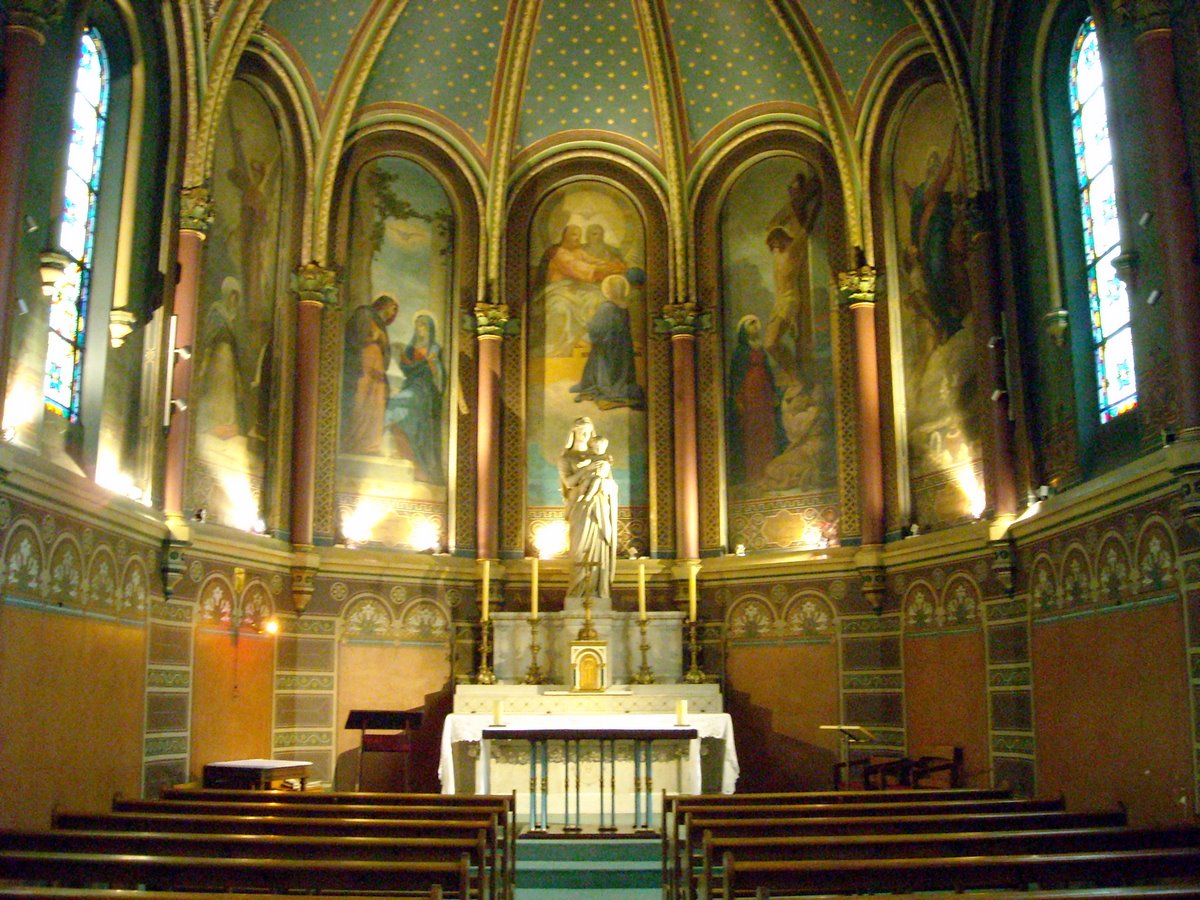
Chapel of the Virgin

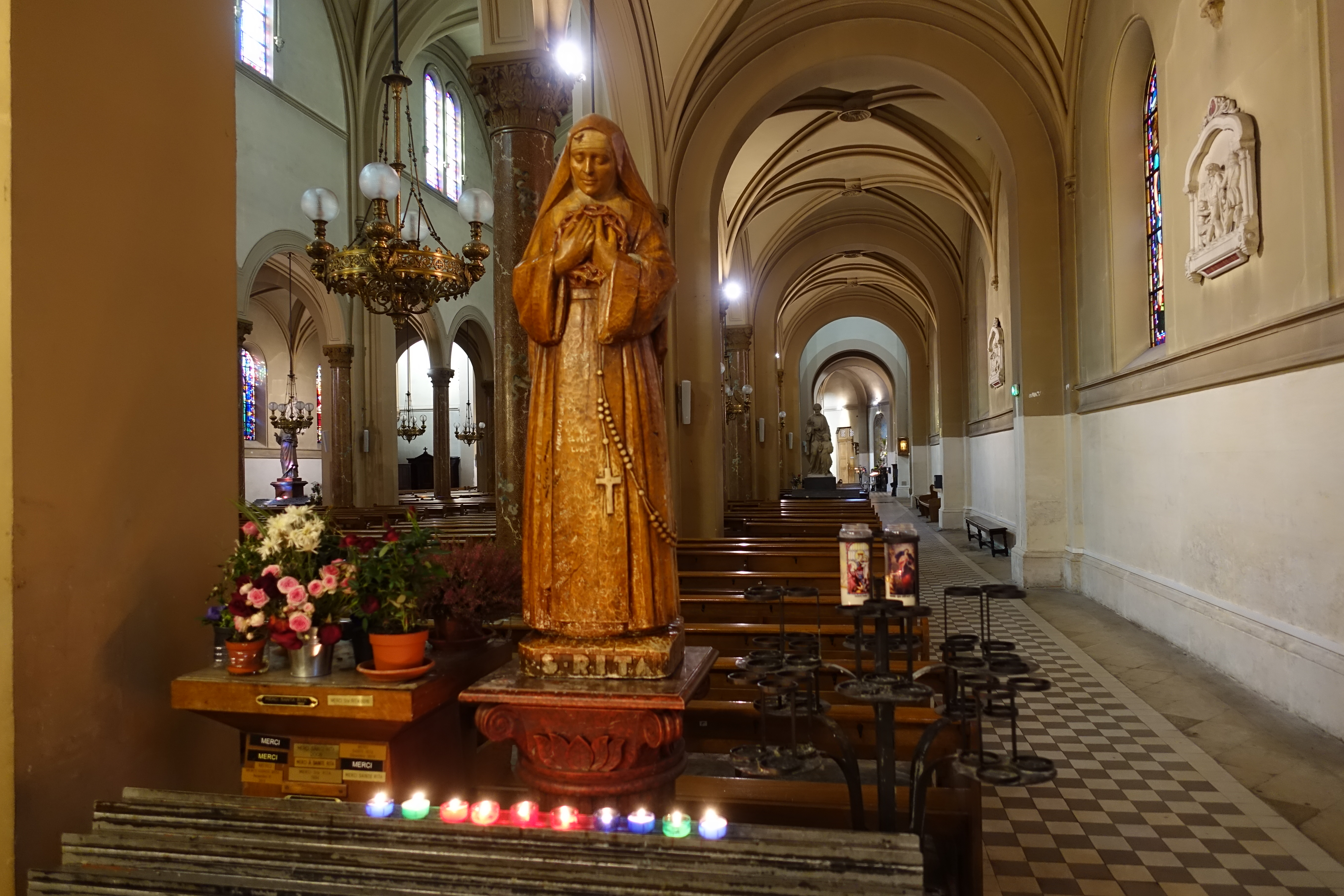
Side aisle with statue of the Virgin Mary

The apse mid-level is surrounded by murals of the four apostles, each with his attributes, painted by Romain Cazes.

=== Chapel of the Virgin ===
The Chapel of the Virgin displays paintings by Felix-Joseph Barris depicting scenes from the life of the Virgin Mary; "The Annunciatioɳ" "The Visitation", "The Glorification of Mary", "Calvary" and "The Assumption." The centerpiece is the altar, topped by a statue of the Virgin and Child by Auguste-Louis Ottin (1811-1890). The child reaches out his arms to the world

== Art and Decoration ==
The church still contains paintings and frescos by prominent 19th-century artists, including Romain Cazes and Félix-Joseph Barrias, and a large marble sculpture depicting the Pietà. The stained glass windows in the lower part of the church are largely from the Art Deco period. The windows in the choir, depicting the Holy Trinity and the Litany of Loreto, were made by Jacques Le Chevallier in the 1970s.

=== Stained Glass ===
The stained glass is mostly late 20th century. and presents an abundance of color. Many are in the Art Deco style. The Lorin Wtrkshop in Chartres made a large number of the windows, of which some ares signed by Charles Lorin. The windows of the choir include a séries called "Litanies of the Virgin and the Holy Trinity" made by Jacques Le Chevallier en 1970.

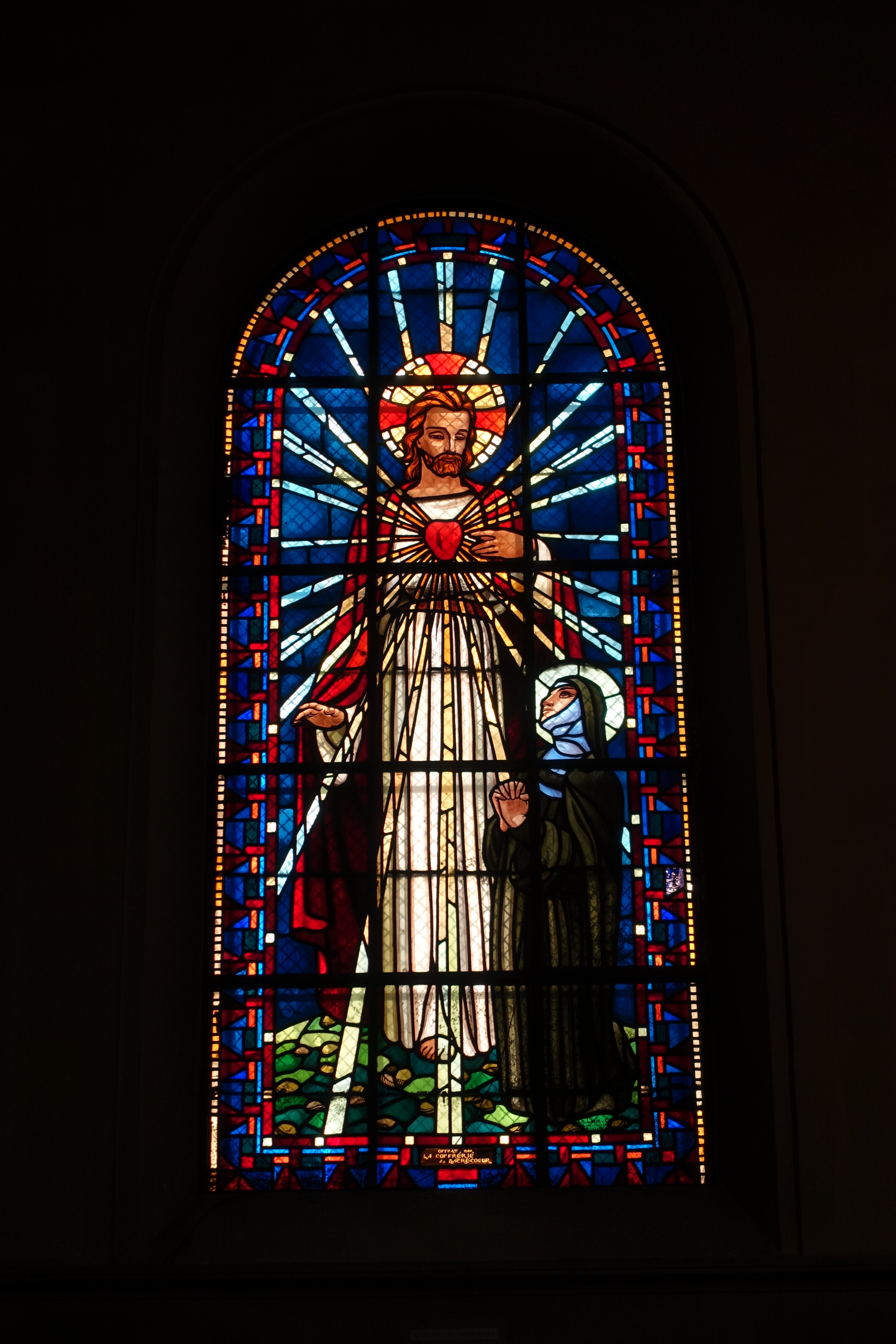
"The Sacred Heart"

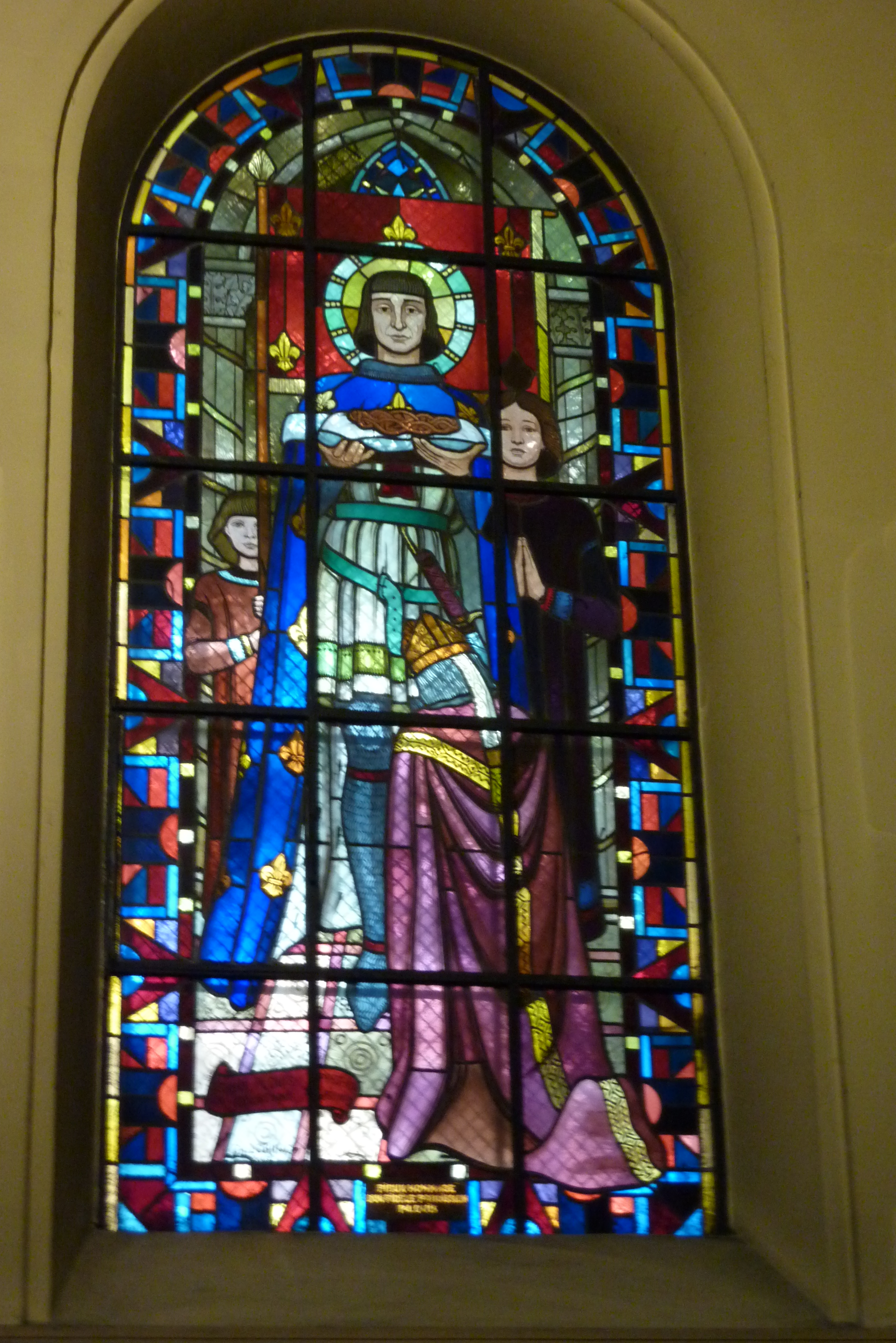
"Saint Louis presents the Crown of Thorns"

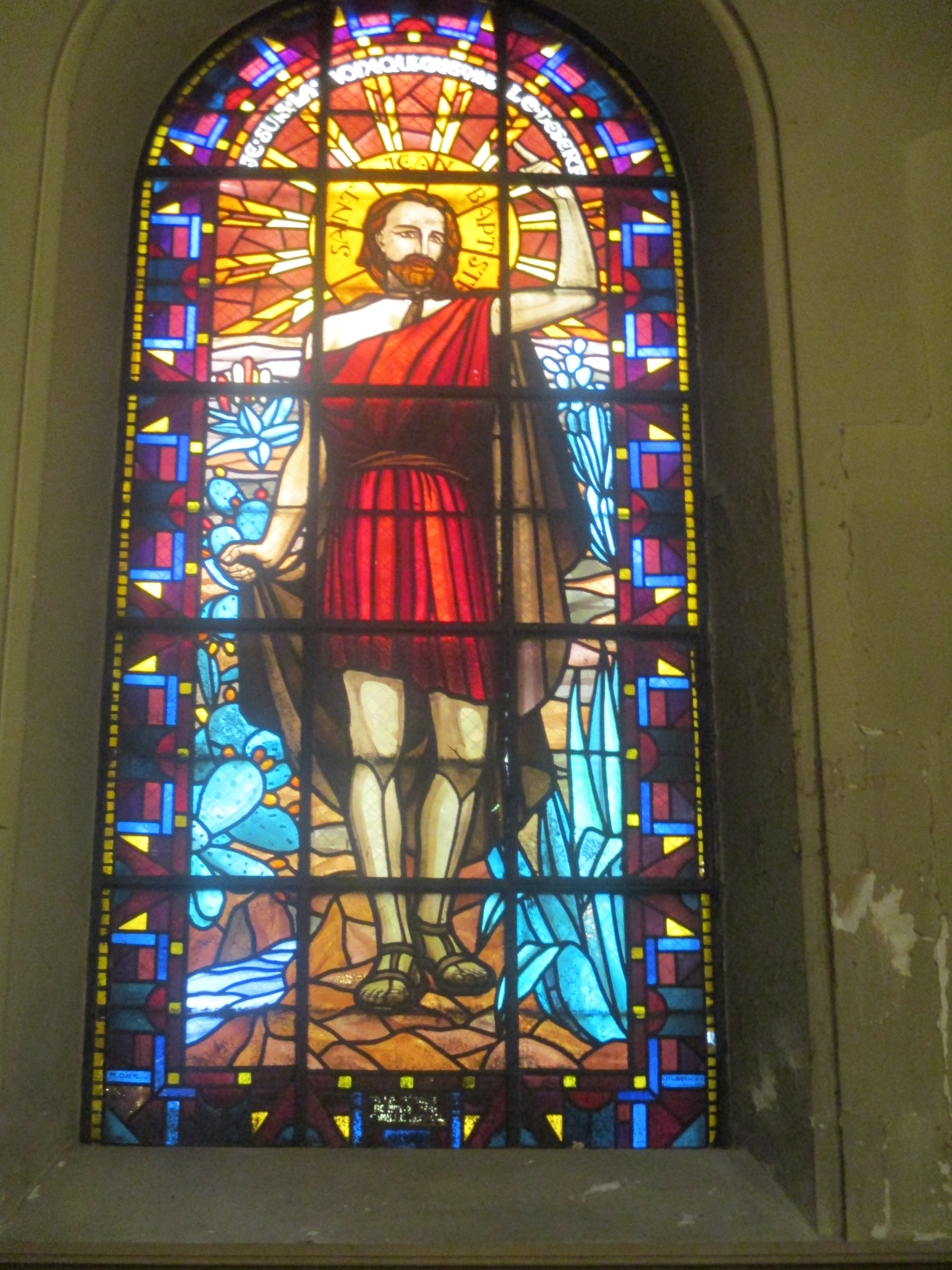
"Saint Jean the Baptist"

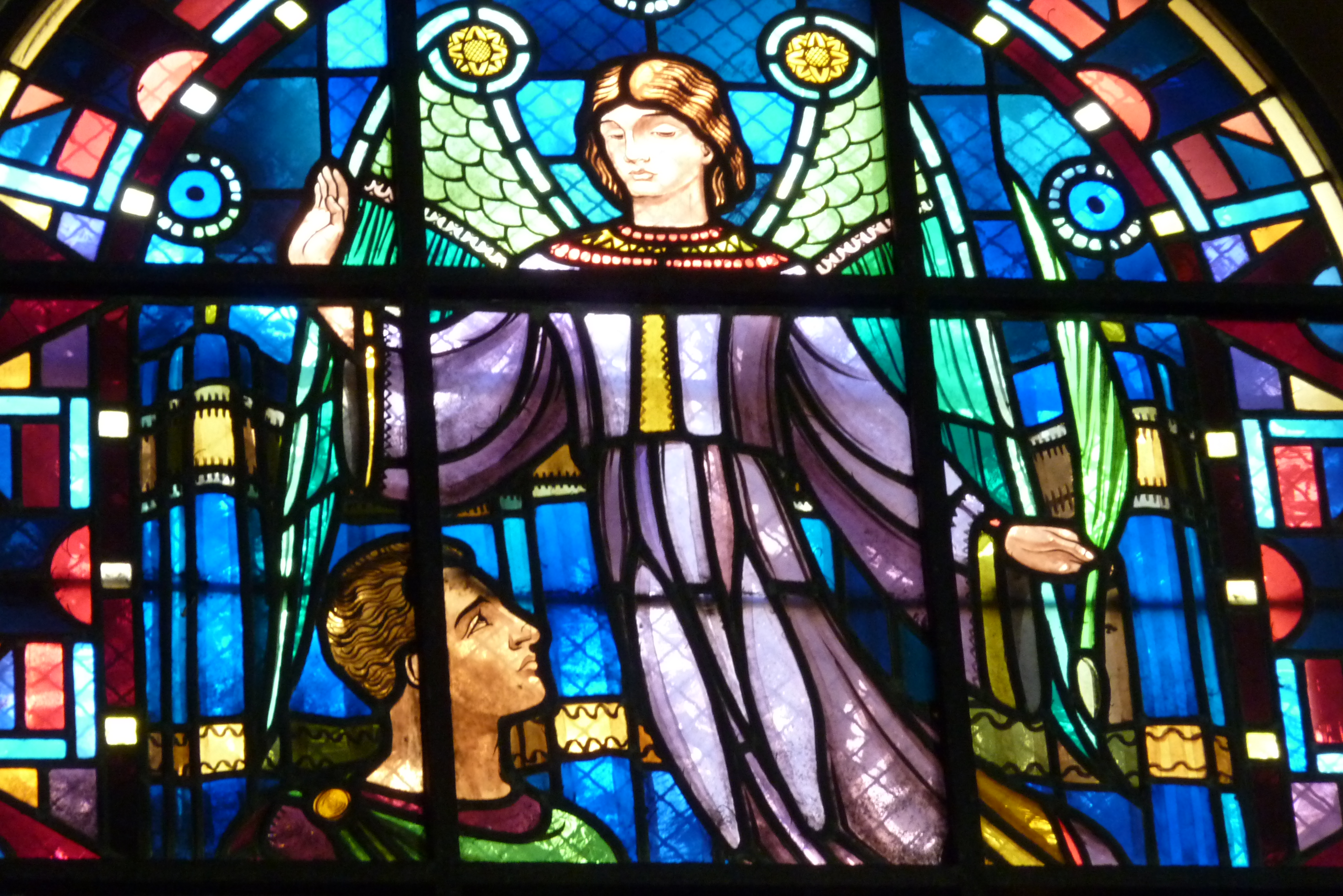
"Saint Cecilia"

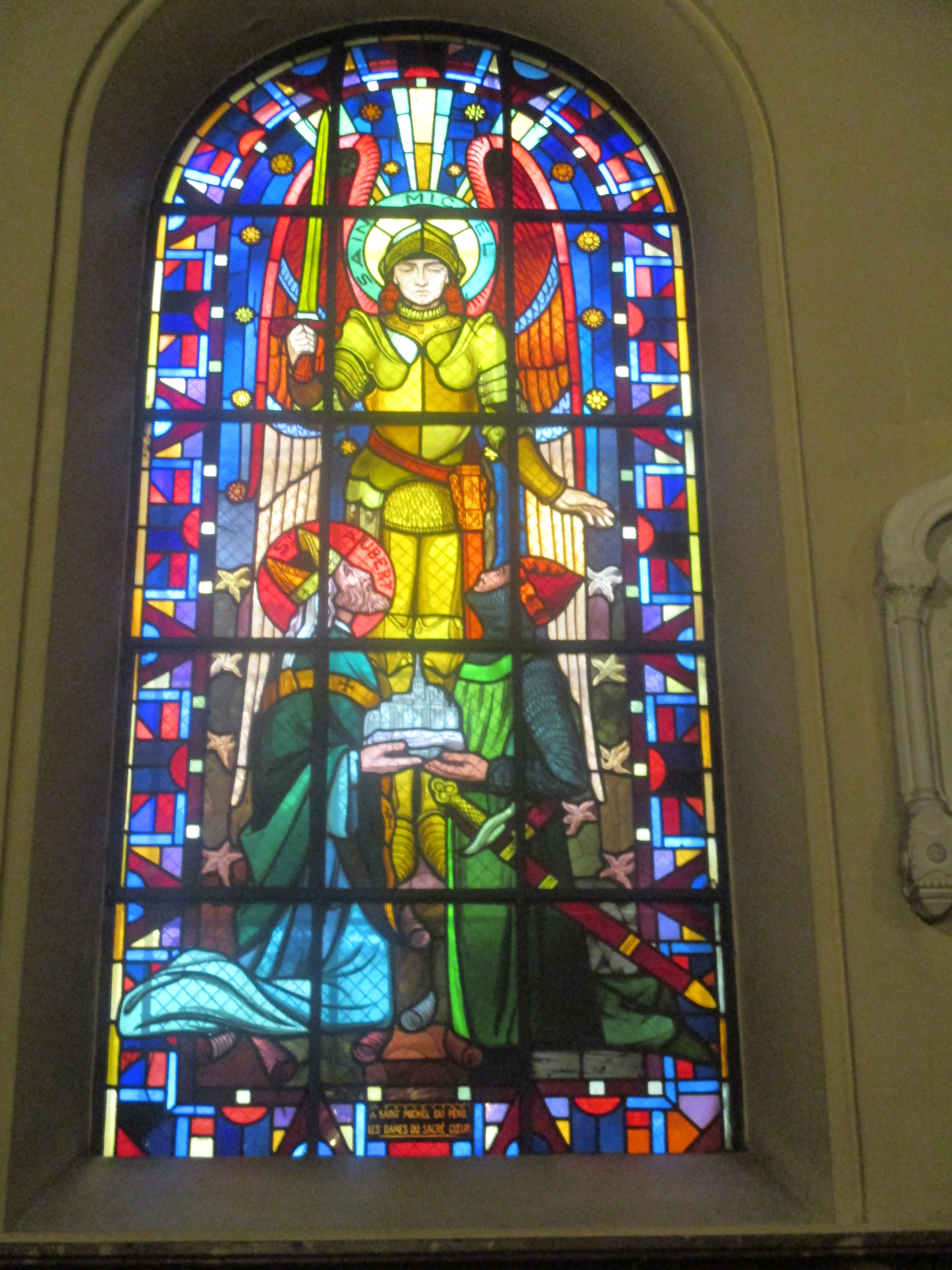
"Saint Michael and Saint Aubert"

== The Organ ==
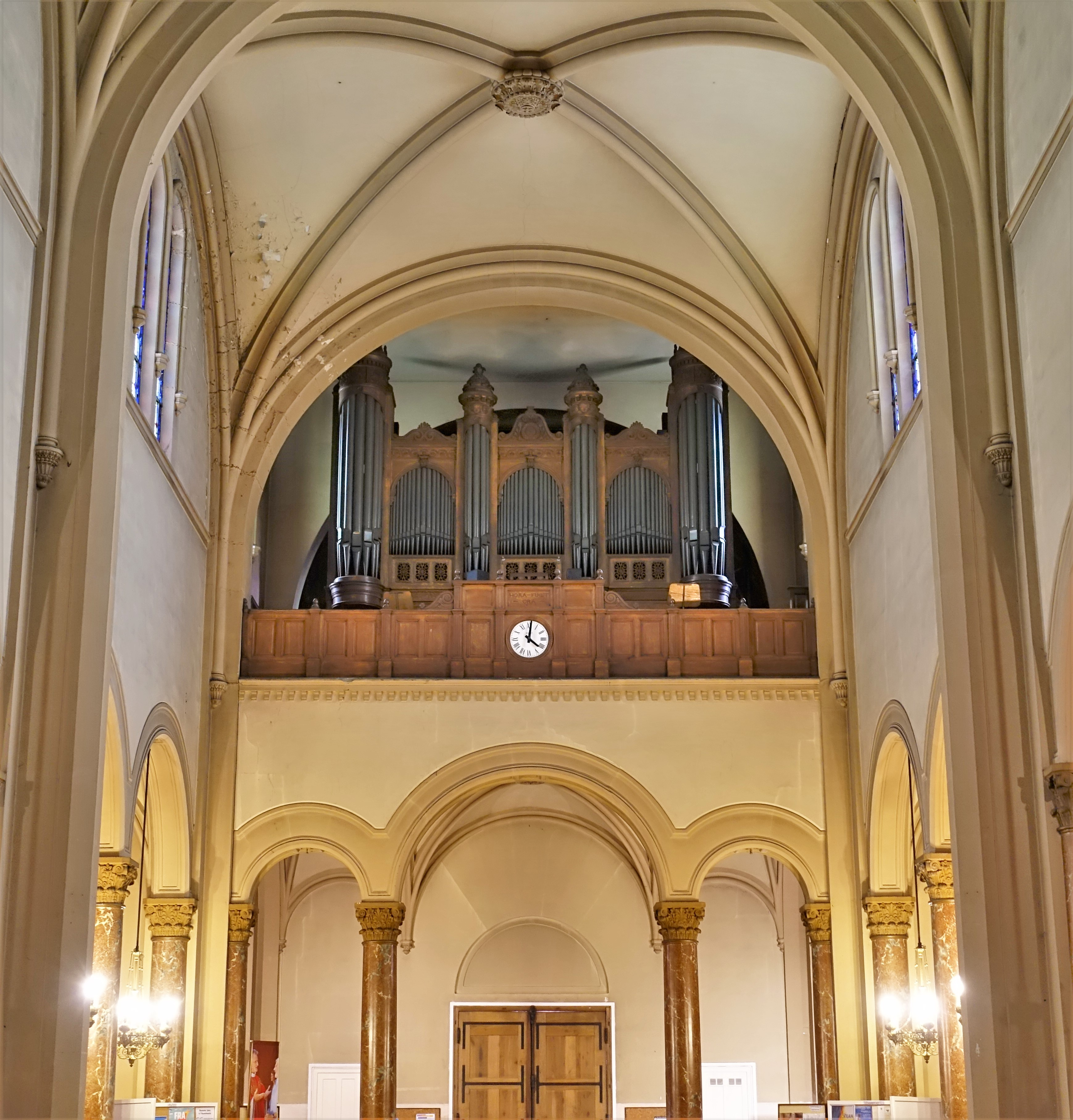
The grand organ in the tribune over the portal of the nave

The organ in Notre-Dame de Clignancourt was built by Joseph Merklin in the 19th century. Several prominent musicians are associated with the church. Gabriel Fauré and Victor Sieg both served as organists there. Louis Vierne played the organ for the funeral of the French violinist Henri Adam held at the church in 1890, and the composer André Jolivet attended the church's choir school in his youth.
