= Arrondissement of Thann =

Former municipality in Grand Est, France

Coordinates: 47°49′N 7°06′E

Thann
- Former arrondissement
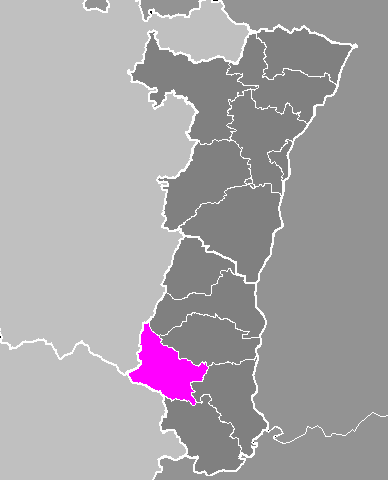
- Location within the former region Alsace
- Country: France
- Region: Grand Est
- Department: Haut-Rhin
- No. of communes: {{{nbcomm}}}
- Disbanded: 2015
- Area: 525 km^{2} (203 sq mi)
- Population (2012): 81,614
  - Density: 155/km^{2} (403/sq mi)

The arrondissement of Thann is a former arrondissement of France in the Haut-Rhin department in the Alsace region. In 2015 it was disbanded, and most of its communes were assigned to the new arrondissement of Thann-Guebwiller, some to the arrondissements of Mulhouse and Altkirch. It had 52 communes, and its population was 81,614 (2012).

== Composition ==
The communes of the arrondissement of Thann, and their INSEE codes, were:

1. Aspach-le-Bas (68011)	2. Aspach-le-Haut (68012)	3. Bernwiller (68031)	4. Bitschwiller-lès-Thann (68040)
5. Bourbach-le-Bas (68045)	6. Bourbach-le-Haut (68046)	7. Burnhaupt-le-Bas (68059)	8. Burnhaupt-le-Haut (68060)
9. Cernay (68063)	10. Dolleren (68073)	11. Fellering (68089)	12. Geishouse (68102)
13. Goldbach-Altenbach (68106)	14. Guewenheim (68115)	15. Husseren-Wesserling (68151)	16. Kirchberg (68167)
17. Kruth (68171)	18. Lauw (68179)	19. Leimbach (68180)	20. Malmerspach (68199)
21. Masevaux (68201)	22. Michelbach (68206)	23. Mitzach (68211)	24. Mollau (68213)
25. Moosch (68217)	26. Mortzwiller (68219)	27. Niederbruck (68233)	28. Oberbruck (68239)
29. Oderen (68247)	30. Rammersmatt (68261)	31. Ranspach (68262)	32. Rimbach-près-Masevaux (68275)
33. Roderen (68279)	34. Saint-Amarin (68292)	35. Schweighouse-Thann (68302)	36. Sentheim (68304)
37. Sewen (68307)	38. Sickert (68308)	39. Soppe-le-Bas (68313)	40. Soppe-le-Haut (68314)
41. Staffelfelden (68321)	42. Steinbach (68322)	43. Storckensohn (68328)	44. Thann (68334)
45. Uffholtz (68342)	46. Urbès (68344)	47. Vieux-Thann (68348)	48. Wattwiller (68359)
49. Wegscheid (68361)	50. Wildenstein (68370)	51. Willer-sur-Thur (68372)	52. Wittelsheim (68375)

== History ==
The arrondissement of Thann was created in 1919. It was disbanded in 2015. As a result of the reorganisation of the cantons of France which came into effect in 2015, the borders of the cantons are no longer related to the borders of the arrondissements. The cantons of the arrondissement of Thann were, as of January 2015:

1. Cernay
2. Masevaux
3. Saint-Amarin
4. Thann
