= Canton of Thann =

Coordinates: 47.8167°N 7.0833°E

Thann
- Former canton
- Interactive map of Thann
- Country: France
- Region: Grand Est
- Department: Haut-Rhin
- No. of communes: {{{nbcomm}}}
- Disbanded: 2015
- Area: 91.08 km^{2} (35.17 sq mi)
- Population (2012): 20,403
  - Density: 224.0/km^{2} (580.2/sq mi)

The Canton of Thann is a French former administrative division, located in the département of Haut-Rhin and the region Alsace. It had 20,403 inhabitants (2012). It was disbanded following the French canton reorganisation which came into effect in March 2015.

The canton comprised the following communes:

- Aspach-le-Haut
- Bitschwiller-lès-Thann
- Bourbach-le-Bas
- Guewenheim
- Leimbach
- Michelbach
- Rammersmatt
- Roderen
- Thann (seat)
- Vieux-Thann
- Willer-sur-Thur
