= Château de Freundstein =

French castle

Coordinates: 47.8601°N 7.1197°E

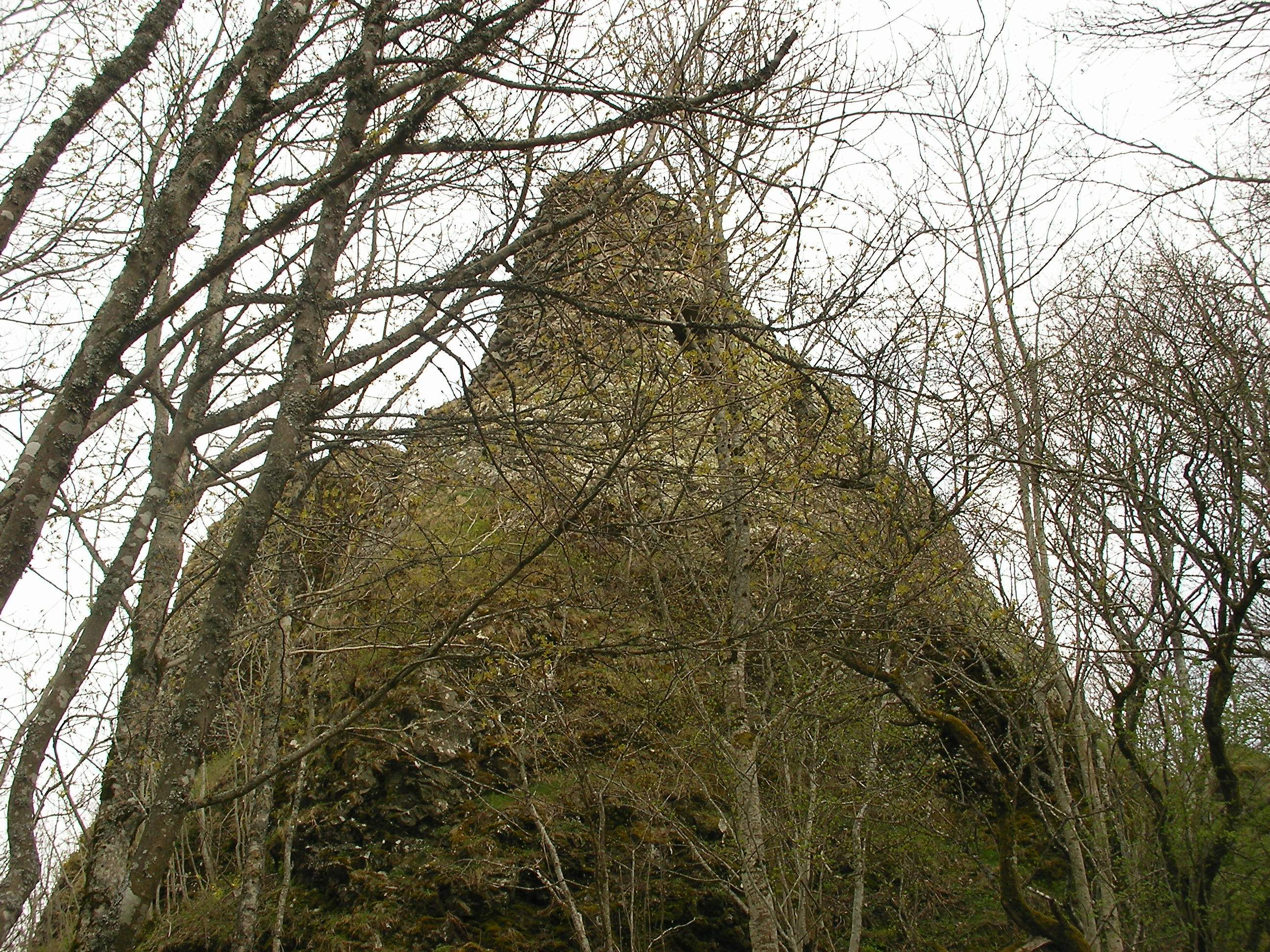
Château de Freundstein

Château de Freundstein is a ruined castle in the commune of Goldbach-Altenbach, in the department of Haut-Rhin, Alsace, France. It has been a listed historical monument since 1922.

== History ==
The castle was recorded in 1297. It ownership was shared between the abbey at Murbach and the bishops of Strasbourg. It was given as a fiefdom to the Waldner family who still own it. In 1441, it was attacked by the Mulhouse and in 1525 by rebellious peasants. It was restored in the 16th century, but abandoned shortly afterwards. The ruins were used as a military observatory during the First World War.

== Description ==
The ruins consist of sections of wall from the high castle, with loopholes and more recent openings.
