= Arrondissement of Thann-Guebwiller =

Coordinates: 47.83°N 7.17°E

Thann-Guebwiller
- Arrondissement
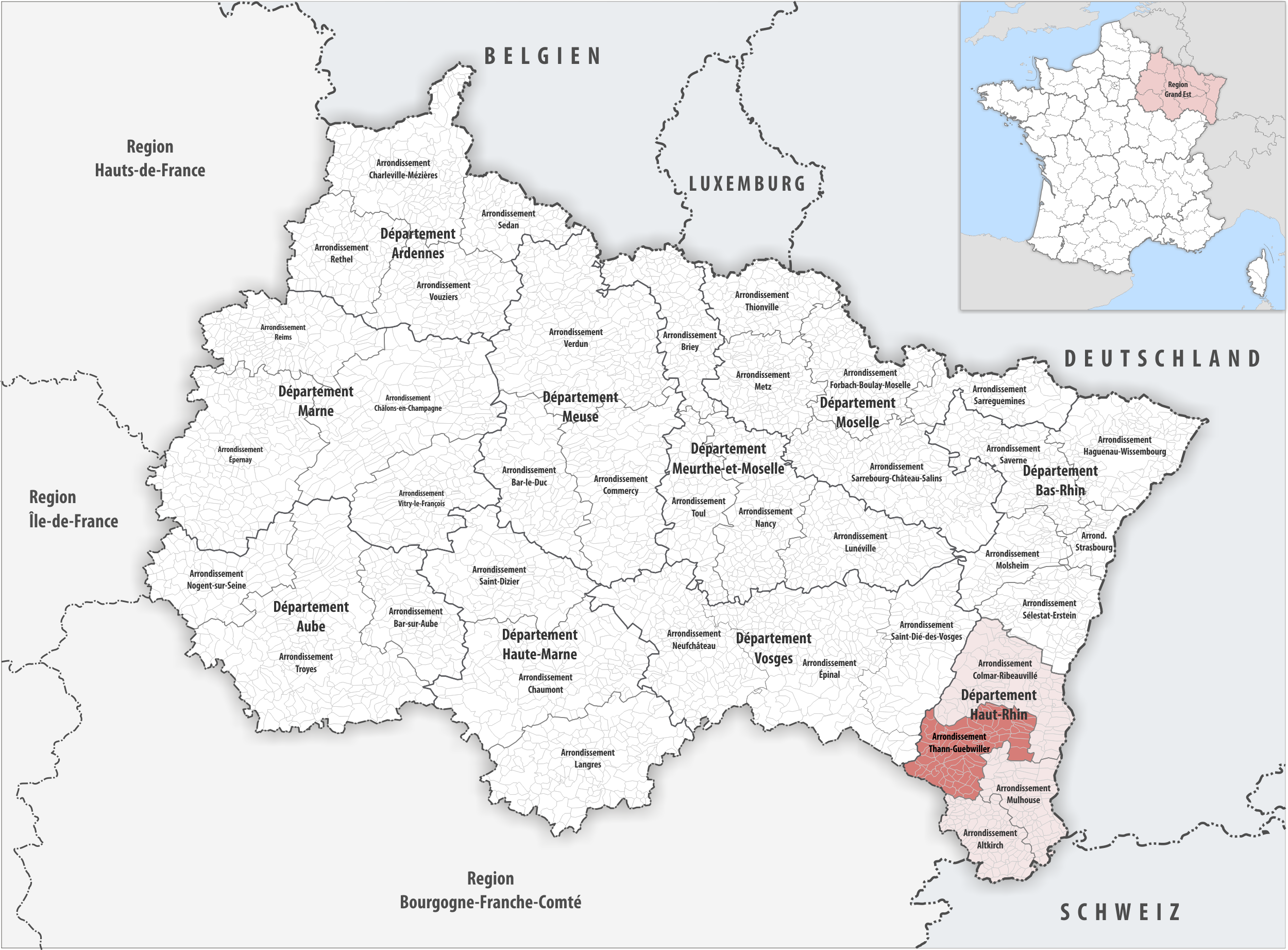
- Location within the region Grand Est
- Country: France
- Region: Grand Est
- Department: Haut-Rhin
- No. of communes: {{{nbcomm}}}
- Area: 907.1 km^{2} (350.2 sq mi)
- Population (2023): 130,091
  - Density: 143.4/km^{2} (371.4/sq mi)
- INSEE code: 686

The arrondissement of Thann-Guebwiller is an arrondissement of France in the Haut-Rhin department in the Grand Est region. It has 81 communes. Its population is 129,855 (2021), and its area is 907.1 km^{2} (350.2 sq mi).

== Composition ==
The communes of the arrondissement of Thann-Guebwiller are:

1. Aspach-le-Bas
2. Aspach-Michelbach
3. Bergholtz
4. Bergholtzzell
5. Biltzheim
6. Bitschwiller-lès-Thann
7. Bourbach-le-Bas
8. Bourbach-le-Haut
9. Buhl
10. Burnhaupt-le-Bas
11. Burnhaupt-le-Haut
12. Cernay
13. Dolleren
14. Ensisheim
15. Fellering
16. Geishouse
17. Goldbach-Altenbach
18. Gueberschwihr
19. Guebwiller
20. Guewenheim
21. Gundolsheim
22. Hartmannswiller
23. Hattstatt
24. Le Haut-Soultzbach
25. Husseren-Wesserling
26. Issenheim
27. Jungholtz
28. Kirchberg
29. Kruth
30. Lautenbach
31. Lautenbachzell
32. Lauw
33. Leimbach
34. Linthal
35. Malmerspach
36. Masevaux-Niederbruck
37. Merxheim
38. Meyenheim
39. Mitzach
40. Mollau
41. Moosch
42. Munwiller
43. Murbach
44. Niederentzen
45. Niederhergheim
46. Oberbruck
47. Oberentzen
48. Oberhergheim
49. Oderen
50. Orschwihr
51. Osenbach
52. Pfaffenheim
53. Raedersheim
54. Rammersmatt
55. Ranspach
56. Réguisheim
57. Rimbach-près-Guebwiller
58. Rimbach-près-Masevaux
59. Rimbachzell
60. Roderen
61. Rouffach
62. Saint-Amarin
63. Schweighouse-Thann
64. Sentheim
65. Sewen
66. Sickert
67. Soppe-le-Bas
68. Soultz-Haut-Rhin
69. Soultzmatt
70. Steinbach
71. Storckensohn
72. Thann
73. Uffholtz
74. Urbès
75. Vieux-Thann
76. Wattwiller
77. Wegscheid
78. Westhalten
79. Wildenstein
80. Willer-sur-Thur
81. Wuenheim

== History ==
The arrondissement of Thann-Guebwiller was created in January 2015 from 42 communes of the former arrondissement of Guebwiller and 49 communes of the former arrondissement of Thann. In January 2017 seven communes from the arrondissement of Thann-Guebwiller joined the arrondissement of Colmar-Ribeauvillé.
