= Kruth =

Commune in Grand Est, France

- Commune
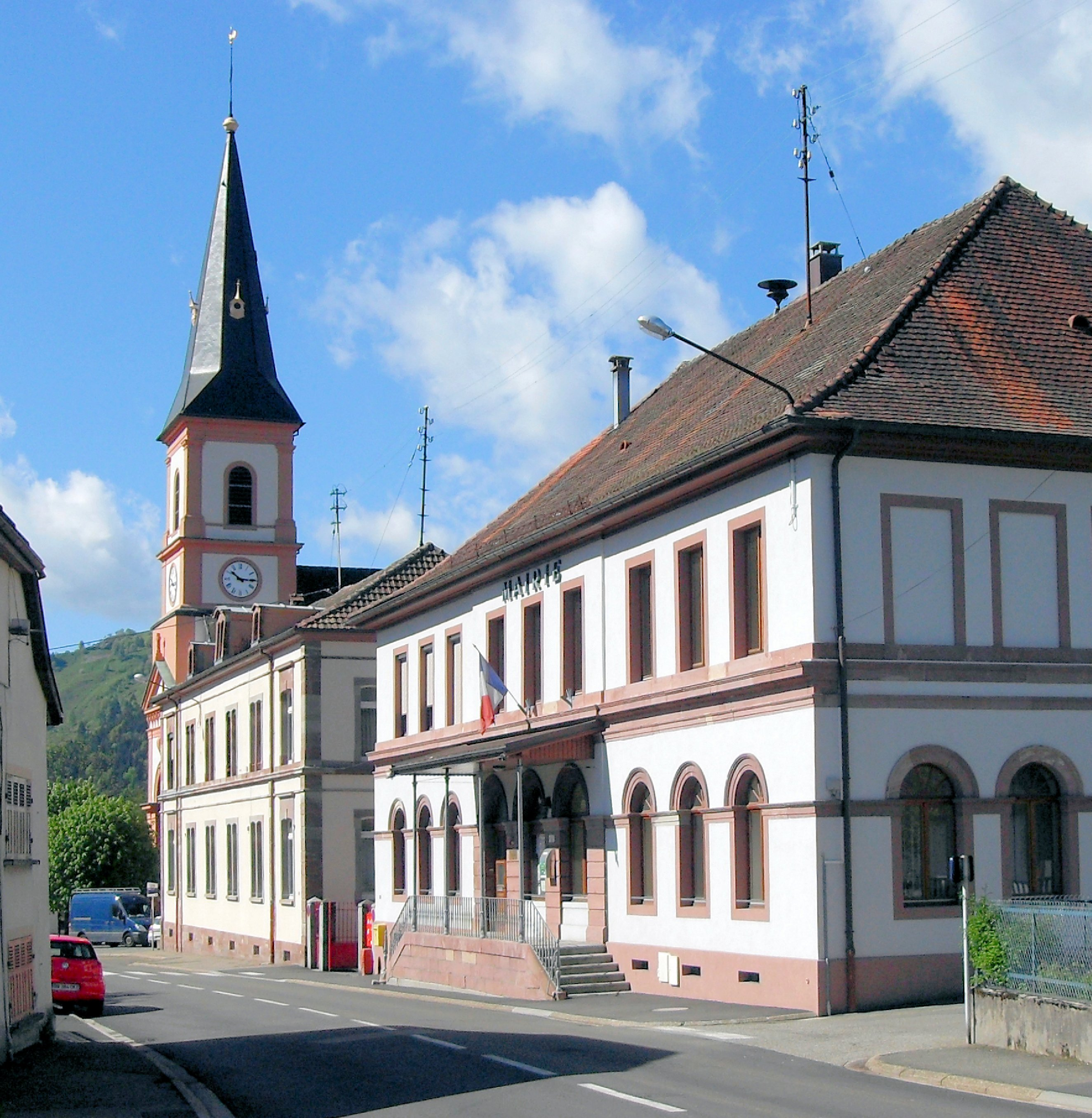
- The town hall

- Coat of arms
- Location of Kruth
- Location within France Location within Grand Est
- Coordinates: 47°55′54″N 6°57′53″E
- Country: France
- Region: Grand Est
- Department: Haut-Rhin
- Arrondissement: Thann-Guebwiller
- Canton: Cernay
- Intercommunality: Vallée de Saint-Amarin

Government
  - Mayor (2020–2026): Florent Arnold
- Area^{1}: 223.06 km^{2} (86.12 sq mi)
- Elevation: 487 m (1,598 ft)
- Highest elevation: 1,263 m (4,144 ft)
- Lowest elevation: 468 m (1,535 ft)
- Population (2023): 856
  - Density: 3.84/km^{2} (9.94/sq mi)
- Time zone: UTC+01:00 (CET)
  - Summer (DST): UTC+02:00 (CEST)
- INSEE/Postal code: 68171 /68820
- ^{1} French Land Register data, which excludes lakes, ponds, glaciers > 1 km^{2} (0.386 sq mi or 247 acres) and river estuaries.

Kruth (French pronunciation: [kʁyt]; German: Krüt) is a commune in the Haut-Rhin department in Grand Est in north-eastern France. Its railway station is the terminus of a TER service to Mulhouse.

== Geography ==
=== Climate ===
Kruth has a humid continental climate (Köppen climate classification Dfb) closely bordering on an oceanic climate (Cfb). The average annual temperature in Kruth is 8.6 °C (47.5 °F). The average annual rainfall is 2,001.4 mm (78.80 in) with December as the wettest month. The temperatures are highest on average in July, at around 17.3 °C (63.1 °F), and lowest in January, at around −0.4 °C (31.3 °F). The highest temperature ever recorded in Kruth was 37.3 °C (99.1 °F) on 24 July 2019; the coldest temperature ever recorded was −20.4 °C (−4.7 °F) on 24 December 2001.

Climate data for Kruth (1981–2010 averages, extremes 1996−present)
Month	Jan	Feb	Mar	Apr	May	Jun	Jul	Aug	Sep	Oct	Nov	Dec	Year
Record high °C (°F)	14.0 (57.2)	20.3 (68.5)	25.5 (77.9)	28.2 (82.8)	31.3 (88.3)	34.6 (94.3)	37.3 (99.1)	36.9 (98.4)	31.4 (88.5)	27.5 (81.5)	20.4 (68.7)	16.9 (62.4)	37.3 (99.1)
Mean daily maximum °C (°F)	2.4 (36.3)	4.4 (39.9)	8.5 (47.3)	13.5 (56.3)	18.1 (64.6)	22.0 (71.6)	22.7 (72.9)	22.5 (72.5)	18.1 (64.6)	13.2 (55.8)	6.7 (44.1)	2.5 (36.5)	12.9 (55.2)
Daily mean °C (°F)	−0.4 (31.3)	0.9 (33.6)	4.2 (39.6)	8.3 (46.9)	12.8 (55.0)	16.3 (61.3)	17.3 (63.1)	17.1 (62.8)	13.3 (55.9)	9.3 (48.7)	3.8 (38.8)	0.1 (32.2)	8.6 (47.5)
Mean daily minimum °C (°F)	−3.1 (26.4)	−2.7 (27.1)	−0.1 (31.8)	3.1 (37.6)	7.6 (45.7)	10.6 (51.1)	11.8 (53.2)	11.8 (53.2)	8.5 (47.3)	5.4 (41.7)	0.9 (33.6)	−2.3 (27.9)	4.3 (39.7)
Record low °C (°F)	−17.8 (0.0)	−20.1 (−4.2)	−18.7 (−1.7)	−7.1 (19.2)	−1.9 (28.6)	1.8 (35.2)	3.8 (38.8)	2.7 (36.9)	−2.0 (28.4)	−7.0 (19.4)	−13.6 (7.5)	−20.4 (−4.7)	−20.4 (−4.7)
Average precipitation mm (inches)	192.7 (7.59)	198.2 (7.80)	187.4 (7.38)	121.7 (4.79)	158.2 (6.23)	115.5 (4.55)	142.9 (5.63)	147.9 (5.82)	117.1 (4.61)	191.0 (7.52)	199.2 (7.84)	229.6 (9.04)	2,001.4 (78.80)
Average precipitation days (≥ 1.0 mm)	12.9	12.4	14.1	12.5	13.9	11.5	14.1	13.3	10.5	12.9	15.8	15.1	159.0
Source: Meteociel

== See also ==
- Communes of the Haut-Rhin département
