= Mollau =

Commune in Grand Est, France

- Commune
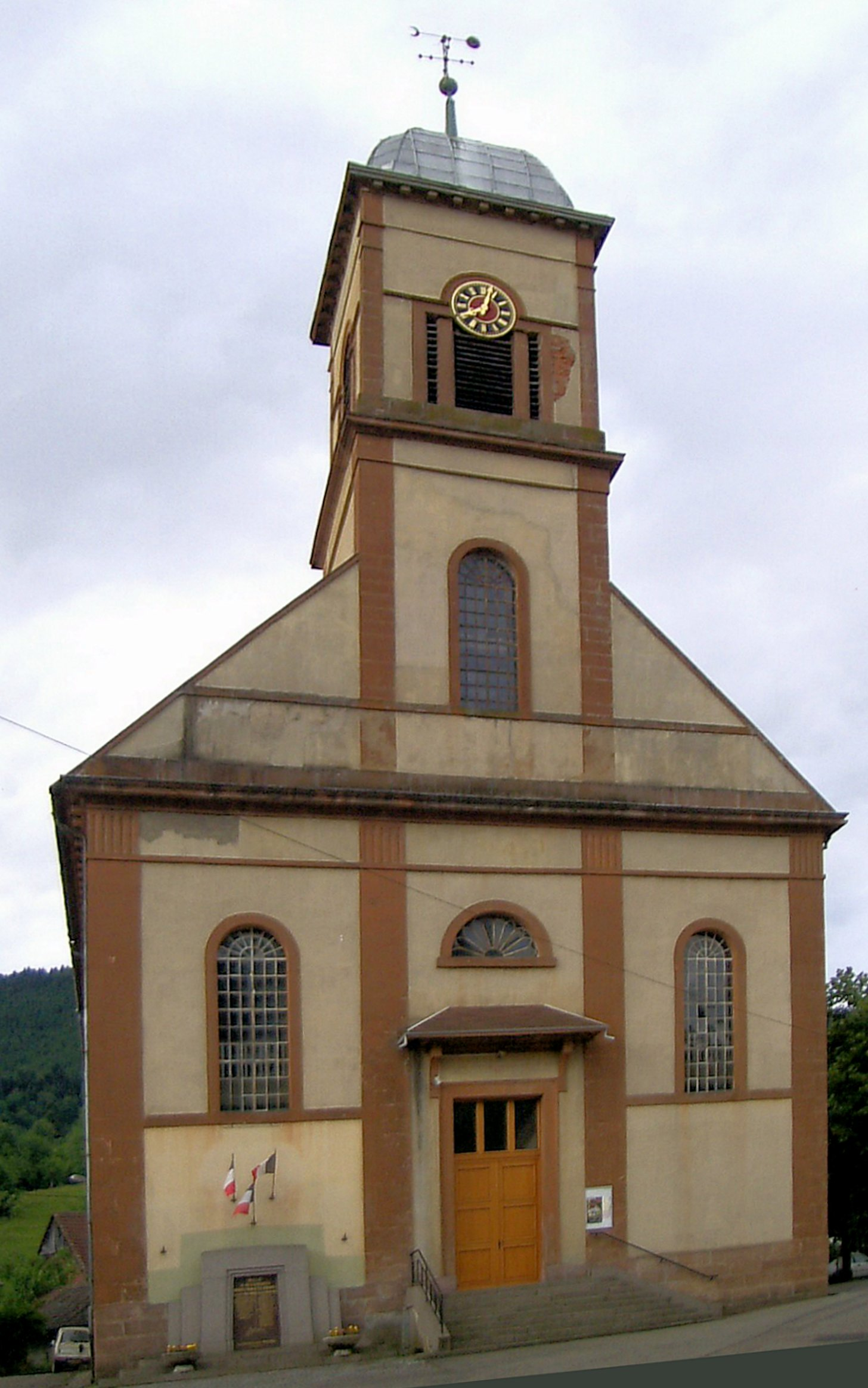
- The church in Mollau

- Coat of arms
- Location of Mollau
- Location within France Location within Grand Est
- Coordinates: 47°52′17″N 6°58′25″E
- Country: France
- Region: Grand Est
- Department: Haut-Rhin
- Arrondissement: Thann-Guebwiller
- Canton: Cernay
- Intercommunality: Vallée de Saint-Amarin

Government
  - Mayor (2020–2026): Frédéric Caquel
- Area^{1}: 8.82 km^{2} (3.41 sq mi)
- Elevation: 470 m (1,540 ft)
- Highest elevation: 1,195 m (3,921 ft)
- Lowest elevation: 452 m (1,483 ft)
- Population (2023): 331
  - Density: 37.5/km^{2} (97.2/sq mi)
- Time zone: UTC+01:00 (CET)
  - Summer (DST): UTC+02:00 (CEST)
- INSEE/Postal code: 68213 /68470
- ^{1} French Land Register data, which excludes lakes, ponds, glaciers > 1 km^{2} (0.386 sq mi or 247 acres) and river estuaries.

Mollau (French pronunciation: [mɔlo]) is a commune in the Haut-Rhin department in Grand Est in north-eastern France.

== See also ==
- Communes of the Haut-Rhin département
