= Mitzach =

Commune in Grand Est, France

- Commune
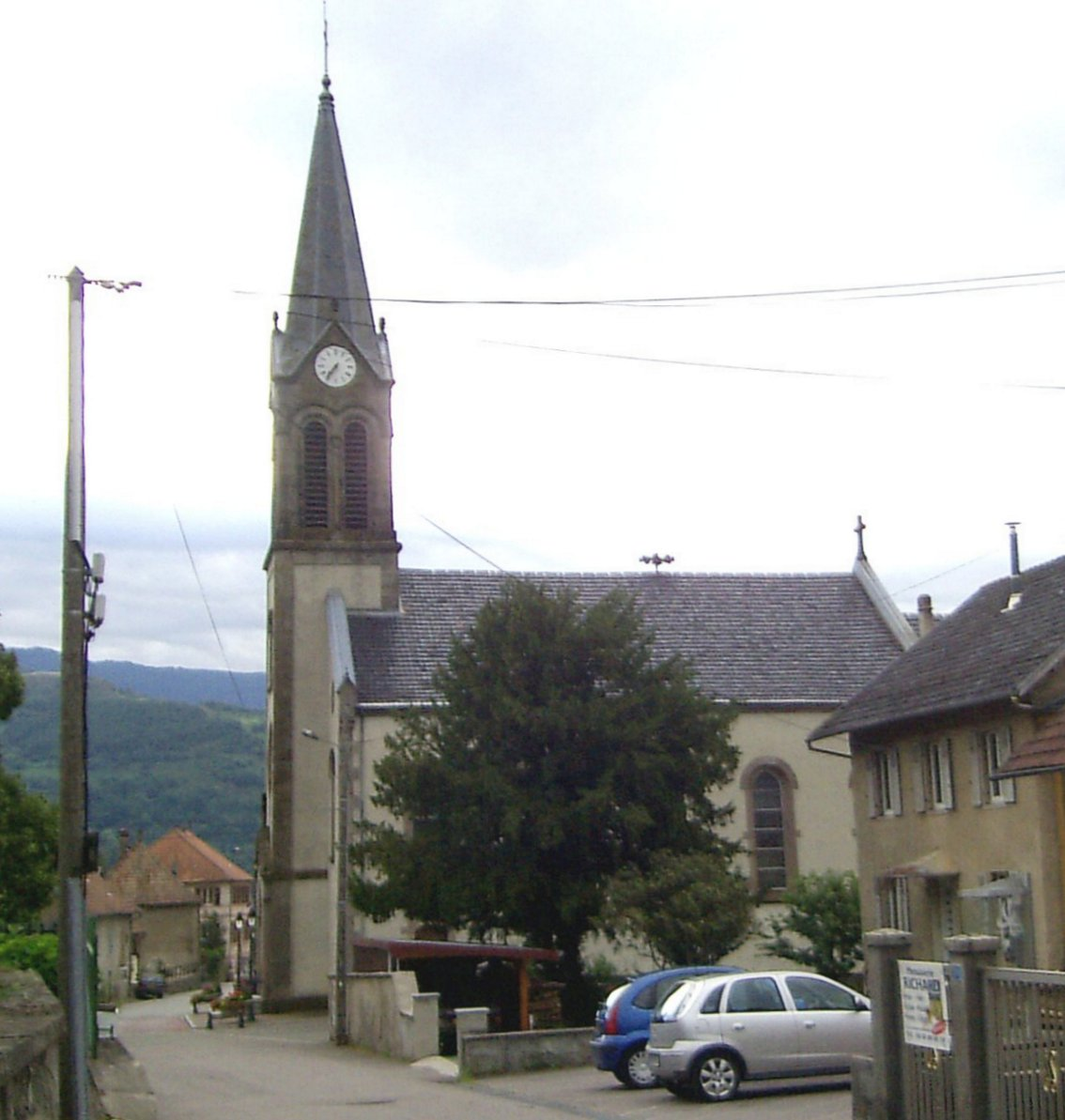
- The church in Mitzach

- Coat of arms
- Location of Mitzach
- Location within France Location within Grand Est
- Coordinates: 47°52′16″N 7°00′18″E
- Country: France
- Region: Grand Est
- Department: Haut-Rhin
- Arrondissement: Thann-Guebwiller
- Canton: Cernay
- Intercommunality: Vallée de Saint-Amarin

Government
  - Mayor (2020–2026): Roger Georges Bringard
- Area^{1}: 6.41 km^{2} (2.47 sq mi)
- Elevation: 440 m (1,440 ft)
- Highest elevation: 1,050 m (3,440 ft)
- Lowest elevation: 410 m (1,350 ft)
- Population (2023): 374
  - Density: 58.3/km^{2} (151/sq mi)
- Time zone: UTC+01:00 (CET)
  - Summer (DST): UTC+02:00 (CEST)
- INSEE/Postal code: 68211 /68470
- ^{1} French Land Register data, which excludes lakes, ponds, glaciers > 1 km^{2} (0.386 sq mi or 247 acres) and river estuaries.

Mitzach (French pronunciation: [mitsak] or French pronunciation: [mitsax]) is a commune in the Haut-Rhin department in Grand Est in north-eastern France.

== See also ==
- Communes of the Haut-Rhin département
- Château de Stoerenbourg
