= Aspach-le-Bas =

Commune in Grand Est, France

- Commune
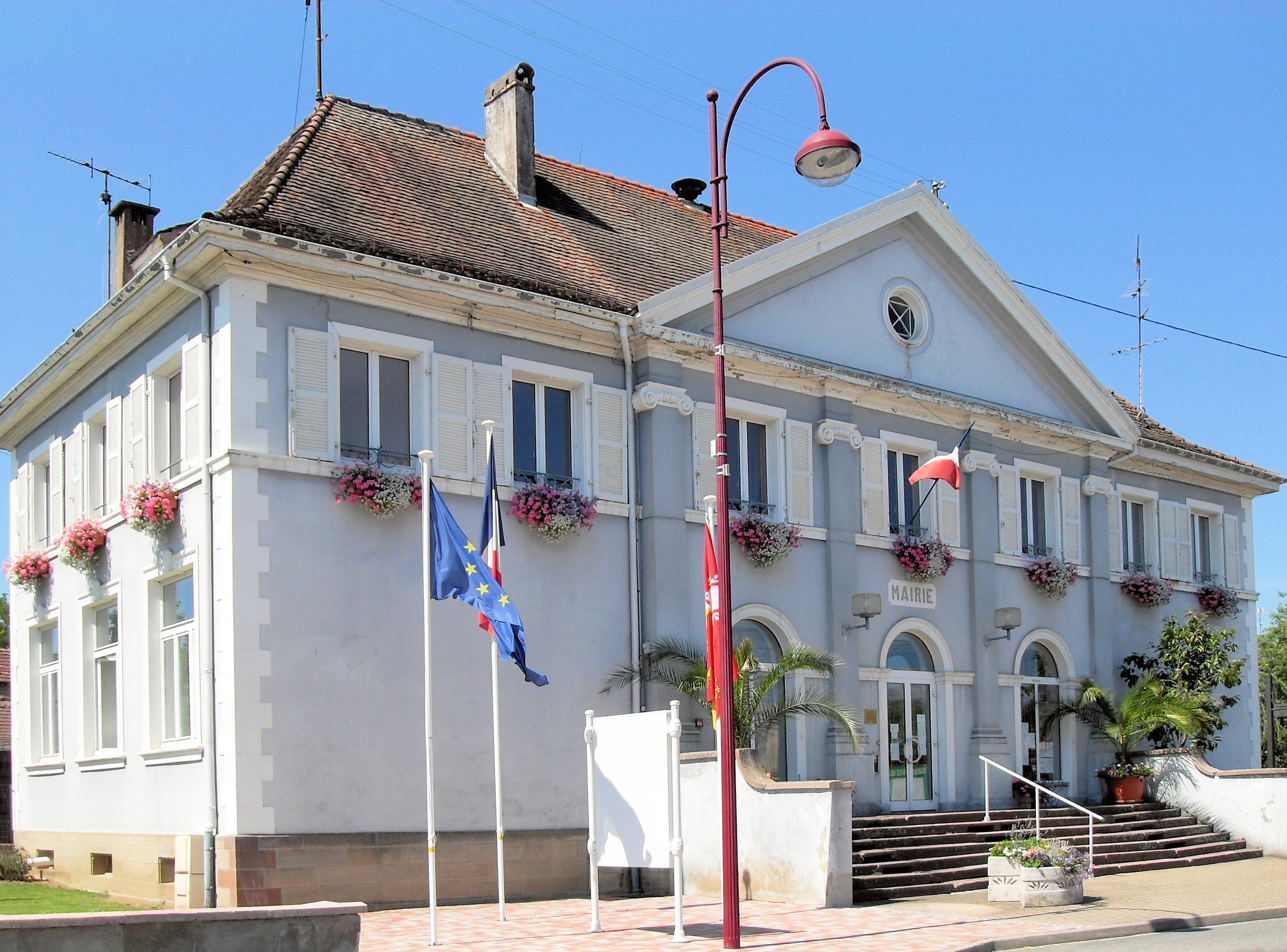
- The town hall in Aspach-le-Bas

- Coat of arms
- Location of Aspach-le-Bas
- Location within France Location within Grand Est
- Coordinates: 47°45′45″N 7°09′05″E
- Country: France
- Region: Grand Est
- Department: Haut-Rhin
- Arrondissement: Thann-Guebwiller
- Canton: Cernay
- Intercommunality: CC Thann-Cernay

Government
  - Mayor (2020–2026): Maurice Lemblé
- Area^{1}: 0.80 km^{2} (0.31 sq mi)
- Elevation: 290 m (950 ft)
- Highest elevation: 340 m (1,120 ft)
- Lowest elevation: 289 m (948 ft)
- Population (2023): 1,262
  - Density: 1,600/km^{2} (4,100/sq mi)
- Time zone: UTC+01:00 (CET)
  - Summer (DST): UTC+02:00 (CEST)
- INSEE/Postal code: 68011 /68700
- ^{1} French Land Register data, which excludes lakes, ponds, glaciers > 1 km^{2} (0.386 sq mi or 247 acres) and river estuaries.

Aspach-le-Bas (French pronunciation: [aspak lə ba]; German: Niederaspach; Alsatian: Nìderàschbàch) is a commune in the Haut-Rhin department in Grand Est in north-eastern France.

== See also ==
- Communes of the Haut-Rhin department
