= Dolleren =

Commune in Grand Est, France

- Commune
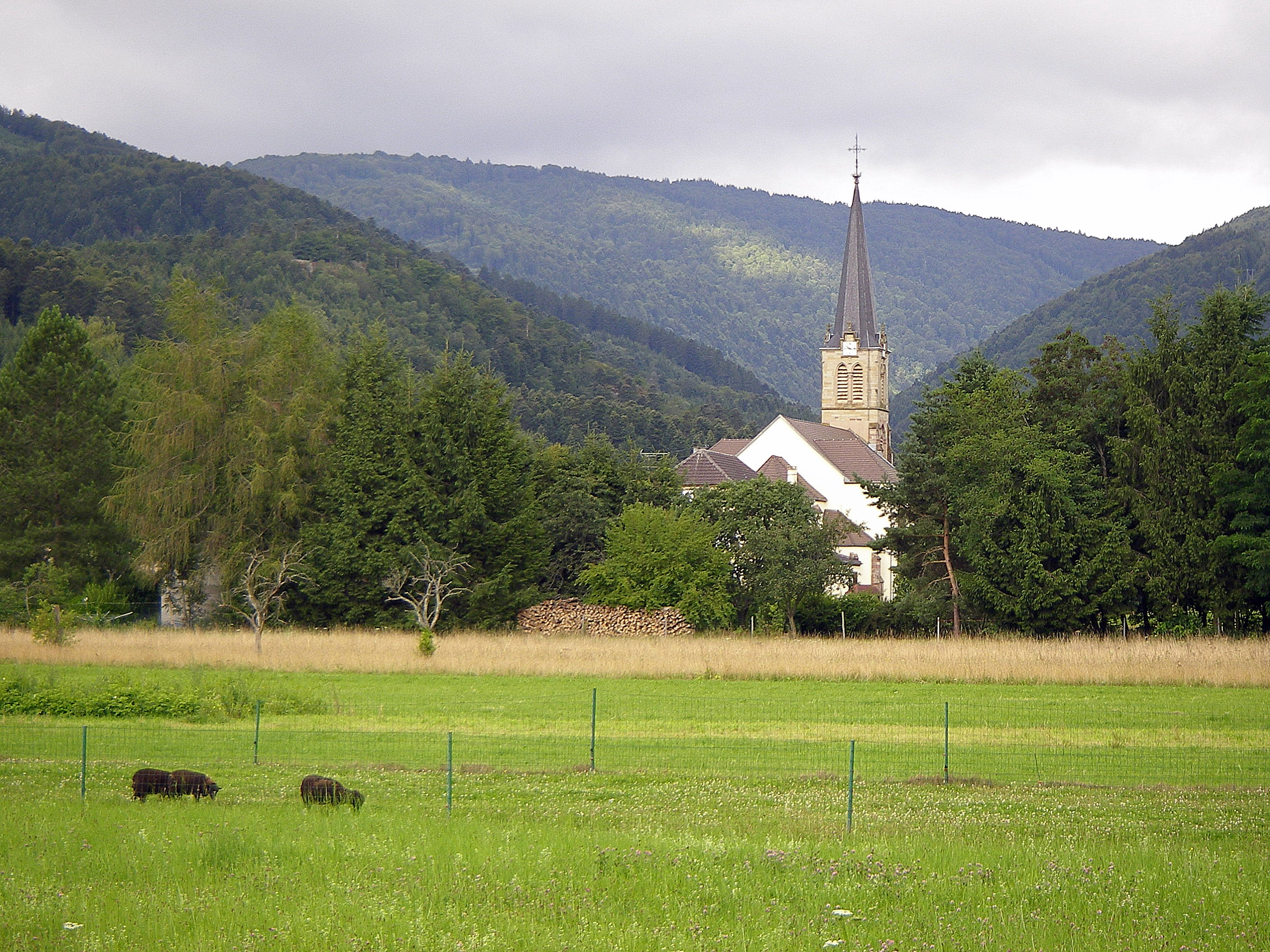
- A general view of Dolleren

- Coat of arms
- Location of Dolleren
- Location within France Location within Grand Est
- Coordinates: 47°48′24″N 6°55′57″E
- Country: France
- Region: Grand Est
- Department: Haut-Rhin
- Arrondissement: Thann-Guebwiller
- Canton: Masevaux-Niederbruck
- Intercommunality: Vallée de la Doller et du Soultzbach

Government
  - Mayor (2020–2026): Sébastien Reymann
- Area^{1}: 8.37 km^{2} (3.23 sq mi)
- Elevation: 471 m (1,545 ft)
- Highest elevation: 1,075 m (3,527 ft)
- Lowest elevation: 458 m (1,503 ft)
- Population (2023): 449
  - Density: 53.6/km^{2} (139/sq mi)
- Time zone: UTC+01:00 (CET)
  - Summer (DST): UTC+02:00 (CEST)
- INSEE/Postal code: 68073 /68290
- ^{1} French Land Register data, which excludes lakes, ponds, glaciers > 1 km^{2} (0.386 sq mi or 247 acres) and river estuaries.

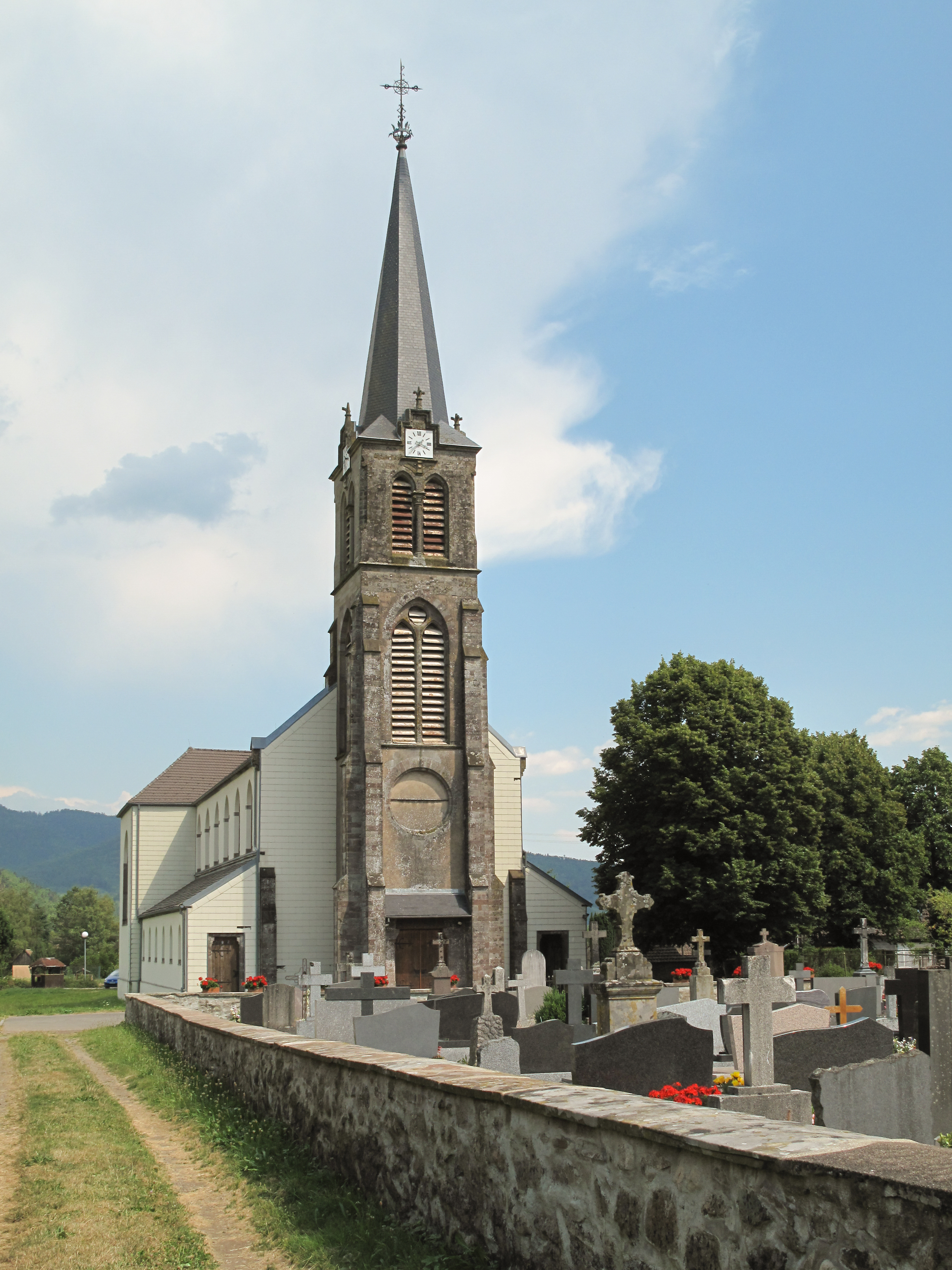
Dolleren, church: l'église de l'Exaltation-de-la-Sainte-Croix

Dolleren (French pronunciation: [dɔləʁən]; German: Dollern) is a commune in the Haut-Rhin department in Grand Est in north-eastern France.

== See also ==
- Communes of the Haut-Rhin department
