= Bourbach-le-Haut =

Commune in Grand Est, France

- Commune
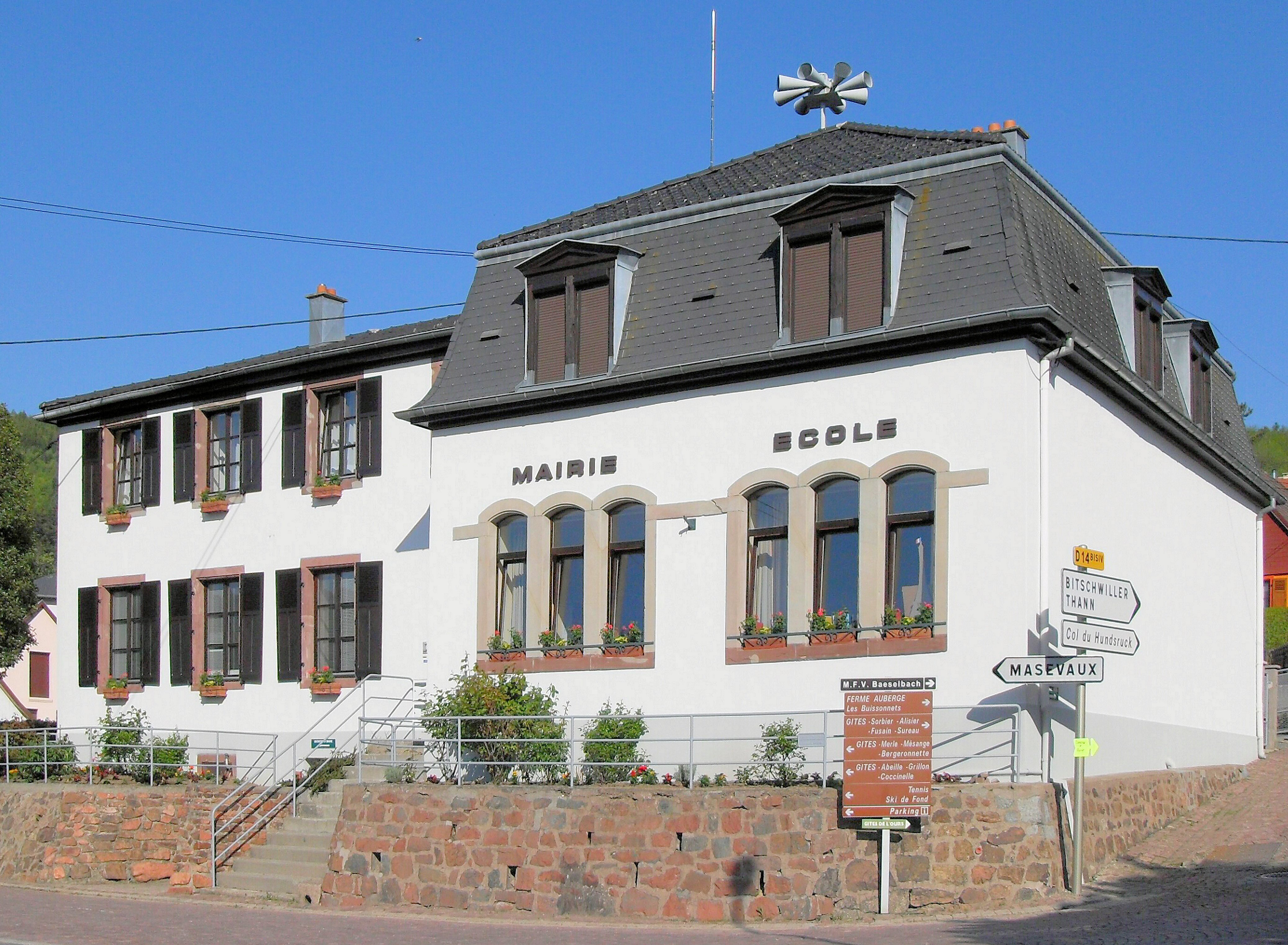
- The town hall and school in Bourbach-le-Haut

- Coat of arms
- Location of Bourbach-le-Haut
- Location within France Location within Grand Est
- Coordinates: 47°47′47″N 7°01′50″E
- Country: France
- Region: Grand Est
- Department: Haut-Rhin
- Arrondissement: Thann-Guebwiller
- Canton: Cernay

Government
  - Mayor (2020–2026): Joël Mansuy
- Area^{1}: 6.86 km^{2} (2.65 sq mi)
- Elevation: 580 m (1,900 ft)
- Highest elevation: 1,183 m (3,881 ft)
- Lowest elevation: 439 m (1,440 ft)
- Population (2023): 408
  - Density: 59.5/km^{2} (154/sq mi)
- Time zone: UTC+01:00 (CET)
  - Summer (DST): UTC+02:00 (CEST)
- INSEE/Postal code: 68046 /68290
- ^{1} French Land Register data, which excludes lakes, ponds, glaciers > 1 km^{2} (0.386 sq mi or 247 acres) and river estuaries.

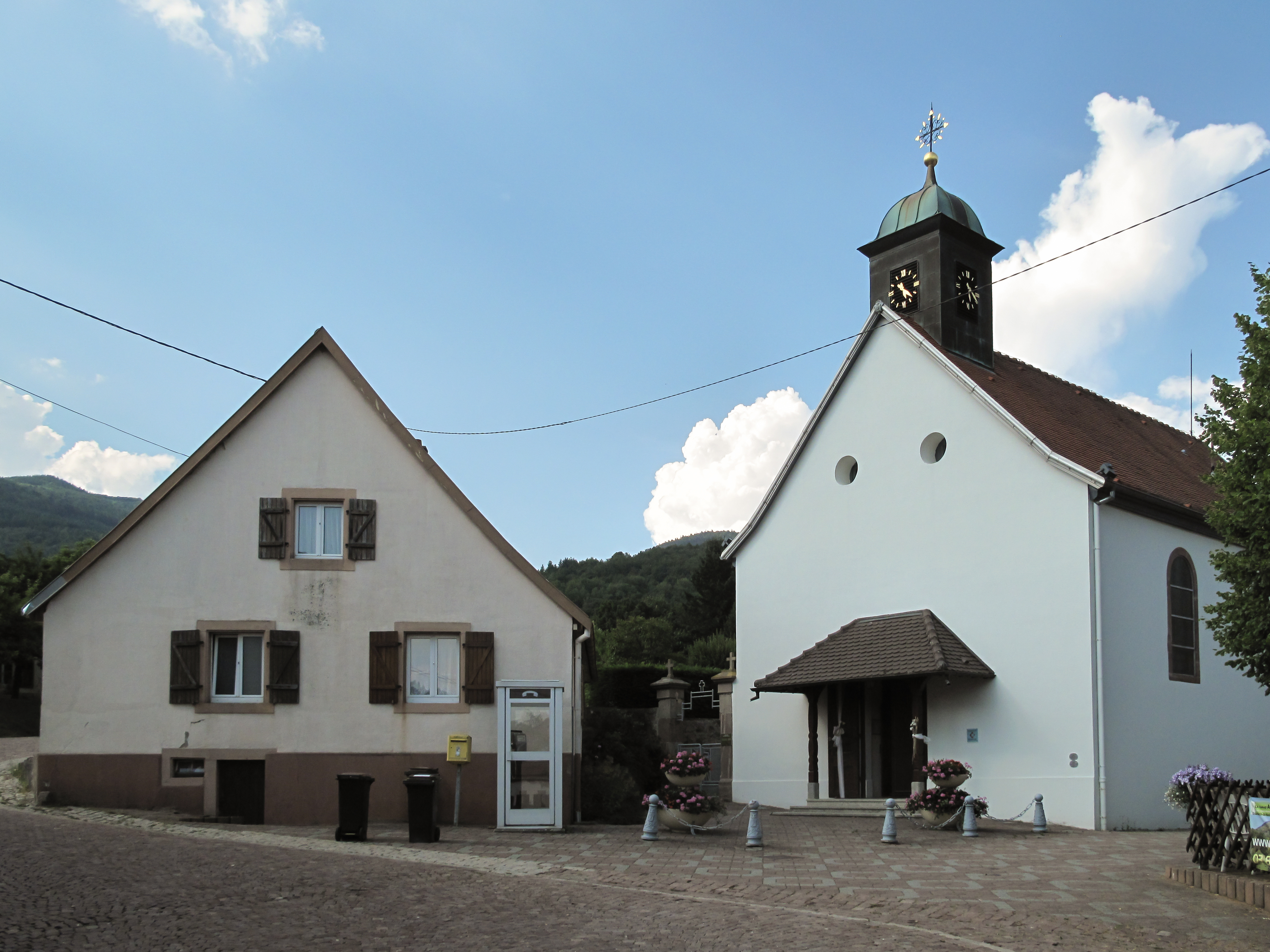
Bourbach le Haut, l'église Saint-Michel

Bourbach-le-Haut (French pronunciation: [buʁbak lə o]; German: Oberburbach) is a commune in the Haut-Rhin department in Grand Est in north-eastern France.

== See also ==
- Communes of the Haut-Rhin department
