= Oberbruck =

Commune in Grand Est, France

- Commune
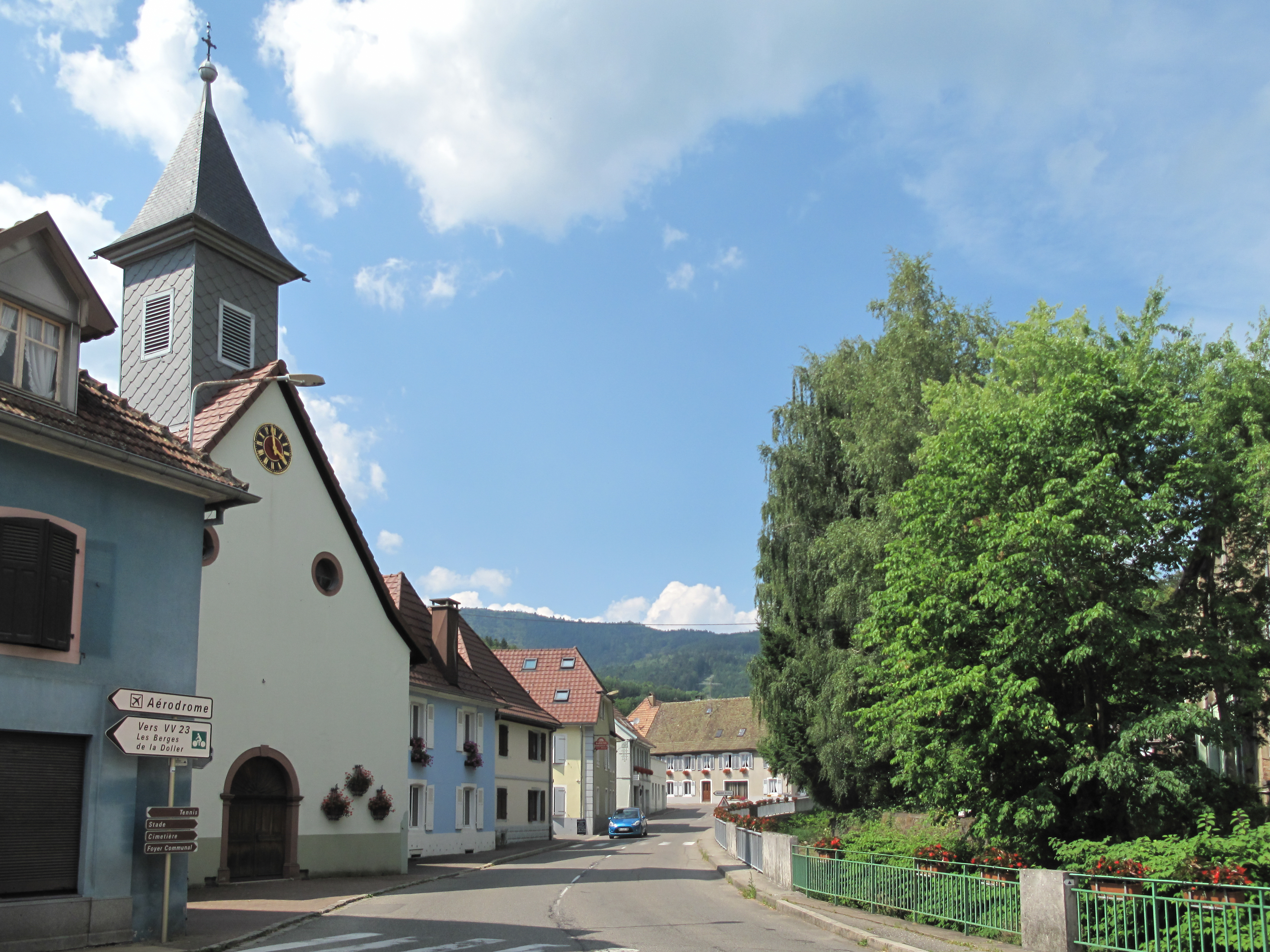
- The church in Oberbruck

- Coat of arms
- Location of Oberbruck
- Location within France Location within Grand Est
- Coordinates: 47°48′36″N 6°56′36″E
- Country: France
- Region: Grand Est
- Department: Haut-Rhin
- Arrondissement: Thann-Guebwiller
- Canton: Masevaux-Niederbruck
- Intercommunality: Vallée de la Doller et du Soultzbach

Government
  - Mayor (2020–2026): Jacques Behra
- Area^{1}: 4.3 km^{2} (1.7 sq mi)
- Elevation: 460 m (1,510 ft)
- Highest elevation: 1,120 m (3,670 ft)
- Lowest elevation: 455 m (1,493 ft)
- Population (2023): 380
  - Density: 88/km^{2} (230/sq mi)
- Time zone: UTC+01:00 (CET)
  - Summer (DST): UTC+02:00 (CEST)
- INSEE/Postal code: 68239 /68290
- ^{1} French Land Register data, which excludes lakes, ponds, glaciers > 1 km^{2} (0.386 sq mi or 247 acres) and river estuaries.

Oberbruck (French pronunciation: [obəʁbʁyk]) is a commune in the Haut-Rhin department in Grand Est in north-eastern France.

== Population ==
Historical population
Year	Pop.	±% p.a.
1968	548	—
1975	506	−1.13%
1982	439	−2.01%
1990	462	+0.64%
1999	475	+0.31%
2007	443	−0.87%
2012	428	−0.69%
2017	393	−1.69%
2023	380	−0.56%
Source: INSEE

== See also ==
- Communes of the Haut-Rhin department
