= Cernay, Haut-Rhin =

Commune in Grand Est, France

Cernay Sanna (Alsatian)
- Commune
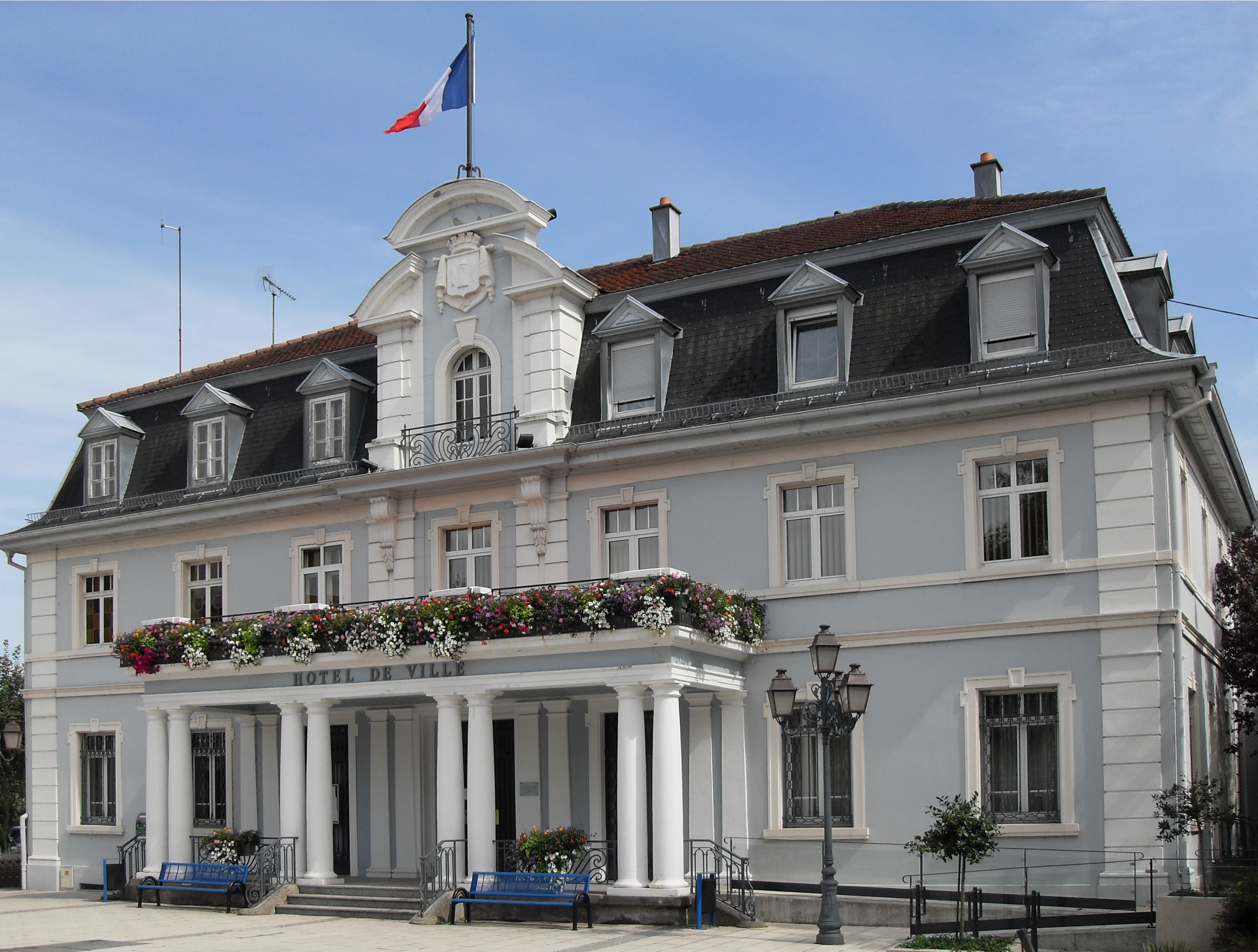
- The town hall

- Coat of arms
- Location of Cernay
- Location within France Location within Grand Est
- Coordinates: 47°49′N 7°11′E
- Country: France
- Region: Grand Est
- Department: Haut-Rhin
- Arrondissement: Thann-Guebwiller
- Canton: Cernay
- Intercommunality: Thann-Cernay

Government
  - Mayor (2020–2026): Michel Sordi (LR)
- Area^{1}: 18.04 km^{2} (6.97 sq mi)
- Elevation: 295 m (968 ft)
- Highest elevation: 358 m (1,175 ft)
- Lowest elevation: 277 m (909 ft)
- Population (2023): 12,057
  - Density: 668.3/km^{2} (1,731/sq mi)
- Time zone: UTC+01:00 (CET)
  - Summer (DST): UTC+02:00 (CEST)
- INSEE/Postal code: 68063 /68700
- ^{1} French Land Register data, which excludes lakes, ponds, glaciers > 1 km^{2} (0.386 sq mi or 247 acres) and river estuaries.

Cernay (French pronunciation: [sɛʁnɛ]; Alsatian: Sanna) is a commune in the Haut-Rhin department in Grand Est in north-eastern France.

It is situated on the river Thur, 17 km northwest of Mulhouse.

== Second World War ==
The SS had an "ideology school" for their soldiers, where "race theory" was part of the curriculum.

== Population ==
Historical population
Year	Pop.	±% p.a.
1968	8,563	—
1975	9,342	+1.25%
1982	10,208	+1.27%
1990	10,313	+0.13%
1999	10,446	+0.14%
2007	11,118	+0.78%
2012	11,398	+0.50%
2017	11,565	+0.29%
2023	12,057	+0.70%
Source: INSEE

== See also ==
- Communes of the Haut-Rhin department
