= Geishouse =

Commune in Grand Est, France

- Commune
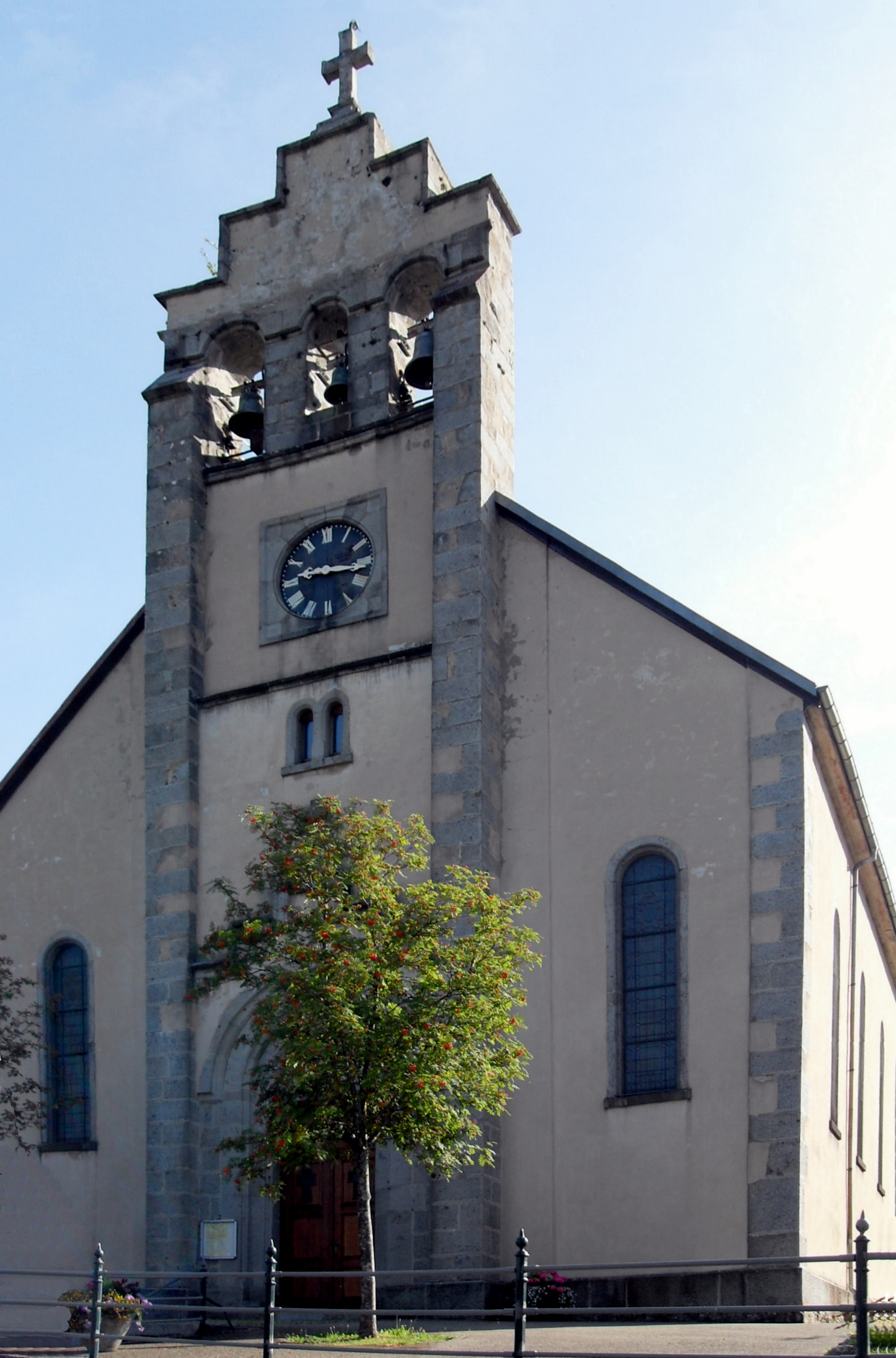
- The church in Geishouse

- Coat of arms
- Location of Geishouse
- Location within France Location within Grand Est
- Coordinates: 47°53′02″N 7°03′39″E
- Country: France
- Region: Grand Est
- Department: Haut-Rhin
- Arrondissement: Thann-Guebwiller
- Canton: Cernay
- Intercommunality: Vallée de Saint-Amarin

Government
  - Mayor (2020–2026): Claude Kirchhoffer
- Area^{1}: 7.28 km^{2} (2.81 sq mi)
- Elevation: 730 m (2,400 ft)
- Highest elevation: 1,422 m (4,665 ft)
- Lowest elevation: 510 m (1,670 ft)
- Population (2023): 424
  - Density: 58.2/km^{2} (151/sq mi)
- Time zone: UTC+01:00 (CET)
  - Summer (DST): UTC+02:00 (CEST)
- INSEE/Postal code: 68102 /68690
- ^{1} French Land Register data, which excludes lakes, ponds, glaciers > 1 km^{2} (0.386 sq mi or 247 acres) and river estuaries.

Geishouse (French pronunciation: [ɡaisuz]; German: Geishausen; Alsatian: Gaishüse) is a commune in the Haut-Rhin department in Grand Est in north-eastern France.

== Geography ==
=== Climate ===
Geishouse has an oceanic climate (Köppen climate classification Cfb). The average annual temperature in Geishouse is 9.0 °C (48.2 °F). The average annual rainfall is 1,405.6 mm (55.34 in) with December as the wettest month. The temperatures are highest on average in July, at around 17.8 °C (64.0 °F), and lowest in January, at around 0.6 °C (33.1 °F). The highest temperature ever recorded in Geishouse was 36.8 °C (98.2 °F) on 24 July 2019; the coldest temperature ever recorded was −23.6 °C (−10.5 °F) on 9 January 1985.

Climate data for Geishouse (1981–2010 averages, extremes 1965−present)
Month	Jan	Feb	Mar	Apr	May	Jun	Jul	Aug	Sep	Oct	Nov	Dec	Year
Record high °C (°F)	19.0 (66.2)	20.3 (68.5)	24.8 (76.6)	26.7 (80.1)	30.5 (86.9)	34.8 (94.6)	36.8 (98.2)	36.7 (98.1)	31.2 (88.2)	27.6 (81.7)	21.6 (70.9)	17.7 (63.9)	36.8 (98.2)
Mean daily maximum °C (°F)	3.4 (38.1)	4.4 (39.9)	7.9 (46.2)	11.9 (53.4)	16.6 (61.9)	19.9 (67.8)	22.4 (72.3)	22.2 (72.0)	18.1 (64.6)	13.6 (56.5)	7.4 (45.3)	4.1 (39.4)	12.7 (54.9)
Daily mean °C (°F)	0.6 (33.1)	1.3 (34.3)	4.5 (40.1)	7.9 (46.2)	12.3 (54.1)	15.4 (59.7)	17.8 (64.0)	17.6 (63.7)	13.9 (57.0)	10.0 (50.0)	4.5 (40.1)	1.5 (34.7)	9.0 (48.2)
Mean daily minimum °C (°F)	−2.2 (28.0)	−1.8 (28.8)	1.1 (34.0)	4.0 (39.2)	8.1 (46.6)	10.8 (51.4)	13.1 (55.6)	13.0 (55.4)	9.8 (49.6)	6.4 (43.5)	1.7 (35.1)	−1.1 (30.0)	5.3 (41.5)
Record low °C (°F)	−23.6 (−10.5)	−17.4 (0.7)	−16.0 (3.2)	−8.4 (16.9)	−4.3 (24.3)	1.0 (33.8)	3.0 (37.4)	3.0 (37.4)	1.8 (35.2)	−4.9 (23.2)	−11.8 (10.8)	−17.0 (1.4)	−23.6 (−10.5)
Average precipitation mm (inches)	141.0 (5.55)	119.8 (4.72)	113.8 (4.48)	84.9 (3.34)	116.2 (4.57)	105.9 (4.17)	114.9 (4.52)	98.6 (3.88)	101.4 (3.99)	129.6 (5.10)	120.7 (4.75)	158.8 (6.25)	1,405.6 (55.34)
Average precipitation days (≥ 1.0 mm)	13.5	12.4	13.4	12.5	14.2	12.8	12.4	11.7	10.4	12.8	13.3	14.9	154.1
Mean monthly sunshine hours	71.6	88.4	130.7	150.9	177.0	194.7	214.8	222.2	153.6	113.2	75.1	54.8	1,646.9
Source: Météo France

== Population ==
Historical population
Year	Pop.	±% p.a.
1968	402	—
1975	352	−1.88%
1982	376	+0.95%
1990	423	+1.48%
1999	472	+1.23%
2007	481	+0.24%
2012	478	−0.13%
2017	441	−1.60%
2023	424	−0.65%
Source: INSEE

== See also ==
- Communes of the Haut-Rhin département
