= Soppe-le-Bas =

Commune in Grand Est, France

- Commune
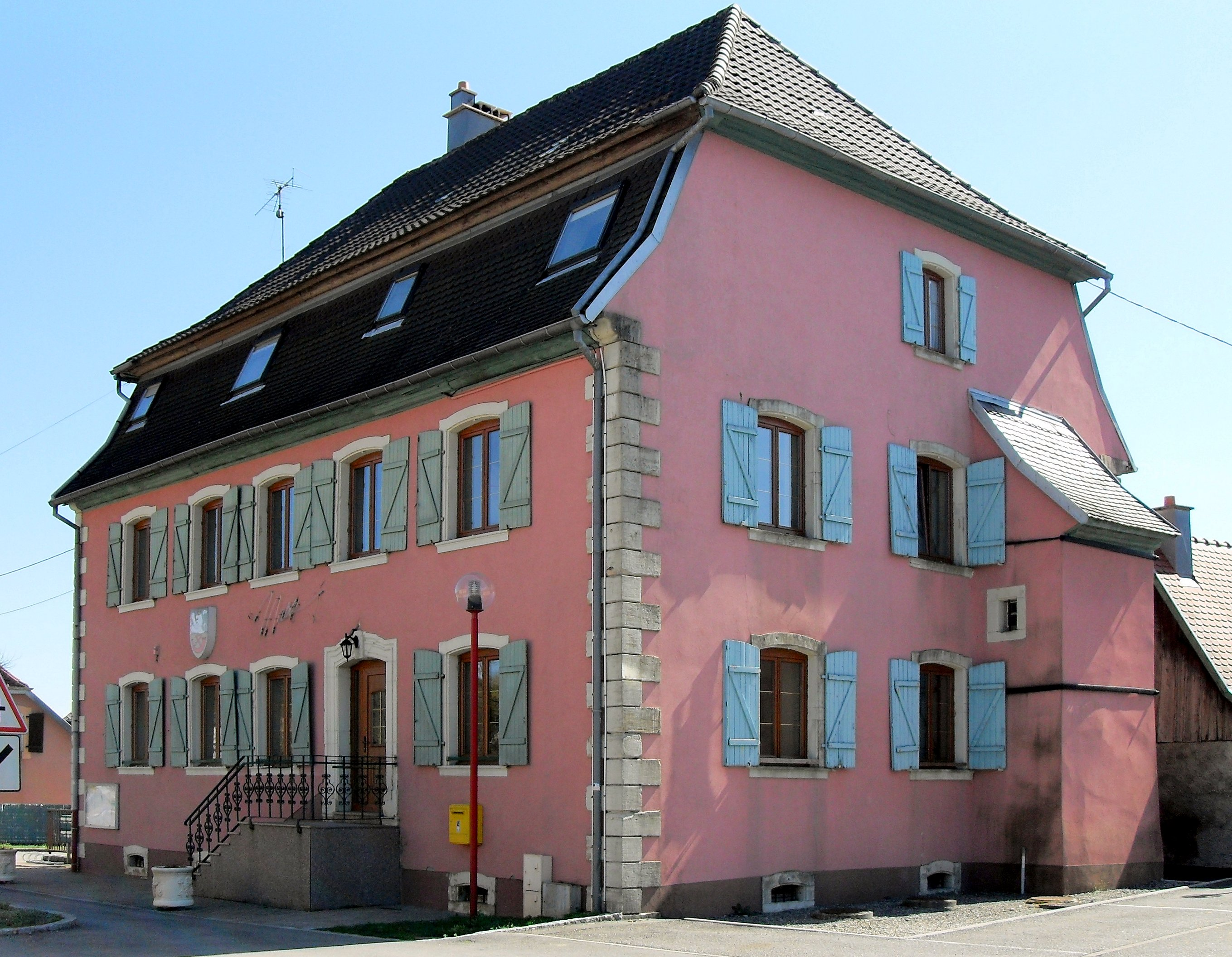
- The town hall in Soppe-le-Bas

- Coat of arms
- Location of Soppe-le-Bas
- Location within France Location within Grand Est
- Coordinates: 47°43′05″N 7°05′25″E
- Country: France
- Region: Grand Est
- Department: Haut-Rhin
- Arrondissement: Thann-Guebwiller
- Canton: Masevaux-Niederbruck
- Intercommunality: Vallée de la Doller et du Soultzbach

Government
  - Mayor (2020–2026): Jean-Julien Weiss
- Area^{1}: 5.68 km^{2} (2.19 sq mi)
- Elevation: 320 m (1,050 ft)
- Highest elevation: 380 m (1,250 ft)
- Lowest elevation: 297 m (974 ft)
- Population (2023): 774
  - Density: 136/km^{2} (353/sq mi)
- Time zone: UTC+01:00 (CET)
  - Summer (DST): UTC+02:00 (CEST)
- INSEE/Postal code: 68313 /68780
- ^{1} French Land Register data, which excludes lakes, ponds, glaciers > 1 km^{2} (0.386 sq mi or 247 acres) and river estuaries.

Soppe-le-Bas (French pronunciation: [sɔp lə ba]; German: Niedersulzbach; Alsatian: Needersulzbàch) is a commune in the Haut-Rhin department in Grand Est in north-eastern France.

== See also ==
- Communes of the Haut-Rhin department
