= Storckensohn =

Commune in Grand Est, France

- Commune
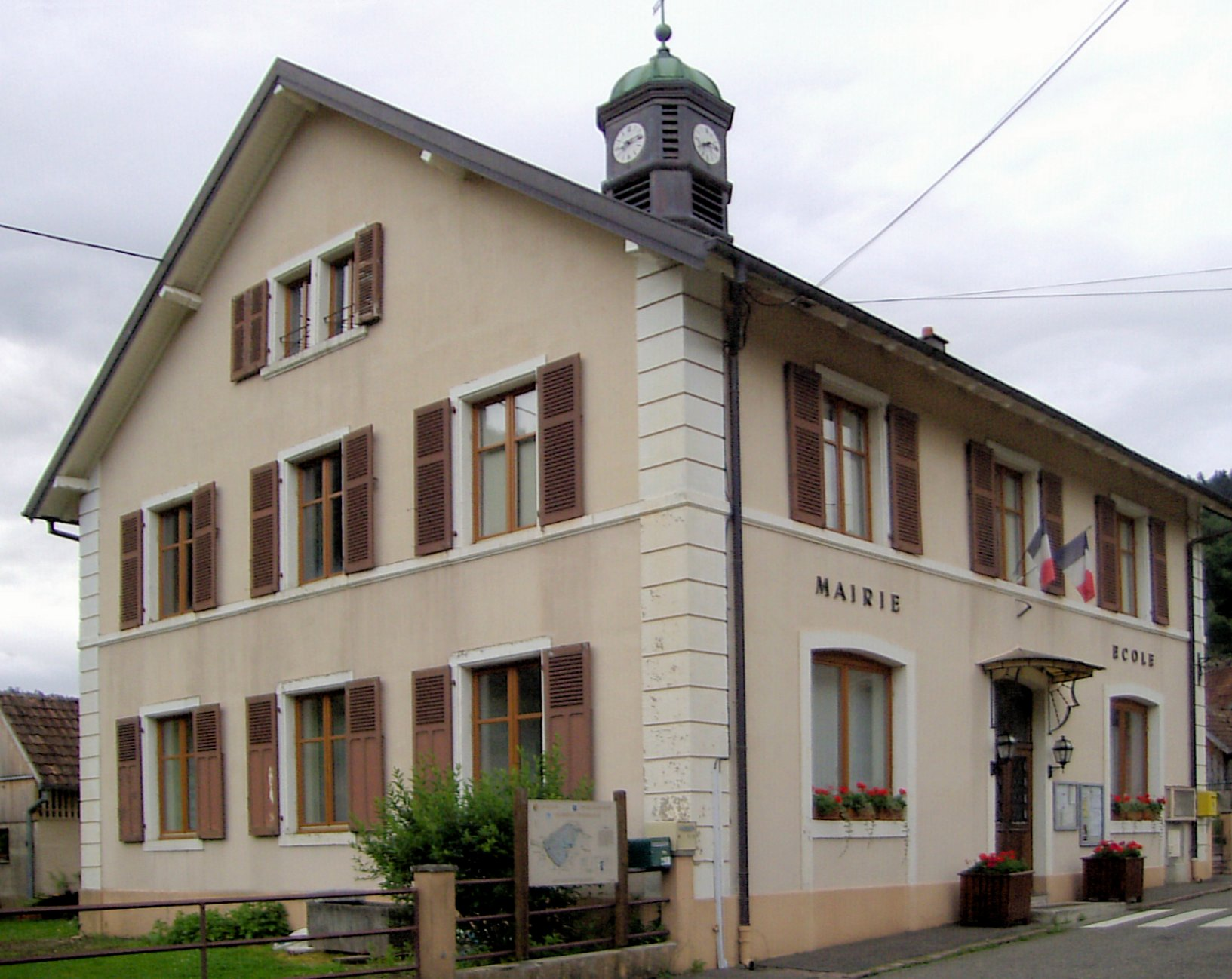
- The town hall and school in Storckensohn

- Coat of arms
- Location of Storckensohn
- Location within France Location within Grand Est
- Coordinates: 47°52′46″N 6°57′30″E
- Country: France
- Region: Grand Est
- Department: Haut-Rhin
- Arrondissement: Thann-Guebwiller
- Canton: Cernay
- Intercommunality: Vallée de Saint-Amarin

Government
  - Mayor (2020–2026): Jacques Karcher
- Area^{1}: 5.1 km^{2} (2.0 sq mi)
- Elevation: 509 m (1,670 ft)
- Highest elevation: 1,220 m (4,000 ft)
- Lowest elevation: 470 m (1,540 ft)
- Population (2023): 184
  - Density: 36/km^{2} (93/sq mi)
- Time zone: UTC+01:00 (CET)
  - Summer (DST): UTC+02:00 (CEST)
- INSEE/Postal code: 68328 /68470
- ^{1} French Land Register data, which excludes lakes, ponds, glaciers > 1 km^{2} (0.386 sq mi or 247 acres) and river estuaries.

Storckensohn (German: Storchensohn) is a commune in the Haut-Rhin department in Grand Est in north-eastern France.

== Watermill ==
The restored overshot waterwheel

The watermill in Storckensohn dates from around 1820 and was used to grind oil-bearing seeds. It was restored in 1991.

== See also ==
- Communes of the Haut-Rhin department
