= Moosch =

Commune in Grand Est, France

- Commune
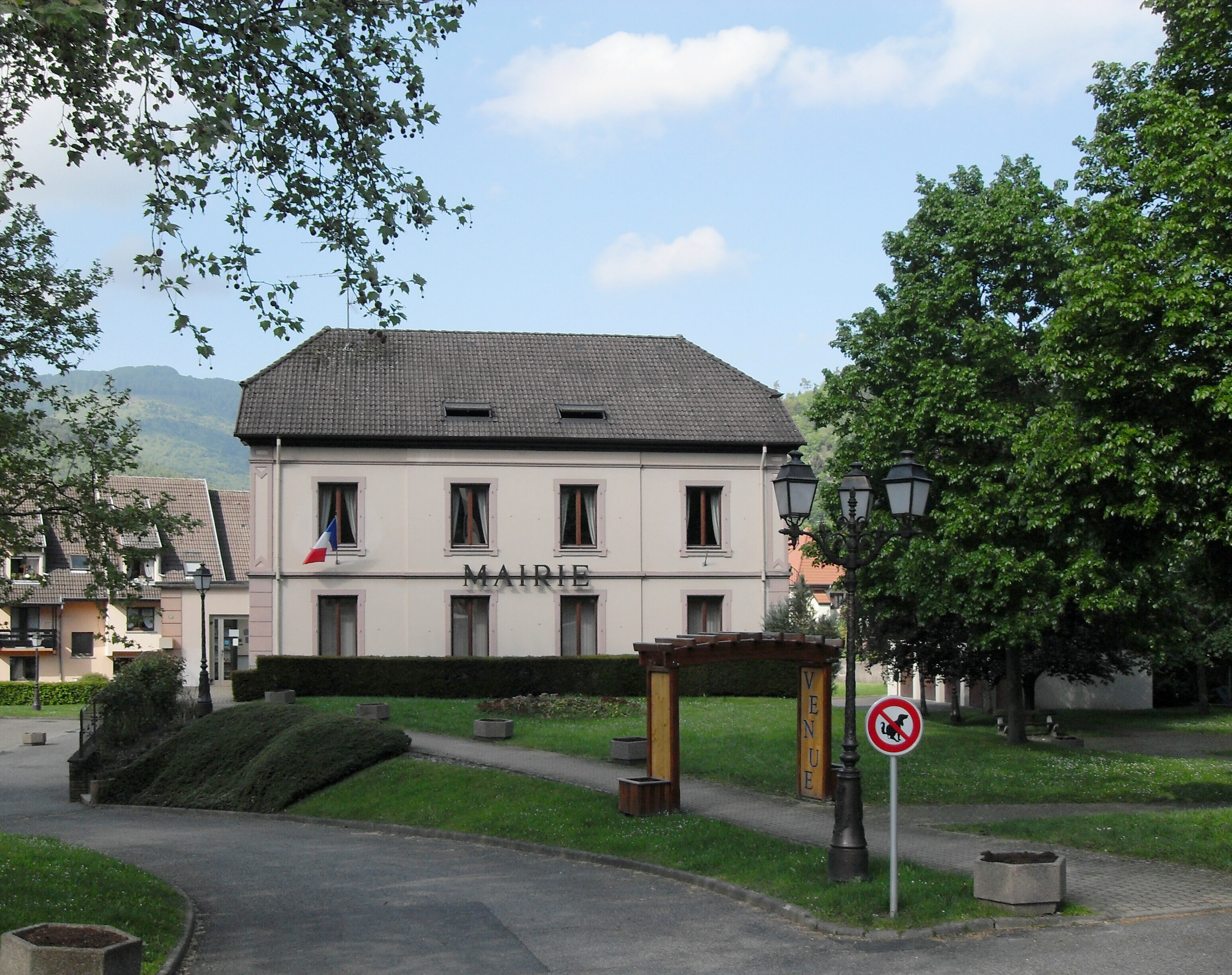
- The town hall in Moosch

- Coat of arms
- Location of Moosch
- Location within France Location within Grand Est
- Coordinates: 47°51′38″N 7°03′03″E
- Country: France
- Region: Grand Est
- Department: Haut-Rhin
- Arrondissement: Thann-Guebwiller
- Canton: Cernay
- Intercommunality: Vallée de Saint-Amarin

Government
  - Mayor (2020–2026): José Schruoffeneger
- Area^{1}: 15.25 km^{2} (5.89 sq mi)
- Elevation: 388 m (1,273 ft)
- Highest elevation: 1,190 m (3,900 ft)
- Lowest elevation: 375 m (1,230 ft)
- Population (2023): 1,595
  - Density: 104.6/km^{2} (270.9/sq mi)
- Time zone: UTC+01:00 (CET)
  - Summer (DST): UTC+02:00 (CEST)
- INSEE/Postal code: 68217 /68690
- ^{1} French Land Register data, which excludes lakes, ponds, glaciers > 1 km^{2} (0.386 sq mi or 247 acres) and river estuaries.

Moosch (French pronunciation: [moʃ]) is a commune in the Haut-Rhin department in Grand Est in north-eastern France.

== See also ==
- Communes of the Haut-Rhin département
