= Wegscheid, Haut-Rhin =

Commune in Grand Est, France

Wegscheid
- Commune
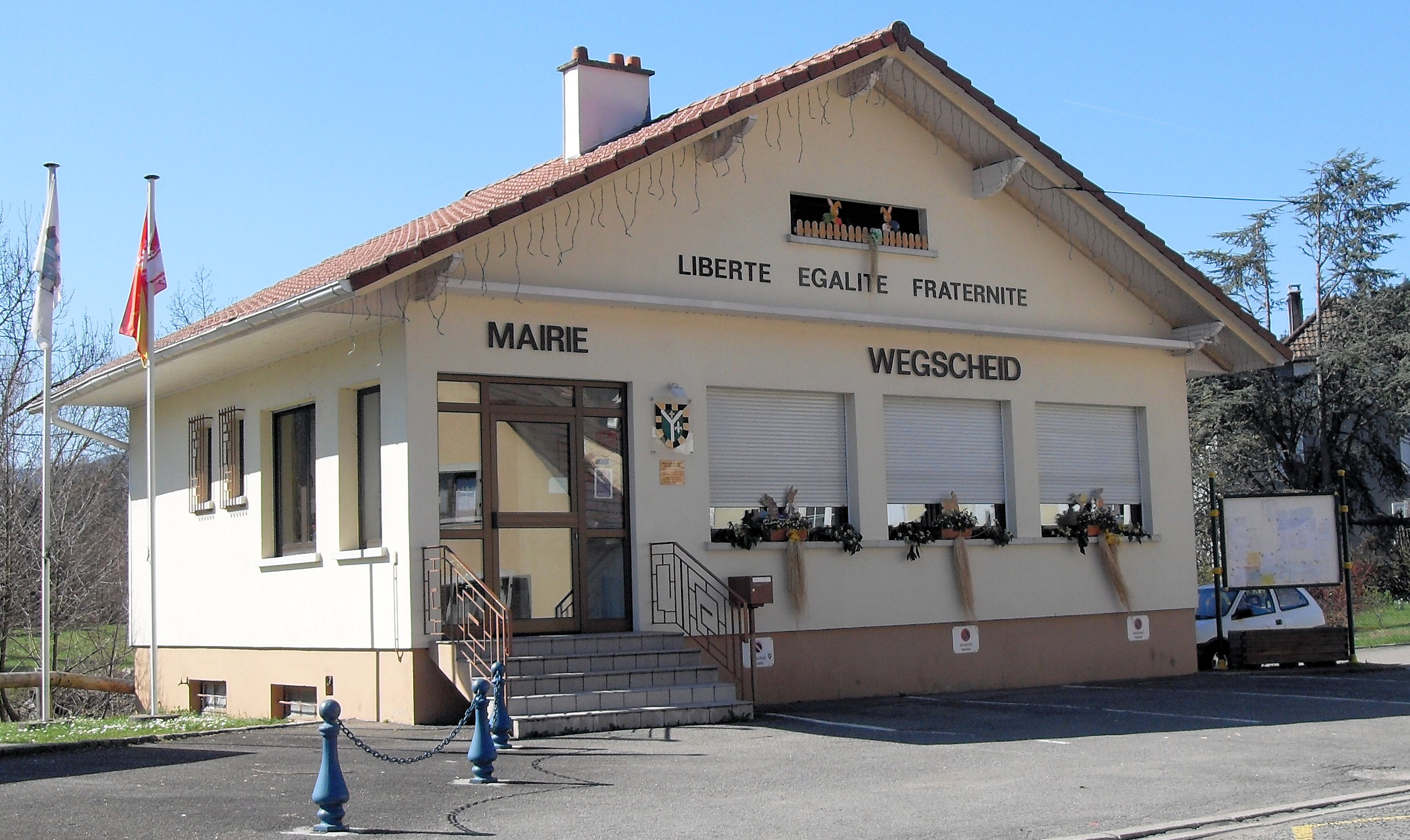
- The town hall in Wegscheid

- Coat of arms
- Location of Wegscheid
- Location within France Location within Grand Est
- Coordinates: 47°48′39″N 6°57′31″E
- Country: France
- Region: Grand Est
- Department: Haut-Rhin
- Arrondissement: Thann-Guebwiller
- Canton: Masevaux-Niederbruck
- Intercommunality: Vallée de la Doller et du Soultzbach

Government
  - Mayor (2020–2026): Jean-Marie Berlinger
- Area^{1}: 10.06 km^{2} (3.88 sq mi)
- Elevation: 455 m (1,493 ft)
- Highest elevation: 1,190 m (3,900 ft)
- Lowest elevation: 444 m (1,457 ft)
- Population (2023): 315
  - Density: 31.3/km^{2} (81.1/sq mi)
- Time zone: UTC+01:00 (CET)
  - Summer (DST): UTC+02:00 (CEST)
- INSEE/Postal code: 68361 /68290
- ^{1} French Land Register data, which excludes lakes, ponds, glaciers > 1 km^{2} (0.386 sq mi or 247 acres) and river estuaries.

Wegscheid is a commune in the Haut-Rhin department in Grand Est in north-eastern France.

== Population ==
Historical population
Year	Pop.	±% p.a.
1968	286	—
1975	286	+0.00%
1982	282	−0.20%
1990	299	+0.73%
1999	304	+0.18%
2007	331	+1.07%
2012	336	+0.30%
2017	322	−0.85%
2023	315	−0.37%
Source: INSEE

== See also ==
- Communes of the Haut-Rhin department
