= Kirchberg, Haut-Rhin =

Commune in Grand Est, France

Kirchberg
- Commune
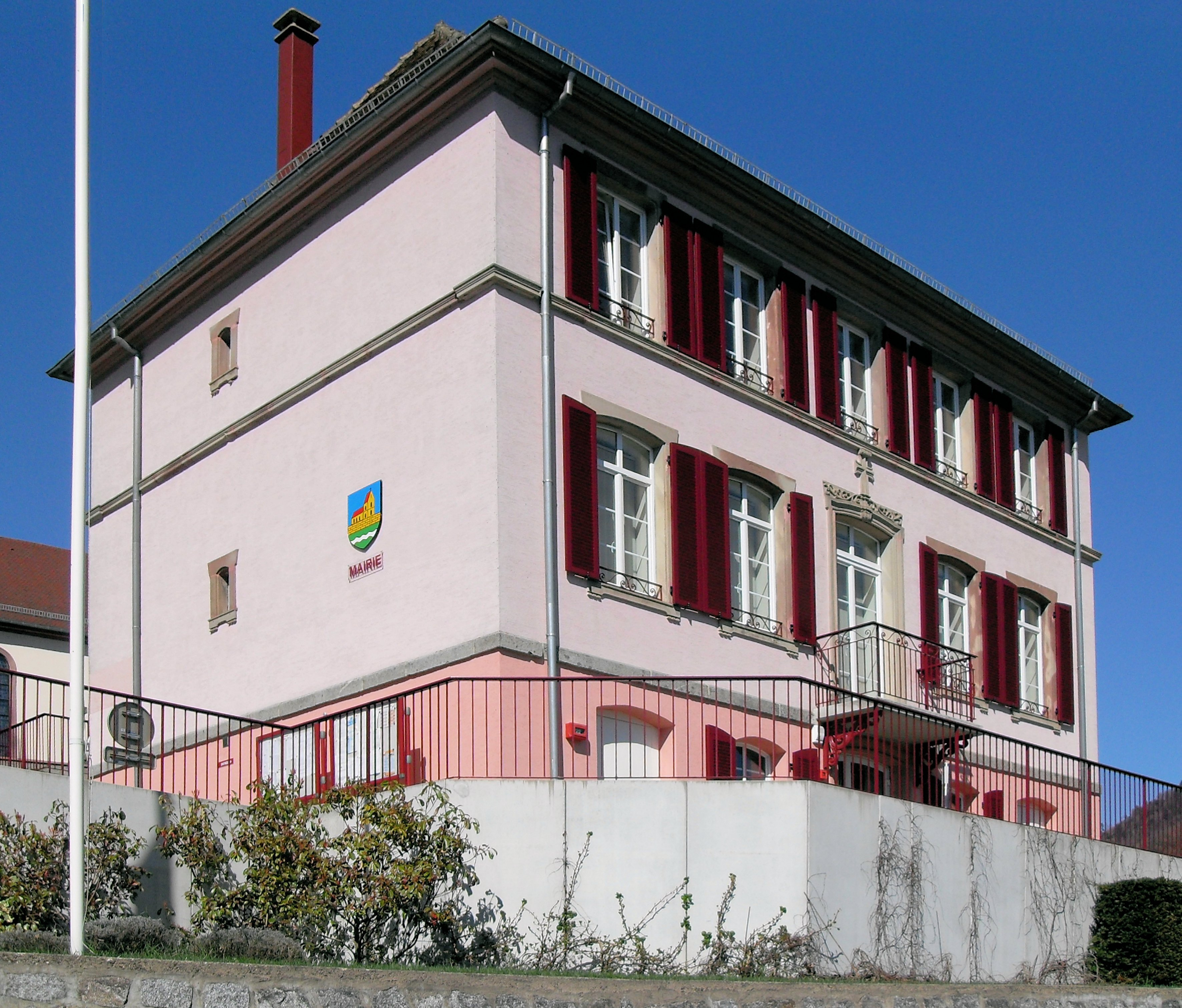
- The town hall in Kirchberg

- Coat of arms
- Location of Kirchberg
- Location within France Location within Grand Est
- Coordinates: 47°47′50″N 6°57′10″E
- Country: France
- Region: Grand Est
- Department: Haut-Rhin
- Arrondissement: Thann-Guebwiller
- Canton: Masevaux-Niederbruck
- Intercommunality: Vallée de la Doller et du Soultzbach

Government
  - Mayor (2020–2026): Fabienne Orlandi
- Area^{1}: 6.74 km^{2} (2.60 sq mi)
- Elevation: 440 m (1,440 ft)
- Highest elevation: 1,070 m (3,510 ft)
- Lowest elevation: 433 m (1,421 ft)
- Population (2023): 717
  - Density: 106/km^{2} (276/sq mi)
- Time zone: UTC+01:00 (CET)
  - Summer (DST): UTC+02:00 (CEST)
- INSEE/Postal code: 68167 /68290
- ^{1} French Land Register data, which excludes lakes, ponds, glaciers > 1 km^{2} (0.386 sq mi or 247 acres) and river estuaries.

Kirchberg (French pronunciation: [kiʁʃbɛʁɡ]) is a commune in the Haut-Rhin department in Grand Est in north-eastern France.

== See also ==
- Communes of the Haut-Rhin département
