= Urbès =

Commune in Grand Est, France

- Commune
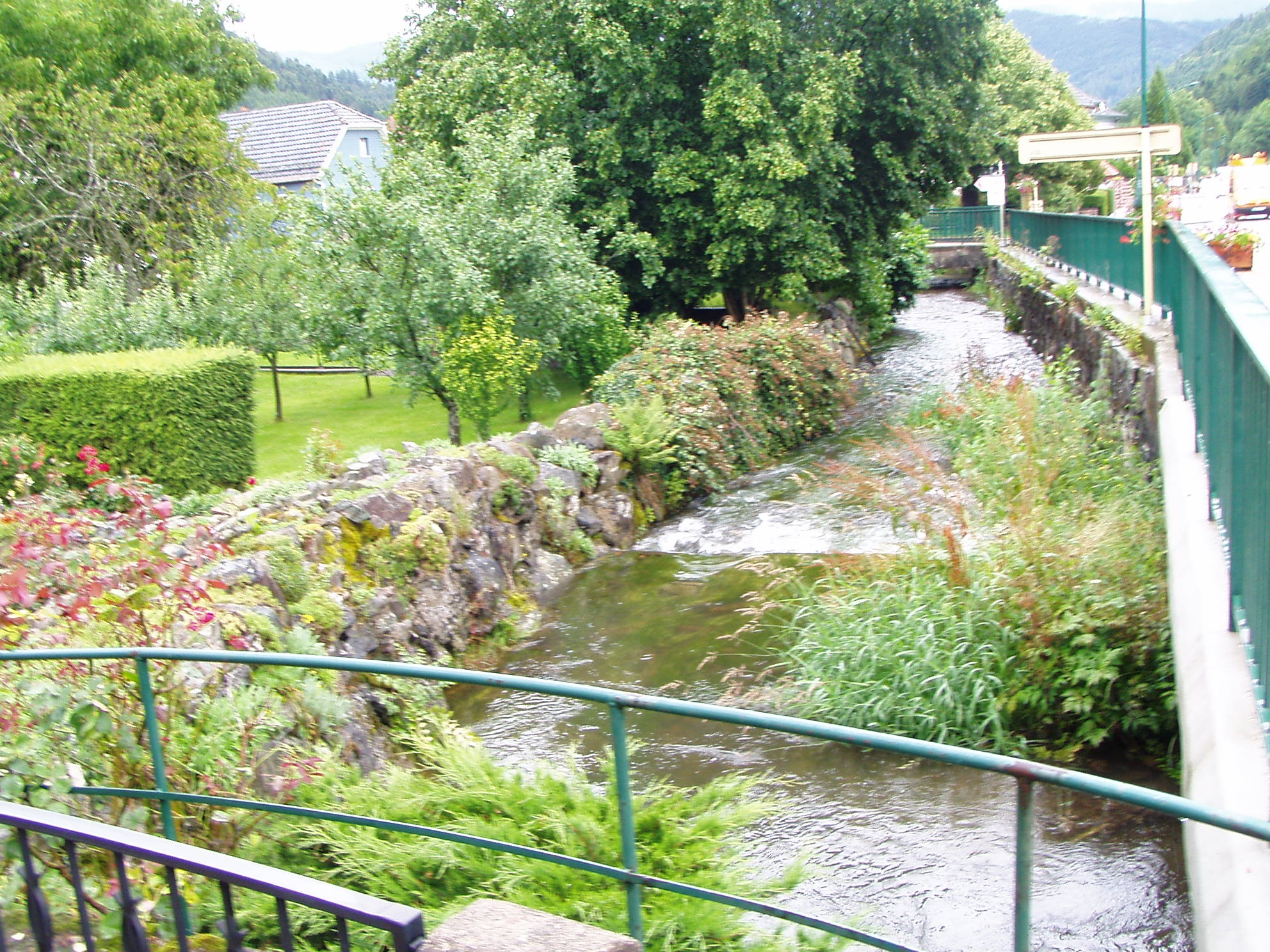
- Urbès River

- Coat of arms
- Location of Urbès
- Location within France Location within Grand Est
- Coordinates: 47°53′02″N 6°57′24″E
- Country: France
- Region: Grand Est
- Department: Haut-Rhin
- Arrondissement: Thann-Guebwiller
- Canton: Cernay
- Intercommunality: Vallée de Saint-Amarin

Government
  - Mayor (2020–2026): Stéphane Kuntz
- Area^{1}: 12.68 km^{2} (4.90 sq mi)
- Elevation: 450 m (1,480 ft)
- Highest elevation: 1,225 m (4,019 ft)
- Lowest elevation: 442 m (1,450 ft)
- Population (2023): 427
  - Density: 33.7/km^{2} (87.2/sq mi)
- Time zone: UTC+01:00 (CET)
  - Summer (DST): UTC+02:00 (CEST)
- INSEE/Postal code: 68344 /68121
- ^{1} French Land Register data, which excludes lakes, ponds, glaciers > 1 km^{2} (0.386 sq mi or 247 acres) and river estuaries.

Urbès (German: Urbis) is a commune in the Haut-Rhin department in Grand Est in north-eastern France.

== See also ==
- Communes of the Haut-Rhin department
