= Ranspach =

Commune in Grand Est, France

- Commune
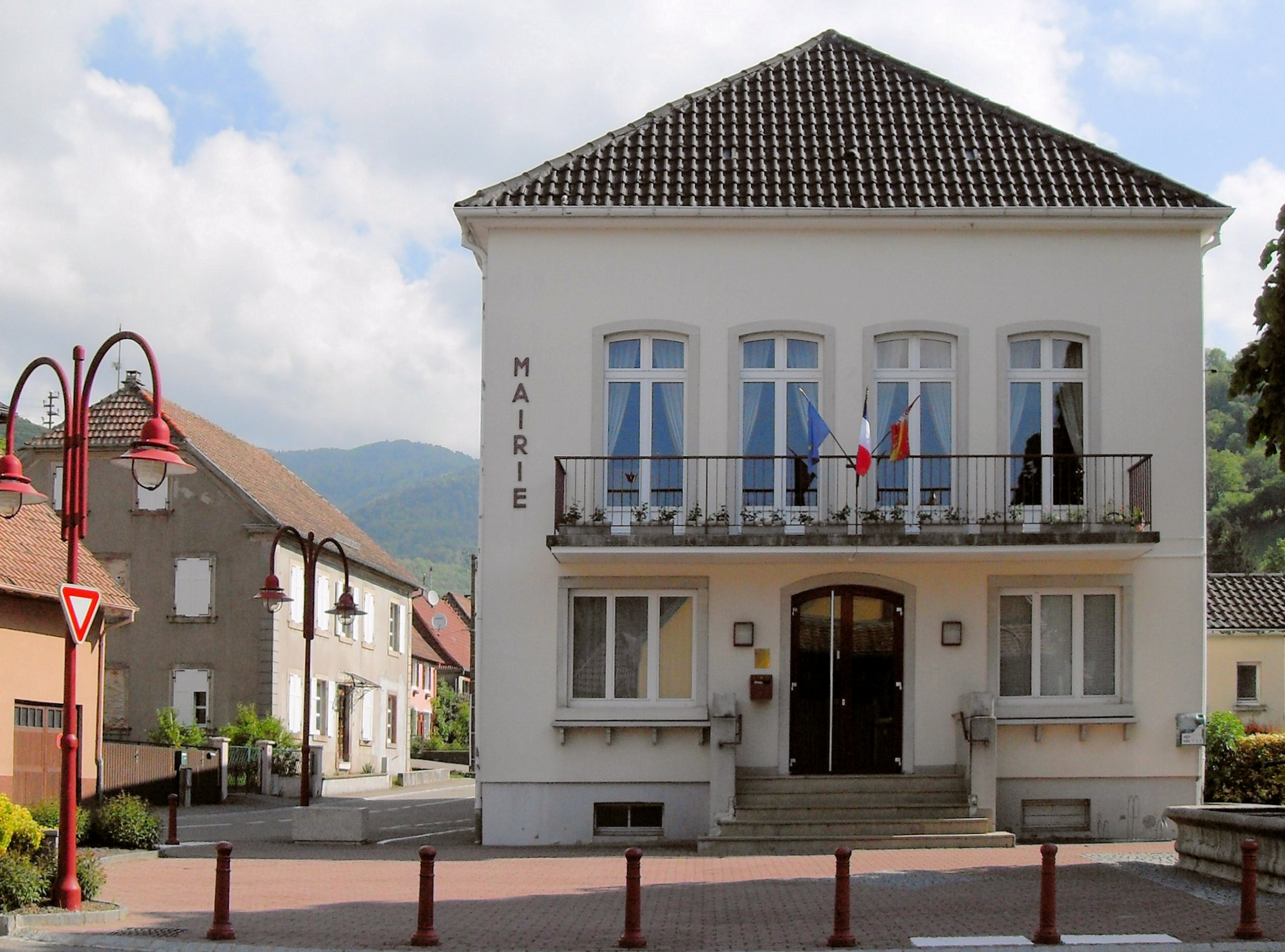
- The town hall in Ranspach

- Coat of arms
- Location of Ranspach
- Location within France Location within Grand Est
- Coordinates: 47°53′10″N 7°00′35″E
- Country: France
- Region: Grand Est
- Department: Haut-Rhin
- Arrondissement: Thann-Guebwiller
- Canton: Cernay
- Intercommunality: Vallée de Saint-Amarin

Government
  - Mayor (2020–2026): Jean-Léon Tacquard
- Area^{1}: 11.4 km^{2} (4.4 sq mi)
- Elevation: 450 m (1,480 ft)
- Highest elevation: 1,260 m (4,130 ft)
- Lowest elevation: 409 m (1,342 ft)
- Population (2023): 769
  - Density: 67.5/km^{2} (175/sq mi)
- Time zone: UTC+01:00 (CET)
  - Summer (DST): UTC+02:00 (CEST)
- INSEE/Postal code: 68262 /68470
- ^{1} French Land Register data, which excludes lakes, ponds, glaciers > 1 km^{2} (0.386 sq mi or 247 acres) and river estuaries.

Ranspach is a commune in the Haut-Rhin department in Grand Est in north-eastern France.

== See also ==
- Communes of the Haut-Rhin department
