= Canton of Cernay =

Coordinates: 47.81°N 7.18°E

The canton of Cernay is an administrative division of the Haut-Rhin department, northeastern France. Its borders were modified at the French canton reorganisation which came into effect in March 2015. Its seat is in Cernay.

It consists of the following communes:

1. Aspach-le-Bas
2. Aspach-Michelbach
3. Bitschwiller-lès-Thann
4. Bourbach-le-Bas
5. Bourbach-le-Haut
6. Cernay
7. Fellering
8. Geishouse
9. Goldbach-Altenbach
10. Husseren-Wesserling
11. Kruth
12. Leimbach
13. Malmerspach
14. Mitzach
15. Mollau
16. Moosch
17. Oderen
18. Rammersmatt
19. Ranspach
20. Roderen
21. Saint-Amarin
22. Schweighouse-Thann
23. Steinbach
24. Storckensohn
25. Thann
26. Uffholtz
27. Urbès
28. Vieux-Thann
29. Wattwiller
30. Wildenstein
31. Willer-sur-Thur
