= Steinbach, Haut-Rhin =

Commune in Grand Est, France

Steinbach
- Commune
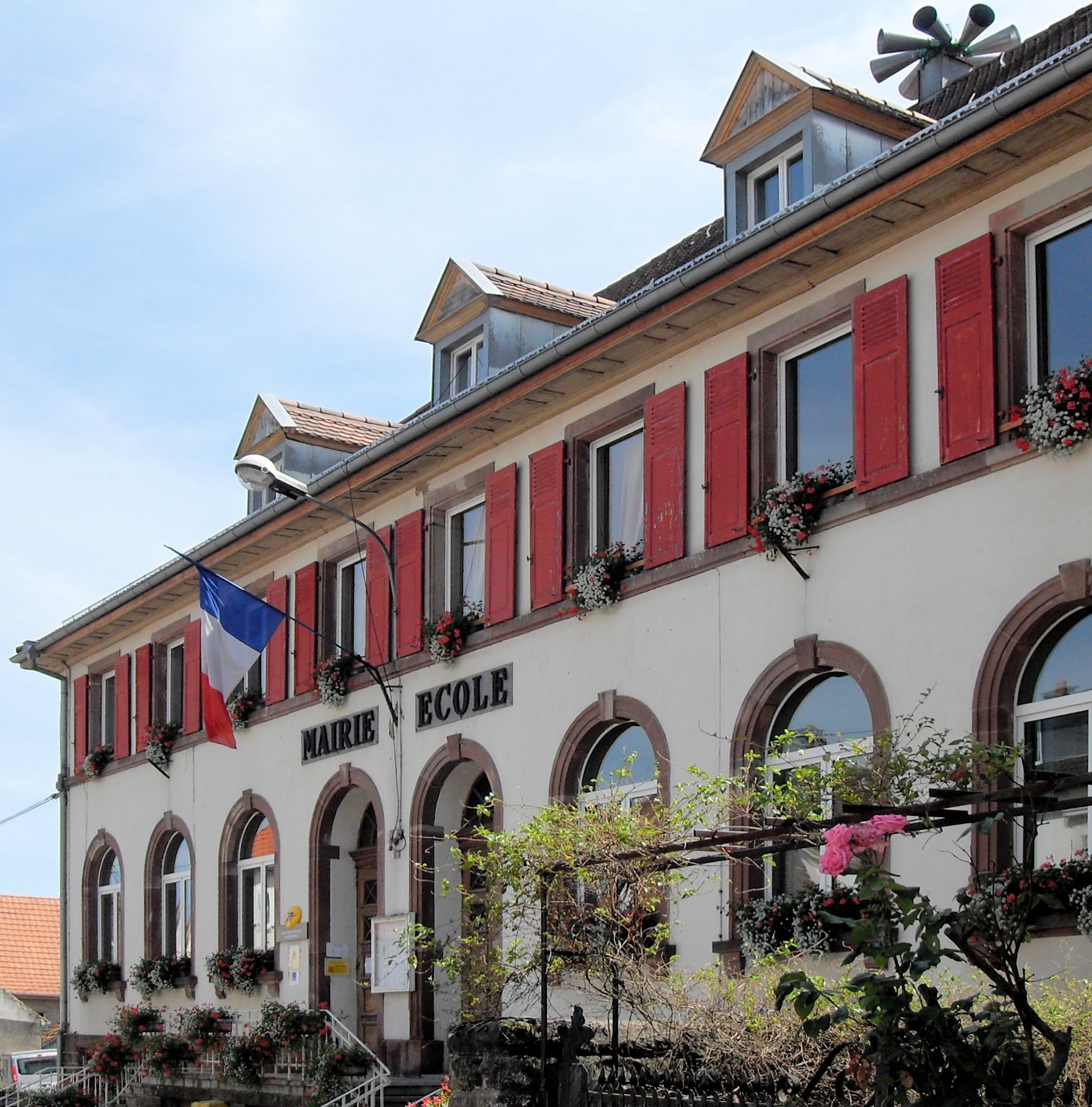
- The town hall and school in Steinbach

- Coat of arms
- Location of Steinbach
- Location within France Location within Grand Est
- Coordinates: 47°49′17″N 7°09′11″E
- Country: France
- Region: Grand Est
- Department: Haut-Rhin
- Arrondissement: Thann-Guebwiller
- Canton: Cernay

Government
  - Mayor (2020–2026): Marc Roger
- Area^{1}: 6.09 km^{2} (2.35 sq mi)
- Elevation: 360 m (1,180 ft)
- Highest elevation: 922 m (3,025 ft)
- Lowest elevation: 309 m (1,014 ft)
- Population (2023): 1,379
  - Density: 226/km^{2} (586/sq mi)
- Time zone: UTC+01:00 (CET)
  - Summer (DST): UTC+02:00 (CEST)
- INSEE/Postal code: 68322 /68700
- ^{1} French Land Register data, which excludes lakes, ponds, glaciers > 1 km^{2} (0.386 sq mi or 247 acres) and river estuaries.

Steinbach (French: [ʃtajnbak], German: [ˈʃtaɪnbax]; Alemannic German: Steibàch) is a commune in the Haut-Rhin department, administrative region of Grand Est (formerly Alsace), northeastern France.

== See also ==
- Communes of the Haut-Rhin department
