= Vieux-Thann =

Commune in Grand Est, France

- Commune
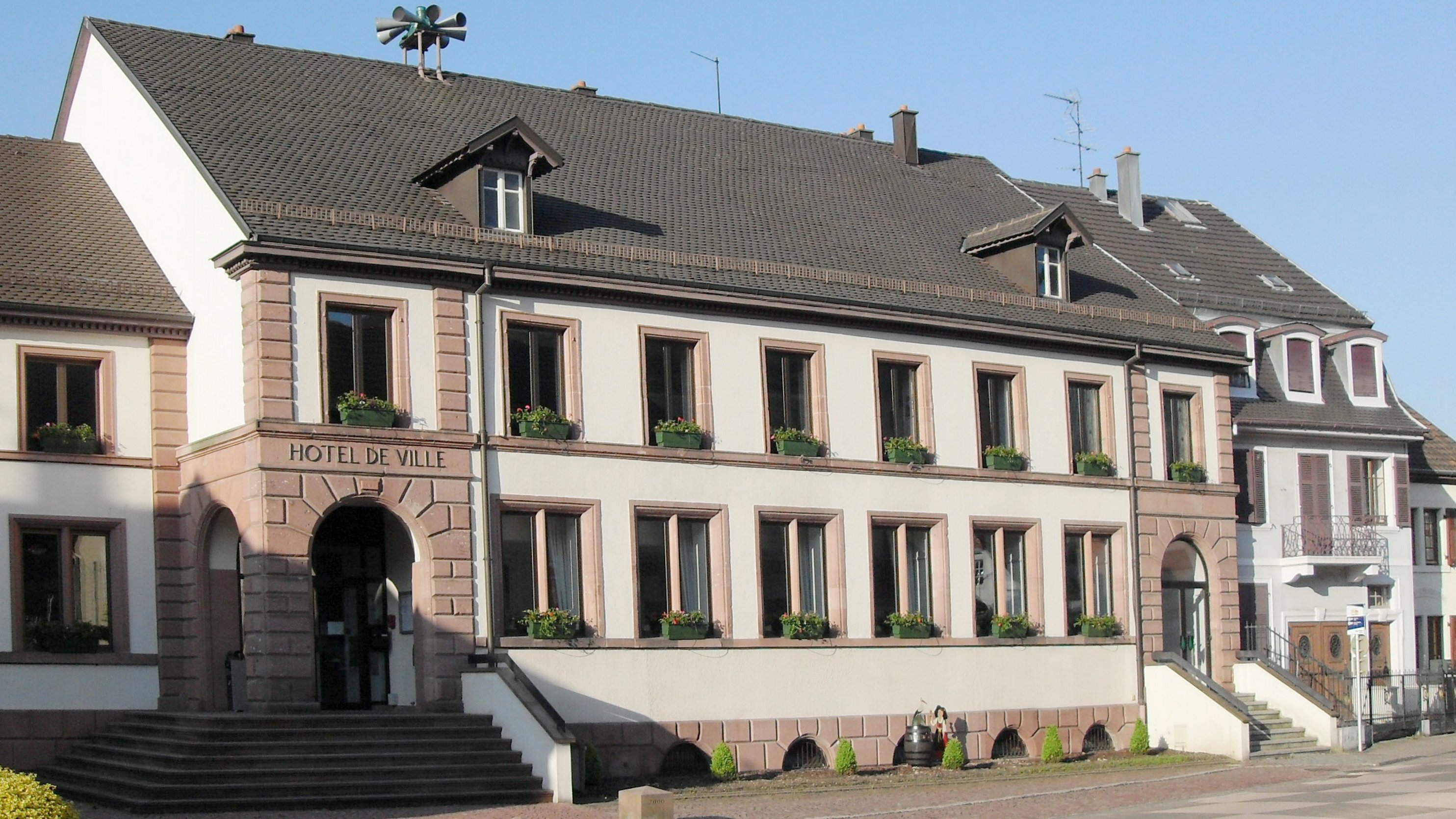
- The town hall in Vieux-Thann

- Coat of arms
- Location of Vieux-Thann
- Location within France Location within Grand Est
- Coordinates: 47°48′10″N 7°07′18″E
- Country: France
- Region: Grand Est
- Department: Haut-Rhin
- Arrondissement: Thann-Guebwiller
- Canton: Cernay
- Intercommunality: Thann-Cernay

Government
  - Mayor (2020–2026): Daniel Neff
- Area^{1}: 5.11 km^{2} (1.97 sq mi)
- Elevation: 325 m (1,066 ft)
- Highest elevation: 642 m (2,106 ft)
- Lowest elevation: 312 m (1,024 ft)
- Population (2023): 2,866
  - Density: 561/km^{2} (1,450/sq mi)
- Time zone: UTC+01:00 (CET)
  - Summer (DST): UTC+02:00 (CEST)
- INSEE/Postal code: 68348 /68800
- ^{1} French Land Register data, which excludes lakes, ponds, glaciers > 1 km^{2} (0.386 sq mi or 247 acres) and river estuaries.

Vieux-Thann (French pronunciation: [vjø tan]; German: Altthann; both lit. 'Old Thann') is a commune in the Haut-Rhin department in Grand Est in north-eastern France.

== Population ==
Historical population
Year	Pop.	±% p.a.
1968	3,083	—
1975	2,889	−0.92%
1982	2,770	−0.60%
1990	2,864	+0.42%
1999	2,979	+0.44%
2007	2,894	−0.36%
2012	2,895	+0.01%
2017	2,843	−0.36%
2023	2,866	+0.13%
Source: INSEE

== See also ==
- Communes of the Haut-Rhin department
