= Roderen =

Commune in Grand Est, France

- Commune
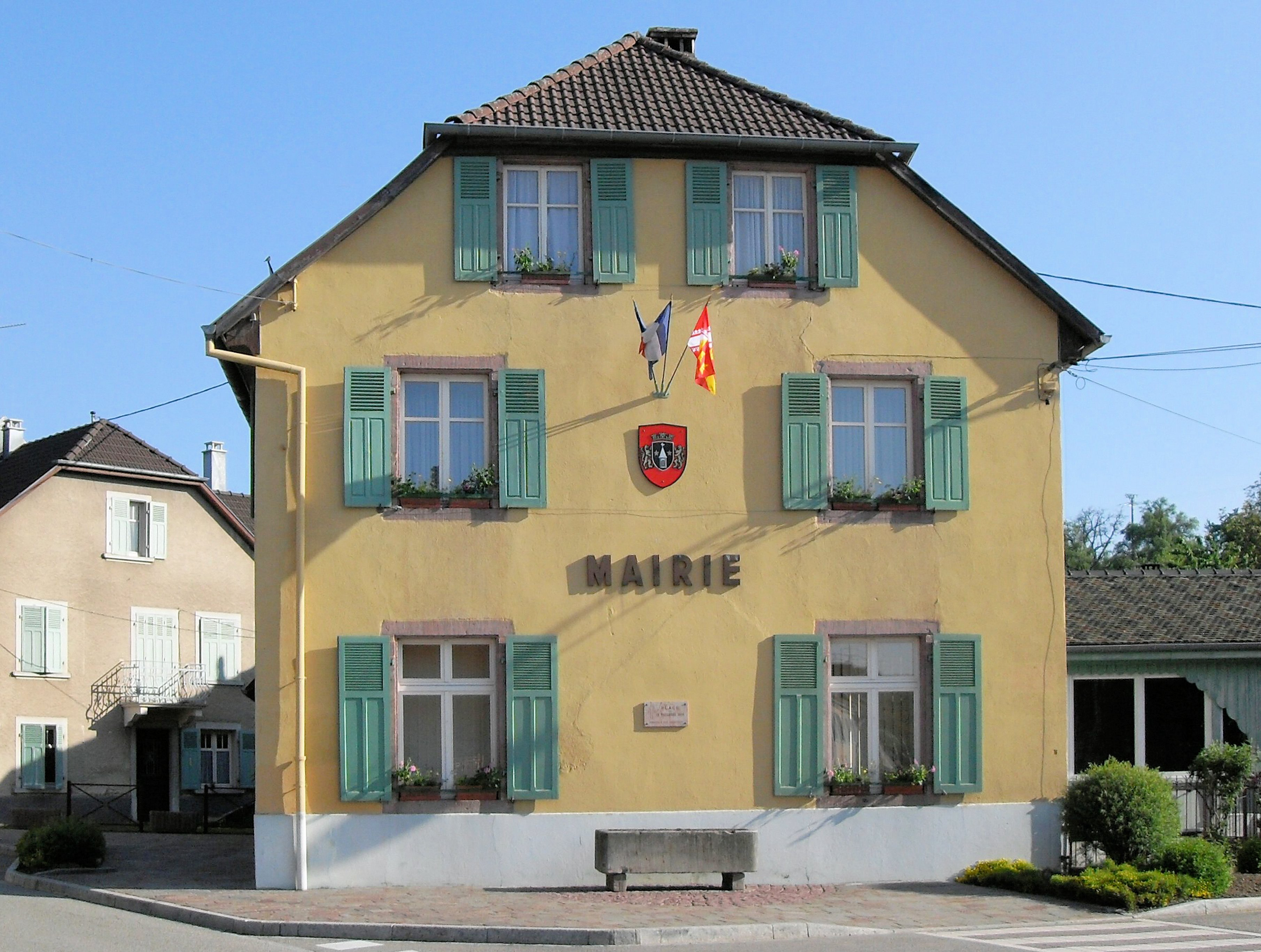
- The town hall in Roderen

- Coat of arms
- Location of Roderen
- Location within France Location within Grand Est
- Coordinates: 47°46′51″N 7°05′34″E
- Country: France
- Region: Grand Est
- Department: Haut-Rhin
- Arrondissement: Thann-Guebwiller
- Canton: Cernay

Government
  - Mayor (2020–2026): Christophe Kippelen
- Area^{1}: 7.16 km^{2} (2.76 sq mi)
- Elevation: 350 m (1,150 ft)
- Highest elevation: 514 m (1,686 ft)
- Lowest elevation: 327 m (1,073 ft)
- Population (2023): 902
  - Density: 126/km^{2} (326/sq mi)
- Time zone: UTC+01:00 (CET)
  - Summer (DST): UTC+02:00 (CEST)
- INSEE/Postal code: 68279 /68800
- ^{1} French Land Register data, which excludes lakes, ponds, glaciers > 1 km^{2} (0.386 sq mi or 247 acres) and river estuaries.

Roderen (French pronunciation: [ʁodəʁən]) is a commune in the Haut-Rhin department in Grand Est in north-eastern France.

== See also ==
- Communes of the Haut-Rhin department
