= Goldbach-Altenbach =

Commune in Grand Est, France

- Commune
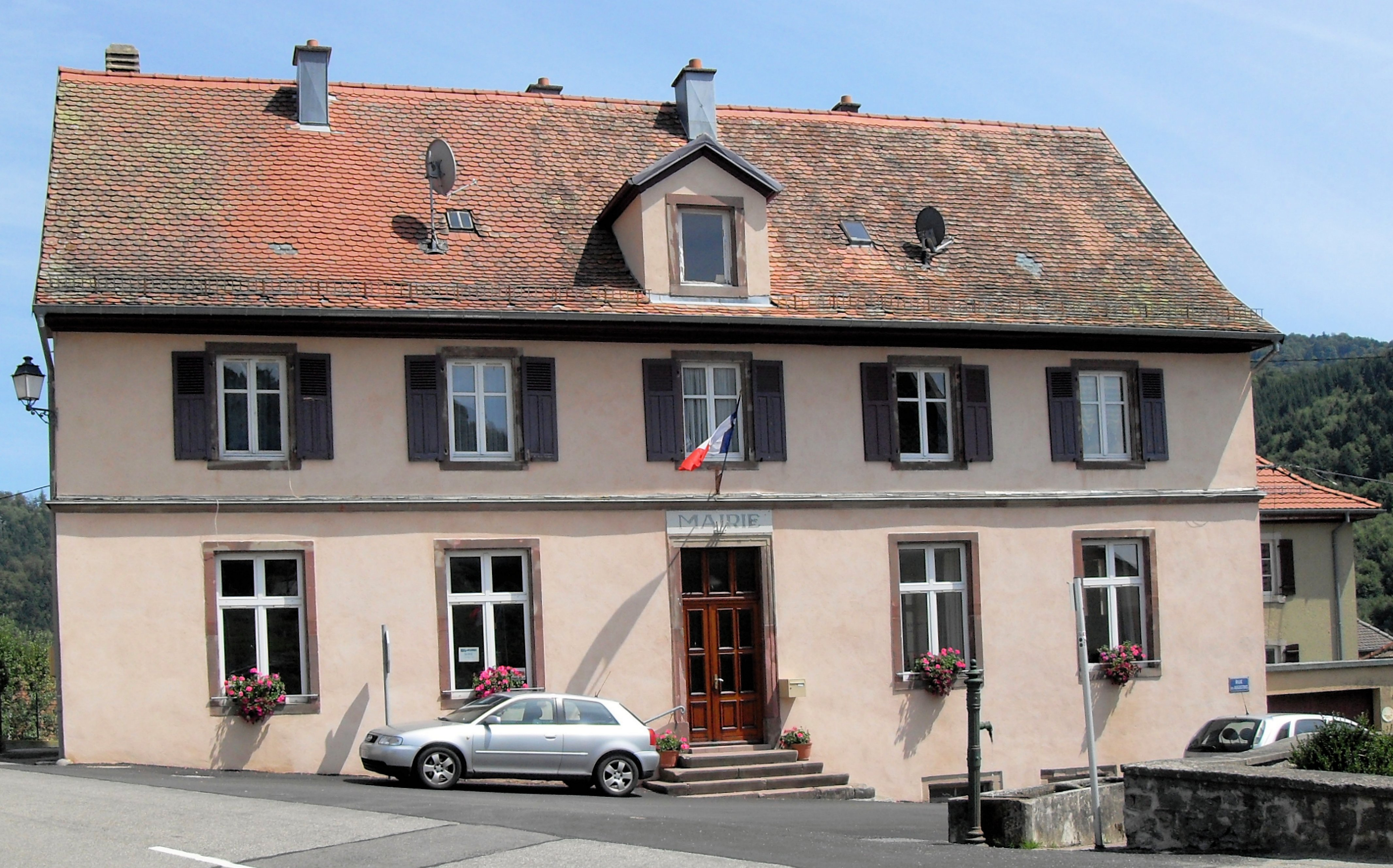
- The town hall in Goldbach-Altenbach

- Coat of arms
- Location of Goldbach-Altenbach
- Location within France Location within Grand Est
- Coordinates: 47°52′25″N 7°06′18″E
- Country: France
- Region: Grand Est
- Department: Haut-Rhin
- Arrondissement: Thann-Guebwiller
- Canton: Cernay
- Intercommunality: Vallée de Saint-Amarin

Government
  - Mayor (2020–2026): Jonathan Lerch
- Area^{1}: 9.14 km^{2} (3.53 sq mi)
- Elevation: 680 m (2,230 ft)
- Highest elevation: 1,420 m (4,660 ft)
- Lowest elevation: 482 m (1,581 ft)
- Population (2023): 261
  - Density: 28.6/km^{2} (74.0/sq mi)
- Time zone: UTC+01:00 (CET)
  - Summer (DST): UTC+02:00 (CEST)
- INSEE/Postal code: 68106 /68760
- ^{1} French Land Register data, which excludes lakes, ponds, glaciers > 1 km^{2} (0.386 sq mi or 247 acres) and river estuaries.

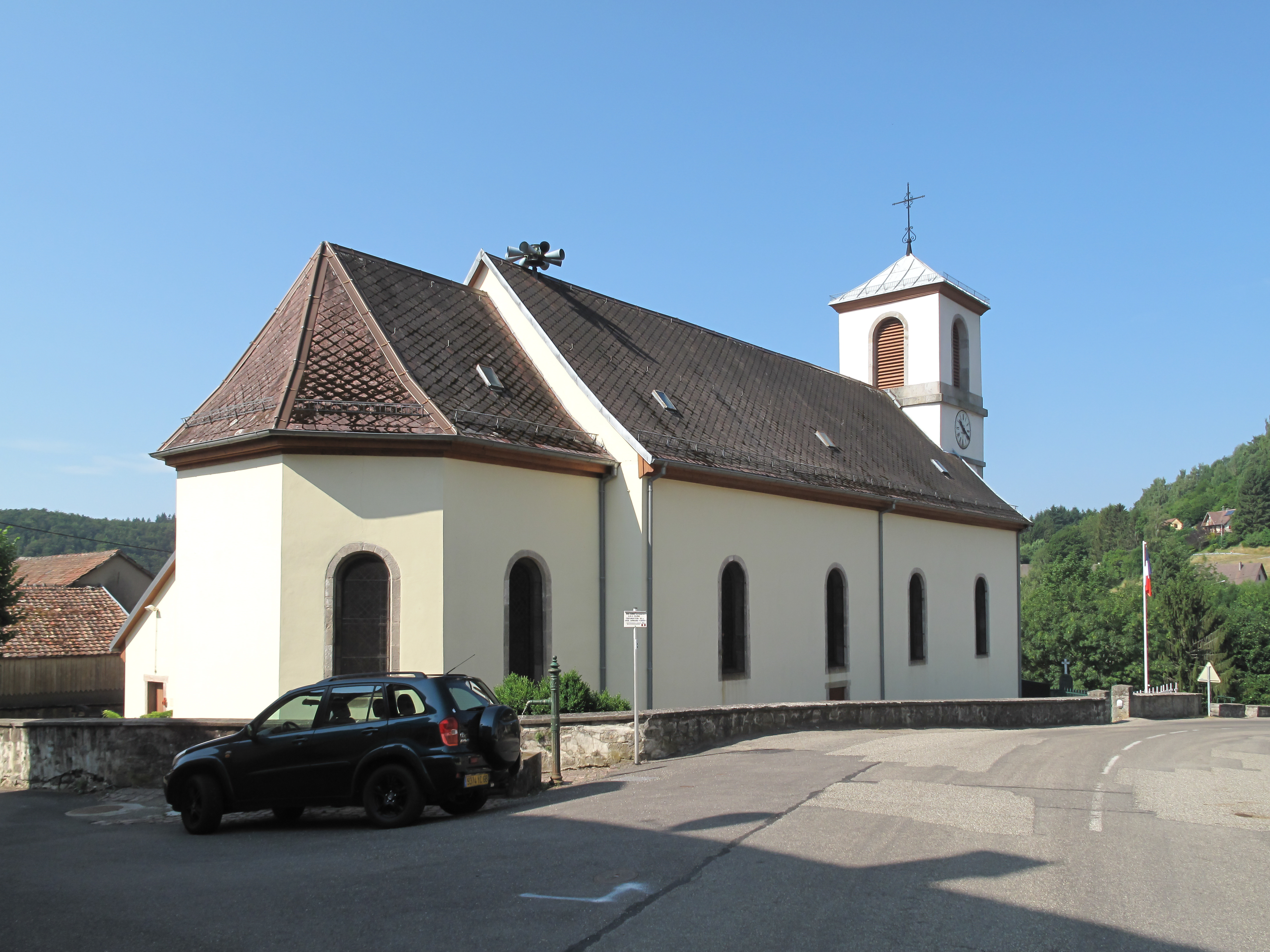
Goldbach-Altenbach, church: l'église Saint-Laurent

Goldbach-Altenbach is a commune in the Haut-Rhin department in Grand Est in north-eastern France.

== See also ==
- Communes of the Haut-Rhin département
