= Bourbach-le-Bas =

Commune in Grand Est, France

- Commune
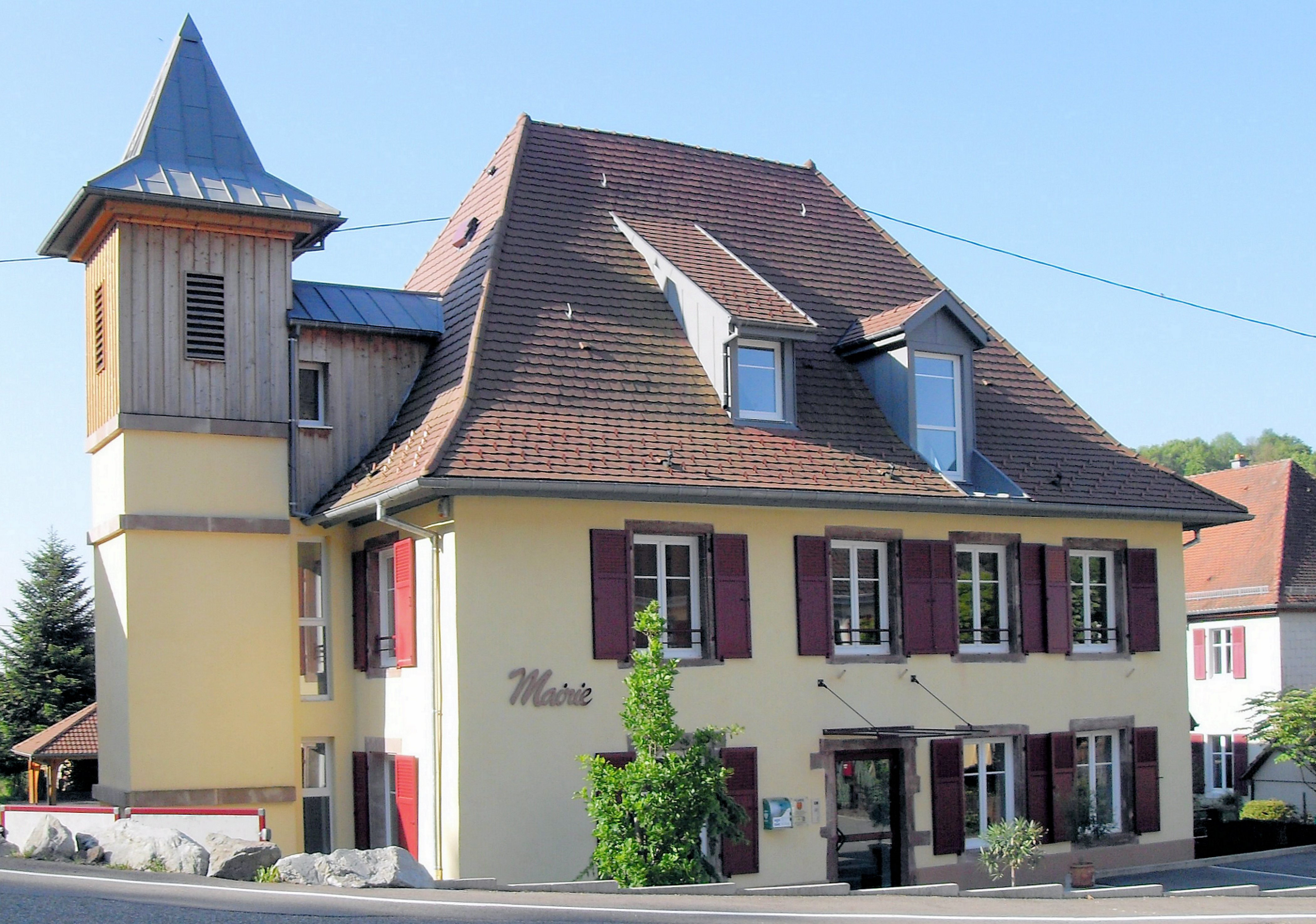
- The town hall in Bourbach-le-Bas

- Coat of arms
- Location of Bourbach-le-Bas
- Location within France Location within Grand Est
- Coordinates: 47°46′30″N 7°03′38″E
- Country: France
- Region: Grand Est
- Department: Haut-Rhin
- Arrondissement: Thann-Guebwiller
- Canton: Cernay

Government
  - Mayor (2024–2026): Christophe Bihler
- Area^{1}: 6.04 km^{2} (2.33 sq mi)
- Elevation: 380 m (1,250 ft)
- Highest elevation: 731 m (2,398 ft)
- Lowest elevation: 347 m (1,138 ft)
- Population (2023): 556
  - Density: 92.1/km^{2} (238/sq mi)
- Time zone: UTC+01:00 (CET)
  - Summer (DST): UTC+02:00 (CEST)
- INSEE/Postal code: 68045 /68290
- ^{1} French Land Register data, which excludes lakes, ponds, glaciers > 1 km^{2} (0.386 sq mi or 247 acres) and river estuaries.

Bourbach-le-Bas (French pronunciation: [buʁbak lə ba]; German: Niederburbach) is a commune in the Haut-Rhin department in Grand Est in north-eastern France.

== Public Transportation ==
The town is served by the Glantzmann bus company on weekdays during the school year.

== See also ==
- Communes of the Haut-Rhin department
