= Leimbach, Haut-Rhin =

Commune in Grand Est, France

Leimbach
- Commune
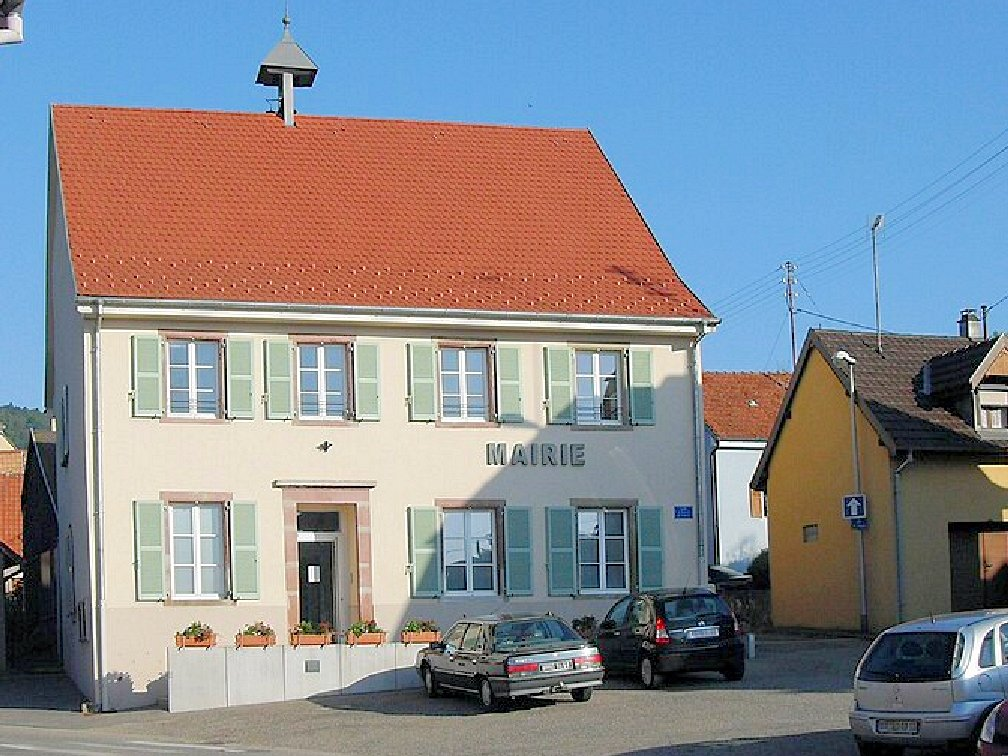
- The town hall in Leimbach

- Coat of arms
- Location of Leimbach
- Location within France Location within Grand Est
- Coordinates: 47°47′37″N 7°06′07″E
- Country: France
- Region: Grand Est
- Department: Haut-Rhin
- Arrondissement: Thann-Guebwiller
- Canton: Cernay

Government
  - Mayor (2020–2026): Philippe Ziegler
- Area^{1}: 3.57 km^{2} (1.38 sq mi)
- Elevation: 350 m (1,150 ft)
- Highest elevation: 663 m (2,175 ft)
- Lowest elevation: 326 m (1,070 ft)
- Population (2023): 928
  - Density: 260/km^{2} (673/sq mi)
- Time zone: UTC+01:00 (CET)
  - Summer (DST): UTC+02:00 (CEST)
- INSEE/Postal code: 68180 /68800
- ^{1} French Land Register data, which excludes lakes, ponds, glaciers > 1 km^{2} (0.386 sq mi or 247 acres) and river estuaries.

Leimbach (French pronunciation: [laimbak]) is a commune in the Haut-Rhin department in Grand Est in north-eastern France.

== Etymology ==
Leimbach was historically attested as Leymbach in 1223. The toponym Leimbach is of Germanic origin, cognate to modern German Lehm, denoting clay. The Germanic hydronym *-bak(i) entered the French language via High German, and took on two forms: the Germanic form -bach and Romantic -bais.

== See also ==
- Communes of the Haut-Rhin département
