= Willer-sur-Thur =

Commune in Grand Est, France

- Commune
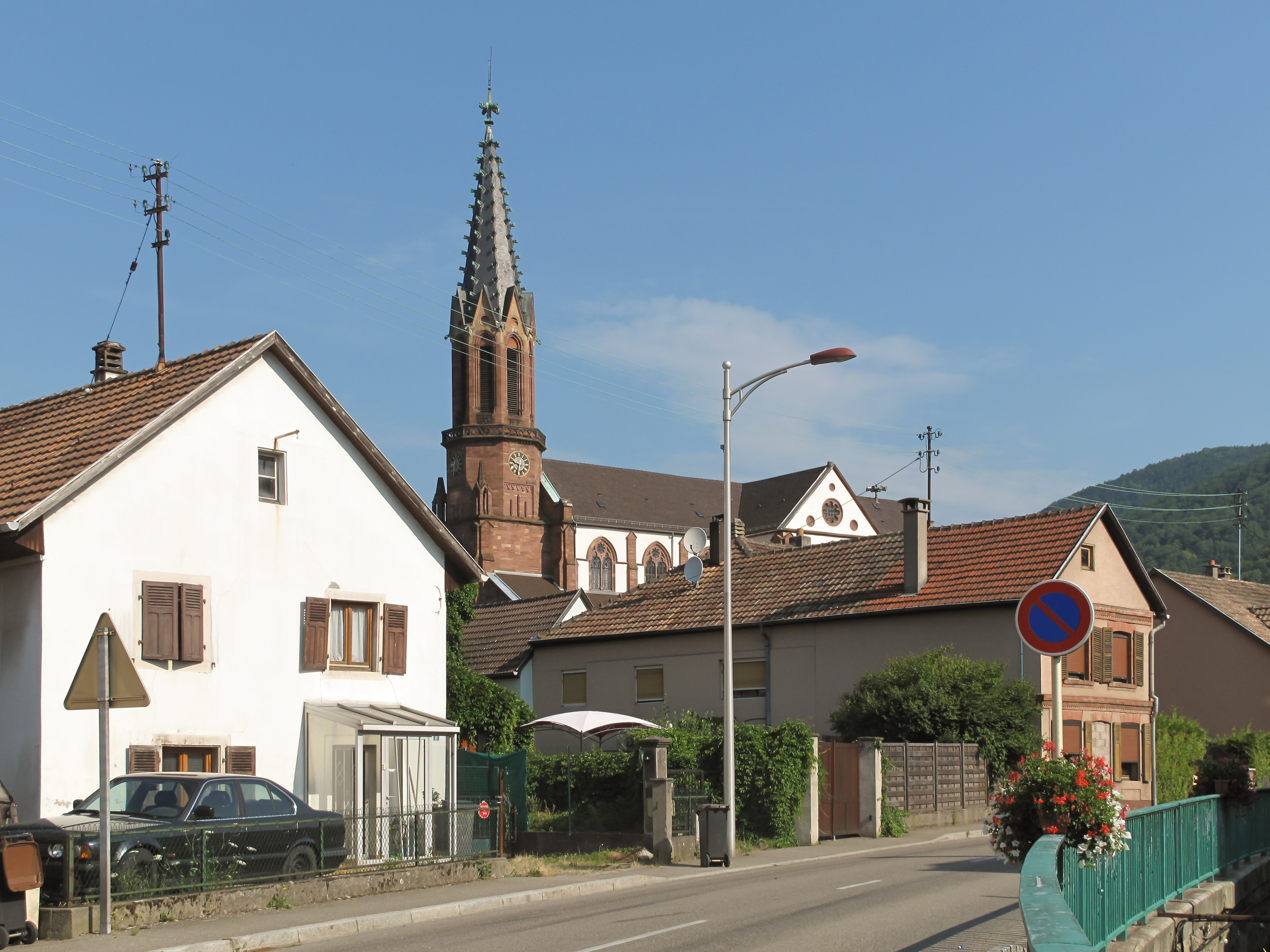
- The church and surroundings in Willer-sur-Thur

- Coat of arms
- Location of Willer-sur-Thur
- Location within France Location within Grand Est
- Coordinates: 47°50′40″N 7°04′25″E
- Country: France
- Region: Grand Est
- Department: Haut-Rhin
- Arrondissement: Thann-Guebwiller
- Canton: Cernay
- Intercommunality: Thann-Cernay

Government
  - Mayor (2020–2026): Jean-Luc Martini
- Area^{1}: 18.0 km^{2} (6.9 sq mi)
- Elevation: 370 m (1,210 ft)
- Highest elevation: 1,183 m (3,881 ft)
- Lowest elevation: 356 m (1,168 ft)
- Population (2023): 1,773
  - Density: 98.5/km^{2} (255/sq mi)
- Time zone: UTC+01:00 (CET)
  - Summer (DST): UTC+02:00 (CEST)
- INSEE/Postal code: 68372 /68760
- ^{1} French Land Register data, which excludes lakes, ponds, glaciers > 1 km^{2} (0.386 sq mi or 247 acres) and river estuaries.

Willer-sur-Thur (German: Weiler an der Thur) is a commune in the Haut-Rhin department in Grand Est in north-eastern France.

== Population ==
Historical population
Year	Pop.	±% p.a.
1968	1,828	—
1975	1,923	+0.73%
1982	2,019	+0.70%
1990	1,947	−0.45%
1999	1,875	−0.42%
2007	1,916	+0.27%
2012	1,873	−0.45%
2017	1,825	−0.52%
2023	1,773	−0.48%
Source: INSEE

== See also ==
- Communes of the Haut-Rhin department
