= Michelbach =

Michelbach may refer to:

== Places in Austria ==
- Michelbach, Lower Austria

== Places in France ==
- Michelbach-le-Bas, Haut-Rhin
- Michelbach-le-Haut, Haut-Rhin
- Aspach-Michelbach, Haut-Rhin
  - Michelbach, Haut-Rhin

== Places in Germany ==
- Michelbach, Saarland, part of the municipality of Schmelz
- Michelbach, Marburg, Hesse
- Michelbach an der Bilz, Baden-Württemberg
- Michelbach, Alzenau, Bavaria
- Michelbach, Altenkirchen, Rhineland-Palatinate
- Michelbach, Rhein-Hunsrück, Rhineland-Palatinate
- Wald-Michelbach, Hesse
- Michelbach, a district of Gaggenau, Baden-Württemberg
- Michelbach/Heide, a district of Gerabronn, Baden-Württemberg
- Michelbach, a district of Aarbergen, Hesse

== Rivers in Germany ==
- Michelbach (Bessenbach), Bavaria, tributary of the Bessenbach
- Michelbach (Nidda), Hesse, tributary of the Nidda
- Michelbach (Gersprenz), Hesse, tributary of the Gersprenz
- Michelbach (Usa), Hesse, tributary of the Usa
