= 119th Field Artillery Regiment =

American Field Artillery Regiment

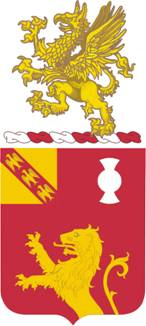
- Coat of arms
- Active: 6 November 1911–present
- Country: United States
- Allegiance: Michigan
- Branch: Michigan National Guard
- Type: Field artillery
- Role: Indirect and counter—battery fire
- Size: Over 200
- Part of: 272nd Regional Support Group, Michigan National Guard
- Headquarters: Lansing, Michigan
- Nickname: Red Lions
- Motto: Viam Praeparamus (We Prepare the Way)
- Regiment colors: Scarlett and Yellow
- Artillery Weapons: M777 howitzer
- Engagements: World War I; World War II
- Decorations: Croix de Guerre with silver star; Croix de Guerre with palm (HHQ Battery only); Meritorious Unit Commendation
- Campaign streamers: World War I: Aisne–Marne 1918; Oise–Aisne 1918; Meuse–Argonne 1918; World War II: Normandy 1944; Northern France 1944; Rhineland 1944–1945; Ardennes-Alsace 1944–1945; Central Europe 1945

Insignia
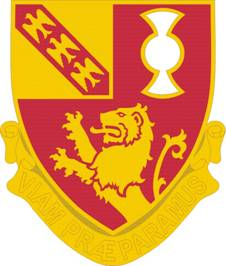
- Distinctive unit insignia

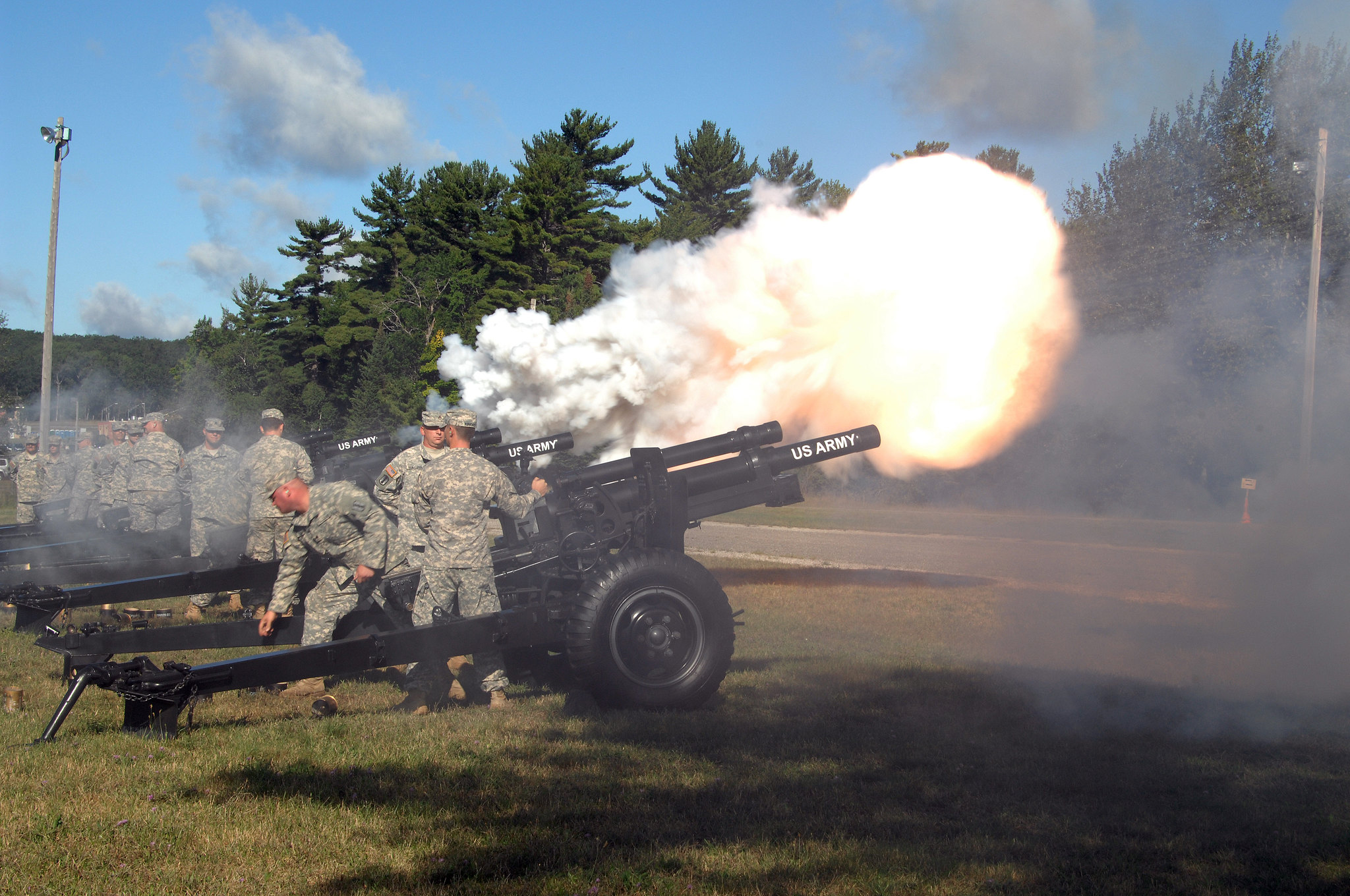
Battery B, 1st Battalion, 119th Field Artillery, fire howitzers at the start of the pass in review of troops and memorial ceremony at Camp Grayling

The 119th Field Artillery Regiment (119th FA), nicknamed the "Red Lions", is a Parent Field Artillery Regiment of the United States Army Regimental System (USARS) in the Michigan Army National Guard. The headquarters of the 119th Field Artillery Regiment is in Lansing, Michigan, and its principal training ground is at Camp Grayling, Michigan, the largest National Guard training center in the country. The Headquarters Battery of the current 119th Field Artillery Regiment can trace its history back to the First Battle of Bull Run in 1861, during the American Civil War. The history of the 119th Field Artillery Regiment as an entire regiment began on 6 November 1911 when it was organized as the 1st Battalion, Field Artillery in the Michigan National Guard.

The 119th Field Artillery Regiment saw its first action in battle when it was deployed to the Lorraine Region of France in 1918 during the First World War. The 119th Field Artillery Regiment was in combat for five months and supported seven American infantry divisions, the 3rd, 26th, 28th, 32nd, 77th, 79th, and the 89th and also executed a fire support mission for the 1st Moroccan Infantry Division. The 119th Field Artillery Regiment was involved in several major offensives during World War I. General Charles Mangin, commander of the French Tenth Army, awarded the 119th Field Artillery Regiment with the Croix de Guerre with a silver star for their distinguished service in battle during the Aisne–Marne and Oise–Aisne campaigns. The Headquarters Battery was awarded an additional Croix de Guerre with Palm, the highest order to be awarded during World War I. The 119th Field Artillery Regiment also participated in the final Meuse–Argonne offensive that drove the German Army to defeat.

After World War I, the 119th Field Artillery Regiment was called upon to help maintain the peace during the 1936 Auto Workers strike in Flint, Michigan. When the Allies invaded Normandy during World War II, the 119th Field Artillery Regiment landed in France shortly thereafter and was involved through to the end of the war. In 1967, the 119th Field Artillery Regiment was called upon to help maintain law and order in Detroit, Michigan during the riots of 1967. After the 11 September attacks, the 119th Field Artillery Regiment was thrust into the role of security as they assisted in searching trucks crossing the Canada–United States border in Detroit and Port Huron, Michigan. When the United States Army was short military police units as a result of the war on terror, the 119th Field Artillery Regiment was deployed to Guantanamo Bay Naval Base for eleven months to provide security at Camp Delta. The 119th Field Artillery provided a 21-gun salute at the state funeral for former President Gerald Ford.

== Early lineage ==
The lineage of the current day 119th Field Artillery Regiment traces back to 6 November 1911. On that day, existing Michigan National Guard units were reorganized into the 1st Battalion, Field Artillery.

=== Mexican Expedition ===
On 9 March 1916, Mexican revolutionary General Francisco "Pancho" Villa led a force of five hundred men and attacked the town of Columbus, New Mexico, killing several American soldiers and civilians. A week later, Brigadier General John J. Pershing, on orders from President Woodrow Wilson, assembled an expeditionary force of several thousand men to pursue Pancho Villa who had since retreated into Mexico. Less than three months later on 3 June 1916, the United States Congress passed the National Defense Act which gave the President of the United States the power to federalize and mobilize the various State National Guard units in the event of a war. Mexican bandits were still conducting cross border raids killing American soldiers and civilians. On 15 June 1916, one such cross border raid into San Ygnacio, Texas resulted in the deaths of four American soldiers. In response, President Woodrow Wilson federalized 110,000 National Guard soldiers on 19 June 1916 and ordered them to the Mexico–United States border.

Batteries A and B of the 1st Battalion, Field Artillery were mustered into federal service on 19 June 1916, for the first time. The rest of the units of the 1st Battalion, Field Artillery were disbanded. The 1st Battalion, Field Artillery was sent to Camp Grayling, Michigan and then on to El Paso, Texas to patrol the United States-Mexico border. Service on the border was uneventful, consisting mainly of guard duty, drill instructions, and marches. Neither Battery A or B of the 1st Battalion, Field Artillery set foot in Mexico during what is known today as the Mexican Expedition.

Brigadier General Pershing's troops were unsuccessful in catching Pancho Villa and the focus of the expeditionary force changed from actively seeking out Pancho Villa to a defensive position of protecting the troops from the forces supporting Mexican President Venustiano Carranza. American President Wilson and Mexican President Carranza agreed to establish a Joint High Commission to ease the tensions between the countries. The commission met at New London, Connecticut on 6 September 1916. The talks that resulted from these meetings eased the tensions sufficiently and the expeditionary force prepared for withdrawal and re-crossed the international border back into the United States on 5 February 1917. When hostilities ended, the 1st Battalion, Field Artillery returned to Michigan and were mustered out of federal service on 23 March 1917.

== World War I ==
The United States declared war on Germany on 6 April 1917, and the United States Congress passed the Selective Service Act on 18 May of that year to allow the United States to raise an army through the draft. The 1st Battalion, Field Artillery was officially reorganized as part of the Michigan National Guard on 26 June 1917 with its headquarters federally recognized at Lansing, Michigan on 5 July 1917.

Postcard from Virgil Cross of the 119th Field Artillery during training at Camp MacArthur, Waco, Texas, 1917

The National Guard of Michigan and Wisconsin were called into federal service on 15 July 1917. The United States War Department designated the National Guard troops of Michigan and Wisconsin to form the 32nd Infantry Division on 18 July 1917 with Camp MacArthur in Waco, Texas selected as the location for the training. Shortly thereafter, the 1st Battalion, Field Artillery was drafted into federal service on 5 August 1917. On 25 August 1917, the 57th Field Artillery Brigade was organized. On 23 September 1917, the 1st Battalion, Field Artillery was reorganized as the 1st Battalion, 119th Field Artillery as part of the newly formed 57th Field Artillery Brigade. The 119th Field Artillery absorbed the Headquarters and Supply companies of the 31st Michigan Infantry. Most of the new personnel for the 119th Field Artillery came from the 1st Battalion Field Artillery and 1st Squadron Cavalry of the 31st Michigan Infantry. Colonel Chester B. McCormick was appointed as the first commander of the 119th Field Artillery on 22 September 1917 and systematic training began a week later on 29 September.

The 1st Battalion, 119th Field Artillery relocated to Camp Merritt, New Jersey on 2 January 1918. From Camp Merritt, the troops marched for over an hour to Alpine Landing and then took a two-hour ferry boat ride to the port of Hoboken, New Jersey for embarkation to the European continent. The 119th Field Artillery set sail on 26 February 1918 and arrived at Liverpool, England on 6 March 1918. After a short stay in a rest camp, the 119th Field Artillery proceeded to Le Havre, France with the 5th Infantry Division to complete their transatlantic journey. The 119th Field Artillery detached from the 32nd Infantry Division and arrived at the French artillery school at Camp Coetquidan on 13 March 1918, to master the technique of field artillery. The 119th Field Artillery remained at Camp Coetquidan until 3 June 1918.

After leaving Camp Coetquidan, the 119th Field Artillery was sent to join the 26th Infantry Division in the Toul-Boucq Sector. The soldiers of the 119th Field Artillery fired their first salvo in World War I on 11 June 1918. Five days later, at 3:20 on 16 June 1918 near the village of Xivray-et-Marvoisin, the 119th Field Artillery opened fire on about 400 to 500 German troops who attempted to enter the village from the west and southwest. Despite suffering their first casualties of the war, the 119th Field Artillery rendered very valuable service with their fire and helped prevent the Germans from entering the village. On 25 June 1918, the 119th Field Artillery rejoined the 32nd Infantry Division in the Alsace region of France near the villages of Largitzen and Aspach-le-Haut.

On 22 July 1918, the 119th Field Artillery, as a part of the 32nd Infantry Division was absorbed into General Charles Mangin's French Tenth Army. Beginning on 22 July 1918, the soldiers of the 119th Field Artillery, with new horses and inexperienced drivers, were forced to march over 360 kilometers (224 miles) for five days from the Alsace region to just west of the town of Chateau Thierry. Due to the shortage of artillery harnesses, the soldiers of the 119th Field Artillery were compelled to drag 16 American caissons loaded with ammunition the entire distance. In order to save the horses, all the soldiers except the drivers walked and carried a full pack for which they had no previous training. On 27 July 1918 the 119th Field Artillery arrived near the town of Pont-Sainte-Maxence and the village of Bethisy-Saint-Martin and then proceeded to move towards Chateau-Thierry, and then into the Foret de Fere (Fere Forest) near the village of Jaulgonne.

=== Aisne–Marne counter-offensive ===
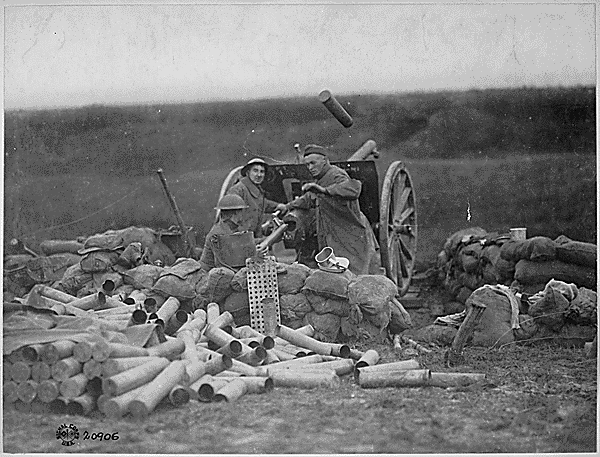
The 119th Field Artillery Regiment used the French Canon de 75 modèle 1897 during World War I. Here the cannon is being fired by soldiers of the 6th Field Artillery.

On the evening of 29 July 1918, the 119th Field Artillery arrived in the Picardy region of France, west of Chateau-Thierry, as part of the 32nd Infantry Division which relieved the American 3rd Infantry Division on the front line which stretched from Roncheres to Fere-en-Tardenois. This was the beginning of the Aisne–Marne counter-offensive also known as the Second Battle of the Marne. At 14:10 on 30 July 1918, the 119th Field Artillery commenced a full barrage of fire directed at the Bois de Grimpettes (Grimpettes Woods) just south of the village of Cierges. Twenty minutes later, at 14:30, the 119th Field Artillery switched to a creeping barrage to allow infantry units from the 32nd Infantry Division to follow close behind the line of artillery fire. Artillery fire continued throughout the day and into the night. On 31 July 1918, the 32nd Infantry Division stormed and captured Cierges and a ridge one kilometer (5/8-mile) east of the village of Sergy with the support of continuous fire from the 119th Field Artillery. After hard fighting, the 32nd Infantry Division advanced a mile, broke into two important positions in the new German line of resistance, and captured them. Reddy Farm and Hill 230 were both captured on 1 August 1918, with the support of very active fire from the 119th Field Artillery. Rapid advancements were made on 2 and 3 August. By 10:30 on 3 August 1918, the leading elements of the 32nd Infantry Division had advanced to one-half kilometer (just over 1/4-mile) southwest of the village of Saint-Gilles where they captured Resson Farm. In just a matter of two days the 32nd Infantry Division had advanced from Reddy Farm and captured the villages of Villome and Dravegny, arriving on the outskirts of Saint-Gilles with active fire from the 119th Field Artillery.

On the evening of 3 August 1918, advance elements of the 32nd Infantry Division attempted to cross the Vesle River but the attempt failed due to artillery fire from two 77's and strong machine-gun fire from the German troops on the opposite bank of the river. On 4 August 1918, the 32nd Infantry Division entered the town of Fismes, on the south bank of the Vesle River but did not fully occupy and capture Fismes until 6 August 1918. The 119th Field Artillery pounded the north bank of the Vesle River from 3 August 1918 through 6 August 1918 in an attempt to help the 32nd Infantry Division construct bridges to cross the river; however the German machine-gun and artillery fire was too strong to allow American troops to approach the river without sustaining heavy casualties.

Despite having several artillery pieces destroyed by German counter-battery fire, the 119th Field Artillery had helped the 32nd Infantry Division drive the Germans back negating the gains they had made during their Spring Offensive. The 32nd Infantry Division had marched 19 kilometers (11.875 miles) in just over seven days, capturing significant territory. The Germans were finally able to hold their ground and stop the allied advance on 6 August 1918 bringing an end to the Aisne–Marne counter-offensive.

=== Oise–Aisne offensive ===
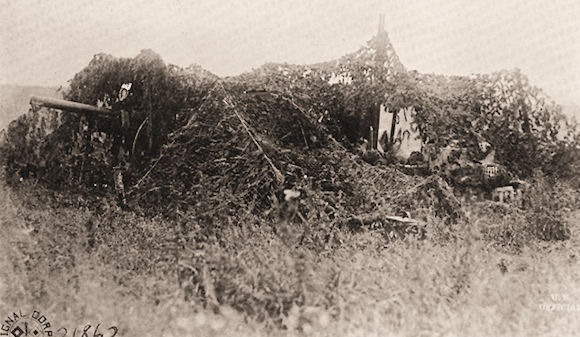
Canon de 75 modèle 1897 of Battery E, 119th Field Artillery Regiment during shelling of the village of Fismettes.

By 7 August 1918, the 28th Infantry Division occupied the town of Fismes, relieving the 32nd Infantry Division but the 119th Field Artillery remained in place to assist the 28th Infantry Division in further advances. Over the next two days, the 119th Field Artillery continued to pound the village of Fismettes which is directly across the Vesle River from the town of Fismes. This allowed the 28th Infantry Division to send four companies across the Vesle River on 8 August 1918 to establish bridgeheads on the north bank and occupy the southern and eastern parts of Fismettes. During the early morning of 9 August 1918, the 28th Infantry Division advanced one battalion across the Vesle River and captured Fismette establishing outposts occupying the heights to the north of the village. The 119th Field Artillery used well-placed barrages to repulse two counterattacks by the Germans at 16:00 and at 22:45. On 10 August 1918, the 119th Field Artillery commenced box barrages to prevent the Germans from escaping the plateau between the Vesle and Aisne Rivers. The 28th Infantry Division sent out small aggressive patrols under the cover of the artillery barrages to feel out the German line and to allow for broadening of the bridgeheads. Patrols continued to be sent out through 12 August 1918, supported by artillery fire from the 119th Field Artillery to determine if the Germans held the north bank of the Vesle River in force.

On 13 August 1918, the 119th Field Artillery came under the command of the 77th Infantry Division and remained in place directing artillery fire along the north bank of the Vesle River. By 15 August 1918, the patrols all reported that the north bank of the Vesle was held in sufficient force by the Germans to require a major operation. That operation would be known as the Oise–Aisne offensive. On 21 August 1918, the 119th Field artillery, directed advance fire, assisting in the capture of the village of Tannerie by a company from the 77th Infantry Division .

The 32nd Infantry Division was personally selected by General Charles Mangin to assist the French Tenth Army in a flank attack on the German front lines and on the evening of 24 August 1918, the 119th Field Artillery was billeted in the town of Neuilly-Saint-Front on their way to rejoin the 32nd Infantry Division. The soldiers of the 119th Field Artillery Regiment marched 140 kilometers (87 miles) over four days and by 28 August 1918, had rejoined the 32nd Infantry Division in the front line west of the village of Juvigny. On 27 August 1918, orders were received to immediately commence destructive artillery fire on the wire entanglements, trenches and important points of the German lines, up to the limits of the range of the heavy artillery. The 119th Field Artillery was ordered to harass the Germans day and night with both continued and irregular artillery fire to disorganize their defenses in preparation for forthcoming attacks. The artillery fire was to continue through the evening of 28 August 1918 and not allow the Germans any respite, disrupting communications all along the front and rear lines and as deep into German territory as the artillery would allow. On 28 August 1918, the 32nd Infantry Division attacked and by 29 August, it had advanced to within one kilometer (5/8-mile) of Juvigny.

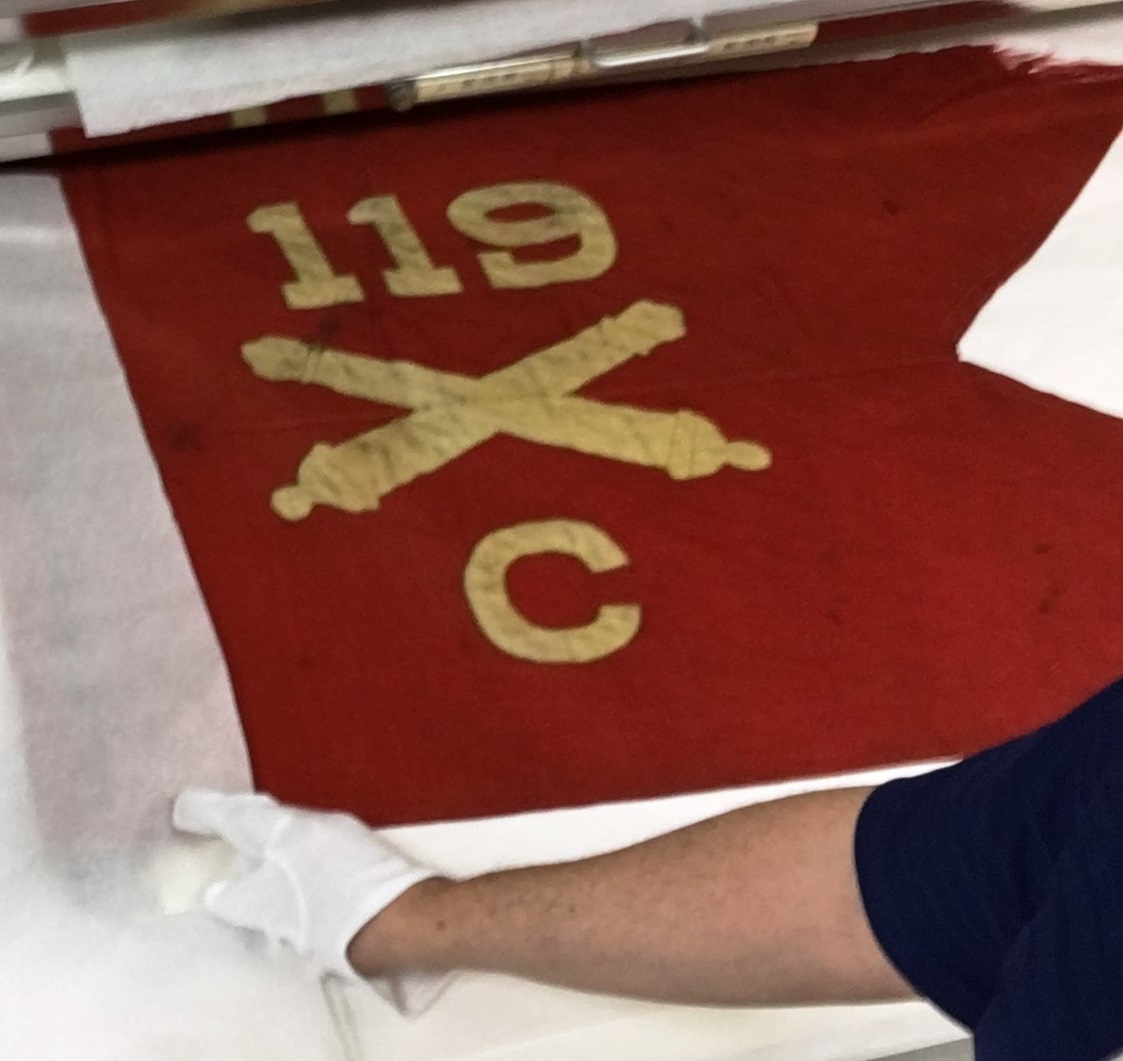
Guidon of Battery C, 119th Field Artillery Regiment from World War I

During the evening of 29 August 1918, the Germans pulled their troops back from their left flank. In response, orders were sent on 30 August 1918, to the 32nd Infantry Division to attack and capture the village of Juvigny. The 119th Field Artillery was directed to concentrate its artillery fire east of Juvigny. Even with their fallback, the Germans had left several strongly fortified outposts along the line and the village of Juvigny was strongly held by the Germans. The 32nd Infantry Division quickly overcame the German's advance posts but was slowed down by well-placed German machine guns near the village of Juvigny. The Germans attempted a counterattack but were foiled by a two-pronged attack from the west and the south by the 32nd Infantry Division. By nightfall, the Americans had captured the village of Juvigny and had breached the German front lines between two German army corps. The capture of Juvigny by the American 32nd Infantry Division contributed greatly to the success of attacks the next day by other elements of the French XXX Corps.

Commander Colonel Chester McCormick, commander of the 119th Field Artillery Regiment, wrote the following in a letter to his soldiers in recounting the battle near Juvingy.

"I consider the selection and occupation of position in and about Juvigny on the night of September 2nd, one of the most noteworthy features of our career as without any daylight reconnaissance, the battalions moved out into the unknown country after dark and were in position serving their guns near the village of Juvigny before daylight."

Due to the rapid advance of the 32nd Infantry Division during the night of 30 August 1918, they were tasked with capturing a ridge 300 meters (984 feet) east of the village of Terny-Sorny. On 31 August 1918, the 119th Field Artillery bombarded the Germans for four hours, from 12:00 to 16:00, in preparation for a resumed attack by the 32nd Infantry Division. A rolling artillery barrage commenced at 15:55 and at 16:00 the 32nd Infantry Division began its advance eastward from Juvigny. The Germans put up stiff resistance at Beaumont Farm and shelled the Americans left flank with mortars. The Americans continued to drive through the German lines and captured the Bethancourt-Terny Road. By 18:45 the lead troops of the 32nd Infantry Division had entered the village of Terny-Sorny and by 21:30 the ridge to the east of the village had been taken. The aggressive tactics by the 32nd Infantry Division, and its units, allowed it to capture the plateau around the village of Terny where the Allies could concentrate fire on the village of Laffaux. If the Allies were able to capture Laffaux, the Germans would be forced to abandon the line along the Vesle River.

During the evening of 1 September 1918, the 32nd Infantry Division was relieved from the front line by the 1st Moroccan Infantry Division and the French 66th Infantry Division. On 2 September 1918, the 119th Field Artillery was placed under the command of the 1st Moroccan Infantry Division through 6 September 1918 to assist their advance towards the village of Vauxaillon and then onwards towards a hill east of the village of Quincy-Basse. The officers and enlisted men of the 119th Field Artillery gained the respect of The French Artillery Commander of the 1st Moroccan Division due to the prevalence of their determined spirit despite the challenge of the battle. On 6 September 1918, the 119th Field Artillery was relieved from the front lines for much-needed rest and reequipping. On 7 September 1918, the 119th Field Artillery completed movement to the rear at the village of Chelles and was held in reserve for the French Tenth Army. This was the end of their involvement in the Oise–Aisne offensive. On 9 September 1918, the 119th Field Artillery moved with the 32nd Infantry Division to the vicinity of the town of Joinville for training.

=== Military decorations ===
The 32nd Infantry Division was under the control of the French Tenth Army almost since they had arrived in France. The commander of the French Tenth Army, General Charles Mangin, awarded all four infantry regiments, all three artillery regiments and all three machine gun battalions of the 32nd Infantry Division with a Croix de Guerre for distinguishing themselves in battle. In recognition of their military successes during the Aisne–Marne and Oise–Aisne offensives, the 119th Field Artillery was awarded the Croix de Guerre with a silver star. The streamer is embroidered "AISNE–MARNE and OISE–AISNE". The Headquarters Battery of the 119th Field Artillery was awarded an extra Croix de Guerre with Palm (two orders of precedence higher than Croix de Guerre with a silver star) for their exceptional planning during the Oise–Aisne offensive. The streamer is embroidered "OISE–AISNE".

=== Meuse–Argonne offensive ===
In preparation of the Meuse–Argonne offensive, (one part of a massive campaign known as the Hundred Days Offensive) and under orders from General John Pershing, commander-in-chief of the American Expeditionary Forces, all movement of troops were to be performed with the utmost secrecy under the cover of darkness without lights. On 16 September 1918, the soldiers of the 119th Field Artillery began a seven-night march through the mud and rain from the town of Joinville to the vicinity of the village of Avocourt to join the 79th Infantry Division. The long marches were a severe test on the morale of the soldiers of the 119th Field Artillery and by the time they arrived near Avocourt on 24 September 1918, the horses towing the artillery were weak and exhausted. General Petain, the État-major des armées, (Chief of the Defence Staff) ordered the Meuse–Argonne offensive would commence on 26 September 1918.

The place in the front line where the 79th Infantry Division was set to make its attack was in the same area where a half million soldiers from the French and German Armies had perished in the Battle of Verdun in 1916. At 23:30, on 25 September 1918, the 119th Field Artillery commenced harassing and interdiction fire at the German front lines. At 2:30, on 26 September 1918, the 119th Field Artillery participated in a three-hour artillery barrage of German positions in preparation for the initial infantry assault. At 5:30, under the protection of a rolling barrage from the 119th Field Artillery, the 79th Infantry Division attacked and advanced toward the village of Montfaucon. The advance of the 79th Infantry Division was hindered by machine-gun fire during the entire afternoon stalling their advance. The resistance by the Germans in the vicinity of Montfaucon was so deadly that the 79th Infantry Division had to wait for the 119th Field Artillery before they could advance further. The guns of the 119th Field Artillery were delayed in advancing due to the poor conditions of the roads over an area that used to be "No Man's Land" and the congestion on those roads that could be utilized. By the end of the day the 79th Infantry Division had captured the villages of Haucourt and Malancourt and reached a line one—half kilometer (just over 1/4-mile) north of Malancourt and along the northeastern edge of the Bois de Cuisy (Cuisy Woods).

On 27 September 1918, the 79th Infantry Division was eventually able to capture Montfaucon and establish a line one-half kilometer (just over 1/4-mile) northwest of the village. On 28 September 1918, the 79th Infantry Division advanced further and captured the village of Nantillois. The advance of the 119th Field Artillery continued with the forward movement of the 79th Infantry Division but the hauling of the artillery and supplies was hampered again by the conditions of the roads. On 29 September 1918, the 79th Infantry Division resumed the attack but was finally forced into a defensive position along a ridge 300 m northwest of the village of Nantillois.

Commander Colonel Chester McCormick wrote the following in his letter to his soldiers in regards to the start of the Meuse–Argonne offensive.

"Here the batteries suffered one of the most trying ordeals of their experience in the war. Occupying what [was an] impossible position in the face of terrible destructive fire of the enemy with its toll of death, you, without flinching, again demonstrated, as on the Marne, that indomitable dogged spirit of true artillery and stuck to your guns."

On 30 September 1918, the 119th Division was transferred to the command of the 3rd Infantry Division while they waited for their own artillery due to the conditions of the roads. Orders from the American First Army Headquarters instructed all artillery batteries to use Number 5 Shell (a lethal gas mixture of phosgene and smoke) west of the Meuse River on favorable targets and under favorable weather. The 3rd Infantry Division attacked on 4 October 1918 and advanced one kilometer (5/8-mile) along the entire front, supported by rolling barrages from the 119th Field artillery. On 6 October 1918, the artillery for the 3rd Infantry Division finally arrived and the 119th Field Artillery was transferred back to the sector of the 32nd Infantry Division. With assistance from the 119th Field Artillery, the 32nd Infantry Division was able to smash its way forward and break through the 8 miles deep Hindenburg Line which had resisted numerous Allied breakthrough attempts ever since the Battle of Arras in April 1917. Beginning on 9 October 1918, the 32nd Infantry Division advanced north and captured the villages of Gesnes, Cote Dame Marie, Romagne-sous-Montfaucon and Bantheville. By 19 October 1918, the 32nd Infantry Division advanced their line one—half kilometer (just over 1/4-mile) north of Romagne-sous-Montfaucon completing the breakthrough of the Hindenburg Line.

On 20 October 1918, the 89th Infantry Division relieved the 32nd Infantry Division from the front line. The 119th Field Artillery stayed in place to support the 89th Infantry Division. On 20 October 1918, the 89th Infantry Division cleared the enemy from the woods around the village of Bantheville despite a fierce resistance by the Germans and established a defensive line along the northern and western edges of the woods. The 89th Infantry Division spent several days consolidating their position and did not attack again until 1 November 1918. On that day, the 119th Field Artillery launched one of the best organized and most dominant artillery attacks delivered on the western front assisting the 89th Infantry Division in smashing through the German defenses gaining 11 kilometers (6.8 miles) of territory, cutting German communications into Belgium and breaking the backbone of the German resistance. Over the next several days, the 89th Infantry Division advanced rapidly and captured the villages of Remonville, Barricourt, Tailly, Nouart, Beauclair, and Beaufort-en-Argonne.

On 3 November 1918, the 119th Field Artillery was relieved from the front lines to rejoin the 32nd Infantry Division for some much-needed rest, recuperation and re-equipping. After five months of near-continuous fighting, the 119th Field Artillery had assisted in smashing the way for seven American infantry divisions, the French Tenth Army and the 1st Moroccan Infantry Division, recovering a total of 70 kilometers (43 miles) of French territory. The soldiers of the 119th Field Artillery were tired and worn mentally from the exposure and exhaustion; however, their regiment had been finally rendered immobile from the loss of horses. Of the 1,459 horses the 119th Field Artillery received during the war, only 327 survived with the rest either being killed, wounded or lost from all causes. An 11:00 on 11 November 1918, the armistice that ended World War I went into effect.

Commander Colonel McCormick's letter to his soldiers concluded with the following poignant message.

"You may well feel proud of the distinguished service you have rendered. The record of the regiment stands out brilliantly, equaled by few, if any. Although our casualties have been heavy as compared with other regiments of artillery, considering the hazardous service rendered I consider we have been extremely fortunate but more so to good discipline and judgment of both officers and men. The missions entrusted to you have been ably performed with a spirit of cheerfulness and steadfast self-sacrifice and devotion to duty, serving under conditions of extreme hardship and danger, you have acquitted yourselves in a highly gratifying and satisfactory manner. During the long marches covering over one thousand kilometers, and periods of exposure and hunger, you have accepted all as a matter of duty, even to your conduct and behavior in the rear areas after the armistice where the mental stress was worse than front line combat, you seemed always imbued with that indomitable spirit of "Let's Go."

Let us pause in reverence to our immortal dead who by their courageous sacrifice have permitted us to return victorious in honor. May their souls rest in peace. It has indeed been an honor to command you. I thank you for your loyal support and congratulate you upon your success."

== Interwar Period 1919–1941 ==
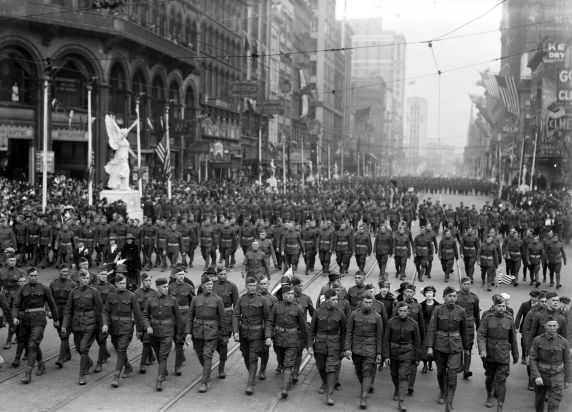
Members of the 119th Field Artillery Regiment march in a parade through downtown Detroit after returning from France in 1919.

After the armistice went into effect, the 119th Field artillery was transferred to the 40th Infantry Division on 15 November 1918 and relocated to the village of Revigny where a regional replacement depot had been established. On 23 November 1918, the 119th Field Artillery was relieved from assignment to the 40th Infantry Division and fell under the direct control of the First Army where they were granted a two-day respite to enjoy the Christmas holiday. On the evening of 25 December 1918, the 119th Field Artillery made its way to the village of Gondrecourt for training and was transferred to the authority of the 88th Infantry Division through 8 April 1919.

The 119th Field Artillery made a ten-day journey to the port city of Brest to rejoin the 32nd Infantry Division on 18 April 1919 in preparation for their return to the United States. On 25 April 1919, the 119th Field Artillery boarded the S.S. Frederick for their return home where they arrived at the New York Port of Embarkation on 3 May 1919. On 16 May 1919, the 119th Field Artillery was demobilized at Camp Custer, Michigan. Commander Colonel McCormick named many terrain features at Camp Grayling after French locations where the 119th Field Artillery were in combat. Some of the named locations are: Red Arrow Hill, Juvigny Hill, and the Cote Dame Marie hill range.

The 119th Field Artillery's proud record of achievements during World War I led the Army to decide that their namesake could not be allowed to pass into history and must be carried on. So in 1921, the 119th Field Artillery was reconstituted in the National Guard and allotted to the state of Michigan. Sometime in June 1921, the 119th Field Artillery was assigned to the 32nd Infantry Division. On 22 June 1921, the 1st Battalion, 119th Field Artillery was organized and federally recognized at Lansing, Michigan. On 12 October 1921, the 2nd Battalion, 119th Field Artillery was organized and federally recognized at Jackson, Michigan. The regimental headquarters unit was organized and federally recognized on 10 February 1922 at Lansing, Michigan and Colonel Joseph H. Lewis was selected to be the next commander of the 119th Field Artillery. On 1 August 1933, the 119th Field Artillery was converted from horse-drawn to truck-drawn artillery.

The 119th Field Artillery conducted annual summer training most years at Camp Grayling, Michigan. However, some years, annual summer training was conducted at Camp Custer, Michigan. The 119th Field Artillery conducted joint summer training at Camp Grayling, Michigan with the 329th Field Artillery in 1928, 1932 and 1937 and with the 328th Field Artillery in 1929 and 1936. The 119th Field Artillery participated in Second Army Maneuvers held out of Camp Custer, Michigan from 8 to 22 August 1936.

Michigan Army National Guard soldiers stop a car and question its driver outside of the entrance to the Fisher Body plant during the Auto Workers Strike in Flint, Michigan.

=== Auto workers strike – Flint Michigan ===
On 30 December 1936, the automobile workers of the General Motors Fisher Number One Plant in Flint, Michigan sat down on the job. The union workers were tired of reductions in pay, jobs, increased workloads, and harassment. The workers refused to work or leave the Fisher One and Two plants, and later on the Chevrolet Number 4 plant as well. General Motors attempted to expel the workers by shutting off the heat and electricity to the plants and preventing food deliveries. Violent clashes erupted between the striking workers, General Motors "enforcers", and the police.

In response, Michigan Governor, Frank Murphy, called up the Michigan Army National Guard to keep the peace outside the plant. Elements of the 119th Field Artillery were called up on 13 January 1936 to perform riot control duty in Flint, Michigan.

On 11 February 1937, General Motors reached a temporary agreement with the United Auto Workers and ended the most famous labor strike in American history. Five days later on 16 February 1937, the 119th Field Artillery were recalled after calm had been restored in Flint, Michigan. Governor, Frank Murphy commended the 119th Field Artillery and the rest of the Michigan National Guard, especially the officers, for their skill with which they conducted themselves and the manner in which they handled matters.

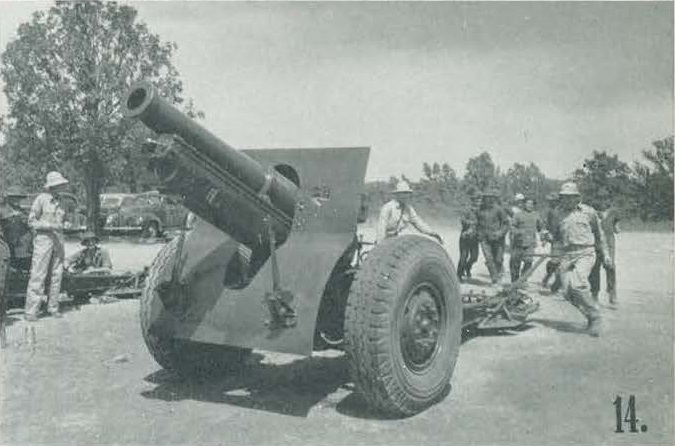
A M114 155mm howitzer used during training at Fort Leonard Wood, Missouri in 1941

Colonel Glenn W. Carey was appointed the next commander of the 119th Field Artillery in January 1939. The 119th Field Artillery participated in Second Army Maneuvers held out of Camp McCoy, Wisconsin from 4 to 27 August 1940. The 119th Field Artillery was relieved from their assignment to the 57th Field Artillery Brigade, 32nd Infantry Division on 18 September 1940 and reassigned to the 72nd Field Artillery Brigade which was directly attached to the V Corps without being attached to an Infantry Division. During this reorganization the 119th Field Artillery added a third battalion when the Headquarters and Headquarters Battery, Third Battalion, was organized. On 11 October 1940, the 119th Field Artillery changed their armament from 75-mm guns to 155-mm guns.

The 119th Field Artillery was inducted into federal service on 7 April 1941 at Lansing, Michigan and was moved to Fort Knox, Kentucky, where it arrived on 17 April 1941. The 119th Field Artillery was then transferred to Fort Leonard Wood, Missouri on 2 June 1941. The 119th Field Artillery participated in joint maneuvers with the Second Army and VII Corps out of Camp Robinson, Arkansas from 11 to 30 August 1941.

== World War II ==
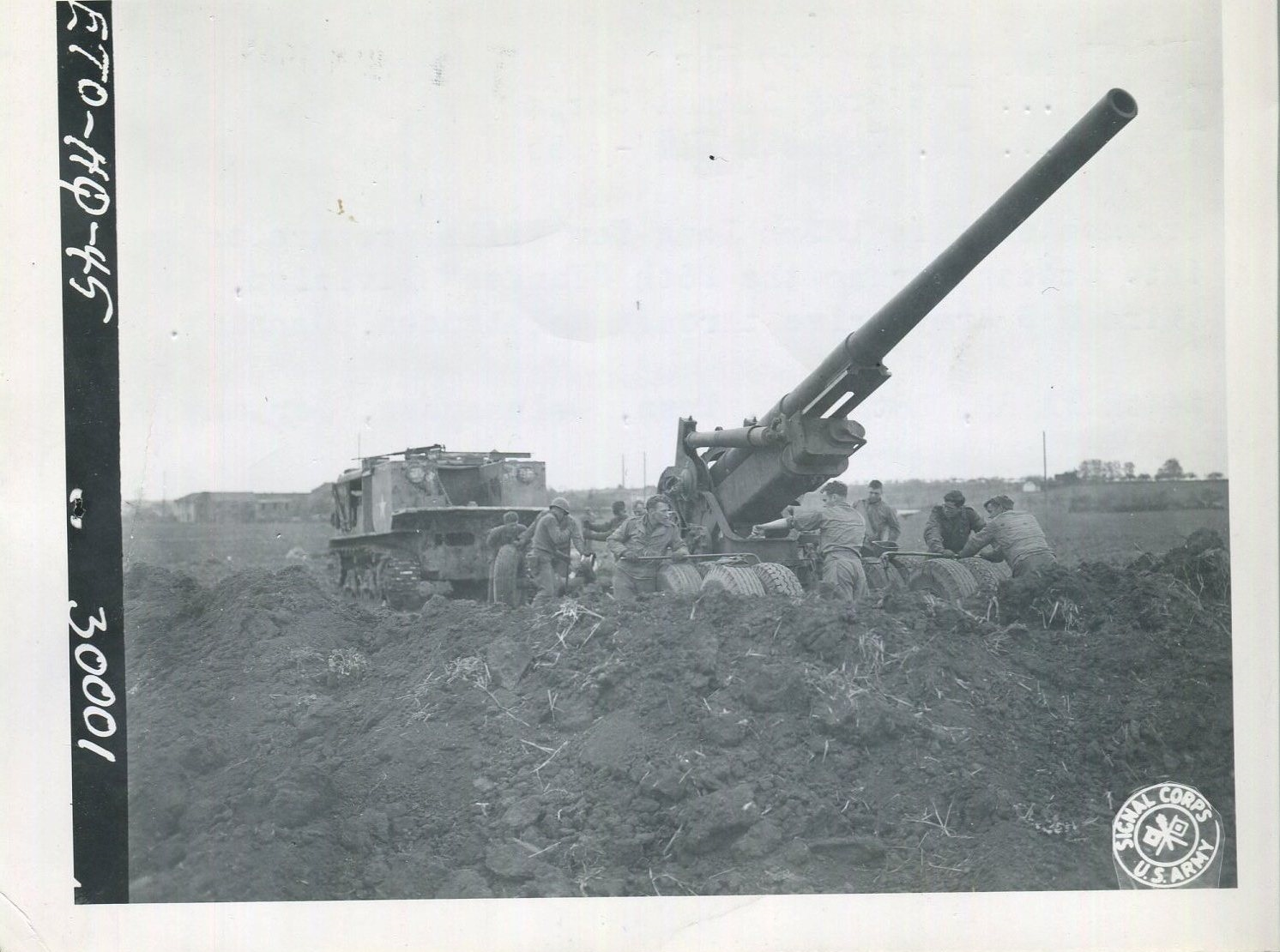
The 119th Field Artillery Regiment used the M1A1 155mm gun during World War II. Nicknamed the "Long Tom", this gun fired a 127-pound shell to a range of 13.2 miles (21.2 km).

The United States declared war on Germany on 11 December 1941 four days after the Japanese attack on Pearl Harbor and on the same day that Germany declared war on the United States. Colonel Lloyd M. Hanna was appointed the new commander of the 119th Field Artillery on 16 February 1942. In 1943, the United States Army decided to restructure the non-divisional field artillery to increase their flexibility and response times during combat. The 119th Field Artillery had been a non-divisional field artillery unit since they were separated from the 32nd Infantry Division on 18 September 1940. The regiment was broken up on 8 February 1943, and its elements were reorganized and redesignated. The old Headquarters and Headquarters Battery was renamed to Headquarters and Headquarters Battery, 119th Field Artillery Group. The 1st Battalion was renamed the 978th Field Artillery Battalion. The 2nd Battalion was renamed the 979th Field Artillery Battalion.

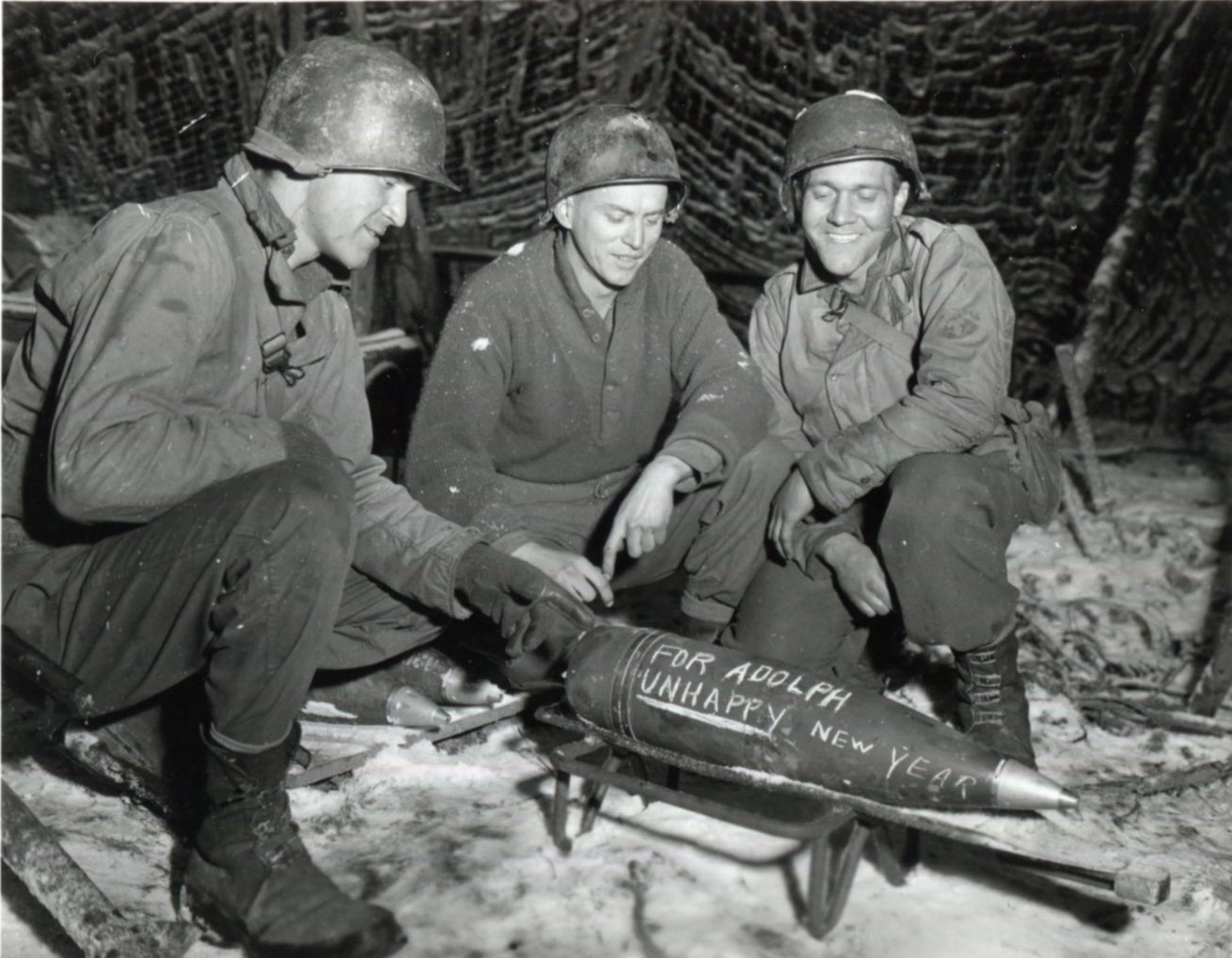
A 155mm shell used in WWII with inscription.

The 119th Field Artillery Group was transferred to Camp Young, California on 23 August 1943 for training. Prior to overseas deployment, the 119th Field Artillery Group moved to Camp Myles Standish, Massachusetts on 5 February 1944 for staging until they departed from the Boston Port of Embarkation on 27 February 1944. The 119th Field Artillery Group arrived in England on 8 March 1944 where they waited for the invasion of Normandy to begin.

Once the allies had established a safe and secure beachhead to allow for heavy artillery to come ashore, the 119th Field Artillery Group landed in France on 26 June 1944 where they participated in the Normandy and Northern France Campaigns. The 119th Field Artillery Group crossed into Belgium on 8 September 1944 and then into the Netherlands five days later on 13 September 1944. The 119th Field Artillery Group participated in the Rhineland Campaign and entered Germany on 14 October 1944. As the war progressed the 119th Field Artillery Group also participated in Ardennes-Alsace and Central Europe Campaigns. From 5 April 1945 to 7 April 1945, the 119th Field Artillery Group was very briefly attached to the 95th Infantry Division where it helped in capturing the city of Hamm and the town of Kamen in Germany. On 7 May 1945, General Alfred Jodl, Chief of the Operations Staff for the German Armed Forces High Command, signed an unconditional surrender document that ordered all German troops to surrender on 8 May 1945 bringing an end to World War II on the European Western Front.

== Post World War II ==
In August 1945, the 119th Field Artillery Group was stationed in the town of Ortenberg, Germany. The 119th Field Artillery Group arrived back in the United States on 16 November 1945 at the Hampton Roads Port of Embarkation. The Headquarters and Headquarters Battery, 119th Field Artillery Group was inactivated on the same day at Camp Patrick Henry, Virginia. The 978th Field Artillery Battalion had arrived back in the United States ahead of the 119th Field Artillery Group at the Boston Port of Embarkation and was inactivated on 30 October 1945 at Camp Myles Standish, Massachusetts. The two inactivated units were consolidated, reorganized and federally recognized on 15 December 1946 as the 119th Field Artillery Battalion with headquarters at Lansing, Michigan. The newly consolidated 119th Field Artillery Battalion was assigned to the 46th Infantry Division.

The 979th Field Artillery Battalion had also arrived back in the United States ahead of the 119th Field Artillery Group at the New York Port of Embarkation and was inactivated on 29 October 1945 at Camp Kilmer, New Jersey. An unrelated unit, the 943rd Field Artillery Battalion was inactivated on 28 November 1945 at Camp Shanks, New York. These two inactivated units were consolidated, reorganized, and federally recognized on 6 December 1946 as the 943rd Field Artillery Battalion with headquarters at Jackson, Michigan, and assigned to the 46th Infantry Division.

=== Combat Arms Regimental System ===
In the late 1950s, the United States Army was concerned about maintaining the continuity of distinguished combat units without restricting future organizational trends. Over the course of two world wars, the United States Army had broken up, reorganized, consolidated, or disbanded many units and many more new units were created while organizations with long combat records remained inactive. As a result, soldiers often served in units with little or no history. In order to preserve the history of distinguished combat units, Secretary of the Army, Wilber M. Brucker approved the Combat Arms Regimental System (CARS) on 24 January 1957.

In accordance with CARS, the 119th Field Artillery Battalion and the 943rd Field Artillery Battalion were consolidated on 15 March 1959 to form the 119th Artillery, a parent regiment under the Combat Arms Regimental System. The new 119th Artillery consisted of the 1st, 2nd, and 3rd Howitzer Battalions which remained elements of the 46th Infantry Division.

The Combat Arms Regimental System called for each artillery regiment to be assigned a headquarters at a permanent location to maintain the regimental history, traditions, and records while also displaying the regimental colors, trophies, and other properties of the regiment. However, the organization of regimental headquarters under CARS was suspended indefinitely, and each regimental headquarters remained at zero strength under the control of the Department of the Army. Pending the establishment of regimental headquarters in the future, the lowest-numbered or lettered active element in each regiment was to retain custody of the regimental colors and properties. Therefore, this duty fell to the 1st Howitzer Battalion of the new 119th Artillery and they maintained custody of the regimental colors and properties.

Over the next decade the 119th Artillery was downsized on two occasions. The first downsizing occurred on 15 March 1963. The 119th Artillery was reorganized to consist of only the 1st and 2nd Battalions (the 3rd Battalion was eliminated) and dropped the Howitzer designation while still remaining as elements of the 46th Infantry Division.

=== Detroit riots of 1967 ===
Michigan Army National Guard soldiers outside Economy Printing building during the 1967 Detroit riots

Around 3:30 on 23 July 1967, officers of the Detroit Police Department conducted a raid on an unlicensed speakeasy being run by Bill Scott II out of the offices of the United Community League for Civic Action on the second floor of the Economy Printing building. The police officers found a party of 82 people celebrating two black soldiers who just returned from serving in the Vietnam War. Over the next hour, as the police officers were removing the partygoers from the building, a large crowd began to gather outside and started to riot. Over the next day the riot escalated quickly and became so violent that Michigan Governor, George W. Romney, called up the Michigan National Guard on 24 July 1967.

Michigan Army National Guard soldiers protect Detroit Firefighters during the 1967 Detroit Riots

The 1st and 2nd Battalions of the 119th Artillery were at Camp Grayling, Michigan conducting annual training. The training was cancelled and the troops were quickly flown to Detroit in the very early hours of 24 July 1967 to help restore order. Later that same day as the situation in Detroit worsened, the President of the United States, Lyndon B. Johnson, signed an executive order authorizing the Secretary of Defense, Robert S. McNamara, to federalize the Michigan National Guard. Task Force Detroit was created and the 119th Artillery and the Michigan National Guard were joined by a brigade each from the 82nd and 101st Airborne Divisions under the command of Lieutenant General John L. Throckmorton.

The task force cracked down on the rioters and by 29 July 1967, the situation in Detroit was calm enough to pull out the 82nd and 101st Airborne Divisions and leave the city in the hands of the federalized Michigan National Guard. On 2 August 1967, the 1st and 2nd Battalions of the 119th Artillery were released from active federal service and reverted to Michigan State control and returned to Camp Grayling.

During the 1960s, the United States Department of Defense investigated the manpower and redundancy involved in maintaining two reserve components of the Army: the United States National Guard and the United States Army Reserve. In 1967, Secretary of Defense, Robert S. McNamara, decided that 15 combat divisions in the Army National Guard were unnecessary and he reduced the number of divisions down to 8 but increased the number of brigades up from 7 to 18. This resulted in no change to the total strength of the Army National Guard.

As a result of this restructuring the 46th Infantry Division was reduced to the 46th Infantry Brigade and it was assigned to the 38th Infantry Division. At the same time the 119th Artillery was downsized for the second time in the decade. The 119th Artillery was reorganized on 1 February 1968 to consist of only the 1st Battalion (the 2nd Battalion was eliminated). The 119th Artillery was still attached to the 46th Infantry even though it had downsized from a division to a brigade. Therefore, the 119th Artillery was assigned to the 38th Infantry Division by means of being attached to the new 46th Infantry Brigade. Four years later on 1 February 1972, the 119th Artillery was redesignated as the 119th Field Artillery.

In 1984, the United States Army expanded the Combat Arms Regimental System (CARS) to include the non-combat arms branches of the Army. This new system was branded United States Army Regimental System (USARS) and the Combat Arms Regimental System ceased to exist. In accordance with USARS, the 119th Artillery was reorganized and redesignated on 20 February 1987 as the 119th Field Artillery Regiment.

On 24 March 2001, the 1st Battalion, 119th Field Artillery deployed as an entire battalion out of state for the first time in over two decades. Over 300 members from the 1st Battalion deployed to the Fort Irwin National Training Center in California for a 20-day Division Capstone Exercise. The exercise called for the 119th Field Artillery to act as the opposing force (OPFOR). This exercise was also the first time the 119th Field Artillery had to interpret coded digital battle orders instead of using traditional voice communications.

== Post 9/11 ==
The day after the 11 September attacks, about 100 soldiers out of Lansing Michigan of the 1st Battalion, 119th Field Artillery were called up to provide security for the two international border crossings in Detroit; the Ambassador Bridge and the Detroit–Windsor Tunnel. Elements of the 1st Battalion were also called upon to assist the United States Customs and Border Protection with security at the Blue Water Bridge in Port Huron, Michigan. The soldiers of the 1st Battalion were tasked with the mission of searching trucks crossing the border on either of the two bridges or via the Detroit-Windsor Tunnel. The soldiers of the 1st Battalion were stationed on the Canada–United States border until July 2002.

In response to the demands of the war on terror, the United States Army reorganized its divisions including those of the United States National Guard. The plan was to create lighter formations that could be deployed to areas of conflict more rapidly than before. The 119th Field Artillery Regiment was reorganized on 1 September 2003 to consist of the 1st Battalion and now became an element of the 42nd Infantry Division.

=== Guantanamo Bay Naval Base ===
Guantanamo Bay Naval Base has been leased perpetually from Cuba since 1903 when it was established. In 2002, a detention camp was built on the Guantanamo Bay Naval Base to house over 600 prisoners from the war on terror. The duties of providing security at United States military facilities had been traditionally handled by the Military Police Corps; however, ever since the 11 September attacks, the demand for military security had risen to the point where there were no more military police units available. Therefore, American military units with specialties not currently in need were retrained to provide security. The 1st Battalion, 119th Field Artillery Regiment was one of those units whose artillery skills were not currently in demand so they were retrained to provide security.

On 3 December 2003, over 200 soldiers from 1st Battalion, 119th Field Artillery departed Michigan for deployment at Fort Dix, New Jersey. After arrival at Fort Dix, the soldiers of 1st Battalion underwent mission-specific training and in-processing for over a month in preparation for their final destination, Guantanamo Bay Naval Base, Cuba. The soldiers of 1st Battalion arrived at the Guantanamo Bay Naval Base in January 2004 and joined Joint Detention Operation Group in providing security at Camp Delta.

The soldiers of the 1st Battalion, 119th Field Artillery Regiment were assigned the duty of moving the prisoners to and from recreation and shower areas. The soldiers of the 119th Field Artillery Regiment were required to cover their name tags and unit patches with tape to prevent the prisoners from identifying them. The soldiers were not assigned to patrol the same area two days in a row to minimize the chance of being identified by the prisoners. The 119th Field Artillery Regiment was deployed at Guantanamo Bay Naval Base until November 2004 when they returned to Michigan.

=== Operation Iraqi Freedom ===
The Headquarters and Headquarters Battery, 1st Battalion, 119th Field Artillery Regiment deployed to Iraq on 19 December 2004 in support of the 18th Military Police Brigade who had arrived earlier on 30 November 2004. The Headquarters and Headquarters Battery was recognized for their exceptionally meritorious service during their deployment which lasted until 3 November 2005. The Department of the Army awarded the Headquarters and Headquarters Battery with a Meritorious Unit Commendation. The citation reads as follows:

"For exceptionally meritorious service, during the period 30 November 2004 to 3 November 2005, Headquarters and Headquarters Company, 18th Military Police Brigade and its subordinate units displayed exceptionally meritorious service in support of Operation Iraqi Freedom. The unit achieved outstanding success in multiple complicated missions by providing convoy and main supply route security throughout Iraq. In addition, the unit equipped, mentored, and established a federally recognized highway patrol and conducted detention operations for the two largest detention facilities in the Global War on Terror, as well as for all high-value detainees and protected persons throughout Iraq. Headquarters and Headquarters Company, 18th Military Police Brigade's outstanding performance of duty is in keeping with the finest traditions of military service and reflects great credit upon the unit, Multi-National Corps-Iraq, and the United States Army."

=== State funeral of Gerald Ford ===
Gerald Ford, the 38th president of the United States, died on 26 December 2006 at his home in Rancho Mirage, California at the age of 93. Gerald Ford was the only United States president who grew up in Michigan and he was buried at the Gerald R. Ford Presidential Museum in Grand Rapids, Michigan on 3 January 2006. One of Gerald Ford's last wishes was to have the Michigan National Guard serve as the lead military organization providing escort service and full military honors at his funeral instead of the active-duty military which is normally the custom. The 1st Battalion, 119th Field Artillery Regiment fired a 21-gun artillery salute during the interment service.

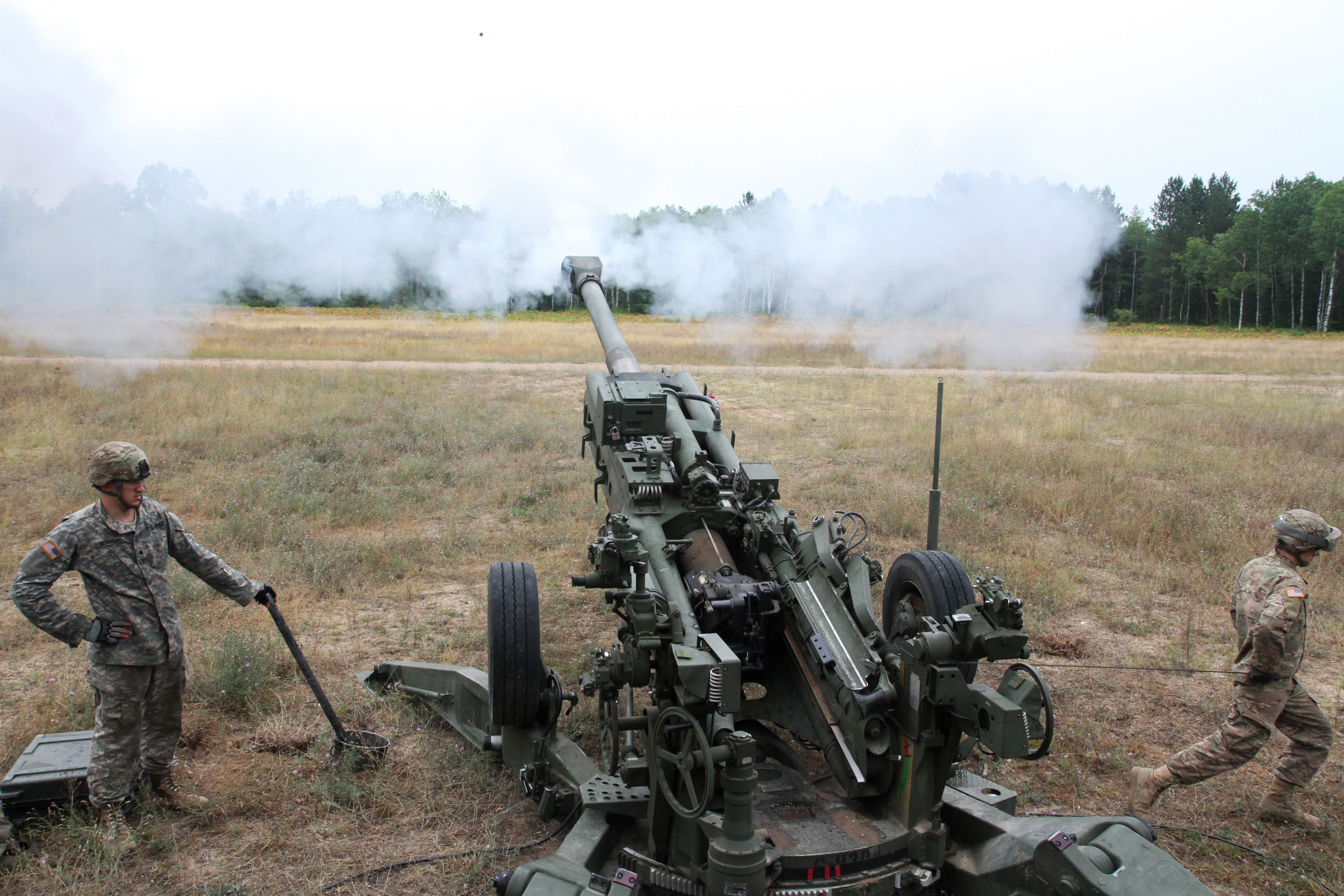
Soldiers from the Charlie Battery, 1st Battalion, 119th Field Artillery Regiment out of Albion, Michigan, take part Exercise Northern Strike at the Camp Grayling.

In March 2014, the 119th Field Artillery Regiment conducted cold-weather training in extreme sub-zero temperatures of negative 30 degrees Fahrenheit (negative 34 degrees Celsius) at Camp Grayling, Michigan. During the mission, the soldiers of the 119th Field Artillery Regiment sling-loaded their M777 155 mm howitzers underneath CH-47 Chinook helicopters being operated by the 147th and 238th Aviation Regiments and then were transported in UH-60 Blackhawk helicopters to their firing points to conduct live-fire training. Due to the arctic-like weather, the soldiers of the 119th Field Artillery Regiment had to overcome machinery that would not operate at 30 degrees below zero. The temperature was so cold that the diesel the soldiers rely on to fuel their vehicles gelled up and froze. A warming bay had to be brought in to allow the soldiers to draw fuel. For their efforts, the soldiers of the 119th Field Artillery Regiment earned cold weather operation training certificates and they learned how to adapt and overcome unexpected situations. The 119th Field Artillery Regiment conducted another round of cold weather training during the winter of 2015.

For two weeks in March 2015 and another two weeks in April 2016, the 119th Field Artillery Regiment deployed to the Adazi Training Center near Riga, Latvia joining over 1600 soldiers from Canada, Finland, Germany, Latvia, and Lithuania for the Summer Shield XII and XIII exercises. During the exercises, the soldiers of the 119th Field Artillery not only trained together but bunked together, to build friendships and continue to strengthen partnerships.

During the first three weeks of August 2016, the 119th Field Artillery Regiment participated in Exercise Northern Strike 16 at Camp Grayling, Michigan. The exercise brought together 5,000 service members from the Army, Air Force, Marine Corps and Special Operations Command from 20 different states and three coalition countries. During training, the soldiers of the 119th Field Artillery Regiment slept in the field close to their weapons so they could be ready to provide artillery fire at a moments notice day or night.

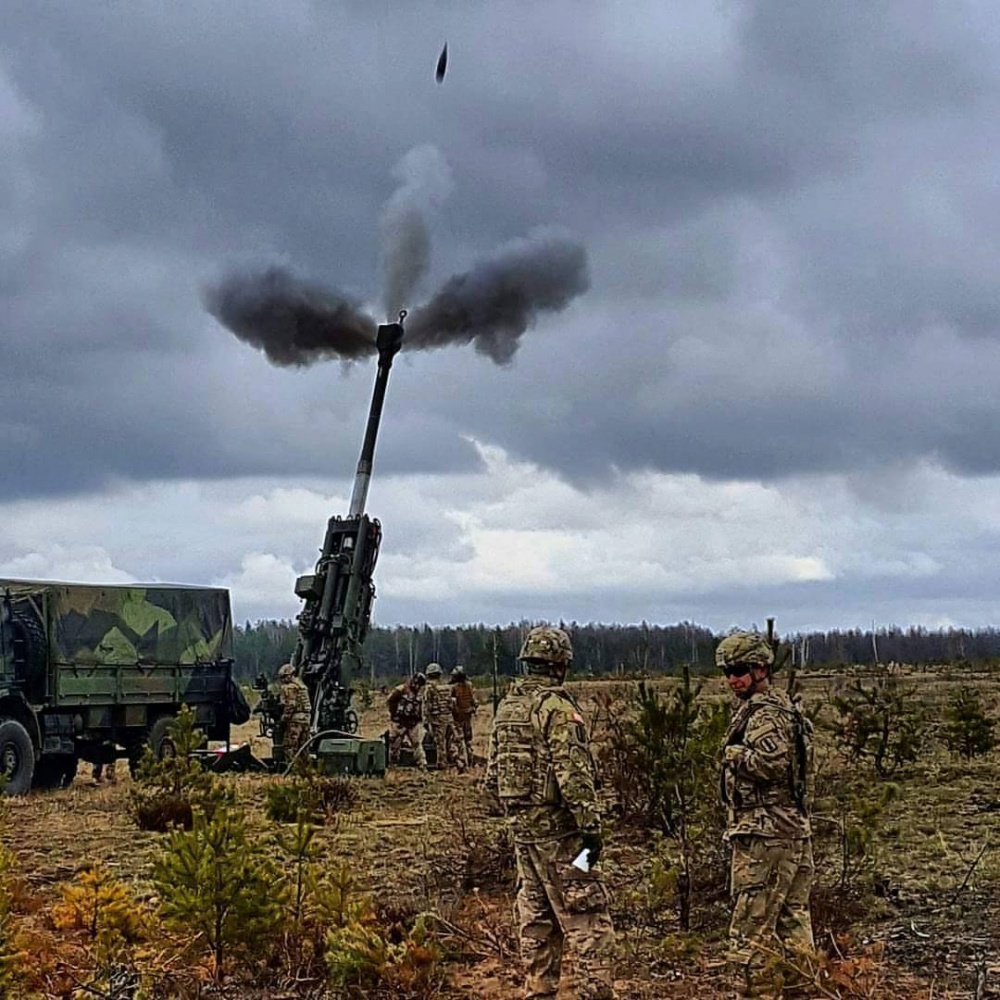
Soldiers of 1-119 FA conduct live-fire training alongside their Latvian counterparts at Adazi Training Center, Latvia, during exercise Summer Shield XIII.

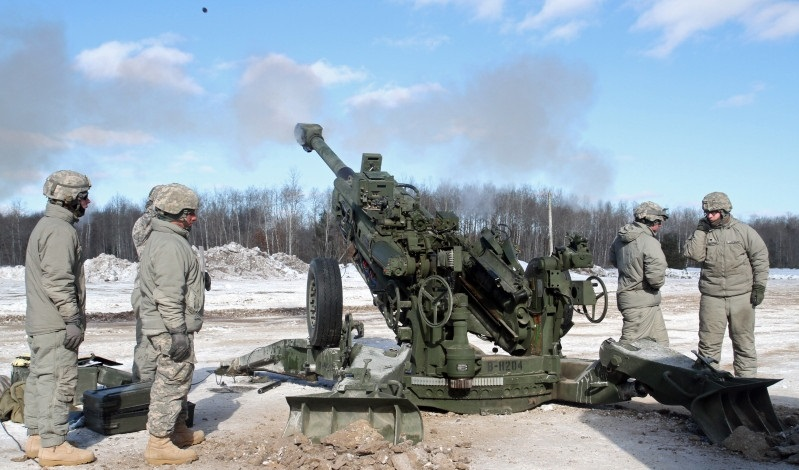
Soldiers of 1-119 FA conducting cold weather live-fire exercise.

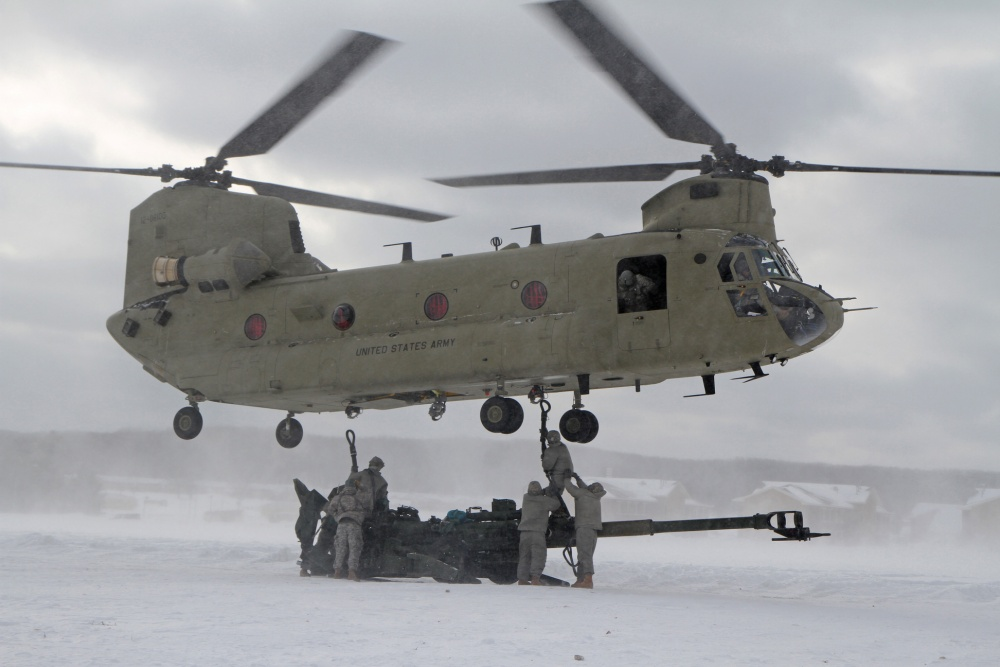
Soldiers of 1-119 FA sling-load an M777 155mm howitzer beneath a CH-47 Chinook at Camp Grayling Michigan on 1 March 2014.

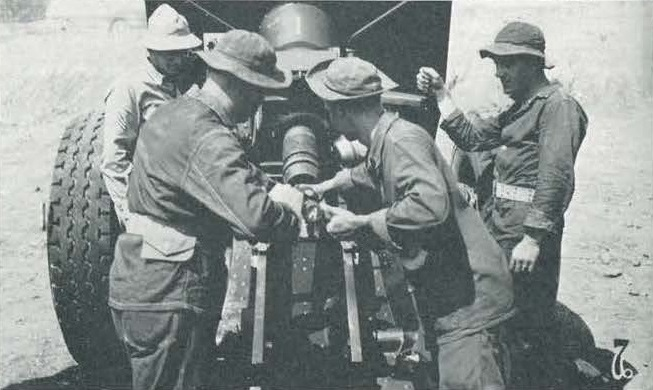
A M114 155 mm howitzer is loaded during training at Fort Leonard Wood, Missouri in 1941

== Campaign and unit award streamers ==
The Department of the Army awards streamers to military units in recognition of a display of heroism or meritorious service that is the result of a group effort or to indicate campaign service during a war. National Guard units are only eligible to be awarded streamers during those times when they are called into active federal duty. A company or battery unit is eligible for a streamer for war service credit only when the rest of the battalion did not participate in the same theater or area of operations during the same war or conflict. The Croix de guerre was awarded by commanders in the French Army and was awarded to individuals and military units of their choice. Military units that were awarded the Croix de guerre are authorized to display streamers with the color and pattern of the medal they were awarded. Each streamer is embroidered with the name of the military campaign and the year(s) of service.

The 119th Field Artillery Regiment was awarded multiple streamers. The Headquarters and Headquarters Battery, 1st battalion, 119th Field Artillery Regiment was awarded streamers in addition to those awarded to the entire regiment. The list of streamers is as follows:

Listed in Order of Precedence
Unit Award Streamers	Award	Awarded to
	Meritorious Unit Commendation	Headquarters and Headquarters Battery, 1st Battalion 119th Field Artillery Regiment
	WWI: Croix de guerre	Headquarters and Headquarters Battery, 1st Battalion 119th Field Artillery Regiment
	WWI: Croix de guerre	119th Field Artillery Regiment

Listed in Order Earned
Campaign Streamers	Campaign	Awarded to
	World War I	119th Field Artillery Regiment
	World War I	119th Field Artillery Regiment
	World War I	119th Field Artillery Regiment
	World War II	119th Field Artillery Regiment
	World War II	119th Field Artillery Regiment
	World War II	119th Field Artillery Regiment
	World War II	119th Field Artillery Regiment
	World War II	119th Field Artillery Regiment

== Structure ==
The 119th Field Artillery Regiment is subordinate to the 272nd Regional Support Group, a component of the Michigan Army National Guard which is a component of the Michigan National Guard. As a parent field artillery regiment, the 119th Field Artillery does not have a headquarters and it is a regiment in name only under the United States Army Regimental System. The 119th Field Artillery Regiment is composed of one battalion consisting of four batteries (equivalent to companies in an infantry battalion). The structure of the regiment is as follows:

1st Battalion, 119th Field Artillery Regiment Lansing Michigan

Headquarters and Headquarters Battery (Lansing, Michigan)
Battery A (Port Huron, Michigan)
Battery B (Alma, Michigan)
Battery C (Albion, Michigan)
Forward Support Company (Augusta, Michigan)

== Heraldry ==
The distinctive unit insignia was originally approved for the 119th Field Artillery Regiment on 17 April 1925. The coat of arms was approved on the following day on 18 April 1925. Both the coat of arms and the distinctive unit insignia were redesignated for the 119th Artillery Regiment on 2 September 1960. They were both again redesignated for the 119th Field Artillery Regiment on 11 July 1972.

=== Description of shield ===
The shield is used on both the coat of arms and the distinctive unit insignia. From The Institute of Heraldry:

"A shield blazoned: Gules, in sinister chief the badge of the First Corps of the Spanish–American War Argent and in base issuant a demi-lion rampant Or; on a canton of the last a bend of the first charged with three alerions of the third."

Note: In the explanation below, left and right are given from the viewer's point of view, in contrast to the view of the person holding the shield, in which case left and right are reversed. Colors were often capitalized in the description.

In plain English: The background color of the shield is "Gules" which means red. The area of the "sinister chief" is the top right of the shield. The "sinister chief" is covered in "the badge" of the "First Corps of the Spanish–American War" in the color "Argent" which means white the color of silver. The "base" is the bottom part of the shield. The "base" has "issuant a demi-lion rampant" which is the top half of a lion standing on one hind foot with one foreleg raised above the other and the head in profile. This "demi-lion rampant" is in the color "Or" which means yellow, the color of gold. The shield has a "canton" which by default is a rectangle placed in the upper left corner of the shield unless otherwise specified. This "canton" is in the color of "the last" which is the last mentioned color "Or", yellow. On this "canton" there is a "bend" which is a diagonal stripe from the upper left to the lower right of the "canton". This "bend" is the color of "the first" meaning the first color mentioned which was "Gules", red. This "bend" is "charged", an emblem is placed, consisting of three "alerions" which are eagles depicted without wings or a beak. These "alerions" are in the color of "the third" which is the third color mentioned "Or", yellow.

=== Symbolism of shield ===
From The Institute of Heraldry:

"The baptism of fire of this regiment occurred in the Toul Sector; this is represented by the canton, the arms of Lorraine. The silver badge of the Second Division of the First Corps of the Spanish–American War is displayed in sinister chief. History shows that for a great many years the district around what is now the City of El Paso, Texas, was known as Ponce de Leon's Ranch, having been settled and colonized by a group of the followers of that explorer, and who named their new home after their leader. The lion issuant is, therefore, taken from Ponce de Leon's crest, to denote service on the Mexican Border at El Paso, Texas."

Explanation: After being federalized for the first time, the 119th Field Artillery Regiment saw its first major military action on 16 June 1918 in World War I near the village of Xivray-et-Marvoisin in the Toul-Boucq Sector as described in the section above on World War I. The Toul-Boucq sector referred to the line that stretched from the town of Toul to the village of Boucq. This area is in the Lorraine Region of France. The flag of Lorraine consists of a yellow background with a red diagonal stripe with three white alerions. This flag is represented on the top left portion of the shield.

The Headquarters Battery of the 119th Field Artillery Regiment can trace its lineage as far back as the American Civil War and the Battle of Bull Run. However, the first international conflict the Headquarters Battery participated in was the Siege of Santiago during the Spanish–American War when they were a part of the United States First Army Corps. The silver badge of the First Army Corps during the Spanish–American War is depicted in the "sinister chief", top right of the shield.

The area around the city of El Paso, Texas was known as Ponce de Leon's ranch predating the foundation of the United States of America. The area was settled and colonized by a group of Ponce de Leon's followers and they named their new home after their leader. The "demi-lion rampant" on the bottom part of the shield was taken from the crest of Ponce de Leon to represent the first time the 119th Field Artillery Regiment was federalized and sent to the Mexican-American border near El Paso, Texas during the Mexican Expedition.

=== Description of crest ===
The crest is used only on the coat of arms. It is the part above the shield. From The Institute of Heraldry:

"That for the regiments and separate battalions of the Michigan Army National Guard: On a wreath of the colors Argent and Gules, a griffin segreant Or."

In plain English: The 119th Field Artillery Regiment is a regiment in the Michigan Army National Guard and therefore they use the crest of the Michigan Army National Guard above the shield on their coat of arms. The "wreath" also called a torse, is the horizontal braided band that runs across the top of the shield. The colors of the "wreath" are "Argent and Gules", white and red. Above the "wreath" is a "griffin segreant" which is a mythical bird called a griffin in the same position as a "lion rampant" but with its wings extended. The color of the "griffin segreant" is "Or", yellow.

=== Motto ===
The motto appears below the shield on the Distinctive Unit Insignia. The Institute of Heraldry states

"Attached below and to the sides of the shield a Gold scroll inscribed "VIAM PRAEPARAMUS" in raised base metal."

VIAM PRAEPARAMUS is Latin for the phrase WE PREPARE THE WAY.

== Bibliography ==
- About French Property (2019). "Lorraine". aboutfrenchproperty.com. Archived from the original on 20 May 2020.
- Addington, Larry (1995). The United States in the First World War: An Encyclopedia. New York, NY: Garland Publishing Inc. pp. 399–400. ISBN 0815333536.
- Bangor Public Library (1941). Pictorial review Seventy-second Field Artillery Brigade, Army of the United States, 1941. Vol. World War Regimental Histories: World War Collections. Bangor, ME: Bangor Public Library. This article incorporates text from this source, which is in the public domain.
- Bratic, Kimberly (2014). "Michigan Army Guard artillery, aviation units conduct cold weather sling load and howitzer live fire exercise". Augusta, MI: 126th Public Affairs Operations Center. This article incorporates text from this source, which is in the public domain.
- Buchanan, Candice Lynn (2017). The Rain Day Boys: The Greene That Lay Near Grimpettes Woods. Pennsylvania, Greene County, Waynesburg: CreateSpace Independent Publishing Platform. pp. 43–55. ISBN 978-1977868428.
- Order of Battle of the United States Land Forces in the World War: American Expeditionary Forces: Divisions (PDF) (Report). Vol. 2. Washington, D.C.: Center of Military History, United States Army. 1987. Archived from the original (PDF) on 24 September 2015. This article incorporates text from this source, which is in the public domain.
- Order of Battle of the United States Land Forces in the World War: Zone of the Interior: Directory of Troops (PDF) (Report). Vol. 3: Part 3. Washington, D.C.: Center of Military History, United States Army. 1988. Archived from the original (PDF) on 20 December 2016. This article incorporates text from this source, which is in the public domain.
- United States Army in the World War 1917–1919: Organization of the American Expeditionary Forces (PDF) (Report). Vol. 1. Washington, D.C.: Center of Military History, United States Army. 1988. Archived from the original (PDF) on 20 September 2015. This article incorporates text from this source, which is in the public domain.
- United States Army in the World War 1917–1919: Training and Use of American Units With the British and French (PDF) (Report). Vol. 3. Washington, D.C.: Center of Military History, United States Army. 1989. Archived from the original (PDF) on 20 December 2016. This article incorporates text from this source, which is in the public domain.
- United States Army in the World War 1917–1919: Military Operations of the American Expeditionary Forces (PDF) (Report). Vol. 5. Washington, D.C.: Center of Military History, United States Army. 1989. Archived from the original (PDF) on 26 February 2016. This article incorporates text from this source, which is in the public domain.
- United States Army in the World War 1917–1919: Military Operations of the American Expeditionary Forces (PDF) (Report). Vol. 6. Washington, D.C.: Center of Military History, United States Army. 1990. Archived from the original (PDF) on 20 December 2016. This article incorporates text from this source, which is in the public domain.
- United States Army in the World War 1917–1919: Military Operations of the American Expeditionary Forces (PDF) (Report). Vol. 9. Washington, D.C.: Center of Military History, United States Army. 1990. Archived from the original (PDF) on 20 December 2016. This article incorporates text from this source, which is in the public domain.
- Clay, Steven E. (2010a). US Army Order of Battle 1919–1941 (PDF). Vol. 1: The Arms: Major Commands and Infantry Organizations, 1919–1941. US Army Combined Arms Center, Fort Leavenworth, KS: Combat Studies Institute Press. ISBN 9781780399164. Archived from the original (PDF) on 1 January 2020. This article incorporates text from this source, which is in the public domain.
- Clay, Steven E. (2010b). US Army Order of Battle 1919–1941 (PDF). Vol. 2: The Arms: Cavalry, Field Artillery, and Coast Artillery, 1919–41. US Army Combined Arms Center, Fort Leavenworth, KS: Combat Studies Institute Press. ISBN 9781780399171. Archived from the original (PDF) on 1 January 2020. This article incorporates text from this source, which is in the public domain.
- Clay, Steven E. (2010c). US Army Order of Battle 1919–1941 (PDF). Vol. 4: The Services: Quartermaster, Medical, Military Police, Signal Corps, Chemical Warfare, and Miscellaneous Organizations, 1919–1941. US Army Combined Arms Center, Fort Leavenworth, KS: Combat Studies Institute Press. pp. Appedndix F. ISBN 9781780399195. Archived from the original (PDF) on 1 January 2020. This article incorporates text from this source, which is in the public domain.
- Clelland, Charlie (2019). "6-inch Howitzer M1908". Landships II. "The M1908 howitzer did not accompany US troops to France in 1917 since the French offered to supply the longer ranged and more modern Mle 1917 Schneider howitzer."
- Deinlein, Joseph (4 December 2003). "Port Huron Guard off to Guantanamo: Families, friends say goodbye to departing troops". Times Herald. Port Huron, MI: Timothy Gruber.
- Department of the Army (27 March 2008). Permanent Orders 087-16 (PDF) (Report). Alexandria, VA: Department of the Army. Archived from the original (PDF) on 8 June 2010. This article incorporates text from this source, which is in the public domain.
- Department of the Army (2017). Army Regulation 840-10 (PDF) (Report). Vol. Heraldic Activities: Flags, Guidons, Streamers, Tabards, and Automobile and Aircraft Plates. Washington, D.C.: Department of the Army. This article incorporates text from this source, which is in the public domain.
- DMVA (Biennial Report) (2014). Biennial Report: FY 2013-2014 (PDF) (Report). Lansing, Michigan: Michigan Department of Military & Veteran Affairs. This article incorporates text from this source, which is in the public domain.
- DMVA (Mexican Border Duty) (2019). "History of the Michigan National Guard: Mexican Border Duty". Lansing, MI: Michigan Department of Military and Veterans Affairs. This article incorporates text from this source, which is in the public domain.
- DMVA (World War One) (2019). "History of the Michigan National Guard: World War I". Lansing, MI: Michigan Department of Military and Veterans Affairs. This article incorporates text from this source, which is in the public domain.
- DMVA (Flint) (2019). "History of the Michigan National Guard: Labor Troubles in Flint". Lansing, MI: Michigan Department of Military and Veterans Affairs. This article incorporates text from this source, which is in the public domain.
- DMVA (Detroit) (2019). "History of the Michigan National Guard: The Tumultuous 1960s-Detroit, 1967". Lansing, MI: Michigan Department of Military and Veterans Affairs. This article incorporates text from this source, which is in the public domain.
- DMVA (One Hundred and Nineteenth Field Artillery) (2019). "History of the Michigan National Guard: 119th Field Artillery in World War I". Lansing, MI: Michigan Department of Military and Veterans Affairs. This article incorporates text from this source, which is in the public domain.
- Hindenburg Line: German Defense System. Edinburgh, Scotland: Encyclopædia Britannica, Inc. 2019.
- Fox-Davies, Arthur C. (1909). A Complete Guide to Heraldy. London, England: T.C. & E.C. Jack. This article incorporates text from this source, which is in the public domain.
- German High Command and Allied Forces (1945). "Act of Military Surrender". Series: Instruments of German Surrender, 1941 - 1977. Berlin, Germany: German High Command and Allied Forces. This article incorporates text from this source, which is in the public domain.
- Globalsecurity (2019). "1st Battalion – 119th Field Artillery Regiment "Red Lions"". Alexandra, VA: John E. Pike (Director of globalsecurity.org).
- Heaton, TSgt. Dan (2019). "This Day in History: Michigan National Guard". Harrison Township, Michigan: 127th Wing: Michigan Air National Guard. Archived from the original on 20 May 2020. This article incorporates text from this source, which is in the public domain.
- History (American) (2010). "The United States officially enters World War I". This Day in History:6 April 1917. New York, NY: A&E Television Networks.
- Hugh, Leach (27 May 2004). "Michigan units step up to security tasks in Guantanamo Bay". Lansing State Journal. Lansing, MI: Timothy Gruber.
- Huston, James A. (1966). The Sinews of War: Army Logistics; 1775–1953. Washington, D.C.: Office of the Chief of Military History, United States Army. ISBN 9780160899140. This article incorporates text from this source, which is in the public domain.
- Jessiekratz (21 July 2017). "The Lost Battalion of World War I". Pieces of History: World War I. Washington, D.C.: National Archives and Records Administration. This article incorporates text from this source, which is in the public domain.
- Katz, Friedrich (February 1978). "Pancho Villa and the Attack on Columbus, New Mexico" (PDF). The American Historical Review. 83 (1). Chicago, IL: University of Chicago Press: 101–130. doi:10.2307/1865904. JSTOR 1865904.
- McKenney, Janice E. (2007). Army Lineage Series: The Organizational History of Field Artillery 1775-2003 (PDF). Washington, D.C.: Center of Military History, United States Army. ISBN 9780160771156. Archived from the original (PDF) on 23 May 2012. This article incorporates text from this source, which is in the public domain.
- McKenney, Janice E. (2010). Army Lineage Series: Field Artillery (Part 2) (PDF). Washington, D.C.: Center of Military History, United States Army. ISBN 9789997392251. Archived from the original (PDF) on 28 June 2020. This article incorporates text from this source, which is in the public domain.
- McSherry, Patrick (2019). "Spanish American War Corps Badges". www.spanamwar.com/.
- Michigan National Guard (2019). "Camp Grayling". Lansing, MI: Michigan National Guard. Archived from the original on 8 December 2019. This article incorporates text from this source, which is in the public domain.
- Michigan National Guard (2016). "Units work together to have a blast at Northern Strike 16". Lansing, MI: Joint Force Headquarters. This article incorporates text from this source, which is in the public domain.
- Michigan State National Guard (2020). "Units and Leadership". Lansing, MI: Michigan State National Guard. Archived from the original on 2 October 2019. This article incorporates text from this source, which is in the public domain.
- Miller, Bruce (1988). "A Grammar of Blazonry". Milpitas, CA: The Society for Creative Anachronism (SCA).
- Miller, Helen (2016). "Michigan field artillery's 'Blackjacks' training in Latvia". Lansing, MI: Michigan National Guard. This article incorporates text from this source, which is in the public domain.
- Office of the Theater Historian (1945). "Order of Battle of the U.S. Army, World War II, European Theater of Operations, Divisions". Paris, France: Office of the Theater Historian. Archived from the original on 9 January 2008. This article incorporates text from this source, which is in the public domain.
- Parker, James (1894). A Glossary of Terms Used in Heraldry. Oxford, England: J. H. Parker. This article incorporates text from this source, which is in the public domain.
- Presidential Library and Museum (Gerald Ford) (2006). "Gerald R. Ford Biography". Ann Arbor, MI: Presidential Library & Museum: Gerald R. Ford. This article incorporates text from this source, which is in the public domain.
- Shea, Bill (25 March 2003). "Port Huron's citizen soldiers don't expect to join the fight". Times Herald. Port Huron, MI: Timothy Gruber.
- Shea, Bill (3 May 2004). "National Guard unit reorganizes: Port Huron Armory to remain open; few immediate changes expected". Times Herald. Port Huron, MI: Timothy Gruber.
- Stahl, Kenny (2019). "Economy Printing-The Raid". Homestead: detroits-great-rebellion.com.
- Stanton, Shelby L. (1984). Order of Battle: U.S. Army World War II. Novato, California: Presidio Press. ISBN 9780891411956. "815th tank destroyer."
- Stanton, Shelby L. (2006). World War II Order of Battle: An Encyclopedic Reference to US Ground Forces from Battalion through Division 1939-1946 Revised Edition. Mechanicsburg PA: Stackpole Books. ISBN 9780811701570.
- Teller (17 December 2010). "Subject Focus: Remembering the Flint Sit-Down". Detroit, MI: Wayne State University, Walter P. Reuther Library.
- The Institute of Heraldry (2018). "U.S. Army Heraldry: Unit Award Streamers". Fort Belvoir, VA: The Institute of Heraldry. This article incorporates text from this source, which is in the public domain.
- The Institute of Heraldry (2019). "U.S. Army Heraldry: Distinctive Unit Insignia, Shoulder Sleeve Insignia, Coat of Arms: 119th Field Artillery Regiment". Fort Belvoir, VA: The Institute of Heraldry. This article incorporates text from this source, which is in the public domain.
- The Institute of Heraldry (2020). "Foreign Military Decorations, Campaign, and Service Medals: Croix De Guerre, France". Fort Belvoir, VA: The Institute of Heraldry. This article incorporates text from this source, which is in the public domain.
- United States Army (1950). "The Army Almanac: A Book of Facts Concerning the Army of the United States". Washington, D.C.: U.S. Government Printing Office. Archived from the original on 8 June 2010. This article incorporates text from this source, which is in the public domain.
- United States Army (2017). "Historical Activities: The U.S. Army Regimental System" (PDF). Washington, D.C.: Headquarters, Department of the Army. This article incorporates text from this source, which is in the public domain.
- United States Congress (Selective Service Act) (1917). Selective Service Act of 1917 (PDF). Washington, D.C.: United States Congress. Pub. L. 65–12, 40 Stat. 76, enacted May 18, 1917 This article incorporates text from this source, which is in the public domain.
- United States Congress (War - Germany) (1941). Declaration of War on Germany. Washington, D.C.: United States Congress. Pub. L. 77–331, 56 Stat. 796, enacted December 11, 1941 This article incorporates text from this source, which is in the public domain.
- United States, Executive Office of the President (Lyndon B. Johnson) (24 July 1967). "Executive Order 11364: Providing for the Restoration of Law and Order in the State of Michigan". Washington, D.C.: 32 Federal Register 10907; 26 July 1967. Archived from the original on 5 December 2010. This article incorporates text from this source, which is in the public domain.
- U.S. Department of State (2009). Punitive Expedition in Mexico, 1916–1917 (Report). Washington, D.C.: U.S. Department of State. This article incorporates text from this source, which is in the public domain.
- Vance, Cyrus R. (1967). "Final Report of Cyrus R. Vance, Special Assistant to the Secretary of Defense, Concerning the Detroit Riots July 23 through August 2, 1967". Austin, TX: Lyndon Baines Johnson Library and Museum. Archived from the original on 7 June 2011. This article incorporates text from this source, which is in the public domain.
- Wilson, John B. (1998). Army Lineage Series: Maneuver and Firepower - The Evolution of Divisions and Separate Brigades (PDF). Washington, D.C.: Center of Military History, United States Army. ISBN 9781507678268. Archived from the original (PDF) on 1 March 2014. This article incorporates text from this source, which is in the public domain.
- Wilson, John B. (1999). Army Lineage Series: Armies, Corps, Divisions, and Separate Brigades (PDF). Washington, D.C.: Center of Military History, United States Army. ISBN 9780160499920. Archived from the original (PDF) on 8 August 2014. This article incorporates text from this source, which is in the public domain.
- Woodward, John (1892). A Treatise on Heraldry: British and Foreign with English and French Glossaries. Edinburgh, Scotland and London, England: W. & A. K. Johnston. This article incorporates text from this source, which is in the public domain.
- Yockelson, Mitchell (Fall 1997a). "The United States Armed Forces and the Mexican Punitive Expedition: Part 1". Prologue. Vol. 29, no. 3. Washington, D.C.: National Archives and Records Administration. This article incorporates text from this source, which is in the public domain.
- Yockelson, Mitchell (Winter 1997b). "The United States Armed Forces and the Mexican Punitive Expedition: Part 2". Prologue. Vol. 29, no. 4. Washington, D.C.: National Archives and Records Administration. This article incorporates text from this source, which is in the public domain.
