= Château d'Aspach-le-Haut =

Now destroyed castle in Aspach-le-Haut, France

Coordinates: 47.7819°N 7.1160°E

The Château d'Aspach-le-Haut was a castle, now destroyed, in the commune of Aspach-le-Haut in the Haut-Rhin département of France.

The castle is believed to have been built in the 14th century. In 1468, it was captured by Swiss forces. Its date of destruction and precise location are not known.

== See also ==
- List of castles in France
