= Terny-Sorny =

- Commune
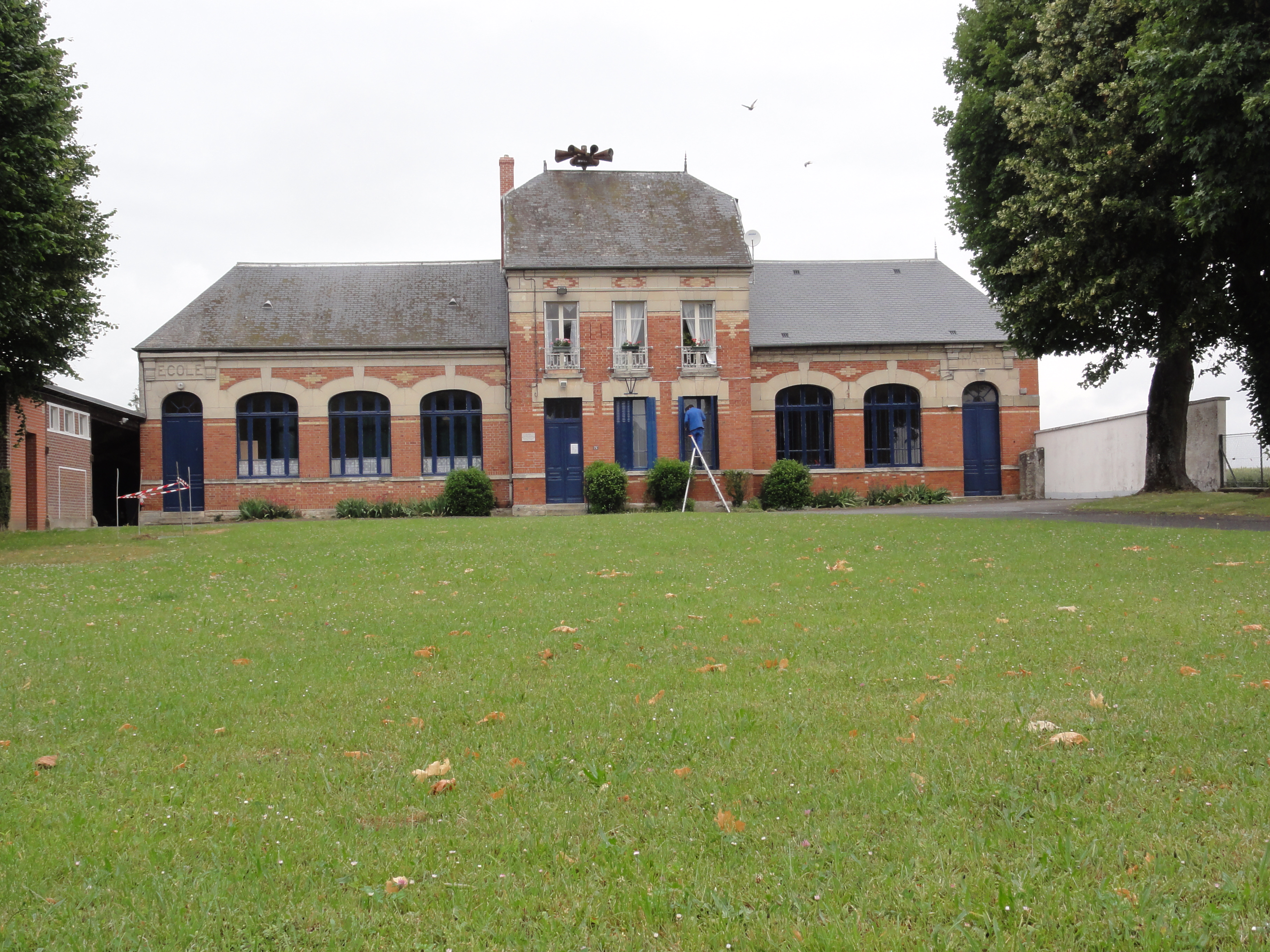
- The town hall and school of Terny-Sorny
- Location of Terny-Sorny
- Location within France Location within Hauts-de-France
- Coordinates: 49°26′52″N 3°22′09″E
- Country: France
- Region: Hauts-de-France
- Department: Aisne
- Arrondissement: Soissons
- Canton: Fère-en-Tardenois
- Intercommunality: Val de l'Aisne

Government
  - Mayor (2026–32): Bruno Sauvage
- Area^{1}: 7.07 km^{2} (2.73 sq mi)
- Elevation: 160 m (520 ft)
- Highest elevation: 163 m (535 ft)
- Lowest elevation: 72 m (236 ft)
- Population (2023): 317
  - Density: 44.8/km^{2} (116/sq mi)
- Time zone: UTC+01:00 (CET)
  - Summer (DST): UTC+02:00 (CEST)
- INSEE/Postal code: 02739 /02880
- ^{1} French Land Register data, which excludes lakes, ponds, glaciers > 1 km^{2} (0.386 sq mi or 247 acres) and river estuaries.

Terny-Sorny (French pronunciation: [tɛʁni sɔʁni]) is a commune in the Aisne department in Hauts-de-France in northern France.

== Population ==
Historical population
Year	Pop.	±% p.a.
1968	253	—
1975	244	−0.52%
1982	230	−0.84%
1990	315	+4.01%
1999	328	+0.45%
2007	310	−0.70%
2012	314	+0.26%
2017	330	+1.00%
2023	317	−0.67%
Source: INSEE

== See also ==
- Communes of the Aisne department
