= Aspach-le-Haut =

Part of Aspach-Michelbach in Grand Est, France

- Part of Aspach-Michelbach
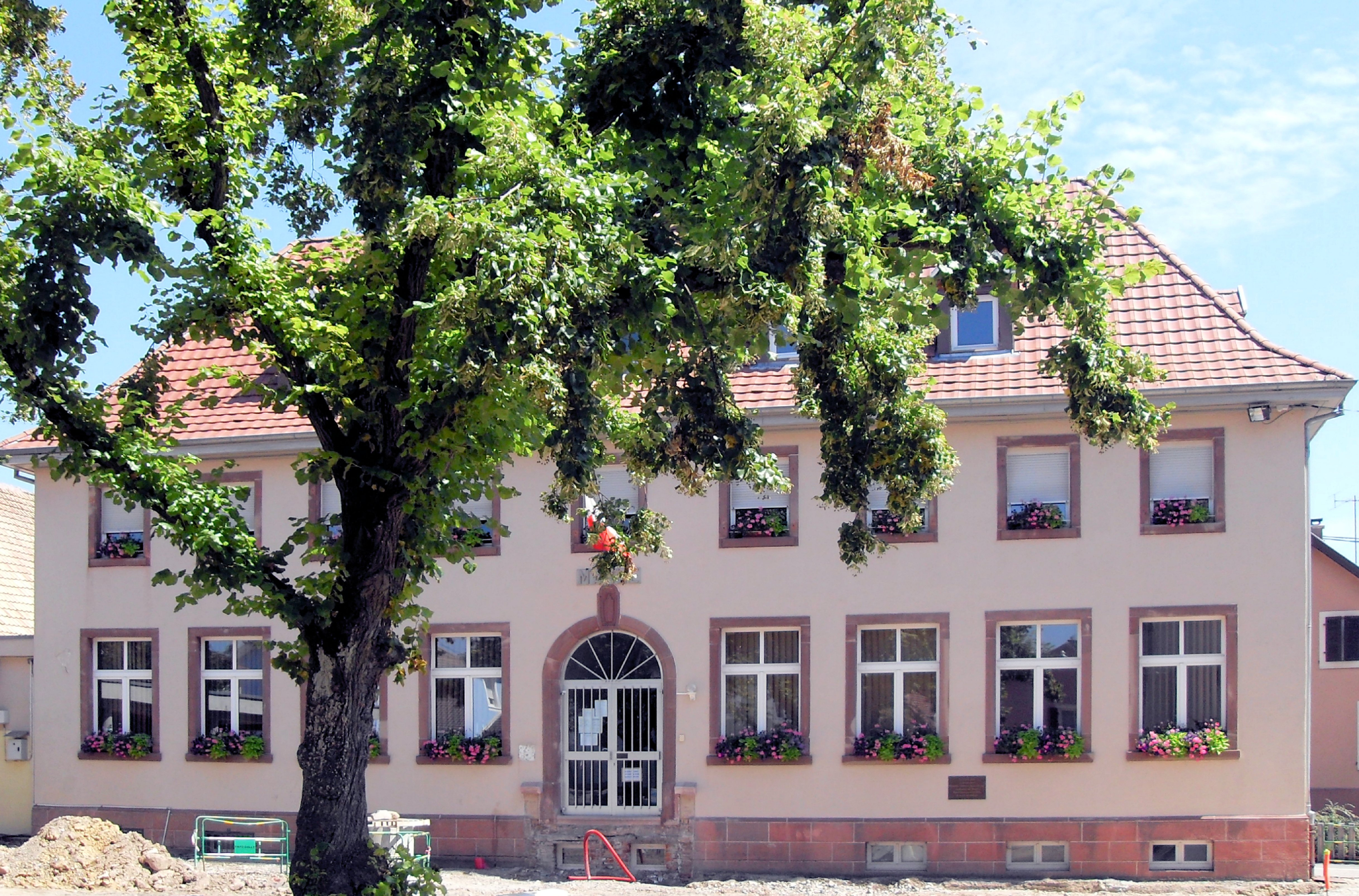
- Town hall

- Coat of arms
- Location of Aspach-le-Haut
- Location within France Location within Grand Est
- Coordinates: 47°46′34″N 7°07′59″E
- Country: France
- Region: Grand Est
- Department: Haut-Rhin
- Arrondissement: Thann-Guebwiller
- Canton: Cernay
- Commune: Aspach-Michelbach
- Area^{1}: 8.69 km^{2} (3.36 sq mi)
- Elevation: 313 m (1,027 ft)
- Highest elevation: 402 m (1,319 ft)
- Lowest elevation: 301 m (988 ft)
- Population (2022): 1,461
  - Density: 168/km^{2} (435/sq mi)
- Time zone: UTC+01:00 (CET)
  - Summer (DST): UTC+02:00 (CEST)
- Postal code: 68700
- ^{1} French Land Register data, which excludes lakes, ponds, glaciers > 1 km^{2} (0.386 sq mi or 247 acres) and river estuaries.

Aspach-le-Haut (German: Oberaspach, Alsatian: Ìweràschbàch) is a former commune in the Haut-Rhin department in north-eastern France. On 1 January 2016, it was merged into the new commune Aspach-Michelbach.

== Sights and monuments ==
- Saint-Barthélémy church
- Farm from 1778
- Calvary from 1858
- Railway heritage and tourism
- Château d'Aspach-le-Haut - 14th-century castle now destroyed.

== See also ==
- Communes of the Haut-Rhin department
