= Michelbach, Lower Austria =

Michelbach
- Municipality
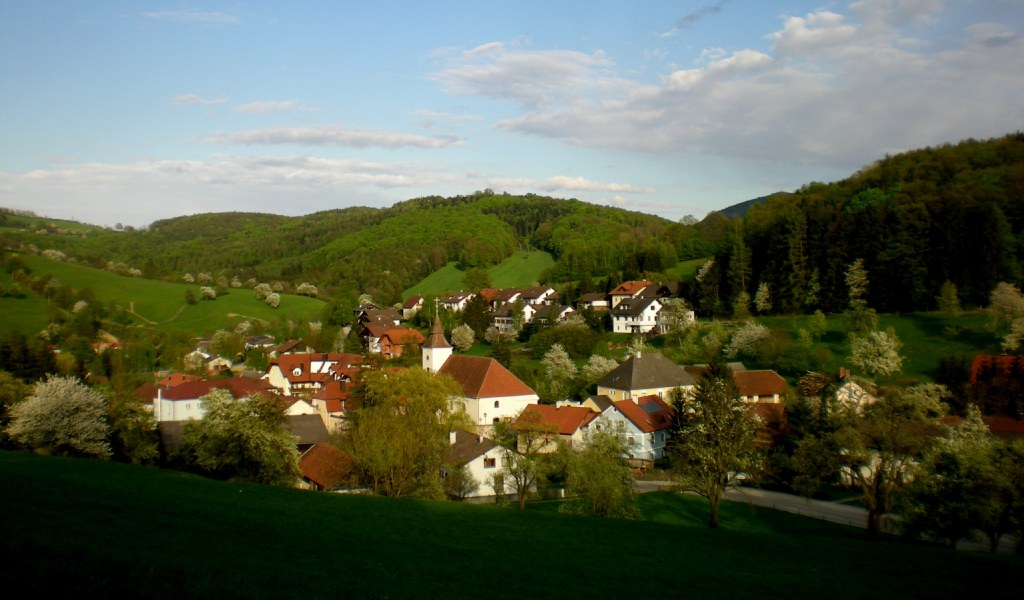
- View of Michelbach

- Coat of arms

- Location within Austria
- Coordinates: 48°5′N 15°45′E
- Country: Austria
- State: Lower Austria
- District: Sankt Pölten-Land

Government
  - Mayor: Hermann Rothbauer

Area
  - Total: 24.95 km^{2} (9.63 sq mi)
- Elevation: 376 m (1,234 ft)

Population (2018-01-01)
  - Total: 915
  - Density: 36.7/km^{2} (95.0/sq mi)
- Time zone: UTC+1 (CET)
  - Summer (DST): UTC+2 (CEST)
- Postal code: 3074
- Area code: 02744
- Website: www.michelbach.at

Michelbach (German: [ˈmɪçl̩ˌbax]) is a town in the district of Sankt Pölten-Land in the Austrian state of Lower Austria.

== Population ==
Historical population
Year	Pop.	±%
1971	754	—
1981	793	+5.2%
1991	835	+5.3%
2001	921	+10.3%
