= Michelbach, Haut-Rhin =

Part of Aspach-Michelbach in Grand Est, France

Michelbach
- Part of Aspach-Michelbach
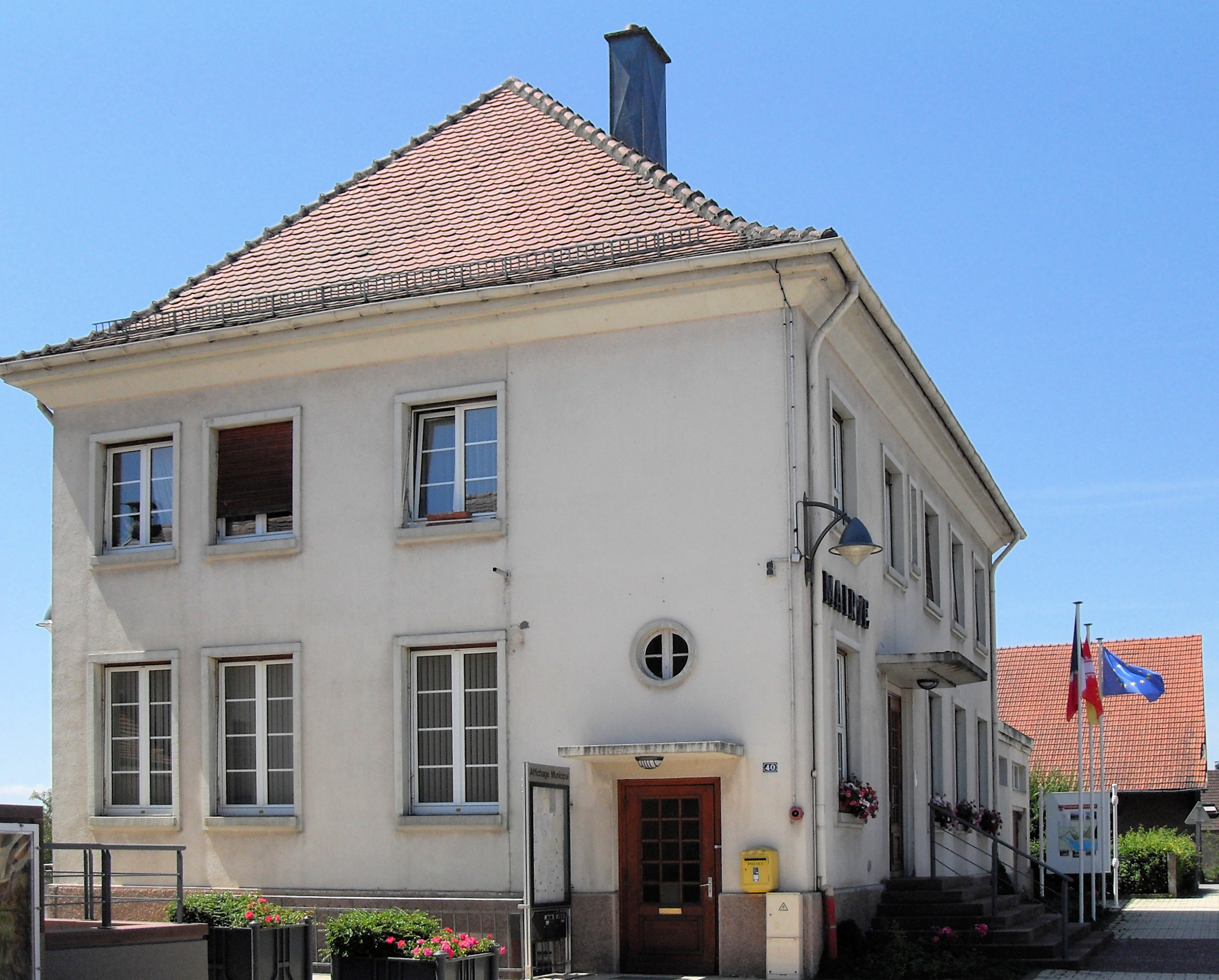
- Town hall

- Coat of arms
- Location of Michelbach
- Location within France Location within Grand Est
- Coordinates: 47°45′47″N 7°07′05″E
- Country: France
- Region: Grand Est
- Department: Haut-Rhin
- Arrondissement: Thann-Guebwiller
- Canton: Cernay
- Commune: Aspach-Michelbach
- Area^{1}: 3.35 km^{2} (1.29 sq mi)
- Elevation: 340 m (1,120 ft)
- Highest elevation: 403 m (1,322 ft)
- Lowest elevation: 316 m (1,037 ft)
- Population (2022): 293
  - Density: 87.5/km^{2} (227/sq mi)
- Time zone: UTC+01:00 (CET)
  - Summer (DST): UTC+02:00 (CEST)
- Postal code: 68700
- ^{1} French Land Register data, which excludes lakes, ponds, glaciers > 1 km^{2} (0.386 sq mi or 247 acres) and river estuaries.

Michelbach (Alsatian: Mìchelbàch) is a former commune in the Haut-Rhin department in north-eastern France. On 1 January 2016, it was merged into the new commune Aspach-Michelbach.

== See also ==
- Communes of the Haut-Rhin département
