= Aspach-Michelbach =

Commune in Grand Est, France

- Commune
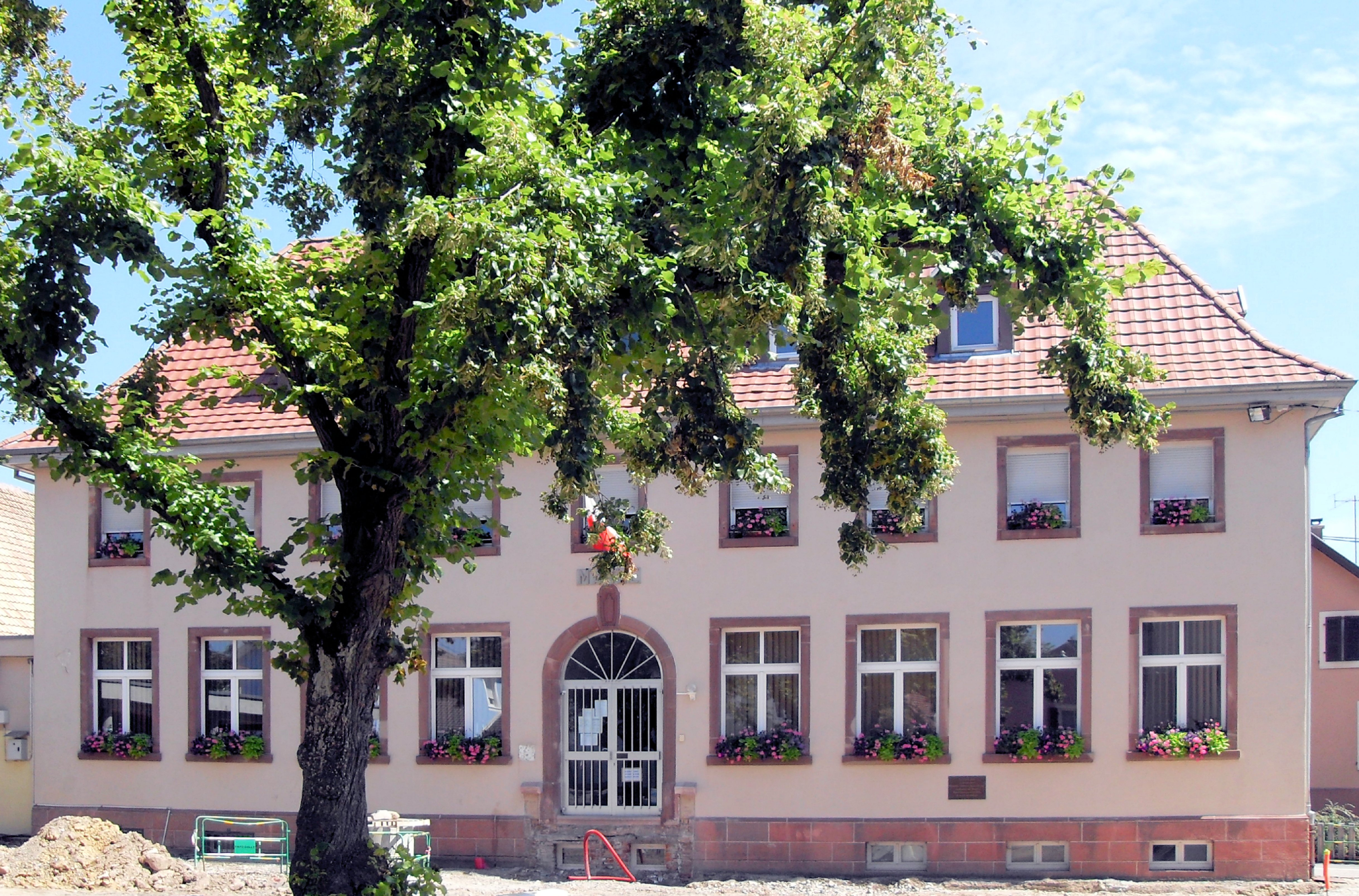
- The town hall in Aspach-Michelbach
- Location of Aspach-Michelbach
- Location within France Location within Grand Est
- Coordinates: 47°46′30″N 7°07′48″E
- Country: France
- Region: Grand Est
- Department: Haut-Rhin
- Arrondissement: Thann-Guebwiller
- Canton: Cernay
- Intercommunality: CC Thann-Cernay

Government
  - Mayor (2020–2026): François Horny
- Area^{1}: 12.03 km^{2} (4.64 sq mi)
- Population (2023): 1,747
  - Density: 145.2/km^{2} (376.1/sq mi)
- Time zone: UTC+01:00 (CET)
  - Summer (DST): UTC+02:00 (CEST)
- INSEE/Postal code: 68012 /68700
- ^{1} French Land Register data, which excludes lakes, ponds, glaciers > 1 km^{2} (0.386 sq mi or 247 acres) and river estuaries.

Aspach-Michelbach is a commune in the Haut-Rhin department of northeastern France. The municipality was established on 1 January 2016 and consists of the former communes of Aspach-le-Haut and Michelbach.

== See also ==
- Communes of the Haut-Rhin department
