= Tailly, Ardennes =

Tailly
- Commune
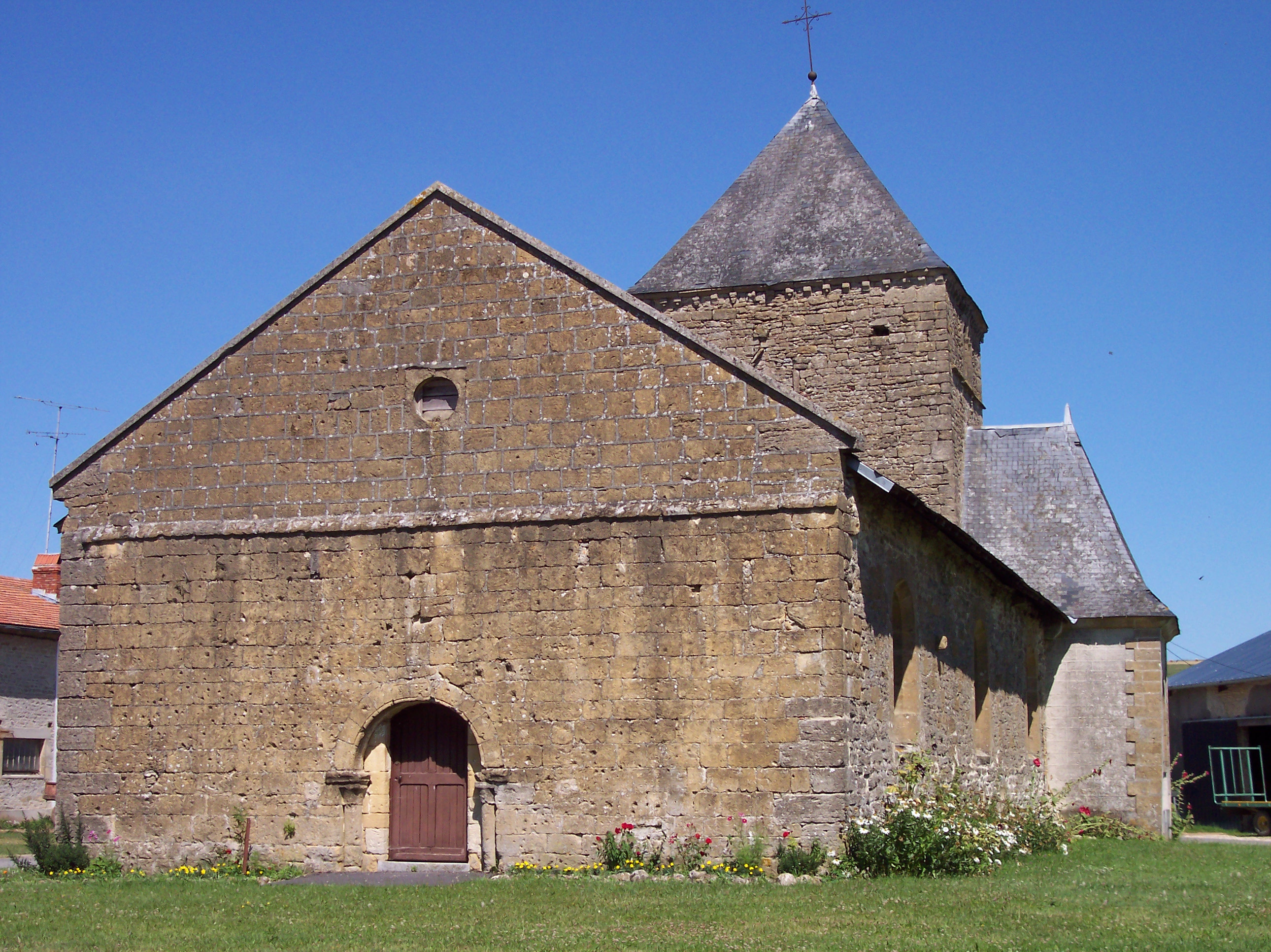
- The church of Barricourt in Tailly
- Location of Tailly
- Location within France Location within Grand Est
- Coordinates: 49°26′10″N 5°05′00″E
- Country: France
- Region: Grand Est
- Department: Ardennes
- Arrondissement: Vouziers
- Canton: Vouziers
- Intercommunality: Argonne Ardennaise

Government
  - Mayor (2020–2026): Vincent Thierion
- Area^{1}: 39.31 km^{2} (15.18 sq mi)
- Elevation: 312 m (1,024 ft)
- Highest elevation: 337 m (1,106 ft)
- Lowest elevation: 185 m (607 ft)
- Population (2023): 182
  - Density: 4.63/km^{2} (12.0/sq mi)
- Time zone: UTC+01:00 (CET)
  - Summer (DST): UTC+02:00 (CEST)
- INSEE/Postal code: 08437 /08240
- ^{1} French Land Register data, which excludes lakes, ponds, glaciers > 1 km^{2} (0.386 sq mi or 247 acres) and river estuaries.

Tailly is a commune in the Ardennes department in northern France. The commune was formed on 1 January 1973, as the union of 4 former communes: Andevanne, Barricourt, Rémonville and Tailly.

== Population ==
Historical population
Year	Pop.	±% p.a.
1968	353	—
1975	280	−3.26%
1982	235	−2.47%
1990	193	−2.43%
1999	206	+0.73%
2007	183	−1.47%
2012	172	−1.23%
2017	174	+0.23%
2023	182	+0.75%
Source: INSEE

== See also ==
- Communes of the Ardennes department
