= Michelbach, Saarland =

Community in the Saarland, Germany

Coordinates: 49.467°N 6.833°E

Michelbach (Saar) (German: [ˈmɪçl̩ˌbax]) is a small community in the Saarland, Germany. It is part of the municipality of Schmelz (Saar), and is situated in the district of Saarlouis. It's near the gate of the Hochwald region of the Saarland. As of 2011, there were 840 residents within the community.

The community has an average elevation of 288 meters above the sea level.

== Climate ==
Michelbach has a Temperate Oceanic Climate (Cfb). It sees the most rainfall in December, with 118 mm of average precipitation; and the least rainfall in April, with 67 mm of average precipitation.

Climate data for Michelbach
Month	Jan	Feb	Mar	Apr	May	Jun	Jul	Aug	Sep	Oct	Nov	Dec	Year
Mean daily maximum °C (°F)	3.7 (38.7)	5.1 (41.2)	9.3 (48.7)	13.7 (56.7)	17.4 (63.3)	21.0 (69.8)	22.8 (73.0)	22.4 (72.3)	18.6 (65.5)	13.8 (56.8)	8.2 (46.8)	4.6 (40.3)	13.4 (56.1)
Daily mean °C (°F)	1.4 (34.5)	1.9 (35.4)	5.2 (41.4)	9.3 (48.7)	13.3 (55.9)	16.7 (62.1)	18.5 (65.3)	18.1 (64.6)	14.4 (57.9)	10.4 (50.7)	5.6 (42.1)	2.4 (36.3)	9.8 (49.6)
Mean daily minimum °C (°F)	−1.0 (30.2)	−1.0 (30.2)	1.2 (34.2)	4.5 (40.1)	8.6 (47.5)	11.9 (53.4)	13.8 (56.8)	13.6 (56.5)	10.4 (50.7)	7.2 (45.0)	3.2 (37.8)	0.2 (32.4)	6.1 (42.9)
Average rainfall mm (inches)	100 (3.9)	80 (3.1)	80 (3.1)	67 (2.6)	82 (3.2)	79 (3.1)	81 (3.2)	79 (3.1)	77 (3.0)	85 (3.3)	93 (3.7)	118 (4.6)	1,021 (39.9)
Source: Climate-Data.org
