= Arrondissement of Guebwiller =

Coordinates: 47.92°N 7.20°E

Guebwiller
- Former arrondissement
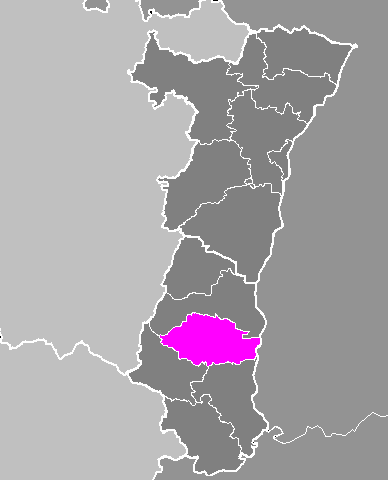
- Location within the former region Alsace
- Country: France
- Region: Grand Est
- Department: Haut-Rhin
- No. of communes: {{{nbcomm}}}
- Disbanded: 2015
- Area: 584 km^{2} (225 sq mi)
- Population (2012): 84,231
  - Density: 144/km^{2} (374/sq mi)

The arrondissement of Guebwiller is a former arrondissement of France in the Haut-Rhin department in the Alsace region. In 2015 it was disbanded, and most of its communes were assigned to the new arrondissement of Thann-Guebwiller, some to the arrondissement of Mulhouse. It had 47 communes, and its population was 84,231 (2012).

== Composition ==
The communes of the arrondissement of Guebwiller, and their INSEE codes, were:

1. Bergholtz (68029)	2. Bergholtzzell (68030)	3. Berrwiller (68032)	4. Biltzheim (68037)
5. Blodelsheim (68041)	6. Bollwiller (68043)	7. Buhl (68058)	8. Ensisheim (68082)
9. Feldkirch (68088)	10. Fessenheim (68091)	11. Gueberschwihr (68111)	12. Guebwiller (68112)
13. Gundolsheim (68116)	14. Hartmannswiller (68122)	15. Hattstatt (68123)	16. Hirtzfelden (68140)
17. Issenheim (68156)	18. Jungholtz (68159)	19. Lautenbach (68177)	20. Lautenbachzell (68178)
21. Linthal (68188)	22. Merxheim (68203)	23. Meyenheim (68205)	24. Munchhouse (68225)
25. Munwiller (68228)	26. Murbach (68229)	27. Niederentzen (68234)	28. Niederhergheim (68235)
29. Oberentzen (68241)	30. Oberhergheim (68242)	31. Orschwihr (68250)	32. Osenbach (68251)
33. Pfaffenheim (68255)	34. Pulversheim (68258)	35. Raedersheim (68260)	36. Rimbach-près-Guebwiller (68274)
37. Rimbachzell (68276)	38. Roggenhouse (68281)	39. Rouffach (68287)	40. Rumersheim-le-Haut (68291)
41. Rustenhart (68290)	42. Réguisheim (68266)	43. Soultz-Haut-Rhin (68315)	44. Soultzmatt (68318)
45. Ungersheim (68343)	46. Westhalten (68364)	47. Wuenheim (68381)	

== History ==
The arrondissement of Guebwiller was created in 1919. It was disbanded in 2015. As a result of the reorganisation of the cantons of France which came into effect in 2015, the borders of the cantons are no longer related to the borders of the arrondissements. The cantons of the arrondissement of Guebwiller were, as of January 2015:

1. Ensisheim
2. Guebwiller
3. Rouffach
4. Soultz-Haut-Rhin
