= Canton of Soultz-Haut-Rhin =

Coordinates: 47.8833°N 7.2333°E

Soultz-Haut-Rhin
- Former canton
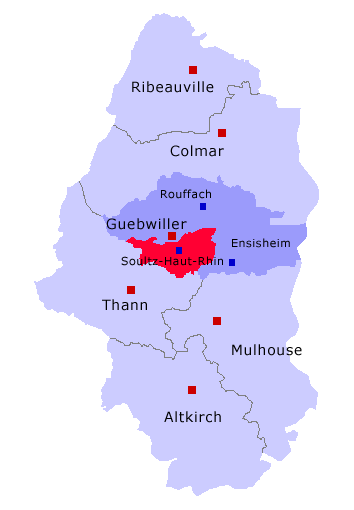
- Situation of the canton of Soultz-Haut-Rhin in the arrondissement of Guebwiller and in the département of Haut-Rhin
- Country: France
- Region: Nouvelle-Aquitaine
- Department: Dordogne
- No. of communes: {{{nbcomm}}}
- Disbanded: 2015
- Area: 101.5 km^{2} (39.2 sq mi)
- Population (2012): 23,348
  - Density: 230.0/km^{2} (595.8/sq mi)

The canton de Soultz-Haut-Rhin is a French former administrative division, located in the département of Haut-Rhin and the region Alsace. It had 23,348 inhabitants (2012). It was disbanded following the French canton reorganisation which came into effect in March 2015.

The canton comprised the following communes:

- Berrwiller
- Bollwiller
- Feldkirch
- Hartmannswiller
- Issenheim
- Jungholtz
- Merxheim
- Raedersheim
- Soultz-Haut-Rhin (seat)
- Ungersheim
- Wuenheim
