= Bergholtz =

Bergholtz may refer to:

- Bergholtz (surname)
- Bergholtz, Haut-Rhin, a commune in Haut-Rhin, Alsace, France
- Bergholtz (wine) and Bergholtz-Zell, two Alsace wines
- Bergholtz, New York

== See also ==
- Bergholz (disambiguation)
