= Le Markstein =

Ski resort in France

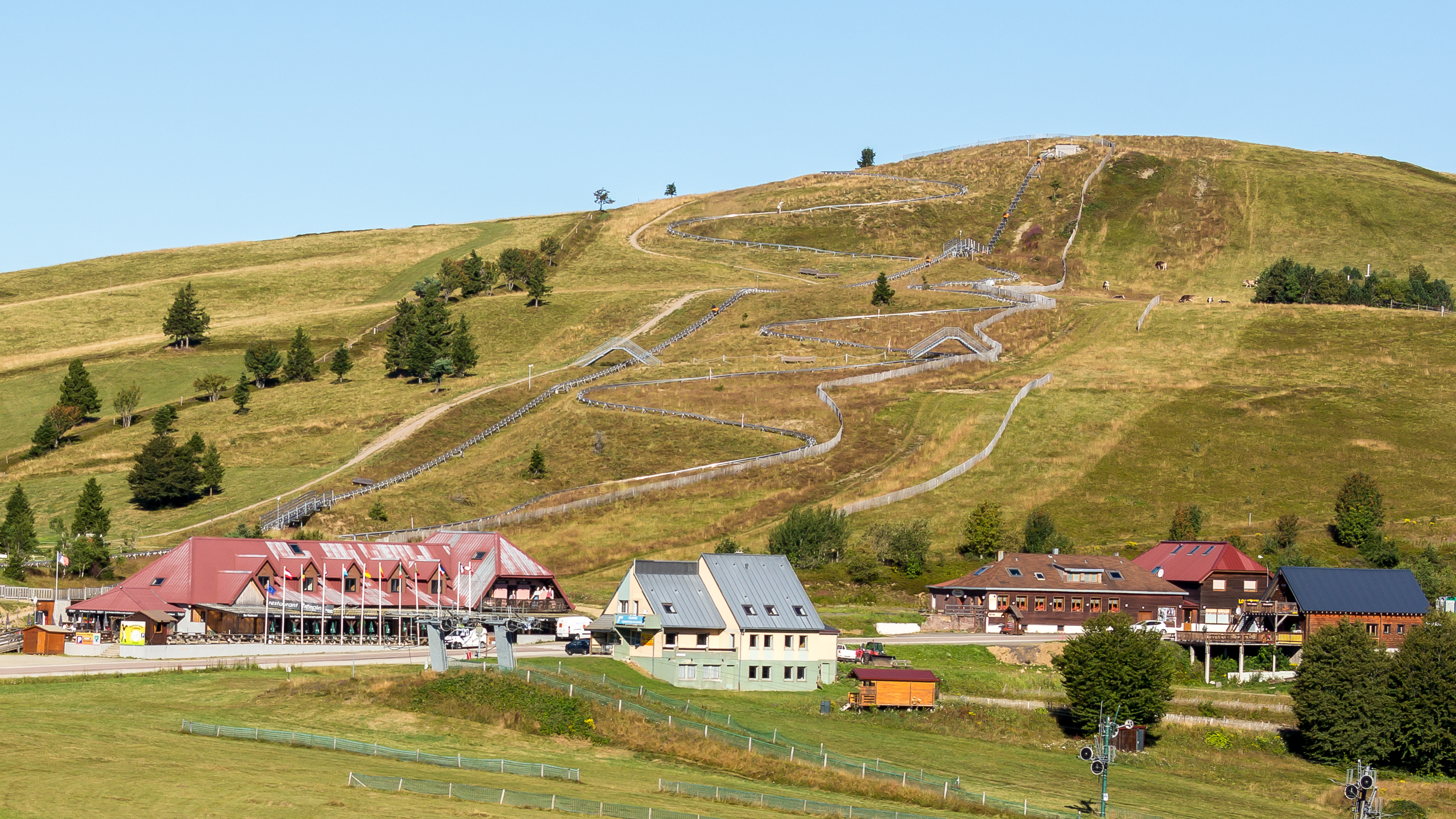
- Le Markstein

- Location within France Location within Grand Est
- Location: Lautenbach (Haut-Rhin), Oderen (Haut-Rhin)
- Nearest city: Guebwiller
- Coordinates: 47°55′35″N 7°1′48″E
- Top elevation: 1,268 m (4,160 ft)
- Base elevation: 1,020 m (3,346 ft)
- Trails: 12
- Website: www.lemarkstein.net/en/

Le Markstein (French pronunciation: [lə maʁkʃtain]) is a winter sports station in the Vosges mountains in France situated at an altitude of between 1,020 m (3,346 ft) and 1,268 m (4,160 ft) which is located on the Route des Crêtes. It forms a set of cross-country skiing with the Breitfirst ski-station and the Grand Ballon. The highest point is the summit of the Jungfraukopf. The station staged World Cup skiing in 1983 and 1987 and World Cup Paragliding in 1999. The roads through the station are also used from time to time by the Tour de France cycle race, including twice in 2014 and again in 2023 and 2026.

== Geography ==
=== Climate ===
Le Markstein has a humid continental climate (Köppen climate classification Dfb) closely bordering on a subarctic climate (Dfc). The average annual temperature in Le Markstein is 6.0 °C (42.8 °F). The average annual rainfall is 1,523.3 mm (59.97 in) with December as the wettest month. The temperatures are highest on average in August, at around 14.2 °C (57.6 °F), and lowest in January, at around −1.5 °C (29.3 °F). The highest temperature ever recorded in Le Markstein was 30.3 °C (86.5 °F) on 7 August 2015; the coldest temperature ever recorded was −20.4 °C (−4.7 °F) on 20 December 2009.

Climate data for Le Markstein (1981–2010 averages, extremes 1994−present)
Month	Jan	Feb	Mar	Apr	May	Jun	Jul	Aug	Sep	Oct	Nov	Dec	Year
Record high °C (°F)	13.7 (56.7)	17.1 (62.8)	18.7 (65.7)	21.8 (71.2)	25.4 (77.7)	30.2 (86.4)	30.2 (86.4)	30.3 (86.5)	25.2 (77.4)	22.6 (72.7)	17.7 (63.9)	14.0 (57.2)	30.3 (86.5)
Mean daily maximum °C (°F)	0.9 (33.6)	1.2 (34.2)	3.5 (38.3)	7.9 (46.2)	12.5 (54.5)	16.0 (60.8)	17.4 (63.3)	17.4 (63.3)	13.1 (55.6)	9.8 (49.6)	4.2 (39.6)	1.3 (34.3)	8.8 (47.8)
Daily mean °C (°F)	−1.5 (29.3)	−1.3 (29.7)	0.9 (33.6)	4.8 (40.6)	9.2 (48.6)	12.5 (54.5)	14.0 (57.2)	14.2 (57.6)	10.2 (50.4)	7.1 (44.8)	2.0 (35.6)	−0.9 (30.4)	6.0 (42.8)
Mean daily minimum °C (°F)	−3.8 (25.2)	−3.7 (25.3)	−1.8 (28.8)	1.7 (35.1)	6.0 (42.8)	9.1 (48.4)	10.7 (51.3)	11.0 (51.8)	7.3 (45.1)	4.5 (40.1)	−0.3 (31.5)	−3.2 (26.2)	3.2 (37.8)
Record low °C (°F)	−14.9 (5.2)	−18.9 (−2.0)	−16.5 (2.3)	−9.5 (14.9)	−3.5 (25.7)	−0.5 (31.1)	3.4 (38.1)	1.8 (35.2)	−1.1 (30.0)	−8.3 (17.1)	−14.0 (6.8)	−20.4 (−4.7)	−20.4 (−4.7)
Average precipitation mm (inches)	139.5 (5.49)	131.5 (5.18)	128.8 (5.07)	86.2 (3.39)	121.7 (4.79)	105.3 (4.15)	128.8 (5.07)	123.0 (4.84)	119.3 (4.70)	140.1 (5.52)	133.9 (5.27)	165.2 (6.50)	1,523.3 (59.97)
Average precipitation days (≥ 1.0 mm)	12.2	12.6	13.0	12.1	13.6	12.1	13.1	12.1	11.4	12.6	13.7	14.1	152.5
Source: Meteociel

Climate data for Le Markstein, 1184m (1991–2020 normals)
Month	Jan	Feb	Mar	Apr	May	Jun	Jul	Aug	Sep	Oct	Nov	Dec	Year
Mean daily maximum °C (°F)	1.0 (33.8)	1.1 (34.0)	4.2 (39.6)	8.5 (47.3)	12.5 (54.5)	16.3 (61.3)	17.9 (64.2)	18.0 (64.4)	13.8 (56.8)	10.0 (50.0)	5.0 (41.0)	2.0 (35.6)	9.2 (48.5)
Daily mean °C (°F)	−1.4 (29.5)	−1.3 (29.7)	1.4 (34.5)	5.3 (41.5)	9.2 (48.6)	12.8 (55.0)	14.5 (58.1)	14.6 (58.3)	10.8 (51.4)	7.3 (45.1)	2.6 (36.7)	−0.3 (31.5)	6.3 (43.3)
Mean daily minimum °C (°F)	−3.7 (25.3)	−3.7 (25.3)	−1.4 (29.5)	2.1 (35.8)	5.8 (42.4)	9.3 (48.7)	11.0 (51.8)	11.3 (52.3)	7.7 (45.9)	4.7 (40.5)	0.3 (32.5)	−2.5 (27.5)	3.4 (38.1)
Average precipitation mm (inches)	153.1 (6.03)	115.2 (4.54)	121.5 (4.78)	79.5 (3.13)	124.5 (4.90)	111.1 (4.37)	119.6 (4.71)	114.0 (4.49)	111.8 (4.40)	138.4 (5.45)	130.4 (5.13)	170.2 (6.70)	1,489.3 (58.63)
Source: Meteociel

== Skiing ==
The Markstein ski station has eight ski lifts.

=== Tracks ===
The station has 12 tracks in all including:

- 4 green runs
- 4 blue runs
- 2 red runs
- 2 black runs

== Cycle racing ==
Prior to 2014, the Tour de France cycle race passed through Le Markstein seven times either during the passage over the Col du Grand Ballon or in the descent from the Col du Platzerwasel, although it was not categorized for the Mountains classification. The first passage was in 1969 and the most recent in 2009.

=== Details of the climbs ===
Starting from Guebwiller, to the east, the climb is 23.5 km (14.6 mi) long. Over this distance, the climb is 895 m (2,936 ft) at an average gradient of 3.8%, with the steepest sections being at 8.1%. The 2014 Tour de France route joins this climb at Lautenbach, from where there is a 10.8 km (6.7 mi) long climb at an average gradient of 5.4%.

Starting from Oderen, to the west, the climb is 20.5 km (12.7 mi) long. Over this distance, the climb is 722 m (2,369 ft) at an average gradient of 3.5%, with the steepest sections being at 8.6%.

=== 2014 Tour de France ===
In 2014, the Tour de France passed through Le Markstein twice. On Stage 9, on 13 July, the race climbed to Le Markstein from the sprint at Linthal, to the east, and the climb to the summit, with an altitude of 1,183 m (3,881 ft), ranked as First Category. The race then travelled via the Route des Crêtes (D431) before crossing the Col du Grand Ballon and descending to the finish at Mulhouse. The leader over the summit was the German rider Tony Martin.

The following day, the tour again passed through the station, as it descended from the Col du Platzerwasel towards Oderen.

=== 2026 Tour de France ===
Stage 14 of the 2026 Tour passed through Le Markstein twice. The first passage took place about 10 km after the riders climbed Col du Grand Ballon. After passing through the resort, the route took riders over three more categorized climbs—the first-time Tour climb of Col du Page, Ballon d'Alsace, and another first-time Tour climb of Col du Haag—before returning to Le Markstein for the stage finish. Tadej Pogačar won the stage on his way to a record-tying fifth Tour title.
