= Joseph von Lamezan =

Joseph von Lamezan (4 August 1816 – 7 July 1873) was a German Jesuit preacher. Some of his sermons were published.

== Life ==
Von Lamezan was born in Linkenstein, Baden-Württemberg, into the Freiherr Lamezan-Salins family, and educated by the Jesuits in Fribourg. He entered the Jesuit order on 5 December 1833, at the young age of 17, in Brig, and was ordained into priesthood on 31 December 1846, in Lausanne. He had just been appointed professor of rhetoric in 1847 when the Jesuits were expelled from Switzerland.

He lived for a while as a refugee in the Savoy, then became a teacher in Basel. He was a professor of rhetoric again in Issenheim and worked as Schlußprobandus in Drongen. From March 1851 until the fall of 1855 von Lamezan was the second preacher in the Münster Cathedral in Westphalia, and for the next four years he led the Jesuits in Cologne and preached in the church of the Minorites there. From 1860 until 1872 he preached in Münster, Mainz, Aachen, and finally in Koblenz, where he fell ill and died in 1873, in a private residence (after the expulsion of the Jesuit order).

== Influences ==
Von Lamezan saw in Saint Boniface a "counterrevolutionary par excellence", who opposed the "three basic evils" of the 1848 revolution: atheism, enmity toward the church, and weakness and sensuality.

== Works ==
Von Lamezan was praised as one of the finest Jesuit preachers, though few of his sermons were printed. Among those are six sermons on Die Hauptmomente des Lebens (1870); eight sermons for Lent (Fastenpredigt), Wollet nicht lieben die Welt (1872, 2nd edition 1882); and eighteen on Die Vollkommenheiten Gottes (1882) (published with a biographical sketch by P. Drecker).

== See also ==
- Catholic Church in Germany
- Catholic Church in Switzerland
