= Château de Hartmannswiller =

Castle in Haut-Rhin, Alsace, France

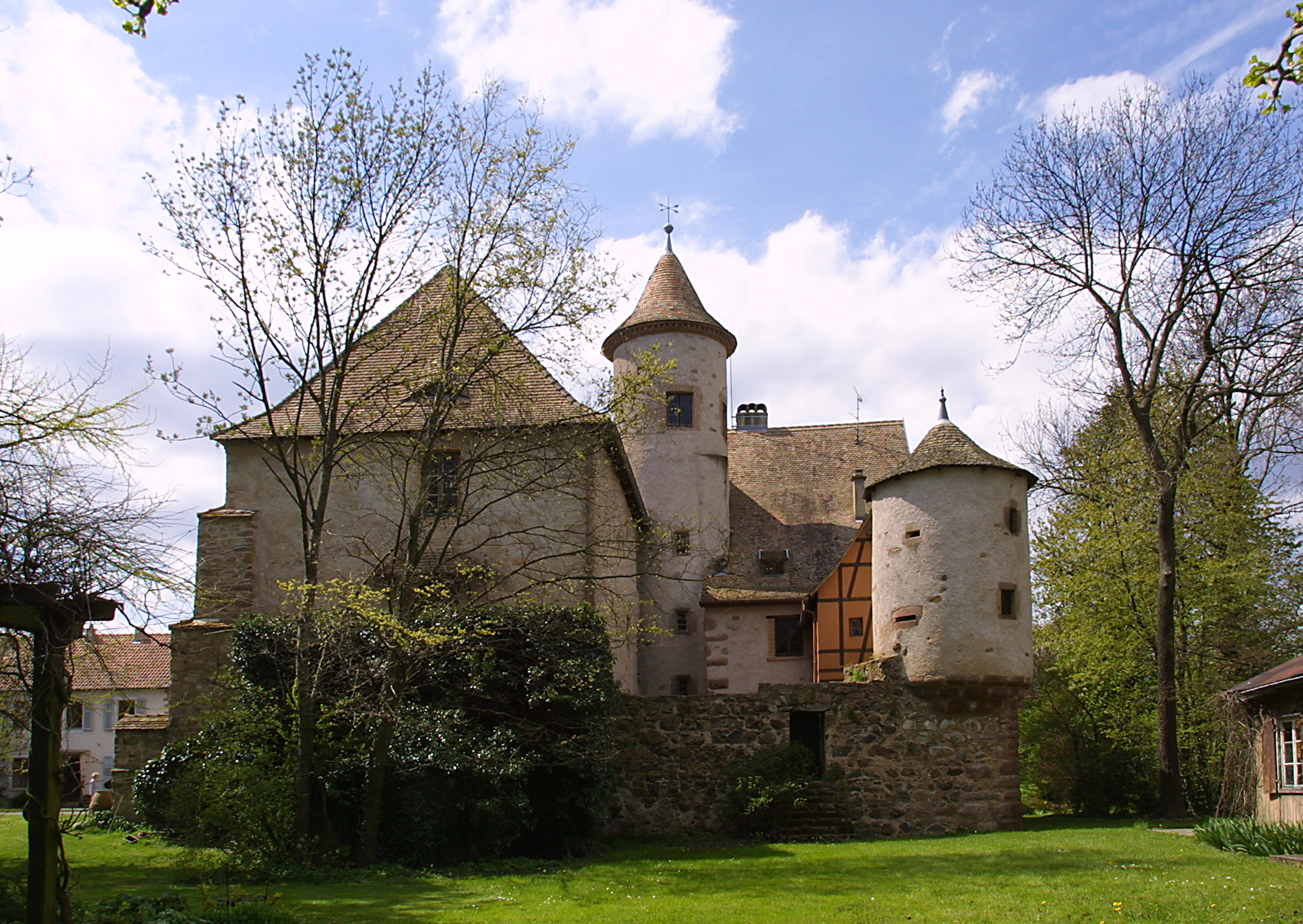
- Interactive map of Château de Hartmannswiller
- 47°51′45″N 7°13′08″E
- Location: Hartmannswiller, France

History
- Built: 1322
- Built for: Prince-Bishopric of Basel

Site notes
- Architectural style: French Renaissance (primarily)
- Restored: 18th/19th century

Château de Hartmannswiller is a castle in the commune of Hartmannswiller, in the department of Haut-Rhin, Alsace, France. Although a castle was already mentioned in the 14th century, the present structure mainly dates from the 16th and 18th century. It is a listed historical monument since 1988.

It was
