= Bergholz =

Bergholz may refer to:

== Places ==
- Bergholz, Mecklenburg-Vorpommern, a municipality in the Uecker-Randow district, in Mecklenburg-Vorpommern, Germany
- Bergholz, Ohio, a village in Jefferson County, United States
  - Bergholz Community, a former Amish community at Bergholz, Ohio
- Bergholz, New York, a hamlet in Wheatfield, New York, United States
- Bergholz-Rehbrücke, a former German municipality now part of Nuthetal

== People with the surname ==
- Friedrich Wilhelm von Bergholz, eighteenth century courtier
- Olga Bergholz (1910–1975), a Soviet poet

== Other uses ==
- 3093 Bergholz, a main-belt asteroid
- Stadion Bergholz, football stadium in Wil, Switzerland

== See also ==
- Bergholtz (disambiguation)
