= Linthal =

Linthal may refer to:

- Linthal, Glarus, a settlement in the upper valley of the Linth river, in the canton of Glarus in Switzerland
- Linthal, Haut-Rhin, a commune in the Haut-Rhin department in Alsace in north-eastern France
- The valley of the Linth river, in the canton of Glarus in Switzerland
