= Château d'Orschwihr =

Castle in Orschwihr, France

Coordinates: 47.9352°N 7.2345°E

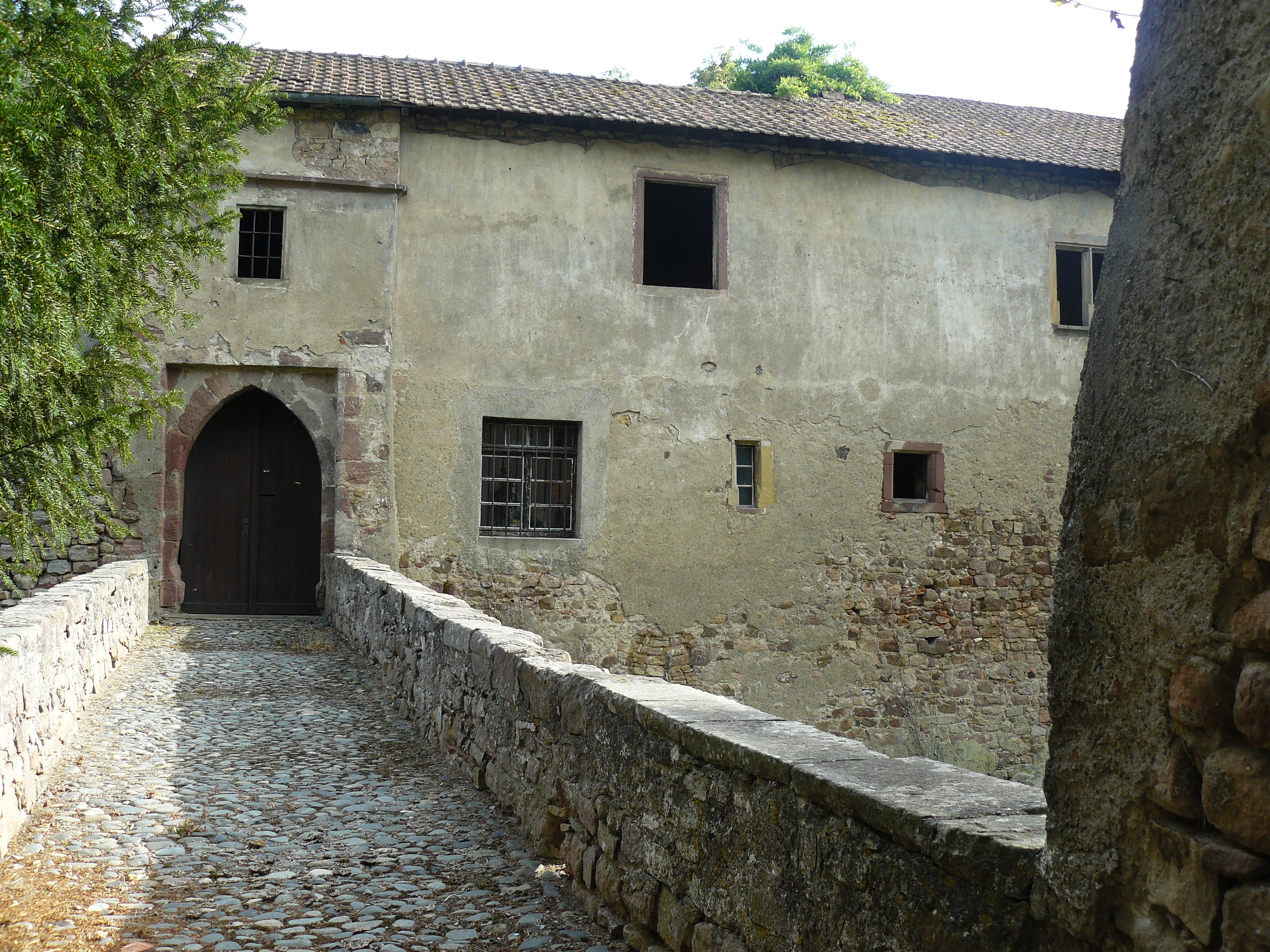
Entrance to the Castle

Château d'Orschwihr is a castle in the commune of Orschwihr, in the department of Haut-Rhin, Alsace, France. It is a listed historical monument since 1988.
