= Bergholtz (surname) =

Bergholtz is a surname. Notable people with the surname include:

- Gerard Bergholtz (born 1939), Dutch footballer and manager
- Marcus Bergholtz (born 1989), Swedish footballer
- Wilhelm Bergholtz (fl. 18th-century), German-Russian military officer
