= Rimbachzell =

Commune in Grand Est, France

- Commune
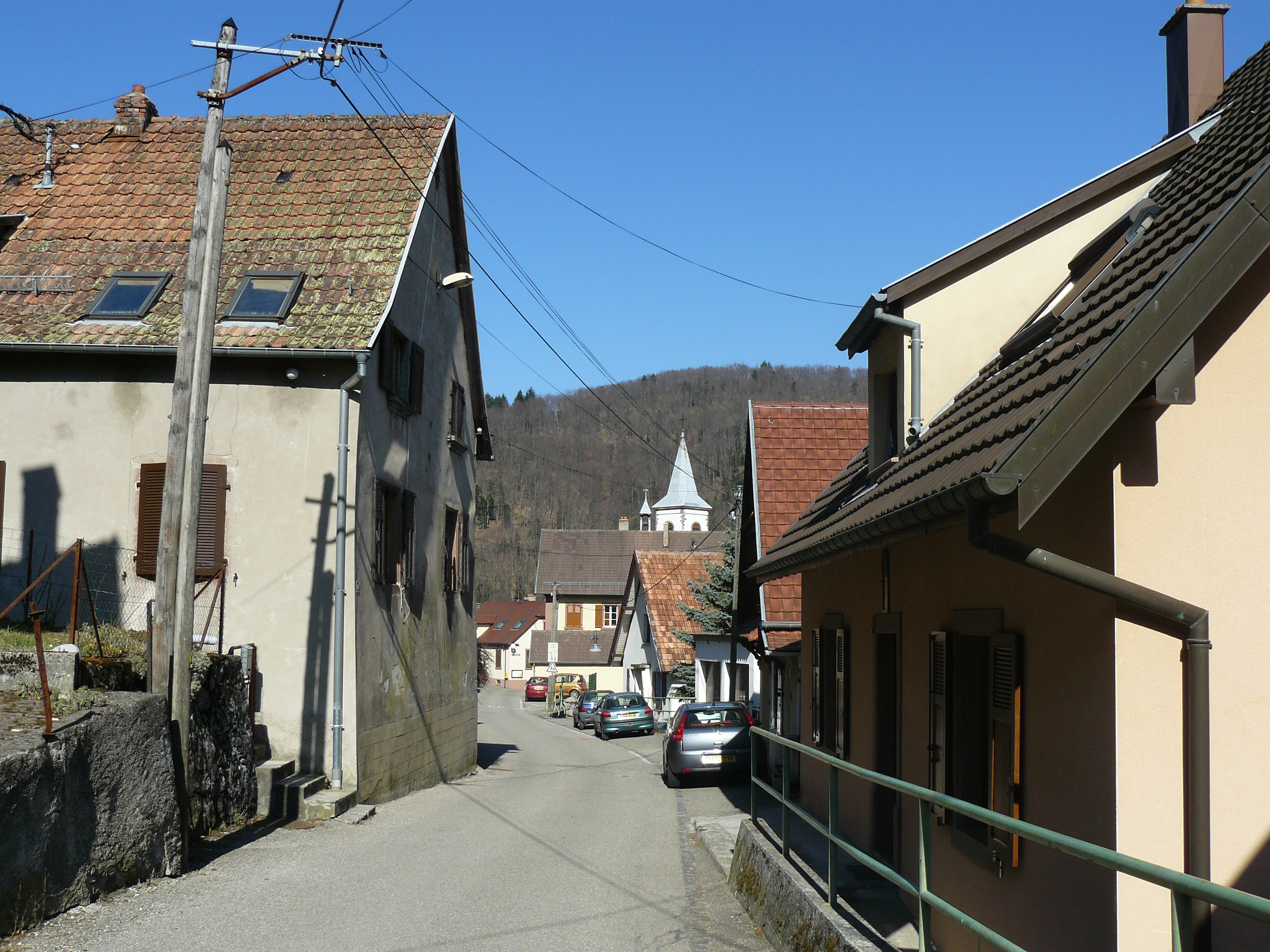
- A view within Rimbachzell

- Coat of arms
- Location of Rimbachzell
- Location within France Location within Grand Est
- Coordinates: 47°54′04″N 7°10′37″E
- Country: France
- Region: Grand Est
- Department: Haut-Rhin
- Arrondissement: Thann-Guebwiller
- Canton: Guebwiller
- Intercommunality: Région de Guebwiller

Government
  - Mayor (2020–2026): Angélique Muller
- Area^{1}: 1.79 km^{2} (0.69 sq mi)
- Elevation: 480 m (1,570 ft)
- Highest elevation: 860 m (2,820 ft)
- Lowest elevation: 356 m (1,168 ft)
- Population (2023): 188
  - Density: 105/km^{2} (272/sq mi)
- Time zone: UTC+01:00 (CET)
  - Summer (DST): UTC+02:00 (CEST)
- INSEE/Postal code: 68276 /68500
- ^{1} French Land Register data, which excludes lakes, ponds, glaciers > 1 km^{2} (0.386 sq mi or 247 acres) and river estuaries.

Rimbachzell is a commune in the Haut-Rhin department in Grand Est in north-eastern France.

== See also ==
- Communes of the Haut-Rhin department
