= Rimbach-près-Guebwiller =

Commune in Grand Est, France

- Commune
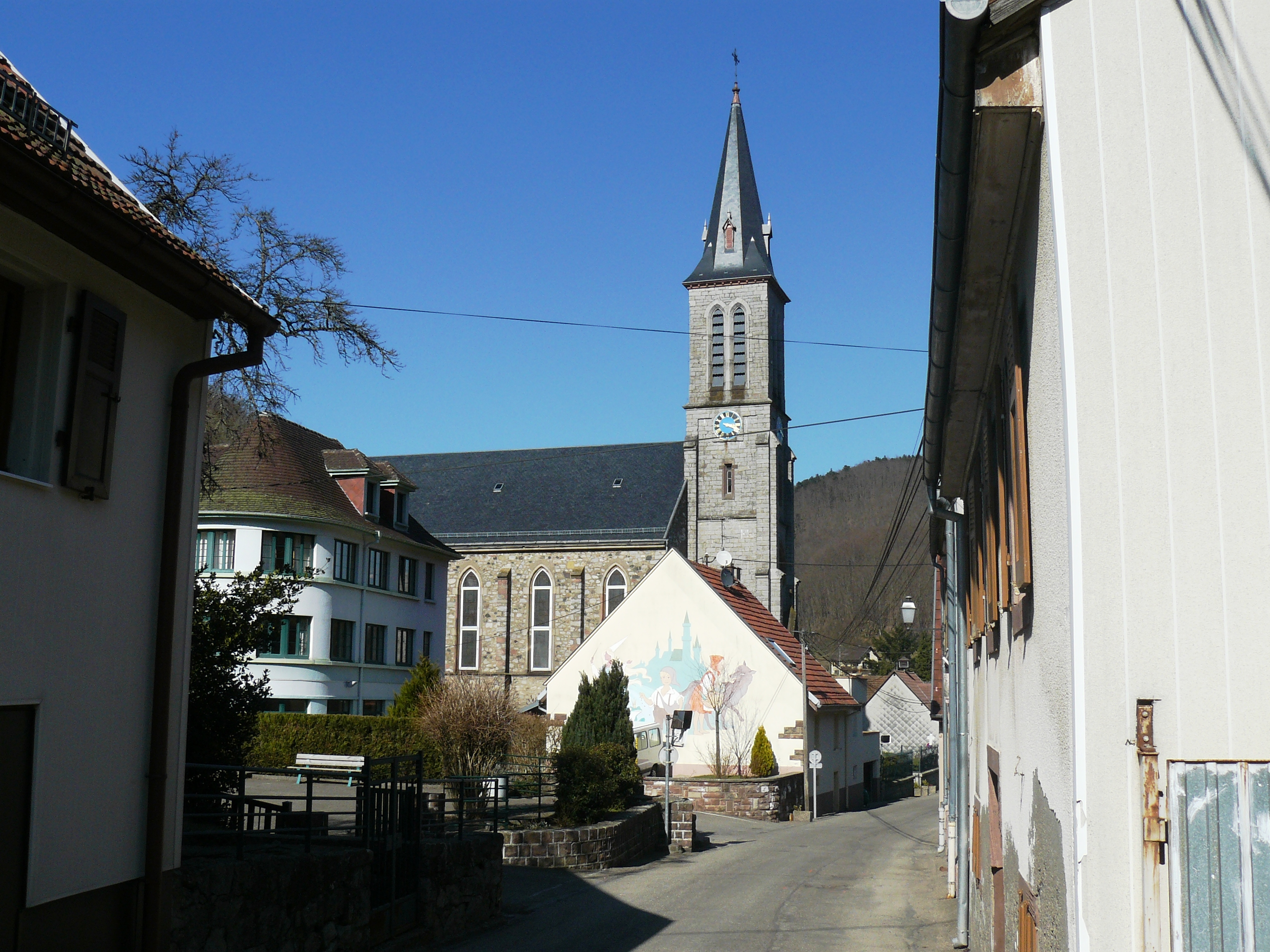
- The church in Rimbach-près-Guebwiller

- Coat of arms
- Location of Rimbach-près-Guebwiller
- Location within France Location within Grand Est
- Coordinates: 47°54′19″N 7°09′23″E
- Country: France
- Region: Grand Est
- Department: Haut-Rhin
- Arrondissement: Thann-Guebwiller
- Canton: Guebwiller
- Intercommunality: Région de Guebwiller

Government
  - Mayor (2020–2026): Alain Furstenberger
- Area^{1}: 4.84 km^{2} (1.87 sq mi)
- Elevation: 550 m (1,800 ft)
- Highest elevation: 1,242 m (4,075 ft)
- Lowest elevation: 357 m (1,171 ft)
- Population (2023): 216
  - Density: 44.6/km^{2} (116/sq mi)
- Time zone: UTC+01:00 (CET)
  - Summer (DST): UTC+02:00 (CEST)
- INSEE/Postal code: 68274 /68500
- ^{1} French Land Register data, which excludes lakes, ponds, glaciers > 1 km^{2} (0.386 sq mi or 247 acres) and river estuaries.

Rimbach-près-Guebwiller (German: Rimbach bei Gebweiler) is a commune in the Haut-Rhin department in Grand Est in north-eastern France.

== See also ==
- Communes of the Haut-Rhin department
