= Friedrich Wilhelm von Bergholz =

German courtier

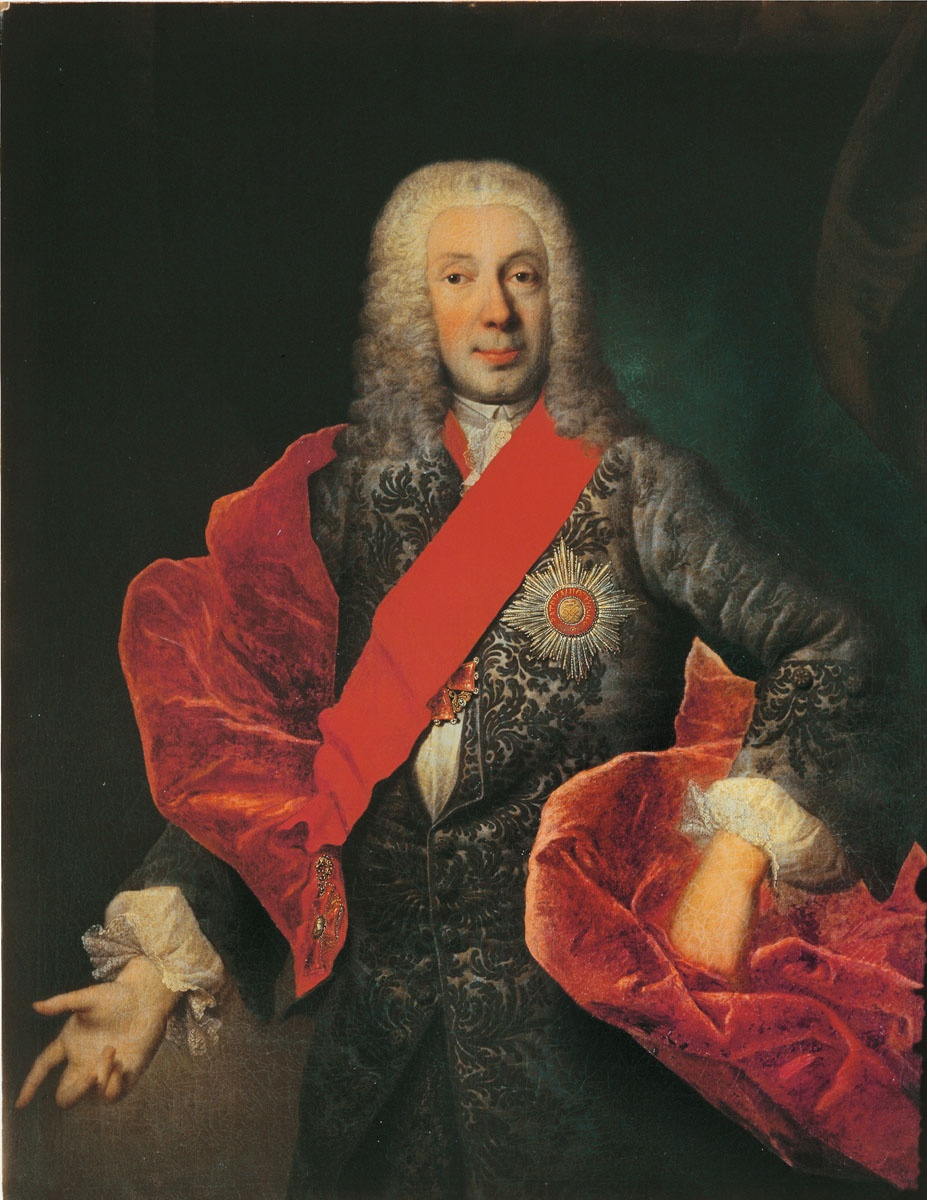

Friedrich Wilhelm von Bergholz (1699–1765) was a courtier from Holstein. His father was Wilhelm Bergholtz.

In 1721 he accompanied Charles Frederick, Duke of Holstein-Gottorp on his visit to Russia, staying there with him until 1727.

In 1953 the article about him in the Great Soviet Encyclopedia was substantially expanded following the fall from power of Lavrentiy Beria

== Literature ==
- Elizabeth Clara Sander: Social Dancing in Peter the Great's Russia: Observations by Holstein Nobleman Friedrich Wilhelm von Bergholz, 1721 to 1725, 2007
