= Bergholtz, Haut-Rhin =

Commune in Grand Est, France

Bergholtz
- Commune
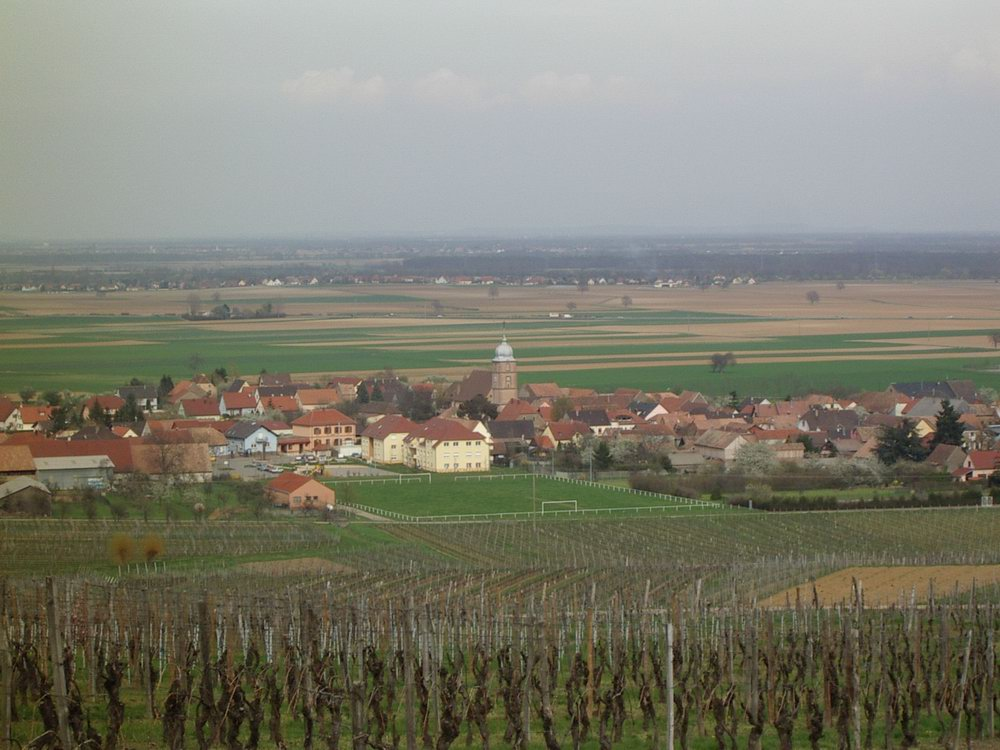
- A general view of Bergholtz

- Coat of arms
- Location of Bergholtz
- Location within France Location within Grand Est
- Coordinates: 47°55′03″N 7°14′48″E
- Country: France
- Region: Grand Est
- Department: Haut-Rhin
- Arrondissement: Thann-Guebwiller
- Canton: Guebwiller
- Intercommunality: Région de Guebwiller

Government
  - Mayor (2020–2026): Jean-Luc Galliath
- Area^{1}: 4.24 km^{2} (1.64 sq mi)
- Elevation: 240 m (790 ft)
- Highest elevation: 574 m (1,883 ft)
- Lowest elevation: 222 m (728 ft)
- Population (2023): 1,039
  - Density: 245/km^{2} (635/sq mi)
- Time zone: UTC+01:00 (CET)
  - Summer (DST): UTC+02:00 (CEST)
- INSEE/Postal code: 68029 /68500
- ^{1} French Land Register data, which excludes lakes, ponds, glaciers > 1 km^{2} (0.386 sq mi or 247 acres) and river estuaries.

Bergholtz (French pronunciation: [bɛʁɡɔlts]; German: Bergholz) is a commune in the Haut-Rhin department in Grand Est in north-eastern France, and, since 1 January 2021, the European collectivity of Alsace. The commune is in the historic and cultural region of Alsace.

Its inhabitants are known as Bergholtzois (plural: Bergholtzoises).

== Geography ==
Situated at the midpoint between Colmar and Mulhouse (23 km from Mulhouse and 25 km from Colmar) and at the mouth of the Guebwiller valley, Bergholtz backs onto limestone hills under the Vosges, and largely opens up in the east on a plane of the Rhine onto a low-lying terrace of loess, which offers excellent agricultural land. The village was developed along the lengths of two perpendicular paths, one of which connects to Guebwiller by following a line along the slope between the plain and the hill, and the other surrounds the mouth, towards the localities in the valley of Orschwihr.

The name Bergholtz seems to indicate that the village left its original resources that came from the destruction of the forest which must have covered Schwartzberg ('Black Mountain'). However, the exposed slopes must have been converted into vineyards quite early on. In the eighteenth century, the wine of Bergholtz was renowned. After a continuous decrease since the end of the nineteenth century, largely because of the industrialisation of the Guebwiller valley, agriculture returned in the twentieth century, becoming a more common activity.

It is one of 188 communes of the Ballons des Vosges Nature Park.

== Town Planning ==
Bergholz is an urban commune, because it belongs to a dense commune or one of intermediate density, according to the grid of communal density from the INSEE. The commune is also outside of the sphere of influence of a city.

== See also ==
- Communes of the Haut-Rhin department
