= Wilhelm Bergholtz =

German military officer

Wilhelm Bergholtz was a German military officer from Holstein. He moved to the Russian Empire in 1709 at the rank of major-general, and spent five years there. After his arrival and the beginning of his service to the Russian Empire, the Great Northern War broke out. During this time he distinguished himself at the Siege of Viborg in 1710 and in a repulse of Ottoman forces during the ultimately unsuccessful Pruth Campaign.

His son was Friedrich Wilhelm von Bergholz.
