= Canton of Guebwiller =

Coordinates: 47.91°N 7.21°E

The canton of Guebwiller is an administrative division of the Haut-Rhin department, northeastern France. Its borders were modified at the French canton reorganisation which came into effect in March 2015. Its seat is in Guebwiller.

It consists of the following communes:

1. Bergholtz
2. Bergholtzzell
3. Buhl
4. Guebwiller
5. Hartmannswiller
6. Issenheim
7. Jungholtz
8. Lautenbach
9. Lautenbachzell
10. Linthal
11. Merxheim
12. Murbach
13. Orschwihr
14. Raedersheim
15. Rimbach-près-Guebwiller
16. Rimbachzell
17. Soultz-Haut-Rhin
18. Wuenheim
