= Lautenbachzell =

Commune in Grand Est, France

- Commune
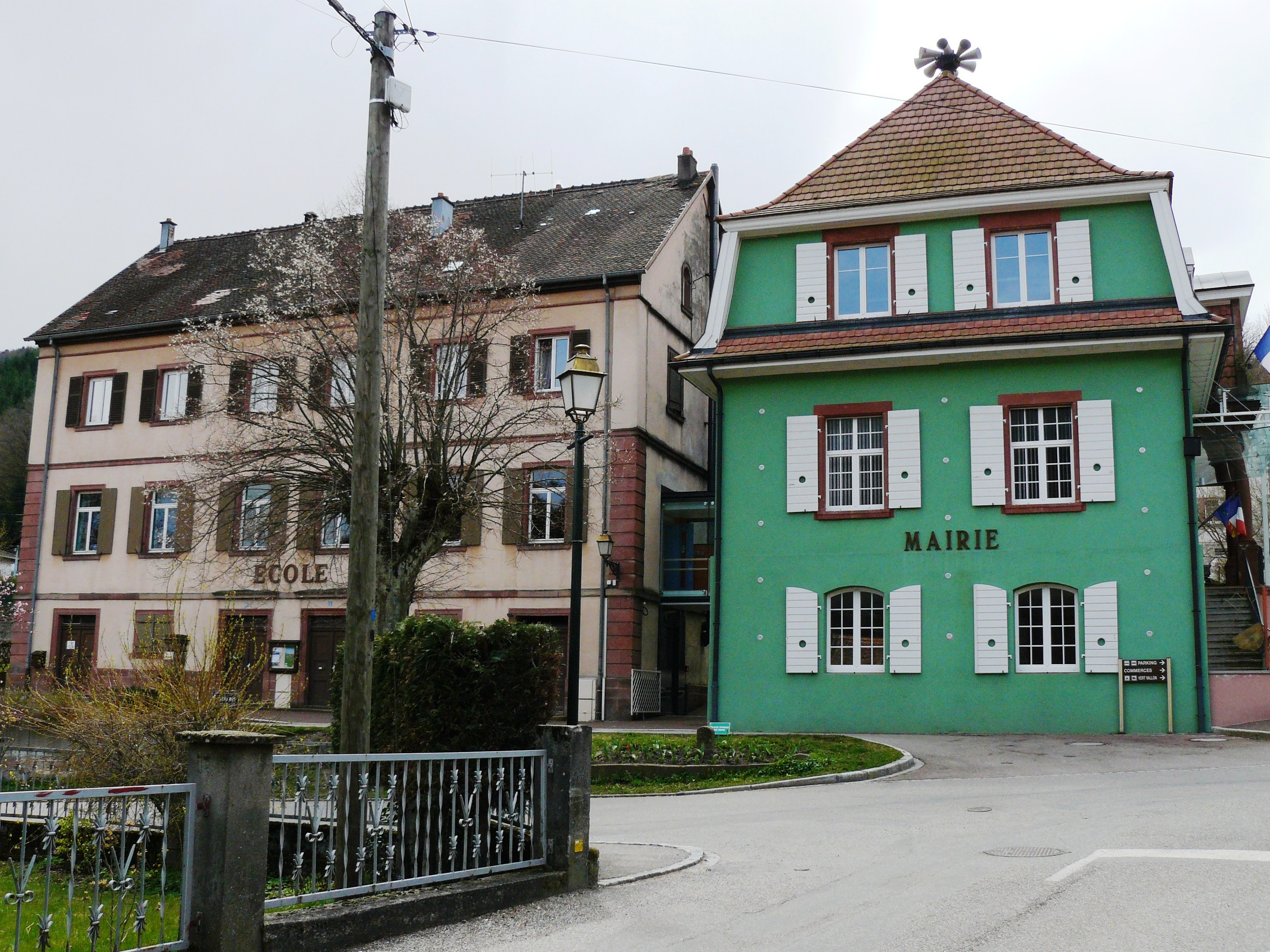
- The town hall and school in Lautenbachzell

- Coat of arms
- Location of Lautenbachzell
- Location within France Location within Grand Est
- Coordinates: 47°56′28″N 7°09′00″E
- Country: France
- Region: Grand Est
- Department: Haut-Rhin
- Arrondissement: Thann-Guebwiller
- Canton: Guebwiller
- Intercommunality: Région de Guebwiller

Government
  - Mayor (2020–2026): Jean-Jacques Fischer
- Area^{1}: 23.14 km^{2} (8.93 sq mi)
- Elevation: 425 m (1,394 ft)
- Highest elevation: 1,420 m (4,660 ft)
- Lowest elevation: 368 m (1,207 ft)
- Population (2023): 942
  - Density: 40.7/km^{2} (105/sq mi)
- Time zone: UTC+01:00 (CET)
  - Summer (DST): UTC+02:00 (CEST)
- INSEE/Postal code: 68178 /68610
- ^{1} French Land Register data, which excludes lakes, ponds, glaciers > 1 km^{2} (0.386 sq mi or 247 acres) and river estuaries.

Lautenbachzell is a commune in the Haut-Rhin department in Grand Est in north-eastern France.

== See also ==
- Communes of the Haut-Rhin département
