= Niederentzen =

Commune in Grand Est, France

- Commune
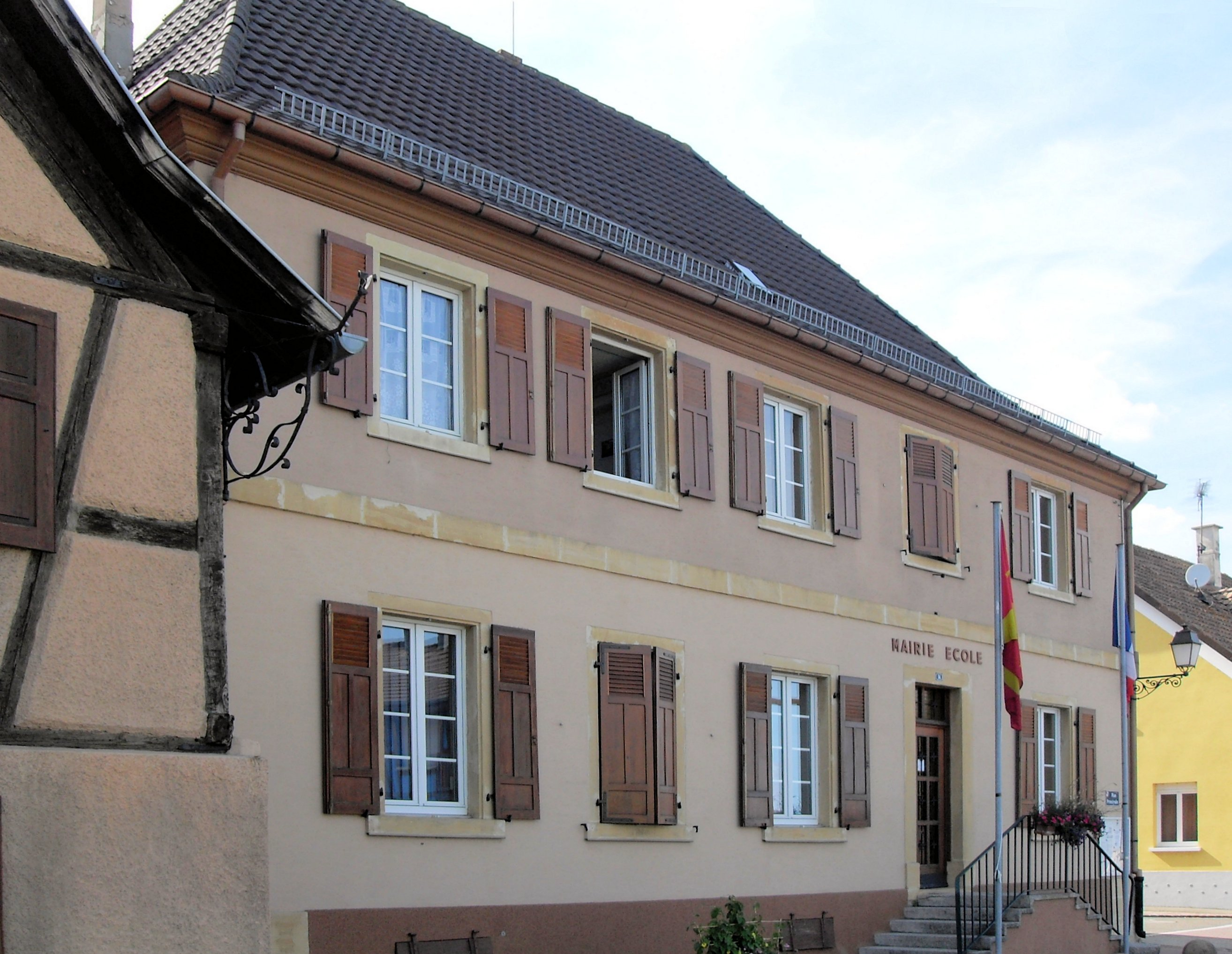
- The town hall and school in Niederentzen

- Coat of arms
- Location of Niederentzen
- Location within France Location within Grand Est
- Coordinates: 47°56′55″N 7°22′55″E
- Country: France
- Region: Grand Est
- Department: Haut-Rhin
- Arrondissement: Thann-Guebwiller
- Canton: Ensisheim
- Intercommunality: Centre Haut-Rhin

Government
  - Mayor (2020–2026): Jean-Pierre Widmer
- Area^{1}: 8.81 km^{2} (3.40 sq mi)
- Elevation: 205 m (673 ft)
- Highest elevation: 209 m (686 ft)
- Lowest elevation: 201 m (659 ft)
- Population (2023): 857
  - Density: 97.3/km^{2} (252/sq mi)
- Time zone: UTC+01:00 (CET)
  - Summer (DST): UTC+02:00 (CEST)
- INSEE/Postal code: 68234 /68127
- ^{1} French Land Register data, which excludes lakes, ponds, glaciers > 1 km^{2} (0.386 sq mi or 247 acres) and river estuaries.

Niederentzen (German: Niederenzen) is a commune in the Haut-Rhin department in Grand Est in north-eastern France.

== Geography ==
The village of Niederentzen was established between the Vosges and the Rhine on the left bank of the Ill, at an altitude of 205 meters. It has an area of 8.81 square kilometres. It stretches between the Forest of the Thur and the vestiges of the Forest of Hardt. The wooded area is 1.35 km^{2} (0.52 sq mi) and 7.25 km^{2} (2.80 sq mi) is assigned to agriculture. The local climate is characterized by weak precipitation, 539 mm per annum on average, and an average annual temperature of 10.2 °C.

== History ==
In this area a place called "Giessen" was discovered, along with tombs, jewels and ceramics dating from the first period of the Iron Age to the end of the Bronze Age.

The name (Nidern Enszheim 1276) is a contraction of "Nieder-Ensisheim" ("Nieder": lower). Niederentzen and Oberentzen were originally a single holding. In the thirteenth century, this holding was dissociated and Niederentzen became part of the territory of Murbach Abbey. In 1358, the village was taken by the Habsburgs, who gave it first to the lords of Hattstatt, and then, on their extinction (1585), to the Swiss noble family of Truchsess von Rheinfelden. Jean-Melchior Truchsess von Rheinfelden, who died in 1699, returned the property to the church. After the French Revolution, Niederentzen became part of Ensisheim.

During the nineteenth century, the American businessman Henri Castro offered lands in the state of Texas. Some inhabitants of Niederentzen responded and settled in Castroville and D'Hanis. This second city is currently twinned with Niederentzen; a portion of the village bears its name.

=== Coat of arms ===
The coat of arms of the village of Niederentzen was created in 1978 by M. Lucien Bilger, then mayor of the commune. It combines elements of the armorial bearings of the Hattstatt lords and the Truchsess nobles, illustrating the history of the village.

== Administration ==
List of mayors
Date of election	Name	Action
The data before 1977 is unknown.
March 1977	M. Lucien Bilger	Builds a vacation home
March 2001	M. Jean-Pierre Widmer	Builds the fire department, the war memorial...

== Demographics ==
Historical population
Year	Pop.	±% p.a.
1968	226	—
1975	263	+2.19%
1982	312	+2.47%
1990	320	+0.32%
1999	322	+0.07%
2007	363	+1.51%
2012	544	+8.43%
2017	715	+5.62%
2023	857	+3.07%
Source: INSEE

== See also ==
- Communes of the Haut-Rhin department
