= Feldkirch, Haut-Rhin =

Feldkirch
- Commune
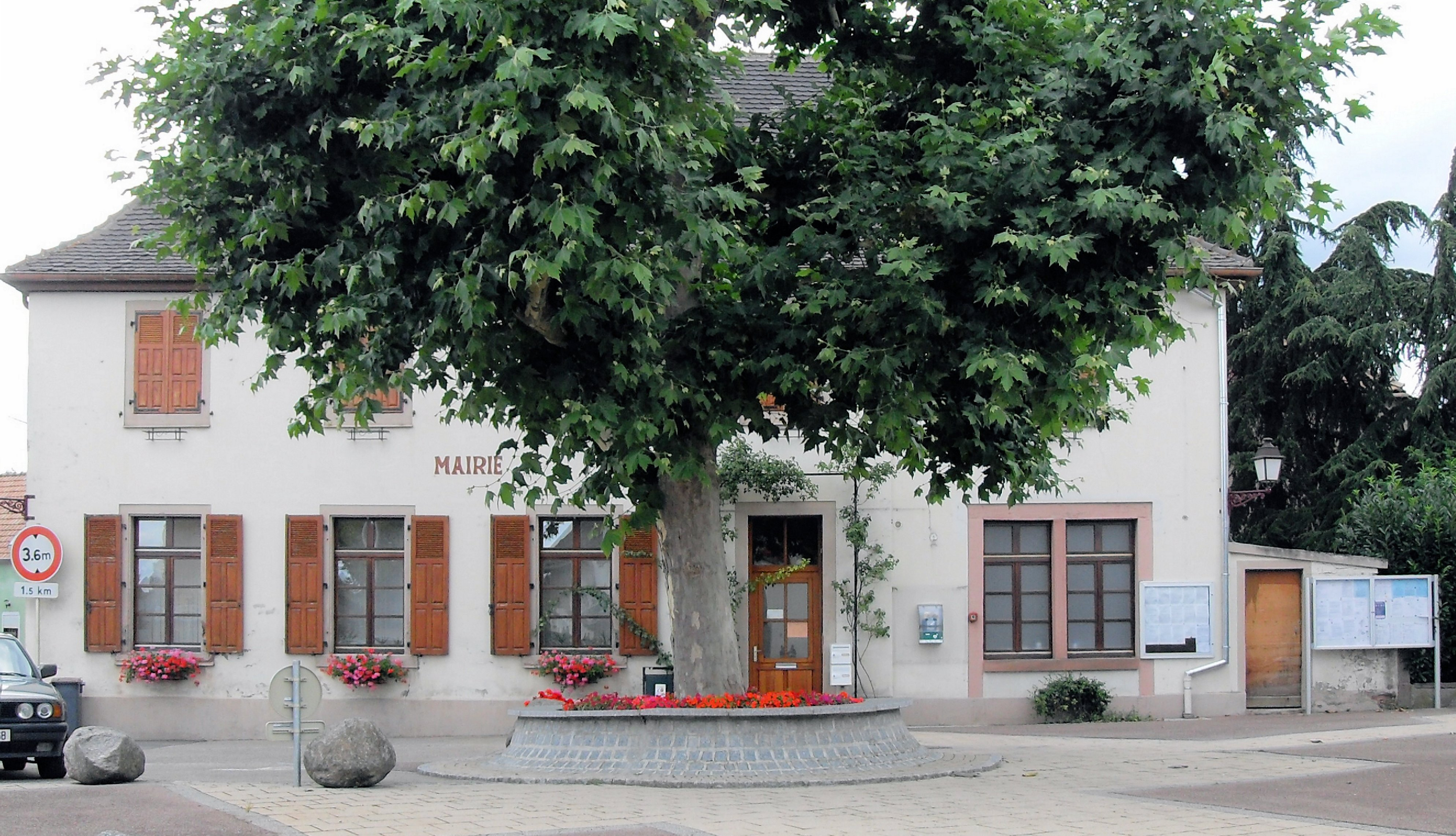
- Town hall of Feldkirch

- Coat of arms
- Location of Feldkirch
- Location within France Location within Grand Est
- Coordinates: 47°51′53″N 7°16′23″E
- Country: France
- Region: Grand Est
- Department: Haut-Rhin
- Arrondissement: Mulhouse
- Canton: Wittenheim
- Intercommunality: Mulhouse Alsace Agglomération

Government
  - Mayor (2023–2026): Nicole Blumstein
- Area^{1}: 4.21 km^{2} (1.63 sq mi)
- Elevation: 230 m (750 ft)
- Highest elevation: 249 m (817 ft)
- Lowest elevation: 222 m (728 ft)
- Population (2023): 1,047
  - Density: 249/km^{2} (644/sq mi)
- Time zone: UTC+01:00 (CET)
  - Summer (DST): UTC+02:00 (CEST)
- INSEE/Postal code: 68088 /68540
- ^{1} French Land Register data, which excludes lakes, ponds, glaciers > 1 km^{2} (0.386 sq mi or 247 acres) and river estuaries.

Feldkirch (French pronunciation: [fɛltkiʁʃ]) is a commune in the Haut-Rhin department in Grand Est in north-eastern France. It forms part of the Mulhouse Alsace Agglomération, the inter-communal local government body for the Mulhouse conurbation.

== See also ==
- Communes of the Haut-Rhin département
