= Wuenheim =

Commune in Grand Est, France

Wuenheim Wüene
- Commune
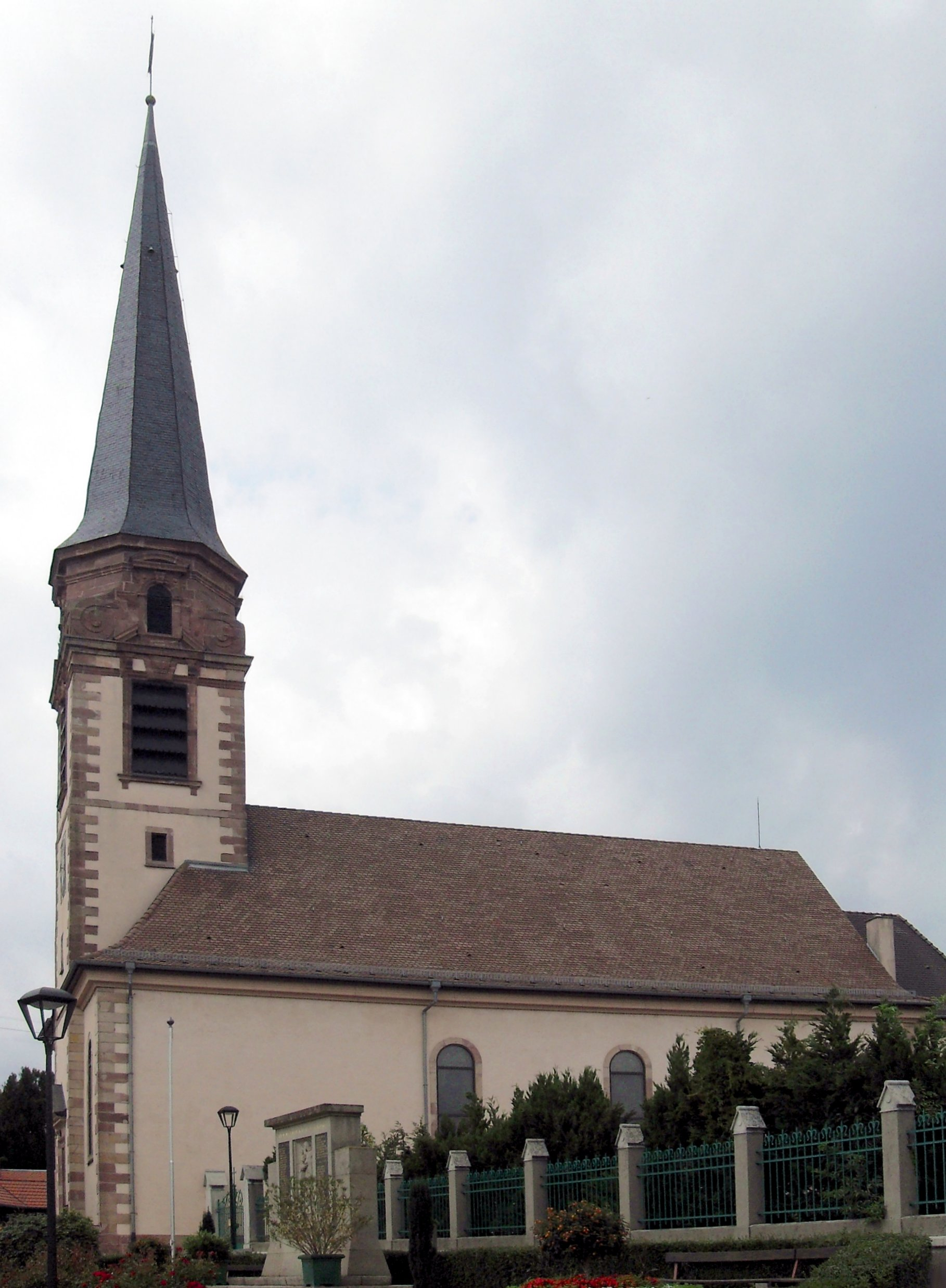
- The church in Wuenheim

- Coat of arms
- Location of Wuenheim
- Location within France Location within Grand Est
- Coordinates: 47°52′25″N 7°12′34″E
- Country: France
- Region: Grand Est
- Department: Haut-Rhin
- Arrondissement: Thann-Guebwiller
- Canton: Guebwiller
- Intercommunality: Région de Guebwiller

Government
  - Mayor (2020–2026): Roland Martin
- Area^{1}: 6.17 km^{2} (2.38 sq mi)
- Elevation: 310 m (1,020 ft)
- Highest elevation: 956 m (3,136 ft)
- Lowest elevation: 257 m (843 ft)
- Population (2023): 768
  - Density: 124/km^{2} (322/sq mi)
- Time zone: UTC+01:00 (CET)
  - Summer (DST): UTC+02:00 (CEST)
- INSEE/Postal code: 68381 /68500
- ^{1} French Land Register data, which excludes lakes, ponds, glaciers > 1 km^{2} (0.386 sq mi or 247 acres) and river estuaries.

Wuenheim (French pronunciation: [vynaim]; German: Wünheim; Alsatian: Wüena) is a commune in the Haut-Rhin department in Grand Est in north-eastern France.

== Population ==
Historical population
Year	Pop.	±% p.a.
1968	693	—
1975	718	+0.51%
1982	756	+0.74%
1990	800	+0.71%
1999	850	+0.68%
2007	811	−0.59%
2012	783	−0.70%
2017	799	+0.41%
2023	768	−0.66%
Source: INSEE

== See also ==
- Communes of the Haut-Rhin department
