= Lautenbach, Haut-Rhin =

Commune in Grand Est, France

Lautenbach
- Commune
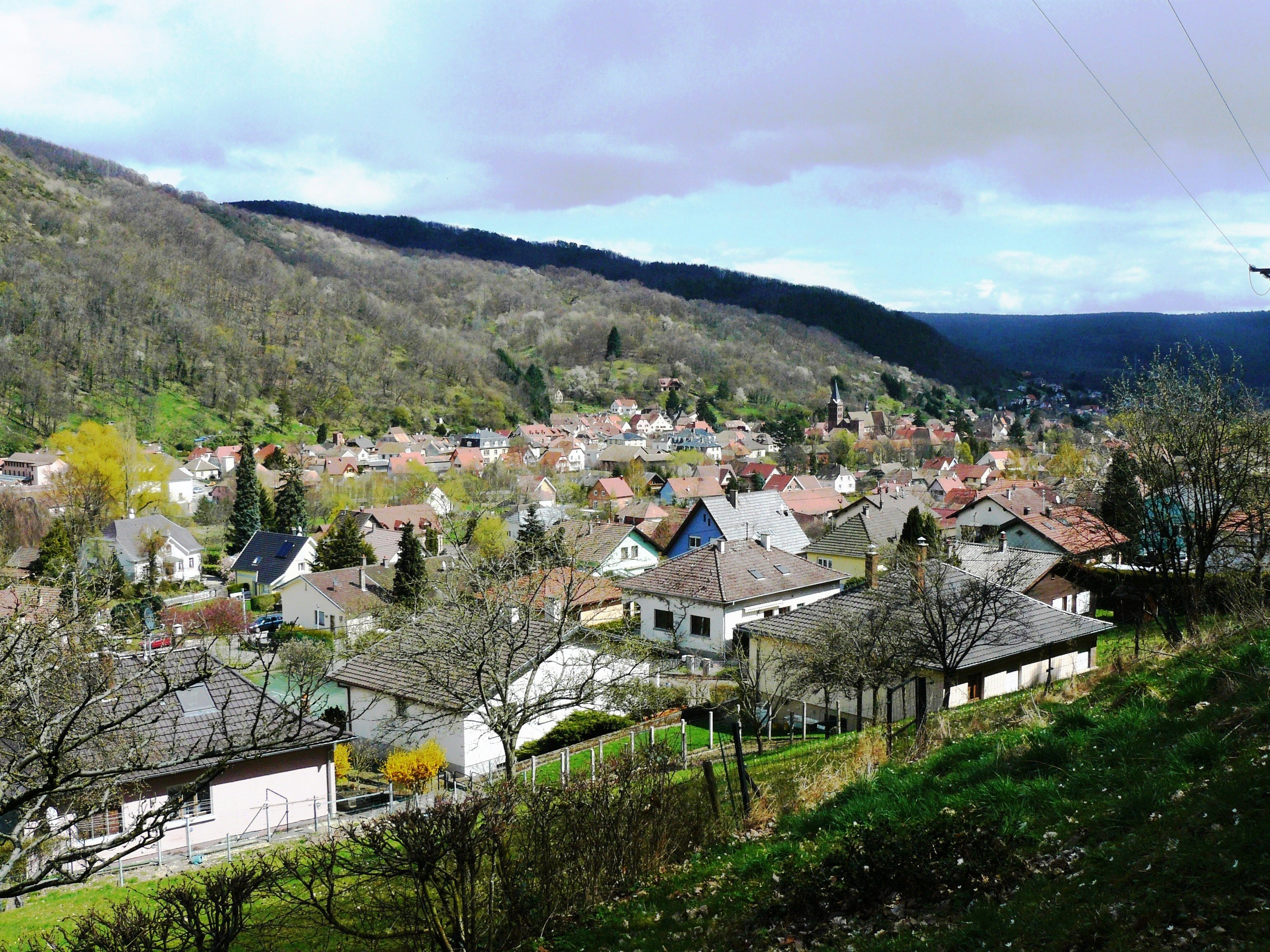
- A general view of Lautenbach

- Coat of arms
- Location of Lautenbach
- Location within France Location within Grand Est
- Coordinates: 47°56′30″N 7°09′34″E
- Country: France
- Region: Grand Est
- Department: Haut-Rhin
- Arrondissement: Thann-Guebwiller
- Canton: Guebwiller
- Intercommunality: Région de Guebwiller

Government
  - Mayor (2020–2026): Philippe Hecky
- Area^{1}: 13.02 km^{2} (5.03 sq mi)
- Elevation: 394 m (1,293 ft)
- Highest elevation: 1,160 m (3,810 ft)
- Lowest elevation: 353 m (1,158 ft)
- Population (2023): 1,544
  - Density: 118.6/km^{2} (307.1/sq mi)
- Time zone: UTC+01:00 (CET)
  - Summer (DST): UTC+02:00 (CEST)
- INSEE/Postal code: 68177 /68610
- ^{1} French Land Register data, which excludes lakes, ponds, glaciers > 1 km^{2} (0.386 sq mi or 247 acres) and river estuaries.

Lautenbach is a commune in the Haut-Rhin department in Grand Est in north-eastern France.

== See also ==
- Communes of the Haut-Rhin département
