= Berrwiller =

Commune in Grand Est, France

- Commune
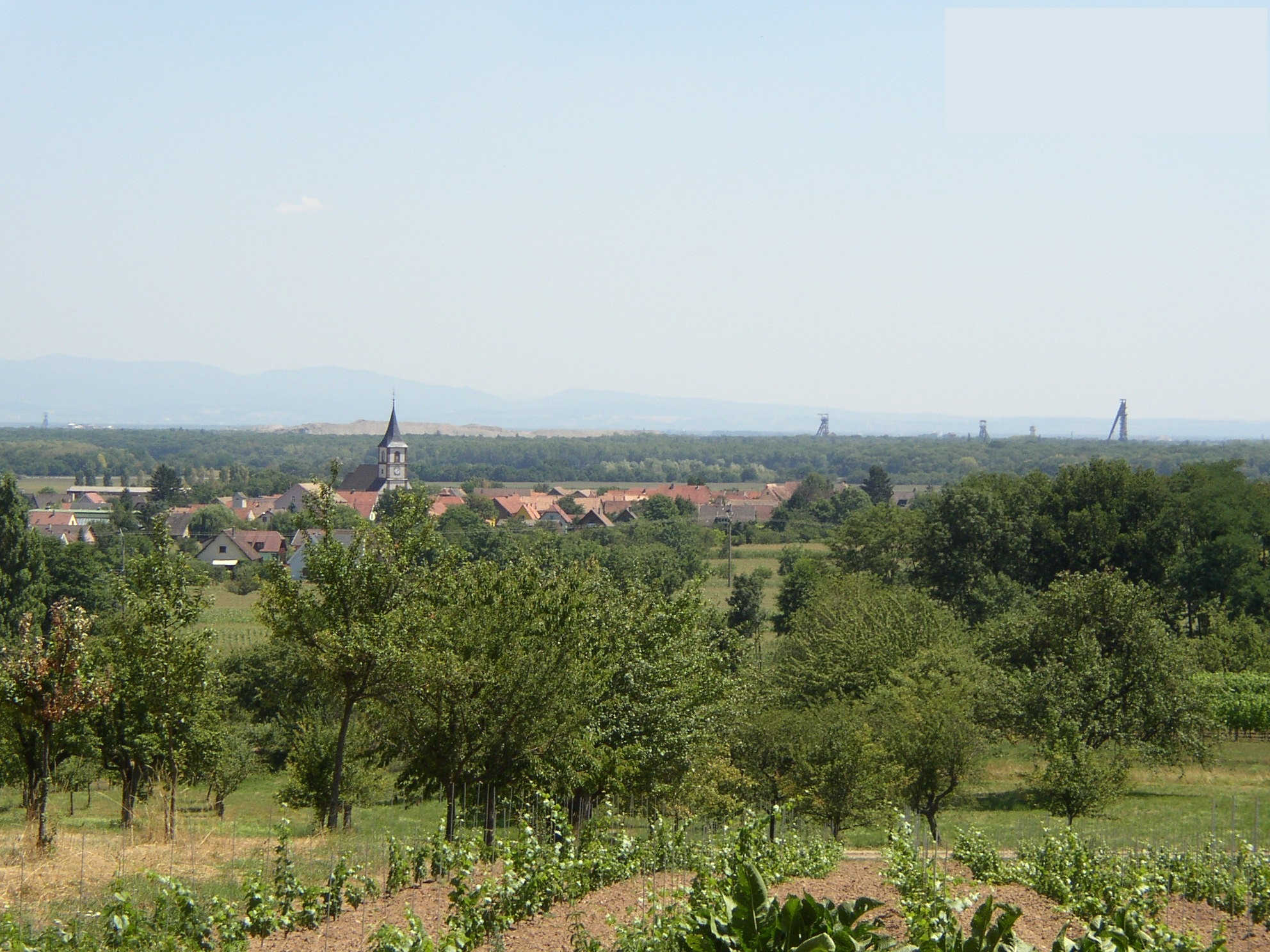
- A general view of Berrwiller

- Coat of arms
- Location of Berrwiller
- Location within France Location within Grand Est
- Coordinates: 47°51′01″N 7°13′12″E
- Country: France
- Region: Grand Est
- Department: Haut-Rhin
- Arrondissement: Mulhouse
- Canton: Wittenheim
- Intercommunality: Mulhouse Alsace Agglomération

Government
  - Mayor (2020–2026): Fabian Jordan
- Area^{1}: 7.66 km^{2} (2.96 sq mi)
- Elevation: 255 m (837 ft)
- Highest elevation: 360 m (1,180 ft)
- Lowest elevation: 244 m (801 ft)
- Population (2023): 1,294
  - Density: 169/km^{2} (438/sq mi)
- Time zone: UTC+01:00 (CET)
  - Summer (DST): UTC+02:00 (CEST)
- INSEE/Postal code: 68032 /68500
- Website: www.berrwiller.1s.fr
- ^{1} French Land Register data, which excludes lakes, ponds, glaciers > 1 km^{2} (0.386 sq mi or 247 acres) and river estuaries.

Berrwiller (French pronunciation: [bɛʁvilɛʁ]; dialectal name: Barwillr; German: Berrweiler) is a commune in the Haut-Rhin department in Grand Est in northeastern France. It forms part of the Mulhouse Alsace Agglomération, the inter-communal local government body for the Mulhouse conurbation. Its inhabitants are called the Berrwillerois and Berrwilleroises.

== Geography ==
Berrwiller is located at the foot of Hartmannswillerkopf (“Old Armand”) and is composed of the parts “Owerdorf”, “Unterdorf”, “Leimgrüab”, “Bertschwiller” and “Weckenthal”. In the southeast part of the village are Route nationale#Routes nationales 76 to 100 and in the northwest is the Alsace wine.

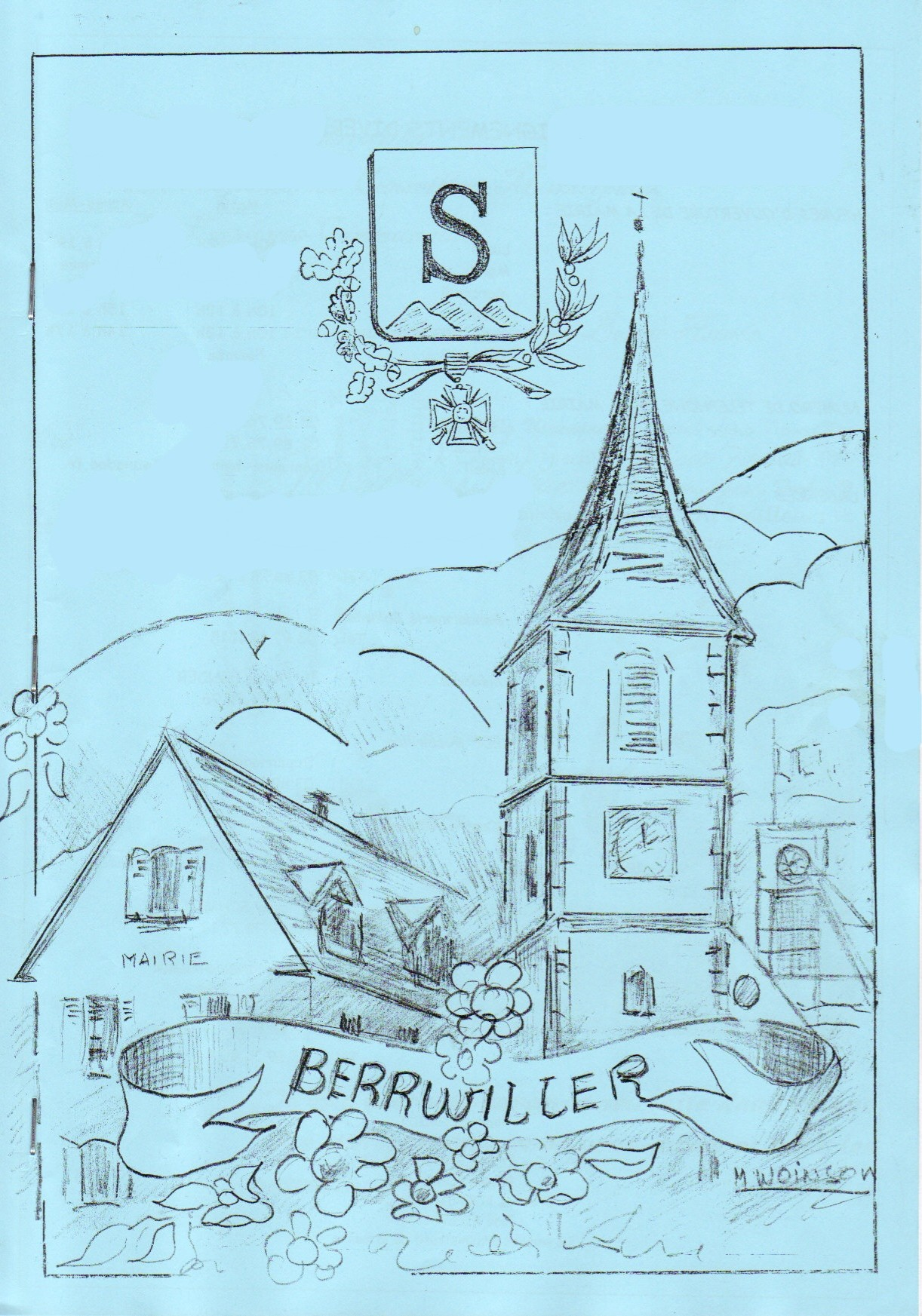
Berrwiller

== History ==
- 796: The first mention of Berrwiller is in the files of Murbach, then under the name of Baronewillare.
- 1441: The document liber marcarum teaches us that there are, in Berrwiller, priest and one vicar and that the church is dedicated to Saint Brigit of Kildare
- 1697: The armorial bearings of Berrwiller (3 mountains of sinople surmounted by a S-shaped hook) appear for the first time in the armorial of the General information of Alsace.
- 1766: Construction of the current church to replace the old church out of wood.
- 1853: Construction of the current cemetery.
- 1865: Creation of the first body of the firemen of Berrwiller
- 1885: Construction of the communal Lavoir; there remains nothing any more but the basin.
- 1907: First phone line in the village
- 1912: The electrification of the first streets and houses
- 1914: Evacuation of the village in December, because it was located on the front line in World War I.
- 1918: Return of population, a third destroyed and 21 soldiers of the village dead.
- 1945: Release of the village on 4 February.
- 1953: Installation of mains drainage and running water
- 1960: Construction of the underground mine in Berrwiller of MDPA
- 1976: A serious accident underground in the mine when 5 miners fell.
- 30 June 2007: A motorist deliberately drives their car into members of the public during a village fête, resulting in one fatality and seventeen injured (including two in critical condition).

== Demographics ==
Historical population
Year	Pop.	±% p.a.
1968	719	—
1975	797	+1.48%
1982	870	+1.26%
1990	912	+0.59%
1999	1,058	+1.66%
2007	1,113	+0.64%
2012	1,174	+1.07%
2017	1,192	+0.30%
2023	1,294	+1.38%
Source: INSEE

== Sites and monuments ==
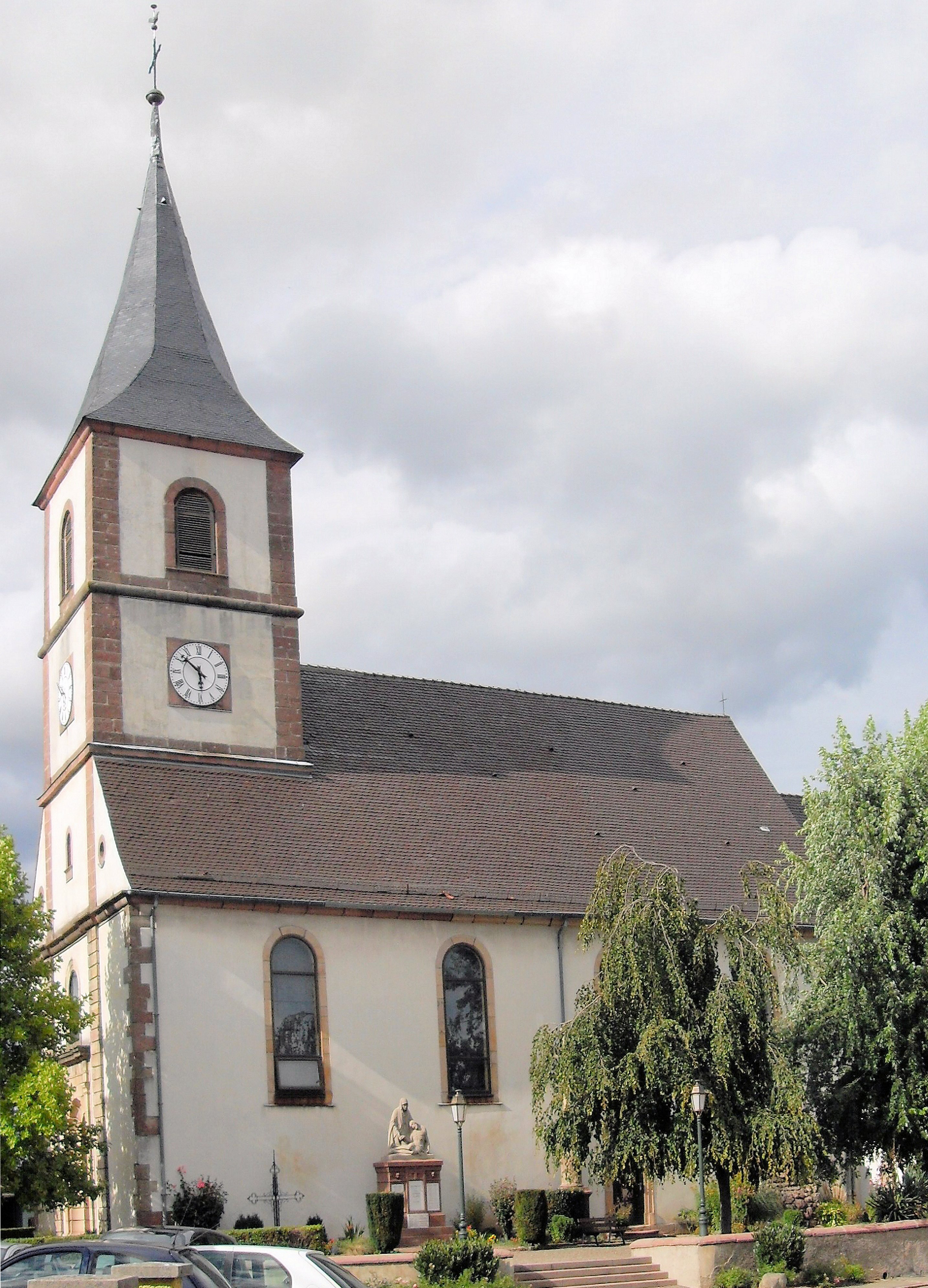
The church Holy-Brigitte of Ireland

Berrwiller has had a church going back to 1766, a house of the 16th century, a presbytery of 1804 and one school of 1860.

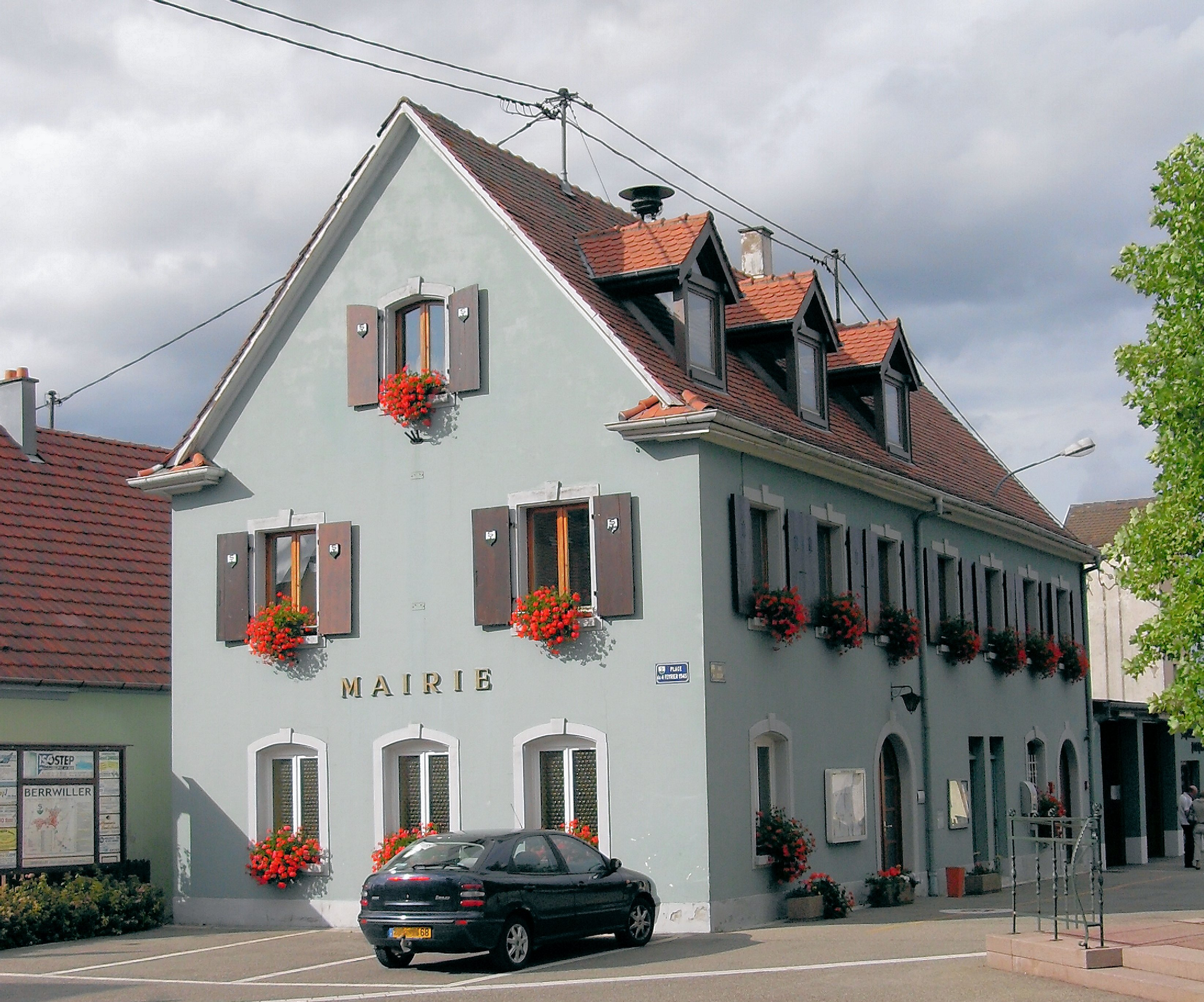
The town hall

== Personalities related to the commune ==
Dr. Colonel Baur was a native of Berrwiller whose name was given to the area's military hospital. Colmar Lucien Herr Directeur was a librarian from the national library in Paris.

== See also ==
- Communes of the Haut-Rhin department Internet site of the commune of Berrwiller
