= Orschwihr =

Commune in Grand Est, France

- Commune
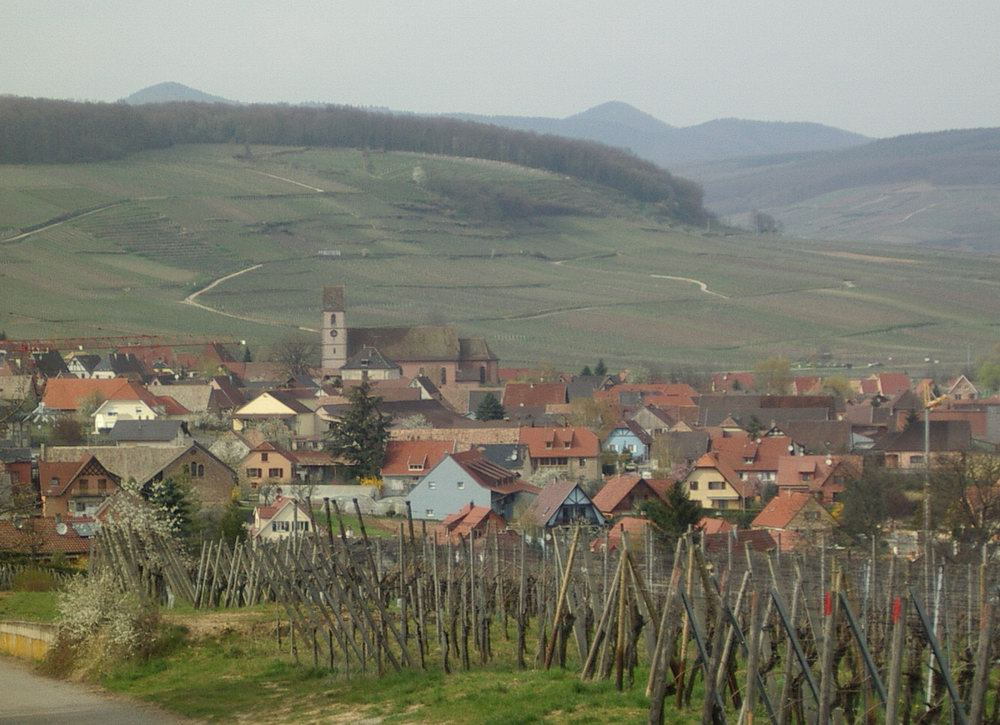
- A general view of Orschwihr

- Coat of arms
- Location of Orschwihr
- Location within France Location within Grand Est
- Coordinates: 47°56′08″N 7°13′59″E
- Country: France
- Region: Grand Est
- Department: Haut-Rhin
- Arrondissement: Thann-Guebwiller
- Canton: Guebwiller
- Intercommunality: Région de Guebwiller

Government
  - Mayor (2020–2026): Marie-Josée Staender
- Area^{1}: 7.09 km^{2} (2.74 sq mi)
- Elevation: 259 m (850 ft)
- Highest elevation: 573 m (1,880 ft)
- Lowest elevation: 225 m (738 ft)
- Population (2023): 1,010
  - Density: 142/km^{2} (369/sq mi)
- Time zone: UTC+01:00 (CET)
  - Summer (DST): UTC+02:00 (CEST)
- INSEE/Postal code: 68250 /68500
- ^{1} French Land Register data, which excludes lakes, ponds, glaciers > 1 km^{2} (0.386 sq mi or 247 acres) and river estuaries.

Orschwihr (French pronunciation: [ɔʁʃviʁ]; German: Orschweier, before 1989: Orschwir) is a commune in the Haut-Rhin department in Grand Est in north-eastern France.

== See also ==
- Communes of the Haut-Rhin department
- Château d'Orschwihr
