= Raedersheim =

Commune in Grand Est, France

- Commune
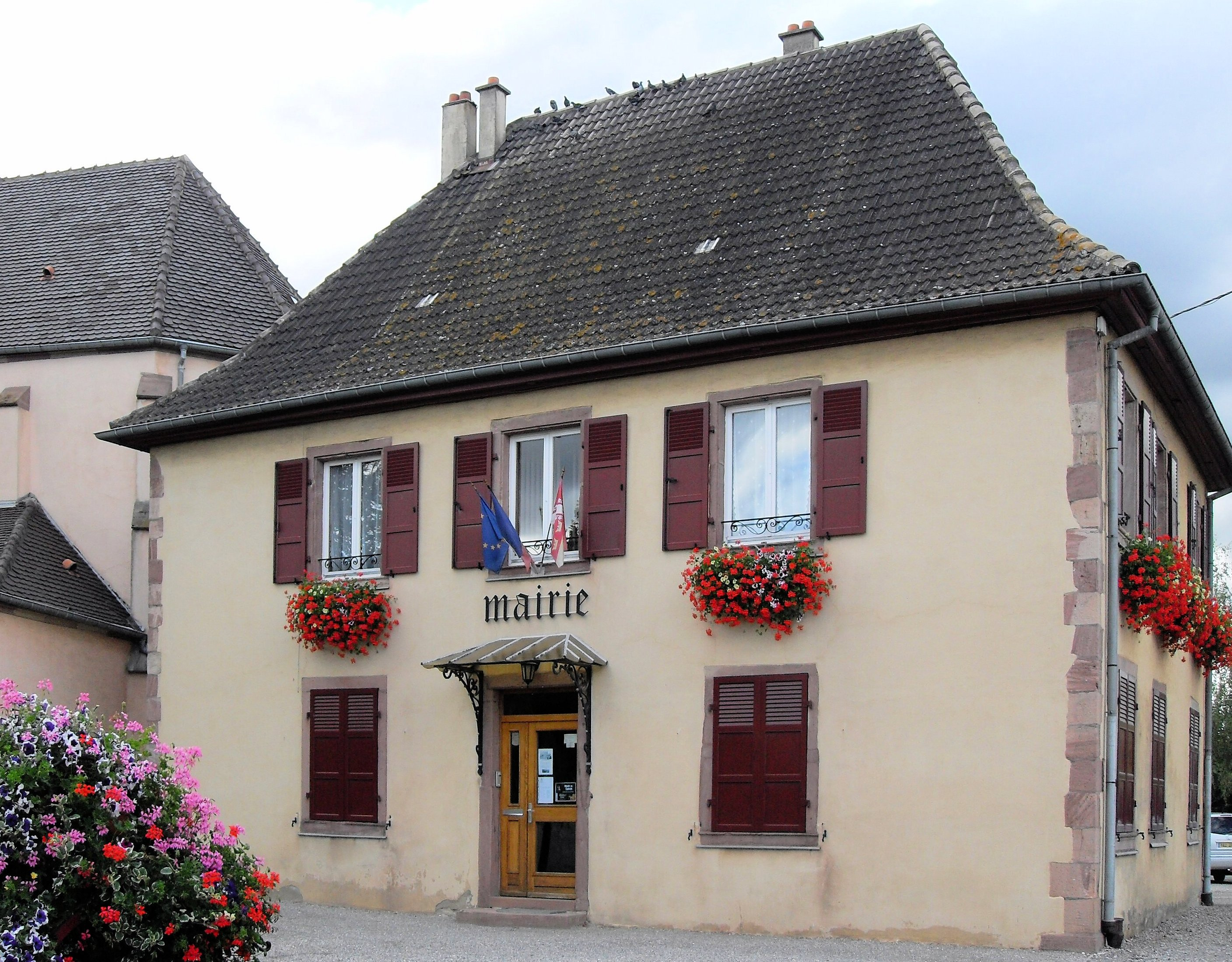
- The town hall

- Coat of arms
- Location of Raedersheim
- Location within France Location within Grand Est
- Coordinates: 47°53′21″N 7°16′56″E
- Country: France
- Region: Grand Est
- Department: Haut-Rhin
- Arrondissement: Thann-Guebwiller
- Canton: Guebwiller
- Intercommunality: Région de Guebwiller

Government
  - Mayor (2020–2026): Jean-Pierre Peltier
- Area^{1}: 5.69 km^{2} (2.20 sq mi)
- Elevation: 228 m (748 ft)
- Highest elevation: 244 m (801 ft)
- Lowest elevation: 219 m (719 ft)
- Population (2023): 1,173
  - Density: 206/km^{2} (534/sq mi)
- Time zone: UTC+01:00 (CET)
  - Summer (DST): UTC+02:00 (CEST)
- INSEE/Postal code: 68260 /68190
- ^{1} French Land Register data, which excludes lakes, ponds, glaciers > 1 km^{2} (0.386 sq mi or 247 acres) and river estuaries.

Raedersheim (French pronunciation: [ʁɛdəʁsaim]; German: Rädersheim) is a commune in the Haut-Rhin department in Grand Est in north-eastern France.

== See also ==
- Communes of the Haut-Rhin department
