= Linthal, Haut-Rhin =

Commune in Grand Est, France

Linthal
- Commune
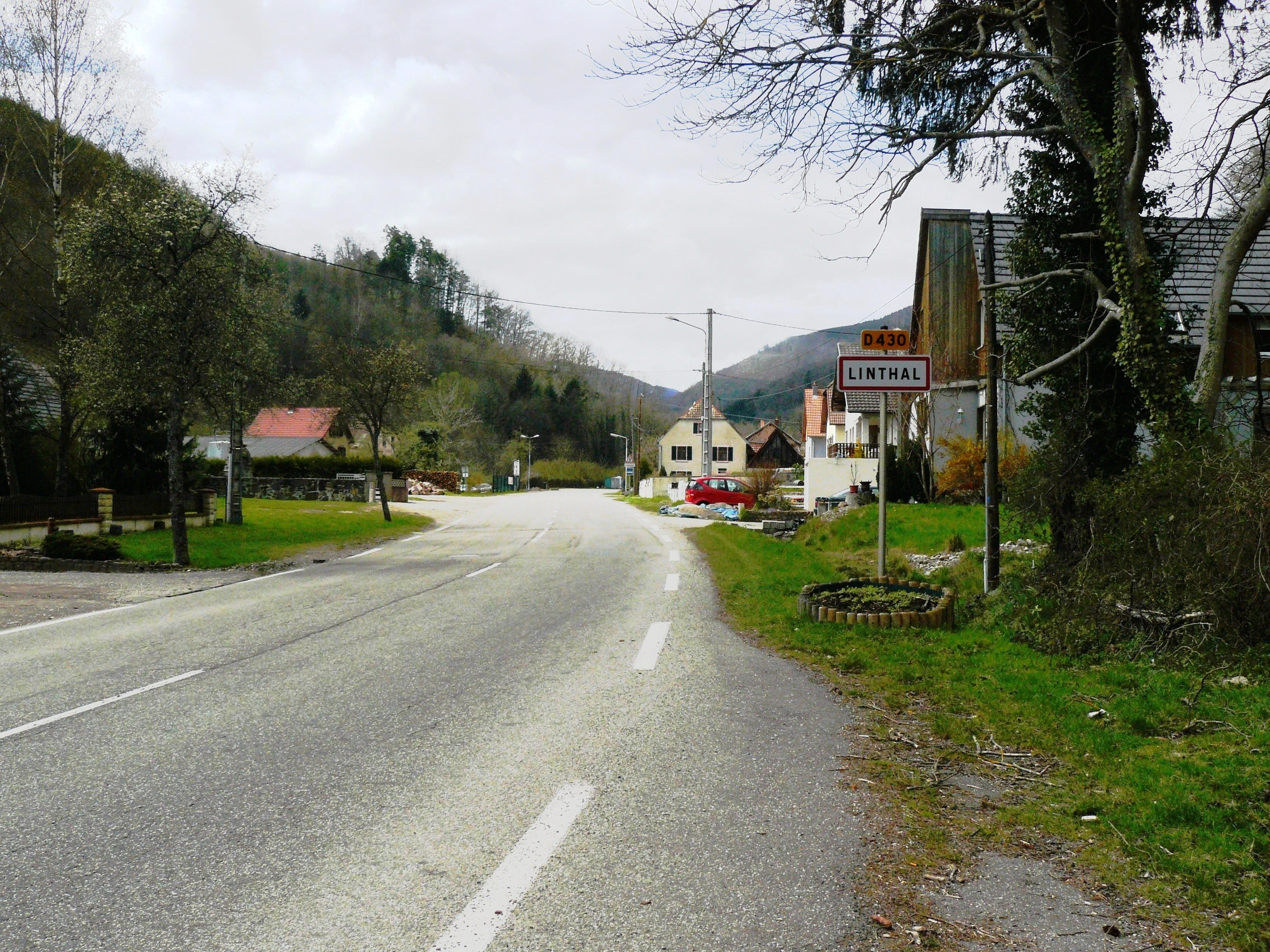
- The southern entrance to the village of Linthal

- Coat of arms
- Location of Linthal
- Location within France Location within Grand Est
- Coordinates: 47°56′51″N 7°07′52″E
- Country: France
- Region: Grand Est
- Department: Haut-Rhin
- Arrondissement: Thann-Guebwiller
- Canton: Guebwiller
- Intercommunality: Région de Guebwiller

Government
  - Mayor (2020–2026): Maurice Kech
- Area^{1}: 20.84 km^{2} (8.05 sq mi)
- Elevation: 497 m (1,631 ft)
- Highest elevation: 1,320 m (4,330 ft)
- Lowest elevation: 429 m (1,407 ft)
- Population (2023): 586
  - Density: 28.1/km^{2} (72.8/sq mi)
- Time zone: UTC+01:00 (CET)
  - Summer (DST): UTC+02:00 (CEST)
- INSEE/Postal code: 68188 /68610
- ^{1} French Land Register data, which excludes lakes, ponds, glaciers > 1 km^{2} (0.386 sq mi or 247 acres) and river estuaries.

Linthal (French pronunciation: [lintal]; Alsatian: Líntel) is a commune in the Haut-Rhin department in Grand Est in north-eastern France.

== See also ==
- Communes of the Haut-Rhin département
