= Issenheim =

Commune in Grand Est, France

- Commune
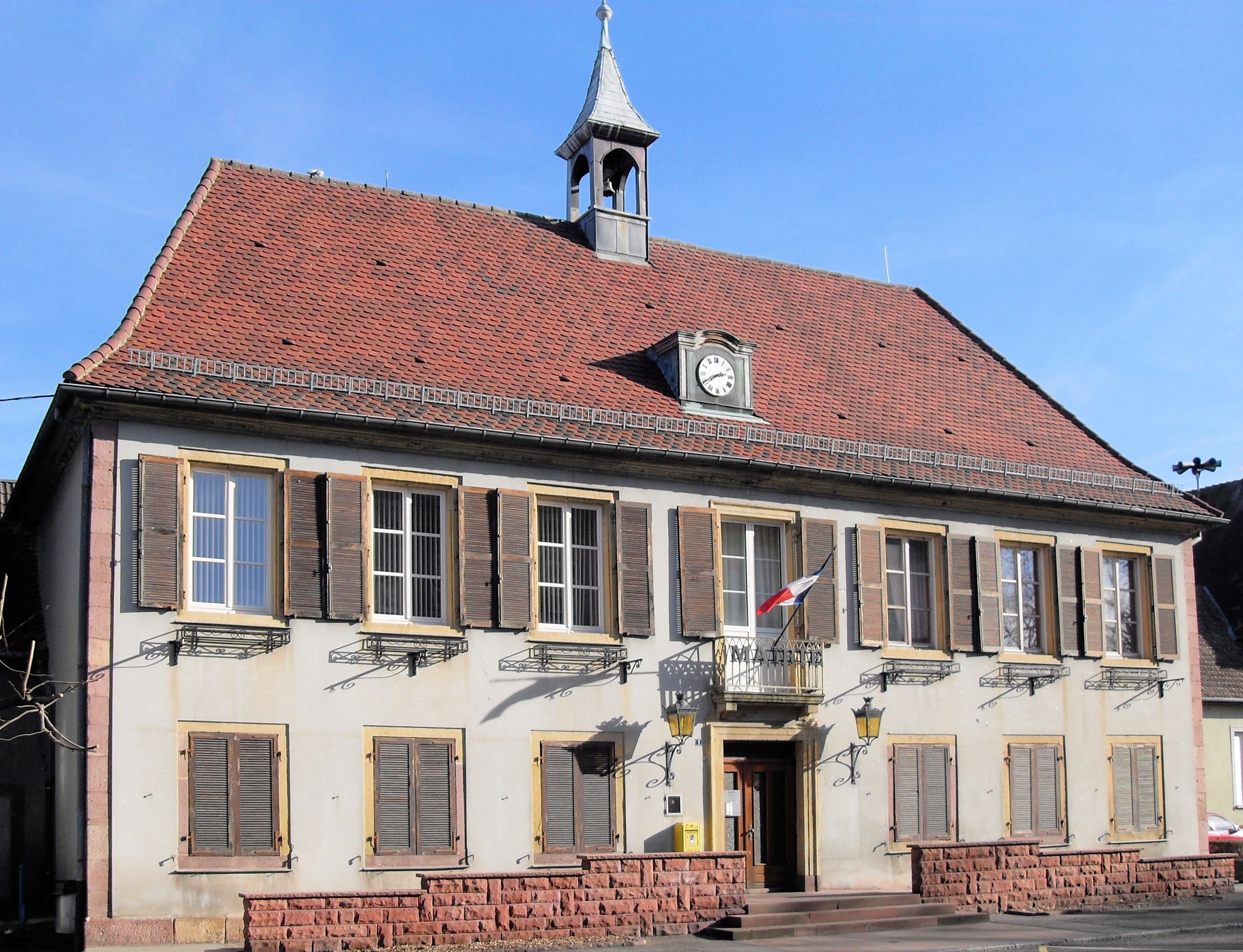
- The town hall in Issenheim

- Coat of arms
- Location of Issenheim
- Location within France Location within Grand Est
- Coordinates: 47°54′11″N 7°15′17″E
- Country: France
- Region: Grand Est
- Department: Haut-Rhin
- Arrondissement: Thann-Guebwiller
- Canton: Guebwiller
- Intercommunality: Région de Guebwiller

Government
  - Mayor (2020–2026): Marc Jung
- Area^{1}: 8.18 km^{2} (3.16 sq mi)
- Highest elevation: 268 m (879 ft)
- Lowest elevation: 223 m (732 ft)
- Population (2023): 3,502
  - Density: 428/km^{2} (1,110/sq mi)
- Time zone: UTC+01:00 (CET)
  - Summer (DST): UTC+02:00 (CEST)
- INSEE/Postal code: 68156 /68500
- ^{1} French Land Register data, which excludes lakes, ponds, glaciers > 1 km^{2} (0.386 sq mi or 247 acres) and river estuaries.

Issenheim (French pronunciation: [isənaim]; German: Isenheim) is a commune in the Haut-Rhin department in Grand Est in north-eastern France.

The Isenheim Altarpiece, currently on display at the Unterlinden Museum of Colmar, was completed in 1515 by Matthias Grünewald for the Antonines monastery in Issenheim.

Among his many other titles, Prince Albert II of Monaco is ceremonially styled as "Seigneur of Issenheim".

== Population ==
Historical population
Year	Pop.	±% p.a.
1968	1,945	—
1975	2,237	+2.02%
1982	2,852	+3.53%
1990	2,836	−0.07%
1999	3,296	+1.68%
2007	3,418	+0.46%
2012	3,485	+0.39%
2017	3,416	−0.40%
2023	3,502	+0.42%
Source: INSEE

== See also ==
- Communes of the Haut-Rhin département
