= Hartmannswiller =

Commune in Grand Est, France

- Commune
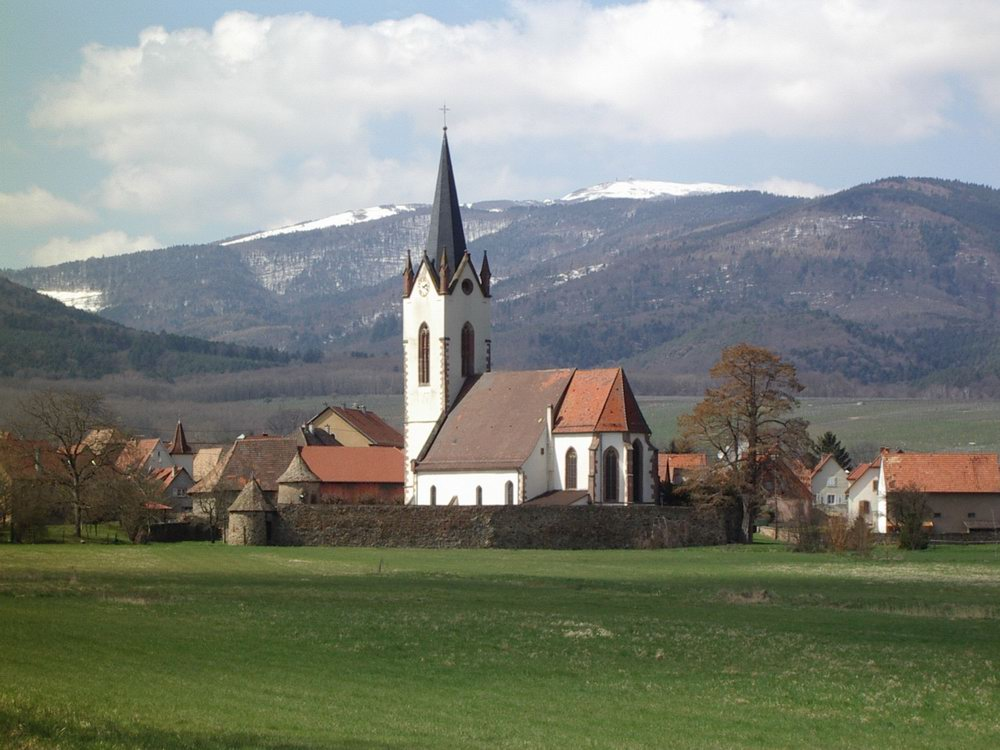
- The church in Hartmannswiller

- Coat of arms
- Location of Hartmannswiller
- Location within France Location within Grand Est
- Coordinates: 47°51′46″N 7°12′59″E
- Country: France
- Region: Grand Est
- Department: Haut-Rhin
- Arrondissement: Thann-Guebwiller
- Canton: Guebwiller
- Intercommunality: Région de Guebwiller

Government
  - Mayor (2020–2026): François Wurtz
- Area^{1}: 4.78 km^{2} (1.85 sq mi)
- Elevation: 255 m (837 ft)
- Highest elevation: 944 m (3,097 ft)
- Lowest elevation: 244 m (801 ft)
- Population (2023): 654
  - Density: 137/km^{2} (354/sq mi)
- Time zone: UTC+01:00 (CET)
  - Summer (DST): UTC+02:00 (CEST)
- INSEE/Postal code: 68122 /68500
- ^{1} French Land Register data, which excludes lakes, ponds, glaciers > 1 km^{2} (0.386 sq mi or 247 acres) and river estuaries.

Hartmannswiller (French pronunciation: [aʁtmansvilɛʁ]; German: Hartmannsweiler) is a commune in the Haut-Rhin department in Alsace in north-eastern France.

It is situated between vineyards and orchards, at the foot of Hartmannswillerkopf (Vieil Armand). It is 6 km from Guebwiller, 14 km from Thann and 20 km from Mulhouse.

== See also ==
- Communes of the Haut-Rhin département
