= Soultz-Haut-Rhin Railway =

Coordinates: 47.86605°N 7.20203°E

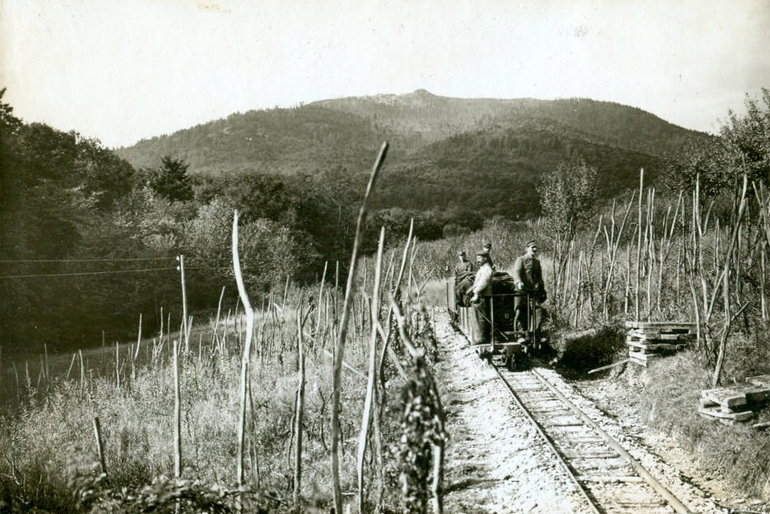
- Sulzerbahn with the Hartmannswillerkopf in the background

Technical
- Line length: 9.8 km (6.1 mi)
- Track gauge: 600 mm (1 ft 11 5/8 in)

The Soultz-Haut-Rhin Railway (German Sulzerbahn) was a 9.8 km (6.1 mi) long military light railway with a track gauge of 600 mm (1 ft 11 5/8 in) that the Germans built and operated during World War I from Soultz-Haut-Rhin to the Niederwald terminus below the Hartmannswillerkopf near Wattwiller in Alsace.

== Route ==
The route began in Soultz and ran on the Rue de la Marne, the Promenade de la Citadelle and the Rue du Sudel. It crossed the Wuenheimerbach east of Wuenheim on a stone bridge and then ran to the southwest and west of Château d’Ollwiller to the Gaede station, the lower station of a cable car, and the Waldfrieden, Alm and Niederwald stations.

Another narrow gauge railway ran from Sproesser station to Schlummerklippe, which was operated by hand or horses.

== Operation ==
Normally, 10 to 15 trains ran per day, being hauled by two Deutz benzene locomotives.
