= Église Saint-Maurice, Soultz-les-Bains =

Coordinates: 48°34′17.04″N 7°29′09.76″E

Église Saint-Maurice
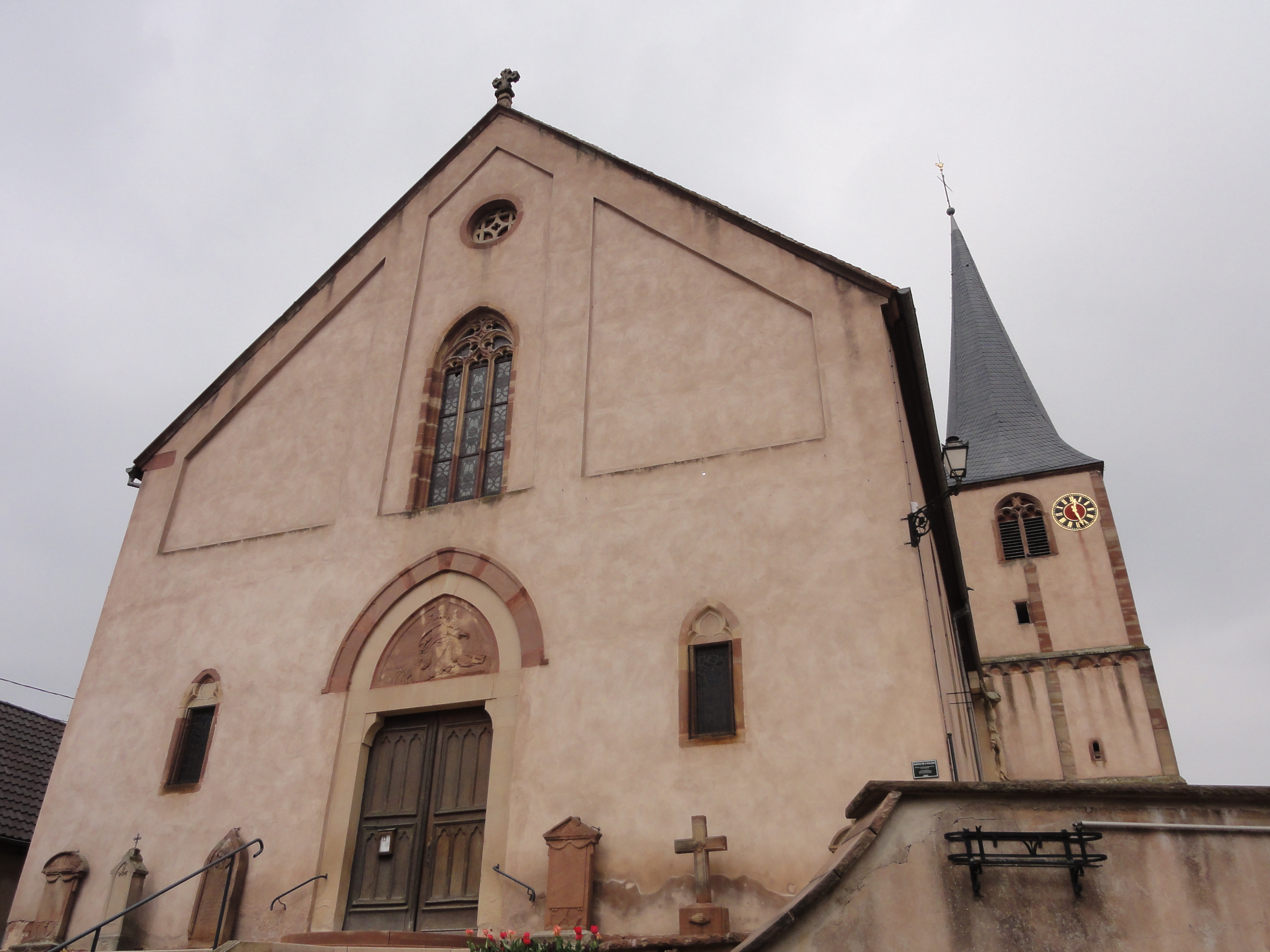
- Église Saint-Maurice
- Location: Soultz-les-Bains
- Country: France
- Denomination: Catholic

History
- Founded: 1165
- Dedication: Saint Maurice

Architecture
- Heritage designation: Monument historique
- Designated: 10 April 1996
- Style: Romanesque; Gothic; Gothic Revival
- Completed: 1848

Administration
- Archdiocese: Strasbourg
- Parish: Communauté de paroisses Sainte Edith Stein

Église Saint-Maurice (Church of Saint Maurice) is the parish church of the village of Soultz-les-Bains, in the Bas-Rhin department of France. It should not be confused with Église Saint-Maurice of Soultz-Haut-Rhin, in the neighbouring Haut-Rhin department.

The church is notable for its medieval tower and for being one of the earliest examples of Gothic Revival architecture in Alsace. It is classified as a Monument historique by the French Ministry of Culture since 1996.

The church was first mentioned in 1165. The basis of the tower is Romanesque (late 12th-century). It is decorated with reliefs on the outside and with frescos on the inside. The upper part of the tower is Gothic and dates from the end of the 15th century. The rest of the church was rebuilt according to plans (1843, 1844) by the architect Charles Morin (1810–1897), and inaugurated in 1848. In 1888, the nave was covered with a wooden barrel vault.

The pipe organ is a 1762 work by Johann Andreas Silbermann. It was moved into this church from Old Saint Peter's Church, Strasbourg, in 1865.

== Gallery ==
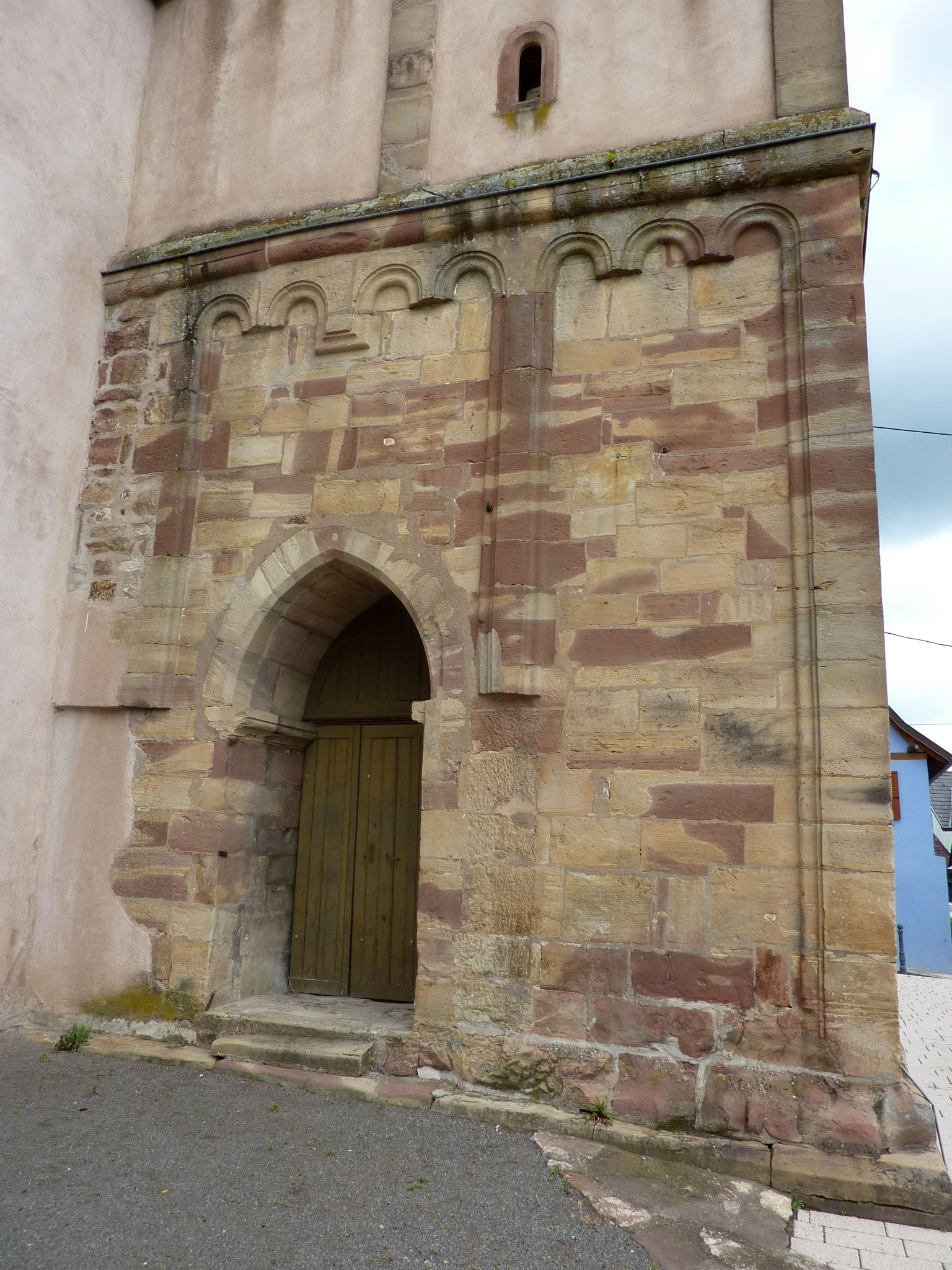
Romanesque part of the tower

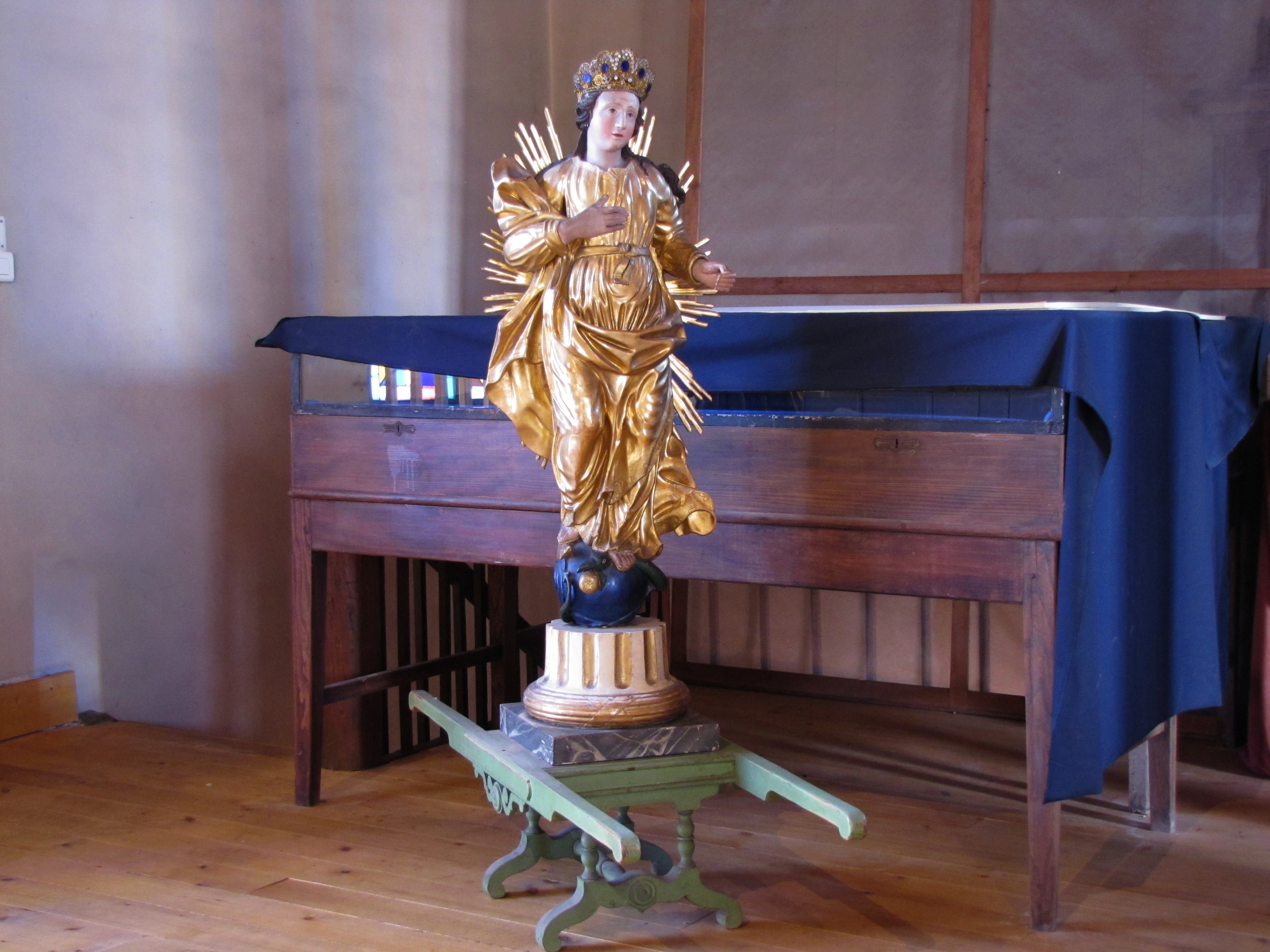
18th-century processional statue "Immaculate Heart of Mary"

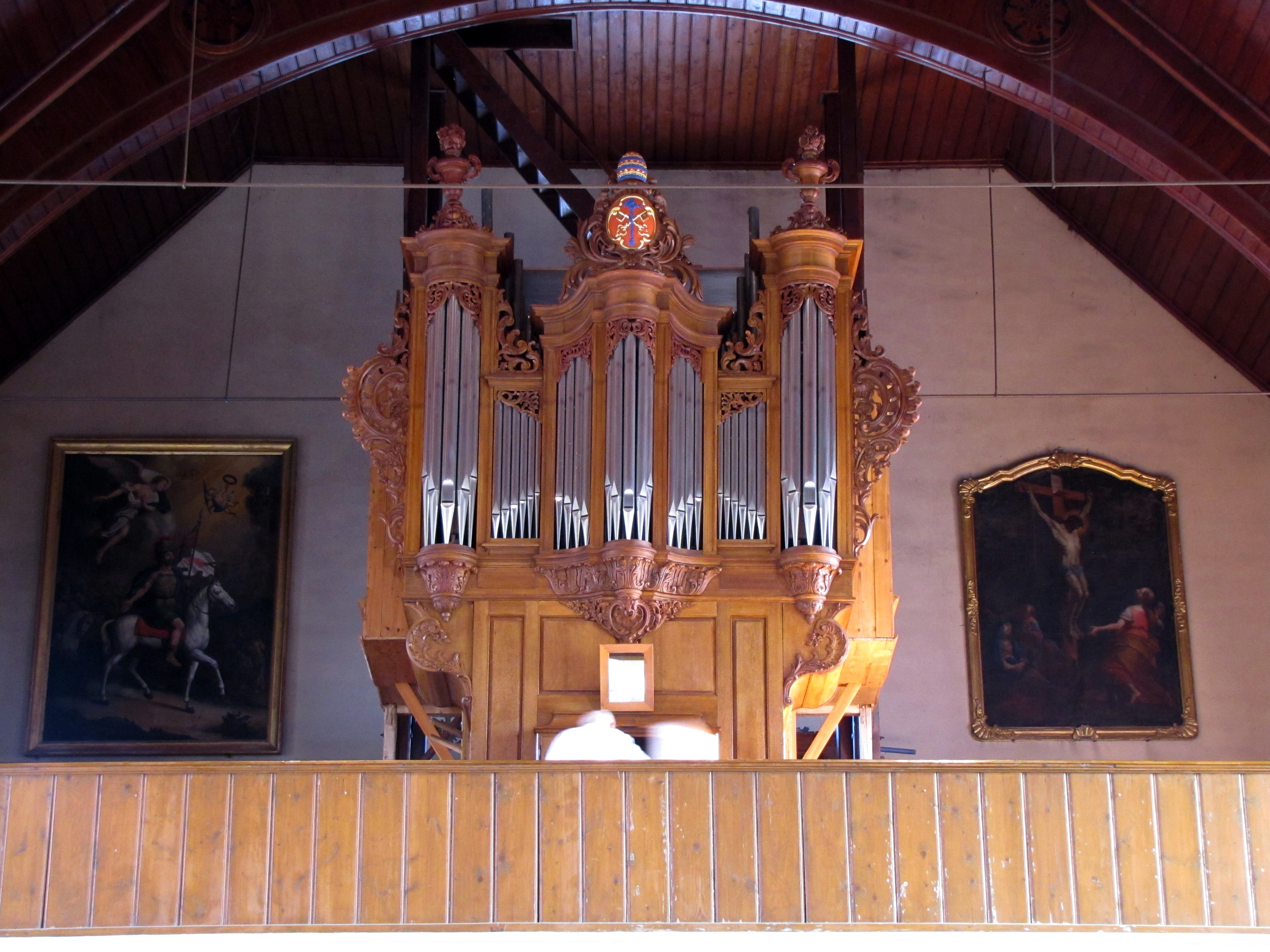
The pipe organ
