= Carmoly =

Carmoly is a surname. Notable people with the surname include:

- Eliakim Carmoly (1802–1875), French rabbi, grandson of Isaachar
- Isaachar Bär ben Judah Carmoly (1735–1781), French rabbi
