= Issachar Bär ben Judah Carmoly =

Personal life
- Born: 15 September 1735 Ribeauvillé, Alsace, France
- Died: May 1781 Sulz, Alsace, France

Religious life
- Religion: Judaism

Issachar Bär ben Judah Carmoly (15 September 1735 – May 1781) was an Alsatian rabbi.

== Biography ==
At the age of 10, he was sufficiently advanced in his training for the rabbinate to follow the elaborate lectures of Jonathan Eybeschütz. Later, Carmoly studied successively at Frankfurt, under the direction of Jacob Joshua Falk (author of Pene Yehoshu'a), and at Metz, under Samuel Helman, who conferred upon him the title of rabbi. On returning home, in compliance with the wish of his father, Carmoly began the study of medicine under the direction of Jacob Assur, a physician of Nancy, but had to give it up, being engrossed with his Talmudical studies. The only benefit he derived from his tutor was a fair knowledge of mathematics, of which he made use later.

Carmoly married the daughter of a rich banker named Joseph Raineau. The latter persuaded the bishop of Sulz to create a rabbinate in his see; and Carmoly was appointed rabbi of Sulz.

Carmoly was the author of a commentary on the Tosefta to the treatise Betzah, published, together with the text, under the title Yam Yissakhar (Sea of Issachar; Metz, 1769). The grandson of the author, Eliakim Carmoly, claimed to have had in his possession the following manuscripts of his grandfather:

- Yam Yissakhar, a commentary on the Tosefta on the treatise Makkot
- Keter Torah (The Crown of the Law), a poem containing the names of all the books of the Holy Scripture, the Mishnah, and the Talmud ("This poem," says Eliakim Carmoly, "is still recited in the district of Sulz on the eve of the Feast of the Law" (Simchat Torah).)
- Ha-Talmudi ha-Melummad (The Learned Talmudist), a collection of Halaka, Aggadah, and commentaries
- Matteh Yissakhar (The Staff of Issachar), halakhic decisions
- Sefer Yad haIttim (Book of the Hand of the Times), a treatise on the Hebrew calendar
- Benei Yisrael (The Children of Israel), novellæ on many Talmudical treatises
- Ohel Yissakhar (The Tent of Issachar), a treatise on mathematics
- Karmi Sheli (Mine Own Vineyard), novellæ on the Pentateuch, literary essays, poems, etc.
