= Château de Buchenek =

Castle in France

Coordinates: 47°53′10″N 7°13′47″E

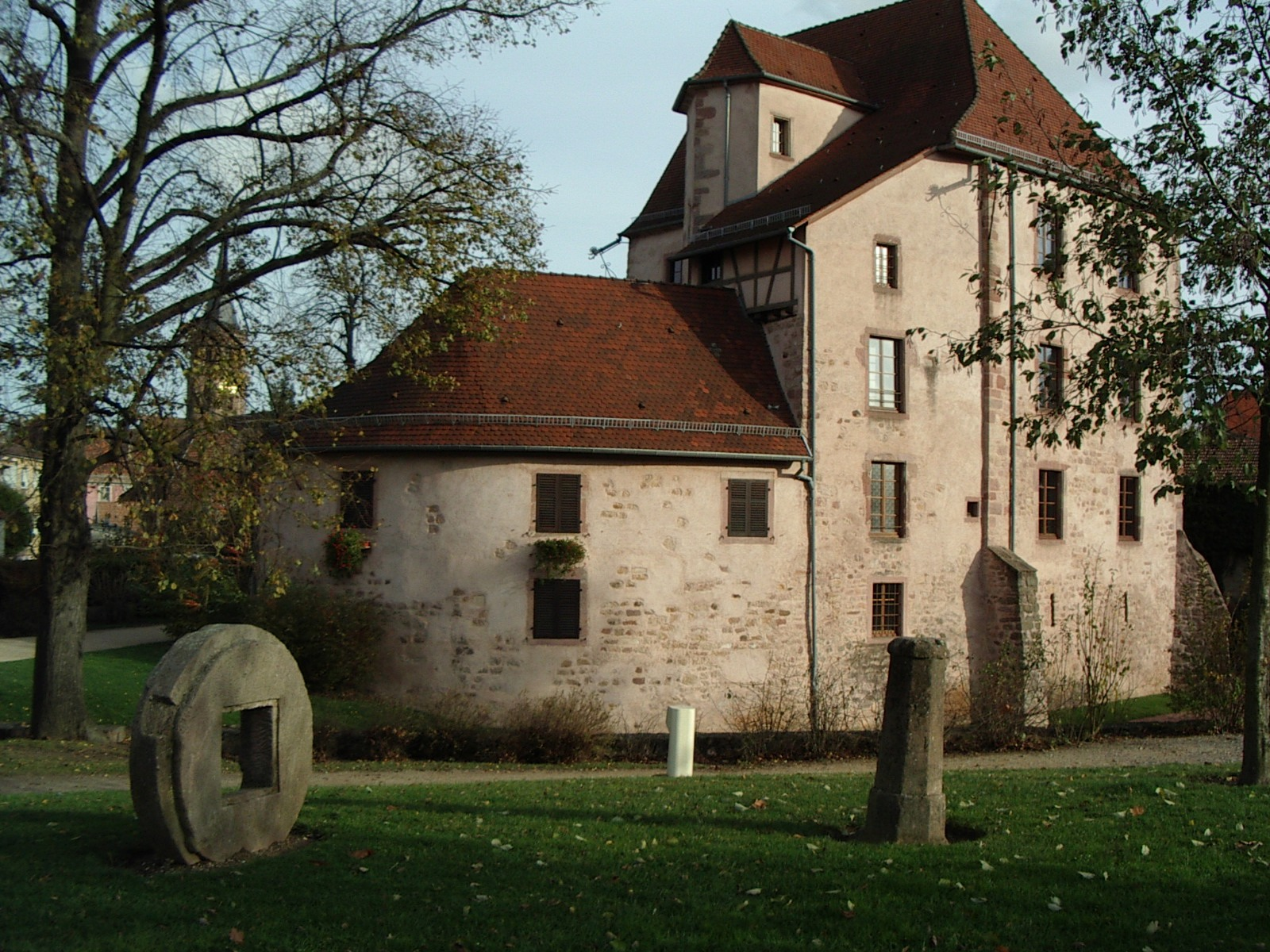
Château de Buchenek

The Château de Buchenek is a castle in the commune of Soultz-Haut-Rhin in the Haut-Rhin département of France. Dating from the second half of the 13th century, it was altered, possibly in the 14th century, and in the 16th century.

The castle was first recorded in 1251. The logis, of a rectangular plan, possibly still dates from this period at the lower level; it was altered in the 14th century (there is evidence of building work) as well as in the second half of the 16th century (staircase tower). Restored after the Thirty Years' War, the castle was sold as national property. In the 19th century it was used as a factory. Bought by the town in 1976, the castle has had a significant restoration and, since 1990, has housed the municipal museum.

It has been listed since 1984 as a monument historique by the French Ministry of Culture.

== See also ==
- List of castles in France
