= Isaac Chelo =

Rabbi in the 14th century

Isaac Chelo (also Hilo, Hilu or Khelo), in Hebrew יצחק חילו, was a rabbi of the 14th century. His place of residence is unclear. Eliakim Carmoly, in his French supposed translation of Chelo's itinerary, wrote "Laresa du royaume d'Aragon", which Gershom Scholem interpreted as an erroneous spelling of Lerida. However, Dan Shapira took it to mean Larissa in Thessaly. Chelo is famous for an itinerary of the Holy Land first published in 1847, though many believe it to have been forged by Carmoly.

== Chelo's Itinerary ==
In 1847, the controversial French scholar Eliakim Carmoly published an account titled Les chemins de Jérusalem (The Roads from Jerusalem, שבילי דירושלם in Hebrew), purporting to be Chelo's description of Jerusalem and seven roads leading from it, written in 1333. An English translation was published by Elkan Adler in 1930.

Carmoly wrote that the original Hebrew manuscript was in his own library, but when his library was catalogued after his death, no such manuscript was found.

Scholem examined the library in 1925 and found nine lines of an 18th-century copy of the itinerary. He charged that the itinerary had a number of anachronisms, contradictions, and quotations from Kabbalistic works postdating Chelo. On this basis, Scholem judged the itinerary to be a forgery, written or greatly expanded by Carmoly himself. This assessment has been accepted by Michael Ish-Shalom, Dan Shapira, Joshua Prawer and Yoel Elitzur.

Prawer also alleged that there was no Jewish community in Hebron at the time the Itinerary claimed to describe one. Prawer wrote that "This itinerary is unfortunately still being quoted by unwary scholars, even though the forgery was proved almost 50 years ago."

Michael Ehrlich, on the other hand, argued against Scholem and Ish-Shalom that most of the itinerary was likely authentic, as much of the historical and geographical information presented therein appears correct, and there are multiple pieces of information that aren't likely to have been included by a mid-19th-century forger.
