= Johann Andreas Silbermann =

Organ builder from Strasbourg (1712–1783)

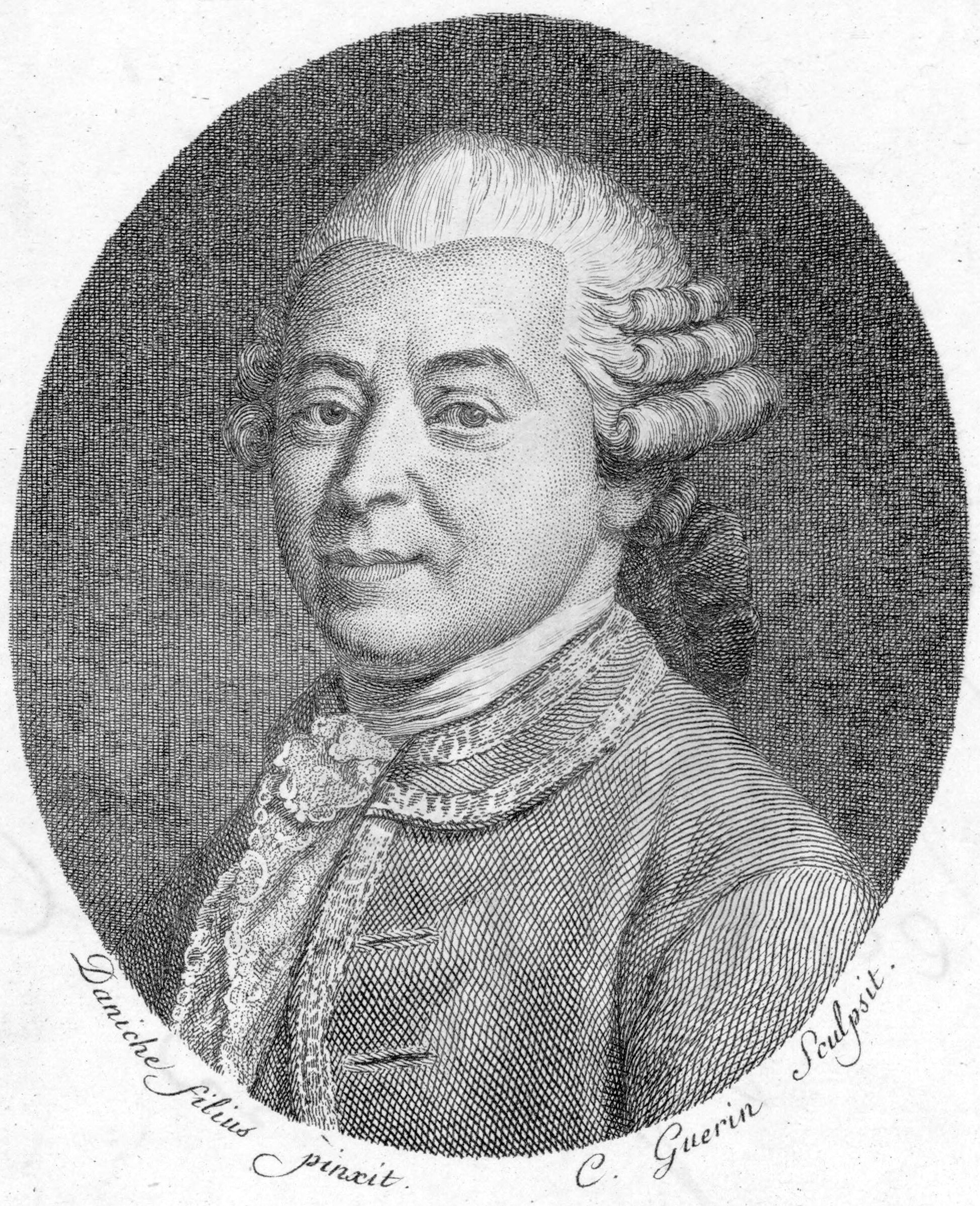
Johann Andreas Silbermann

Johann Andreas Silbermann, also known as Jean-André Silbermann (26 June 1712, in Strasbourg – 11 February 1783, in Strasbourg) was an 18th-century organ-builder, as were his father Andreas Silbermann and his paternal uncle Gottfried Silbermann.

Mozart met with Silbermann during his (Mozart's) stay in Strasbourg in 1778, and played on the pipe organs in the two Lutheran churches Saint-Thomas (preserved), and Temple Neuf (destroyed in 1870), which he called ″Silbermann's best".

Pipe organs by J. A. Silbermann in their original instrumental state can be found in the following churches, among others:

- St Georges, Châtenois
- Jesuit Church, Molsheim
- St Maurice, Soultz-Haut-Rhin
- St Maurice, Soultz-les Bains
- St Thomas, Strasbourg
