= Église Saint-Maurice, Soultz-Haut-Rhin =

Coordinates: 47°53′13″N 7°13′48″E

Église Saint-Maurice
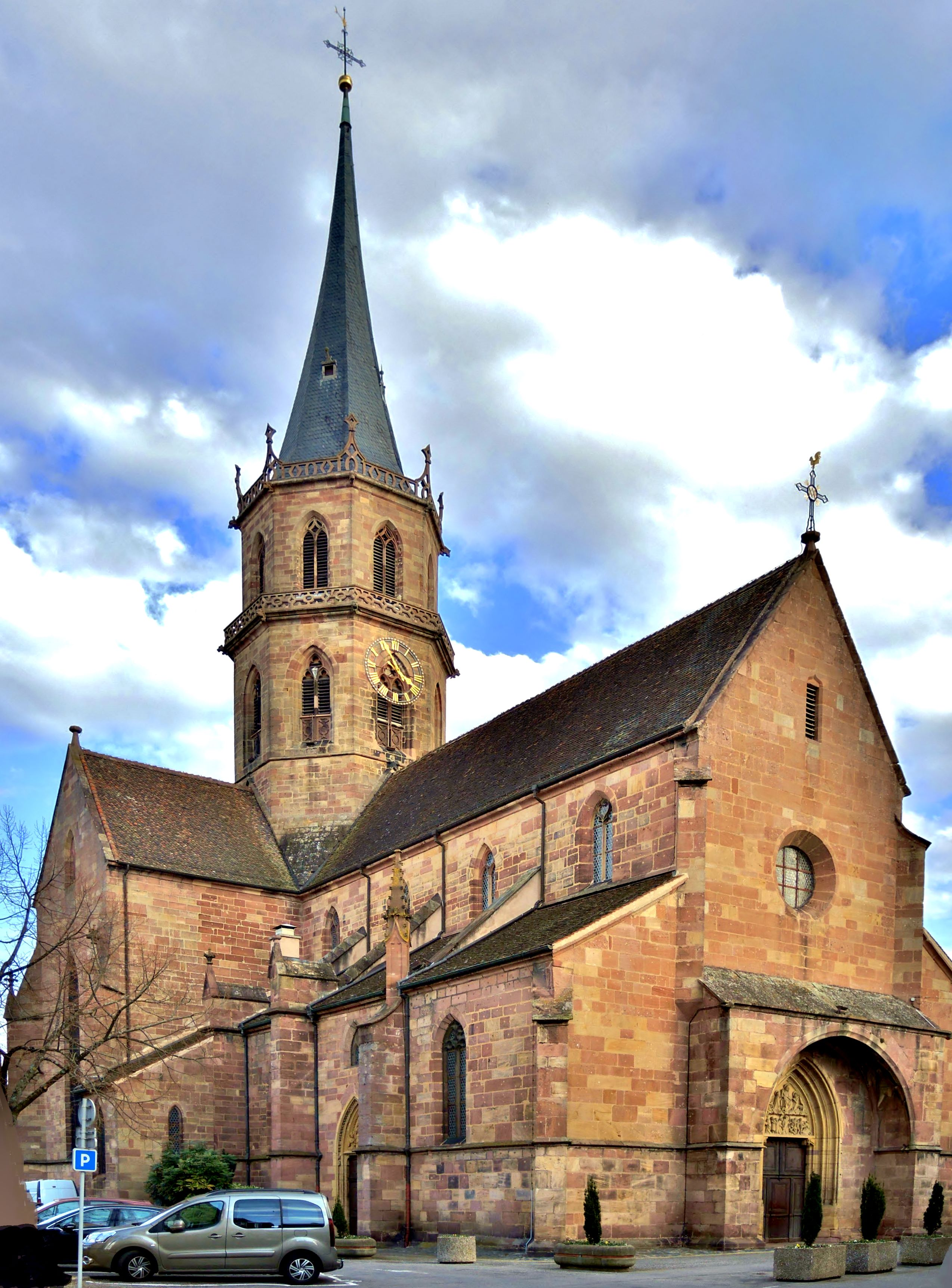
- Église Saint-Maurice
- Location: Soultz-Haut-Rhin
- Country: France
- Denomination: Catholic
- Website: http://www.eglise-de-soultz68.fr/

History
- Dedication: Saint Maurice

Architecture
- Heritage designation: Monument historique
- Designated: 12 August 1920
- Style: Gothic
- Groundbreaking: 1270
- Completed: 1489

Administration
- Archdiocese: Archdiocese of Strasbourg
- Parish: Communauté de paroisses de Saint Georges au pied du Vieil Armand

Église Saint-Maurice (Church of Saint Maurice) is the medieval parish church of the small town of Soultz, in the Haut-Rhin department of France.

The church is noteworthy for its refined and light (épuré et léger) Gothic design, and for the works of art it contains, including a Renaissance pulpit and a 1750 Silbermann pipe organ. It has been classified as a monument historique by the French Ministry of Culture since 1920.

== History ==
The work on the church was begun in 1270, at the site of a previous Romanesque church from the 11th century, of which some remains have been uncovered by 1990s archaeologists. The transept was finished before 1310 and the nave around 1340, but the overall construction was only completed in 1489 with the addition of a bay at the western end, because the church had been found too small for the town's population at that time. The top of the spire was added in 1611.

== Description ==
The height of the crossing tower is 66 metres (217 feet), including the sun-shaped weather vane on top of the cross. The tower features a clock face with hands, a painted sundial (1755), and a scratch dial. Inside, the height of the vaults at the transept is 17.30 m (56 ft 9 in). The church's floor plan is in the shape of a Latin cross, with a central nave and two aisles.

The church lost much of its original furniture during the French Revolution. Today, it contains 14th- and 15th-century frescos (heavily restored in the 1970s and 1980s); an elaborate wooden pulpit from around 1616; a well preserved 1750 pipe organ by Johann Andreas Silbermann in a lavish case; and many ledger stones, altars, statues, bosses, and other sculptures. Most noteworthy among these are a wooden relief from around 1480–1490, depicting Saint George and the Dragon, a wooden statue from around 1500 of the Madonna and Child, and an 1855 oil on canvas painting of the Entombment of Christ that was presented to the church by Napoleon III in 1864.

On the outside, the southern portal has retained its tympanum from around 1320, representing Saint Maurice on horseback and the Adoration of the Magi. This sculpture may be a work of Thann masters from nearby.

== Gallery ==
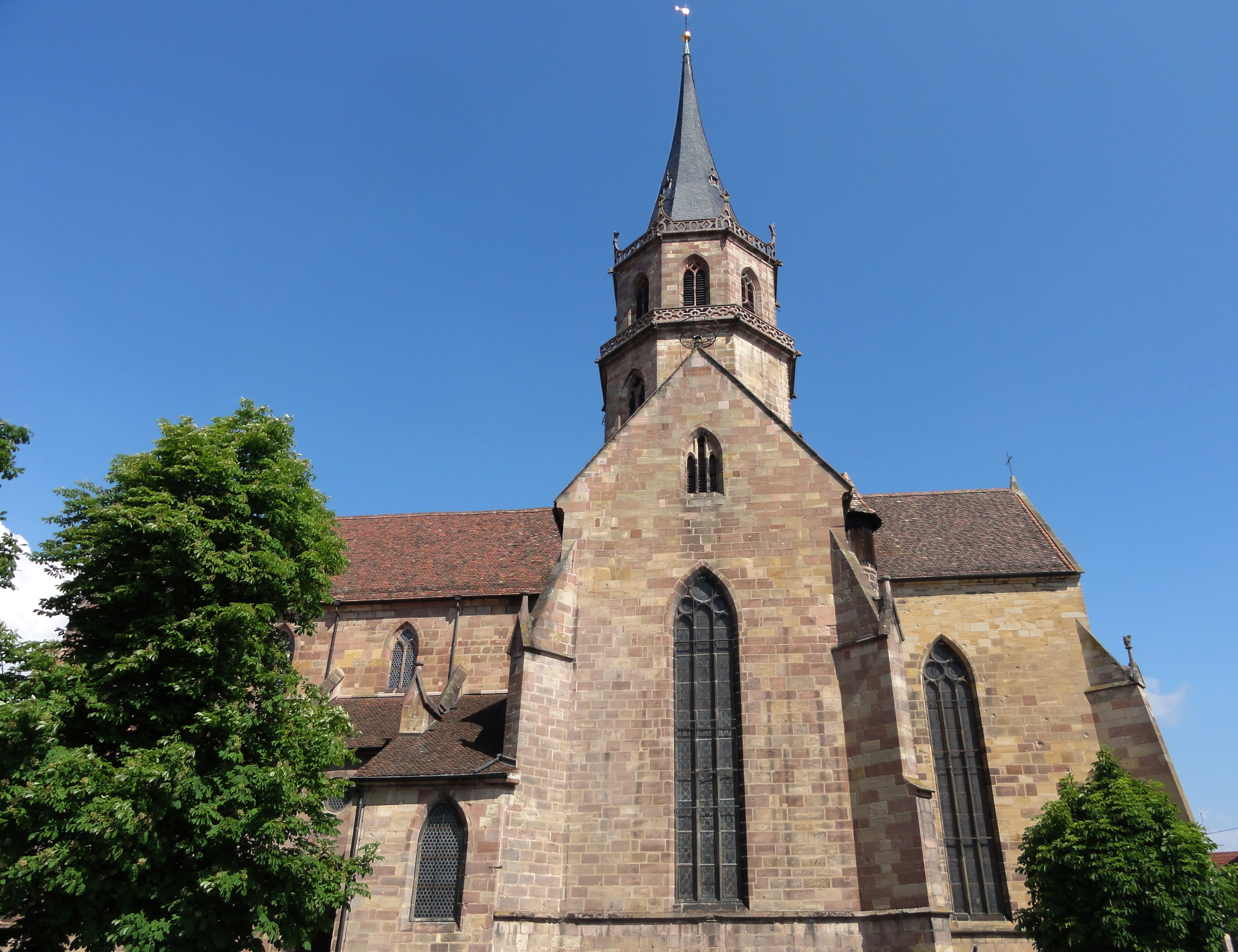
Lateral view

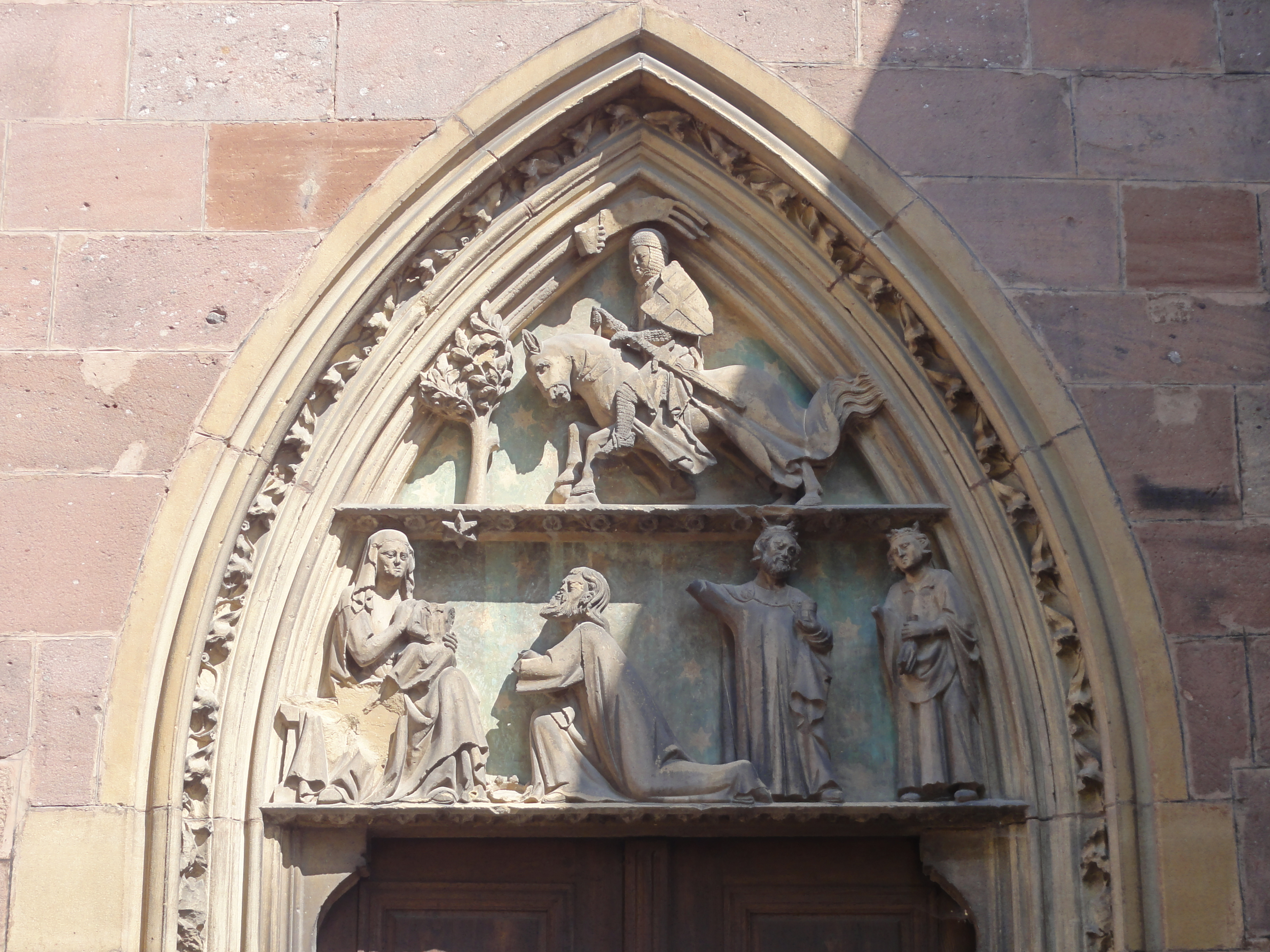
14th-century tympanum: Saint Maurice on horseback, and the Adoration of the Magi

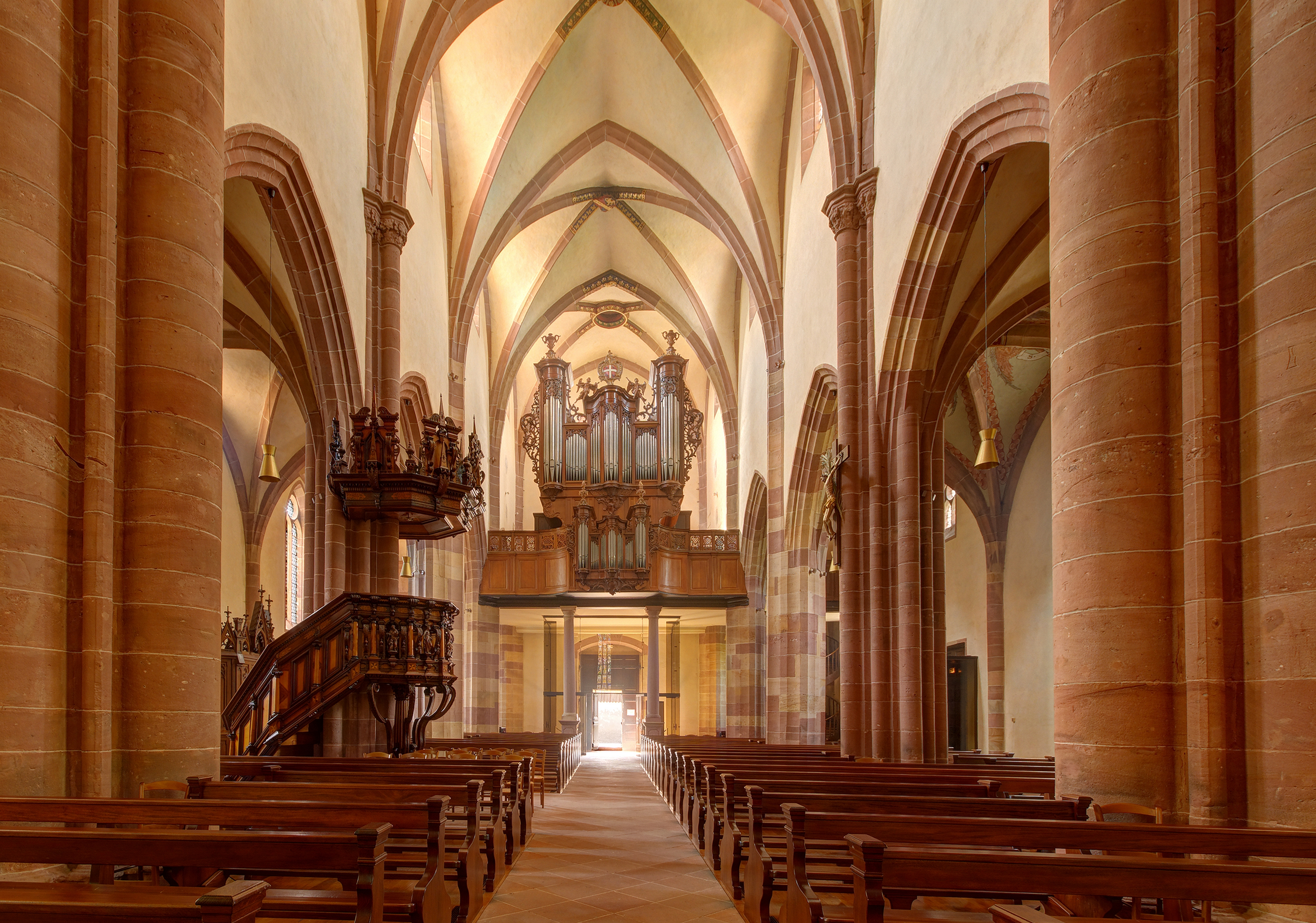
The nave, looking west

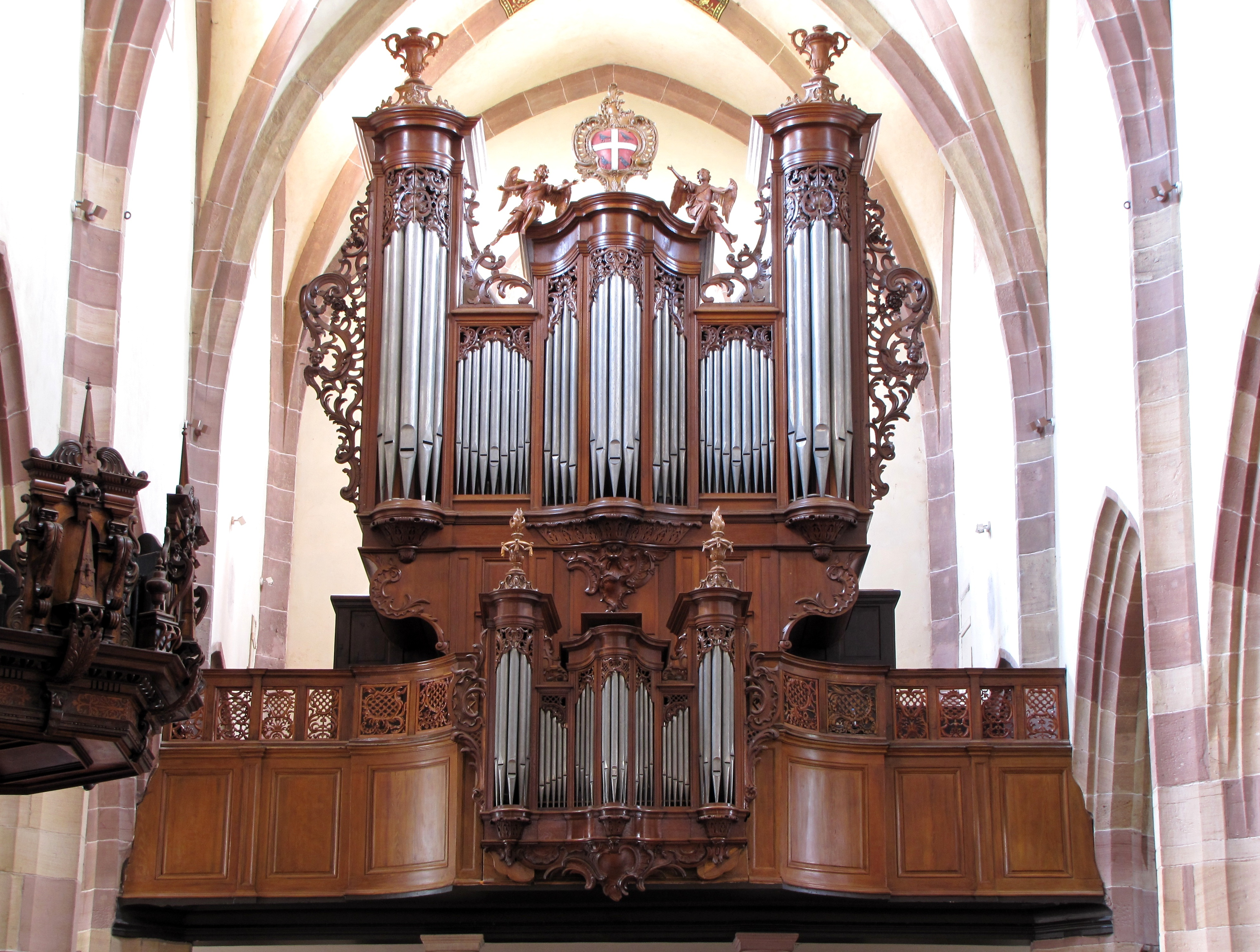
The pipe organ

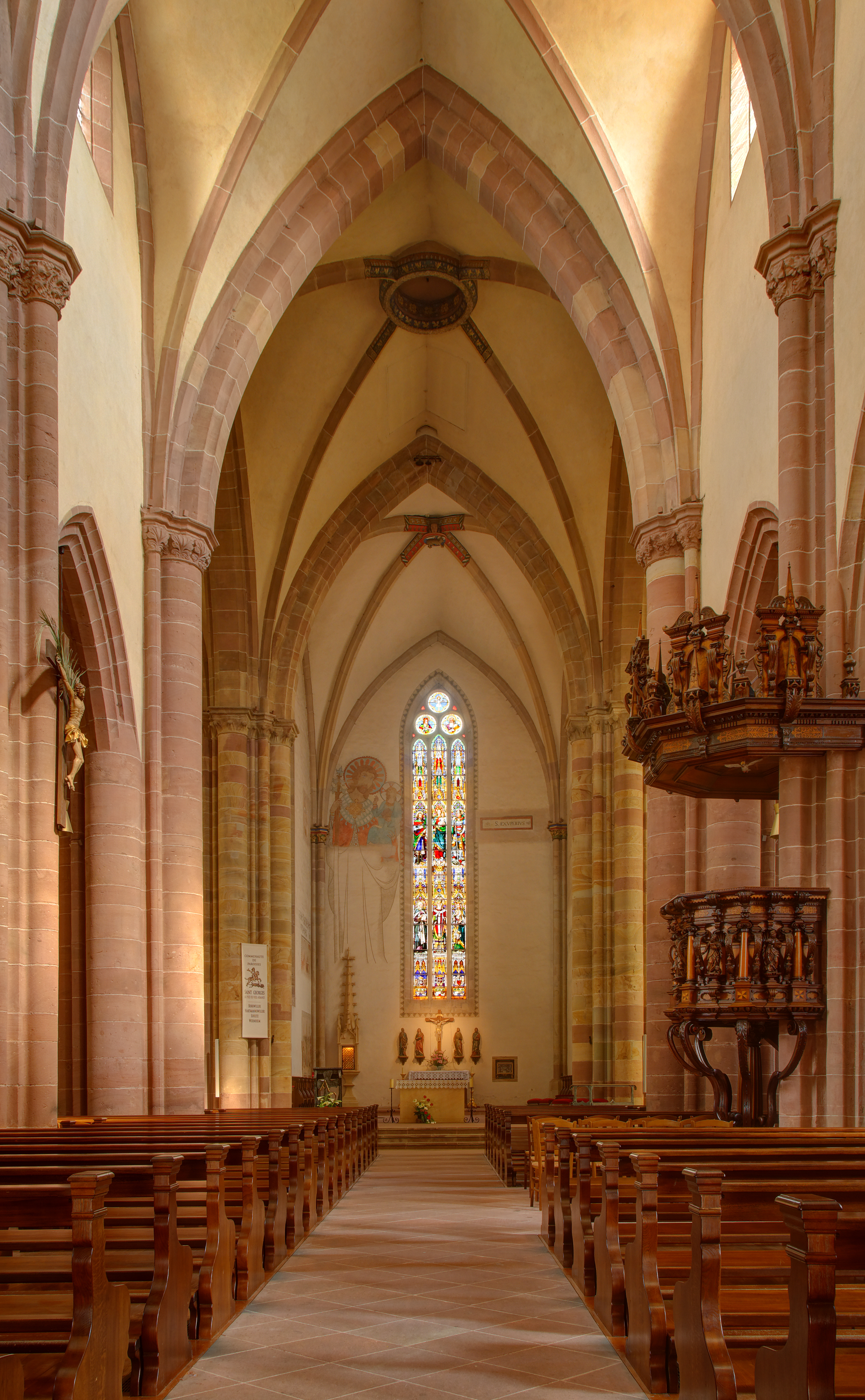
The nave, looking east

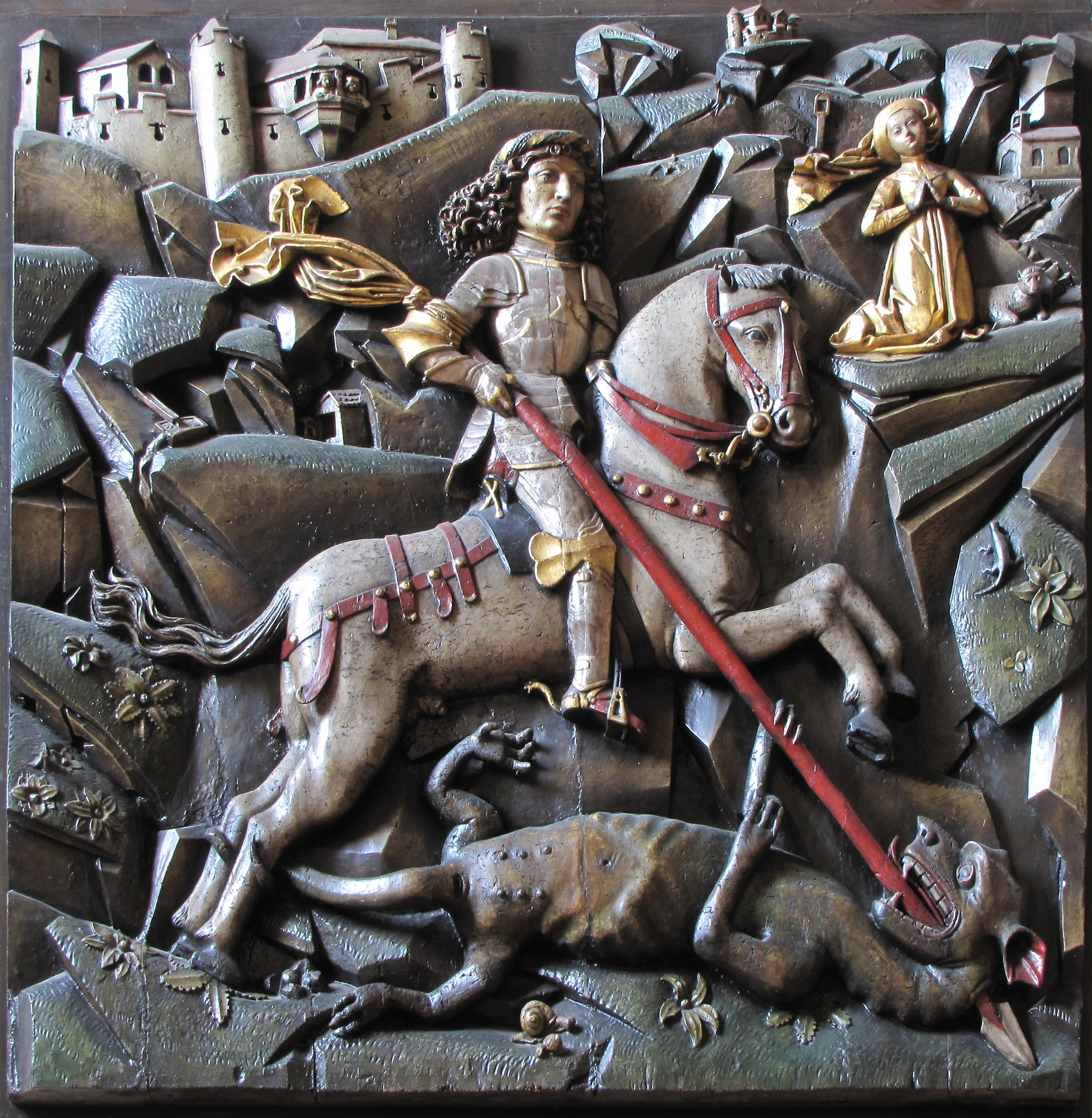
15th-century Gothic relief: Saint George and the Dragon

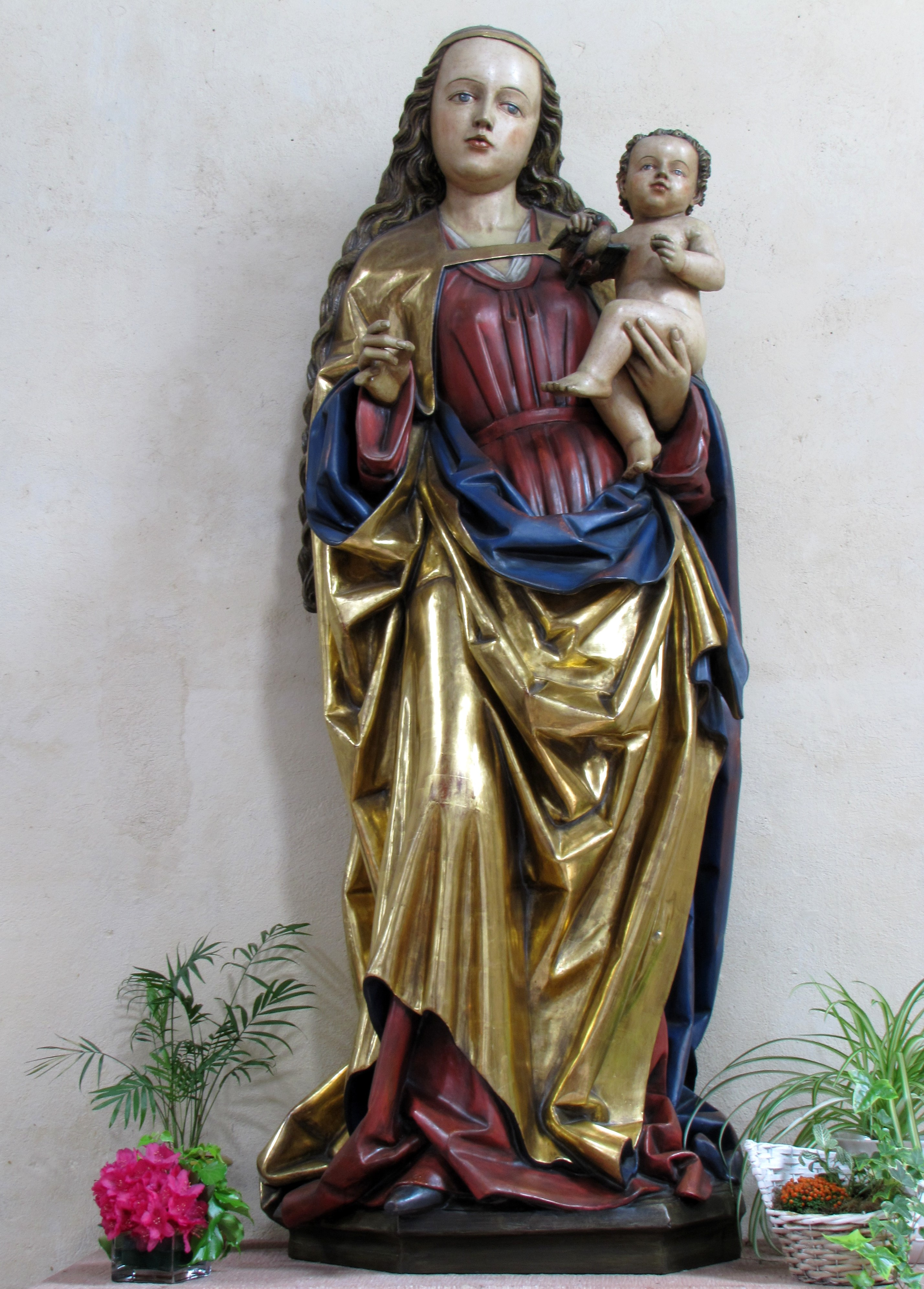
Ca. 1500 Gothic statue: Madonna and Child

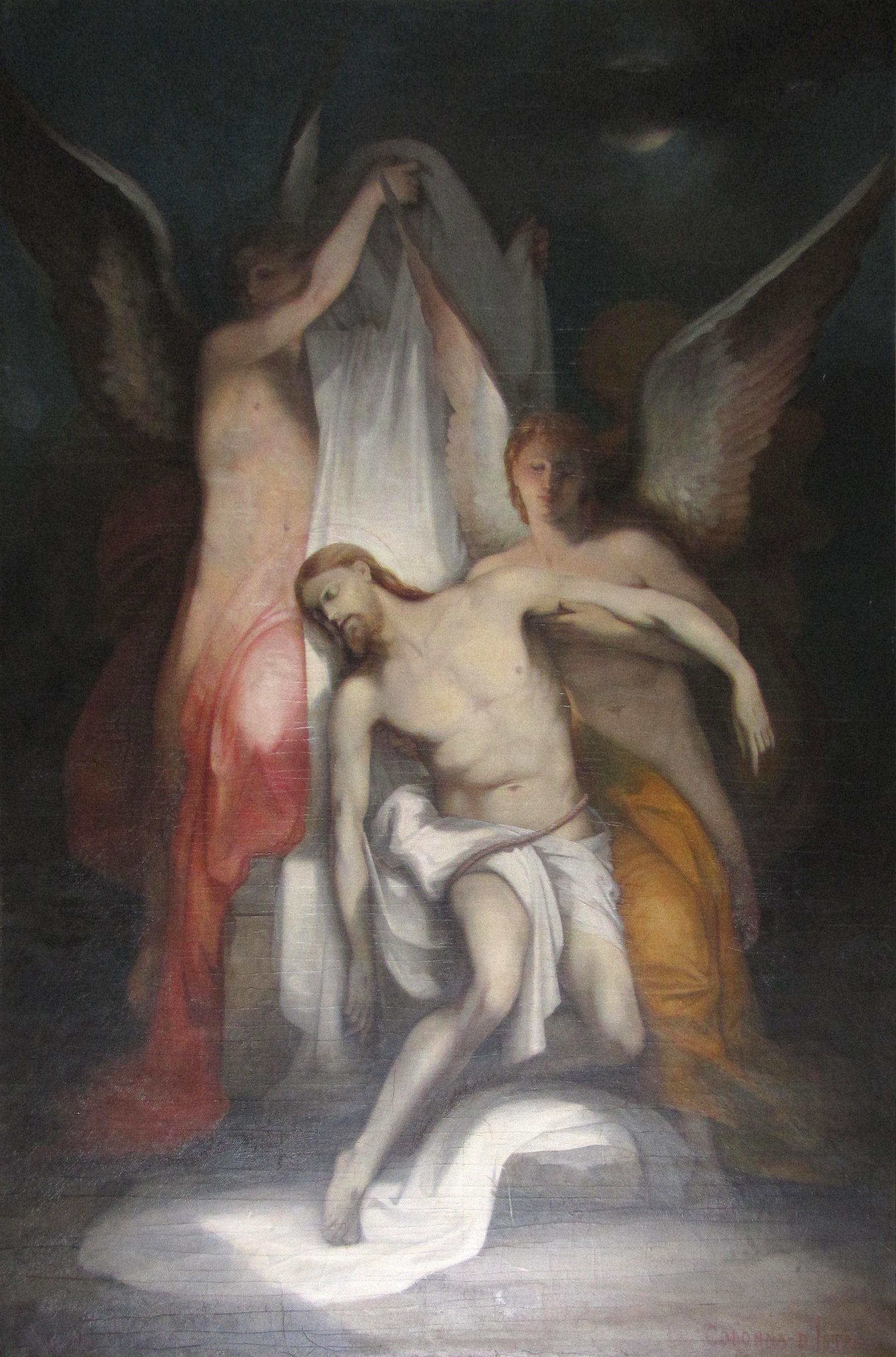
1855 painting, presented by Napoleon III in 1864: Entombment of Christ
