= Soultz-Haut-Rhin =

Commune in Grand Est, France

- Commune
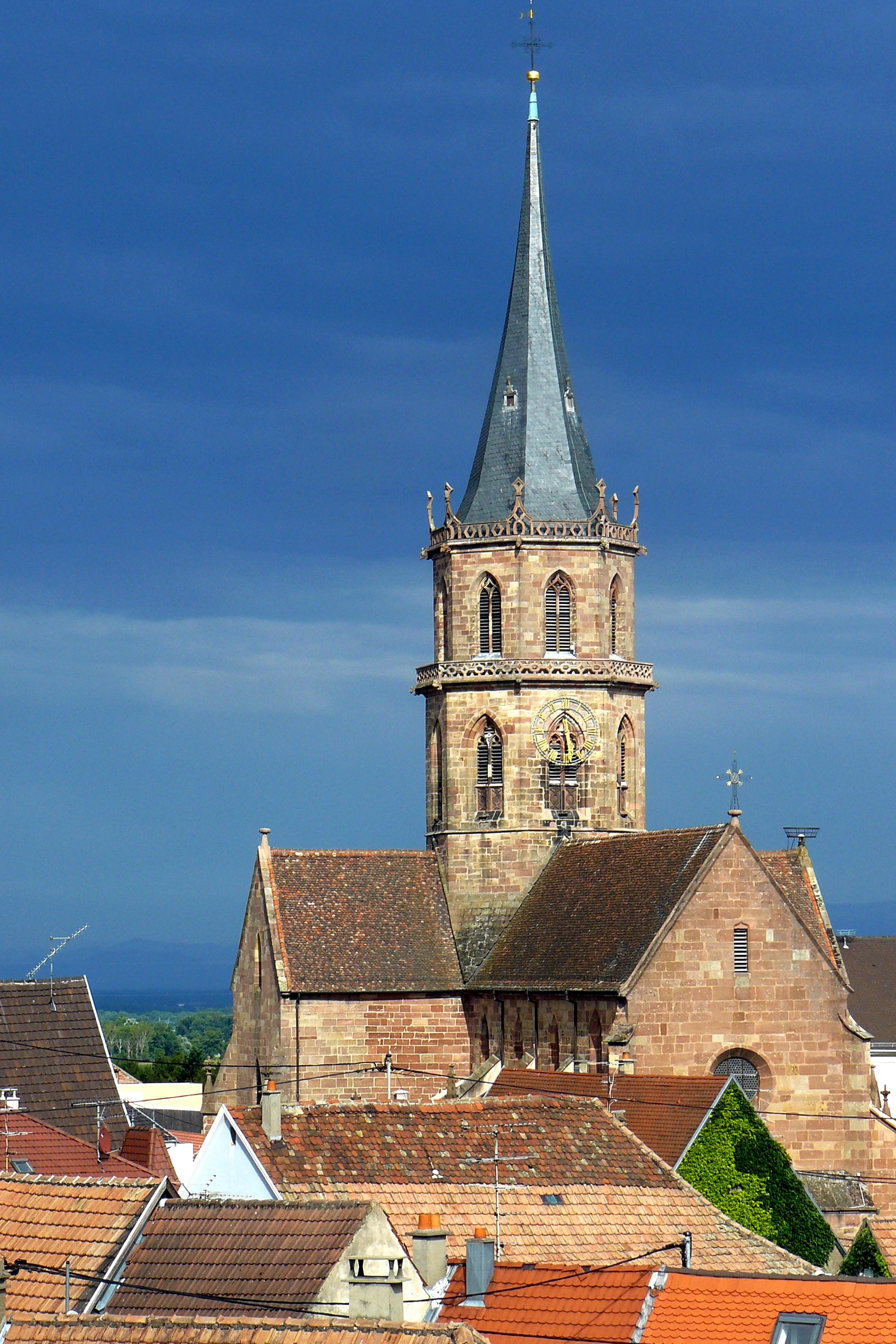
- Église Saint-Maurice

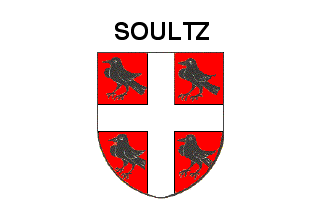
- Flag Coat of arms
- Location of Soultz-Haut-Rhin
- Location within France Location within Grand Est
- Coordinates: 47°53′10″N 7°13′47″E
- Country: France
- Region: Grand Est
- Department: Haut-Rhin
- Arrondissement: Thann-Guebwiller
- Canton: Guebwiller
- Intercommunality: Région de Guebwiller

Government
  - Mayor (2020–2026): Marcello Rotolo
- Area^{1}: 29.56 km^{2} (11.41 sq mi)
- Elevation: 270 m (890 ft)
- Highest elevation: 1,421 m (4,662 ft)
- Lowest elevation: 239 m (784 ft)
- Population (2023): 7,012
  - Density: 237.2/km^{2} (614.4/sq mi)
- Time zone: UTC+01:00 (CET)
  - Summer (DST): UTC+02:00 (CEST)
- INSEE/Postal code: 68315 /68360
- Website: www.ville-soultz.fr
- ^{1} French Land Register data, which excludes lakes, ponds, glaciers > 1 km^{2} (0.386 sq mi or 247 acres) and river estuaries.

Soultz-Haut-Rhin (French pronunciation: [sults o ʁɛ̃]; German: Sulz/Oberelsaß) is a commune in the Haut-Rhin département in Grand Est in north-eastern France.

Its inhabitants are called Soultziens (male) or Soultziennes (female).

== Geography ==
The town of Soultz-Haut-Rhin has an enclave located northeast of Goldbach-Altenbach.

The town of Soultz was built around a salted water source from which originates its name.

== History ==
The origins of Soultz go back to the 7th century.

667 : the written name of Sulza (salted source) is mentioned in a donation from Adalrich, Duke of Alsace, father of Saint Odile, of the bann of Soultz to the convent of Ebersmunster.

The Soultz Railway was a 9.8 km (6.1 mi) long military light railway with a track gauge of 600 mm (1 ft 11 5/8 in) that the Germans built and operated during World War I from Soultz to the Niederwald terminus below the Hartmannswillerkopf near Wattwiller.

== Demography ==
Historical population

Year	Pop.	±% p.a.
1793	3,524	—
1800	3,945	+1.63%
1806	4,579	+2.51%
1821	5,252	+0.92%
1831	4,016	−2.65%
1836	4,152	+0.67%
1841	3,432	−3.74%
1846	3,575	+0.82%
1851	3,660	+0.47%
1856	3,996	+1.77%
1861	3,989	−0.04%
1866	4,635	+3.05%
1871	4,999	+1.52%
1875	5,518	+2.50%
1880	4,630	−3.45%
1885	4,511	−0.52%
1890	4,436	−0.33%
1895	4,444	+0.04%
1900	4,514	+0.31%

Year	Pop.	±% p.a.
1905	4,704	+0.83%
1910	4,852	+0.62%
1921	4,383	−0.92%
1926	4,583	+0.90%
1931	4,567	−0.07%
1936	4,241	−1.47%
1946	4,091	−0.36%
1954	4,120	+0.09%
1962	4,750	+1.79%
1968	4,910	+0.55%
1975	5,689	+2.13%
1982	5,696	+0.02%
1990	5,867	+0.37%
1999	6,640	+1.38%
2007	7,131	+0.90%
2012	7,210	+0.22%
2017	7,072	−0.39%
2023	7,012	−0.14%

Source: EHESS and INSEE (1968–2023)

== Places of interest ==
Soultz has houses from the 15th, 16th, 17th and 18th centuries.

- The Church of Saint-Maurice is a Gothic building (1270–1489)
- Château de Buchenek is a 13th-century castle, now a museum
- La Nef des Jouets (The Toys Vessel, museum of toys)
- The 1860 town hall is a Renaissance Revival building

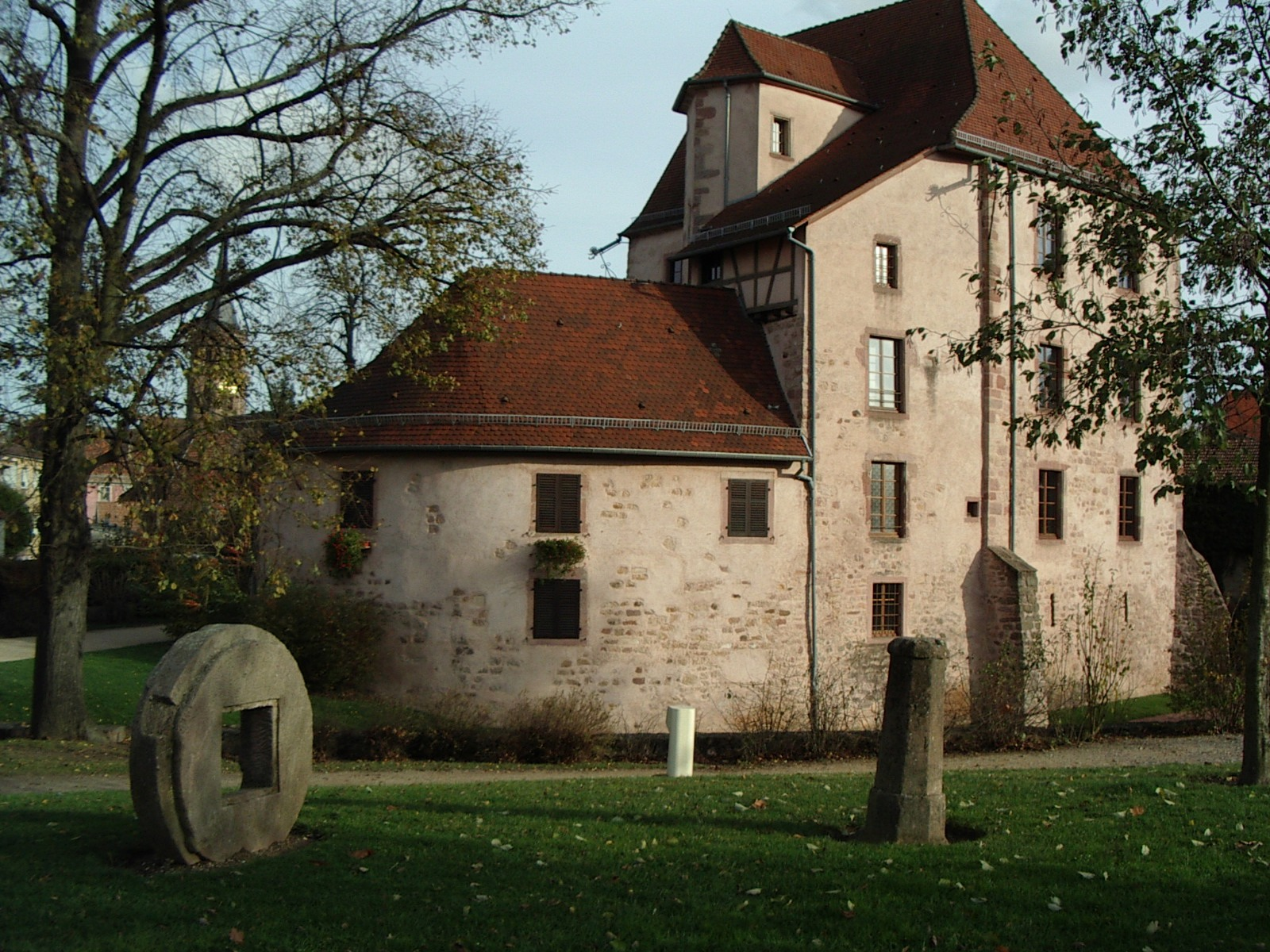
Château de Buchenek (historical museum)

== People ==
- Georges-Charles de Heeckeren d'Anthès, who married Catherine Gontcharoff, eldest sister of Alexander Pushkin's wife, and killed Pushkin in a duel.
- Auguste-César West (1810–1880), prefect of Haut-Rhin from 1848 to 1850, then prefect of Bas-Rhin until 1855 and of Haute-Garonne until 1859.
- Bernard Genghini, footballer, born in 1958 in Soultz
- Pierre Villon (1901–1980), whose real name was Pierre Ginsburger, was a French political figure who took part in the Resistance.
- Katia Krafft, volcanologist, born in 1942 in Soultz. Wife of the volcanologist Maurice Krafft. Both of them were carried off in 1991 by a pyroclastical flow on the sides of Mount Unzen (Japan).

== See also ==
- Communes of the Haut-Rhin department
