= Wattwiller =

Commune in Grand Est, France

Wattwiller Wǎttwillr
- Commune
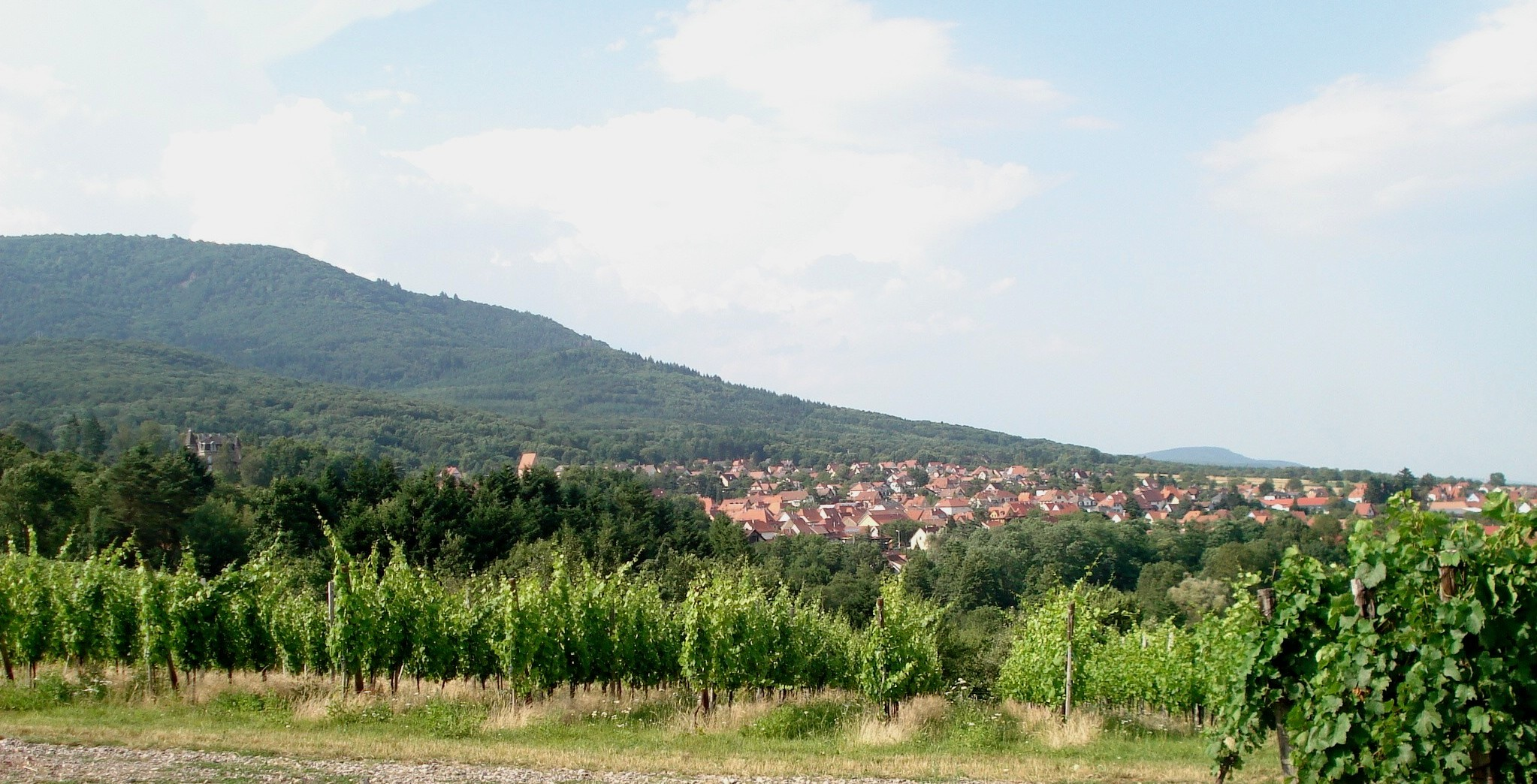
- A general view of Wattwiller

- Coat of arms
- Location of Wattwiller
- Location within France Location within Grand Est
- Coordinates: 47°50′13″N 7°10′51″E
- Country: France
- Region: Grand Est
- Department: Haut-Rhin
- Arrondissement: Thann-Guebwiller
- Canton: Cernay
- Intercommunality: Thann-Cernay

Government
  - Mayor (2020–2026): Mathieu Ermel
- Area^{1}: 13.61 km^{2} (5.25 sq mi)
- Elevation: 360 m (1,180 ft)
- Highest elevation: 1,121 m (3,678 ft)
- Lowest elevation: 266 m (873 ft)
- Population (2023): 1,636
  - Density: 120.2/km^{2} (311.3/sq mi)
- Time zone: UTC+01:00 (CET)
  - Summer (DST): UTC+02:00 (CEST)
- INSEE/Postal code: 68359 /68700
- ^{1} French Land Register data, which excludes lakes, ponds, glaciers > 1 km^{2} (0.386 sq mi or 247 acres) and river estuaries.

Wattwiller (French pronunciation: [vatvilɛʁ]; Alemannic German: Wǎttwillr; German: Wattweiler) is a commune in the Haut-Rhin department of the Grand Est region, which lies in the north-eastern part of France.

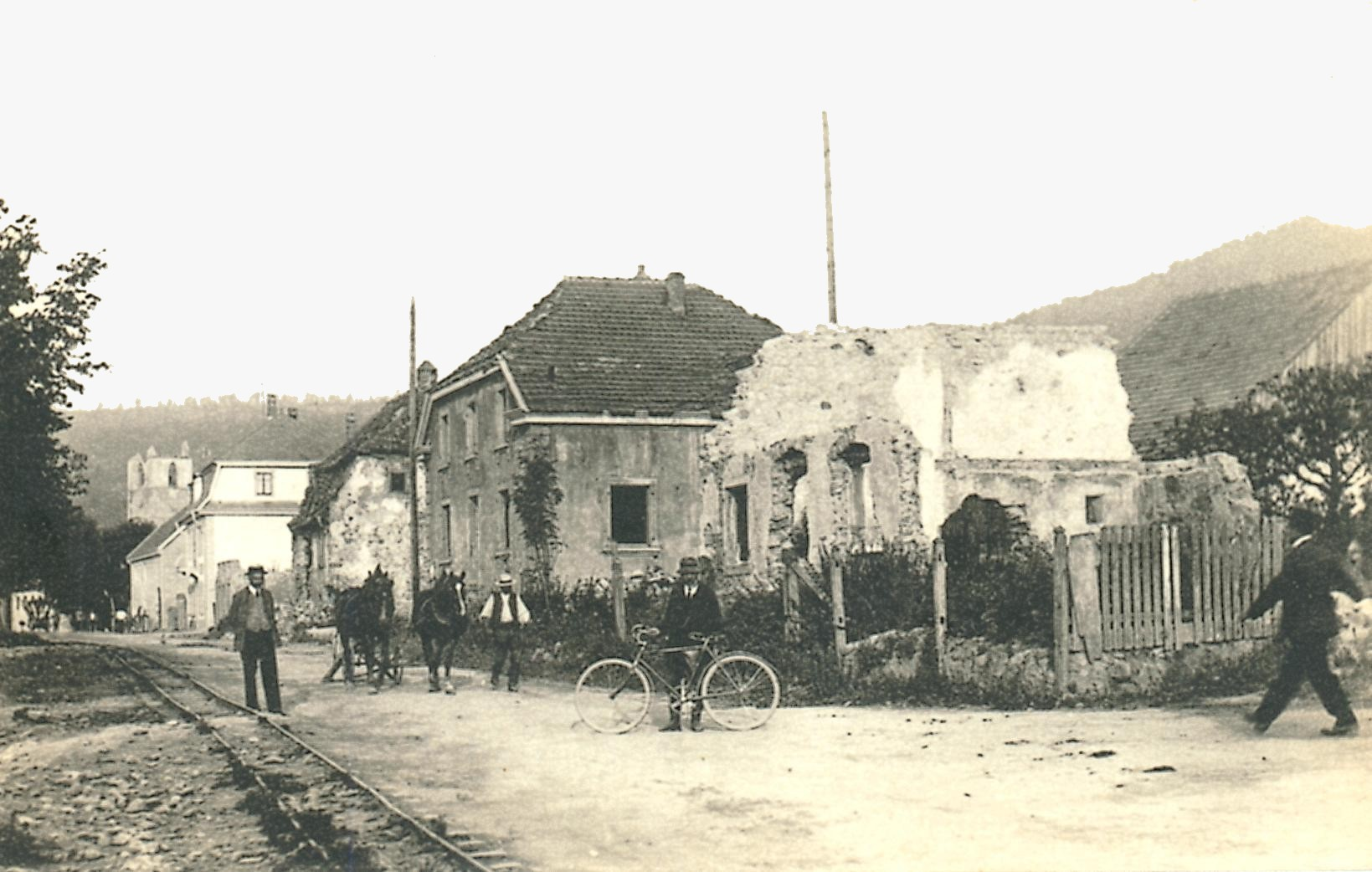
Wattwiller ruins in 1920

Located near the Vosges mountain rocky spur of Hartmannswillerkopf, Wattwiller was a strategic village in the Alsace, and suffered attacks in or near it during the Thirty Years' War and in both World Wars.

Nowadays Wattwiller is best known for its mineral water. Wattwiller is also located on the Alsace Wine Route.

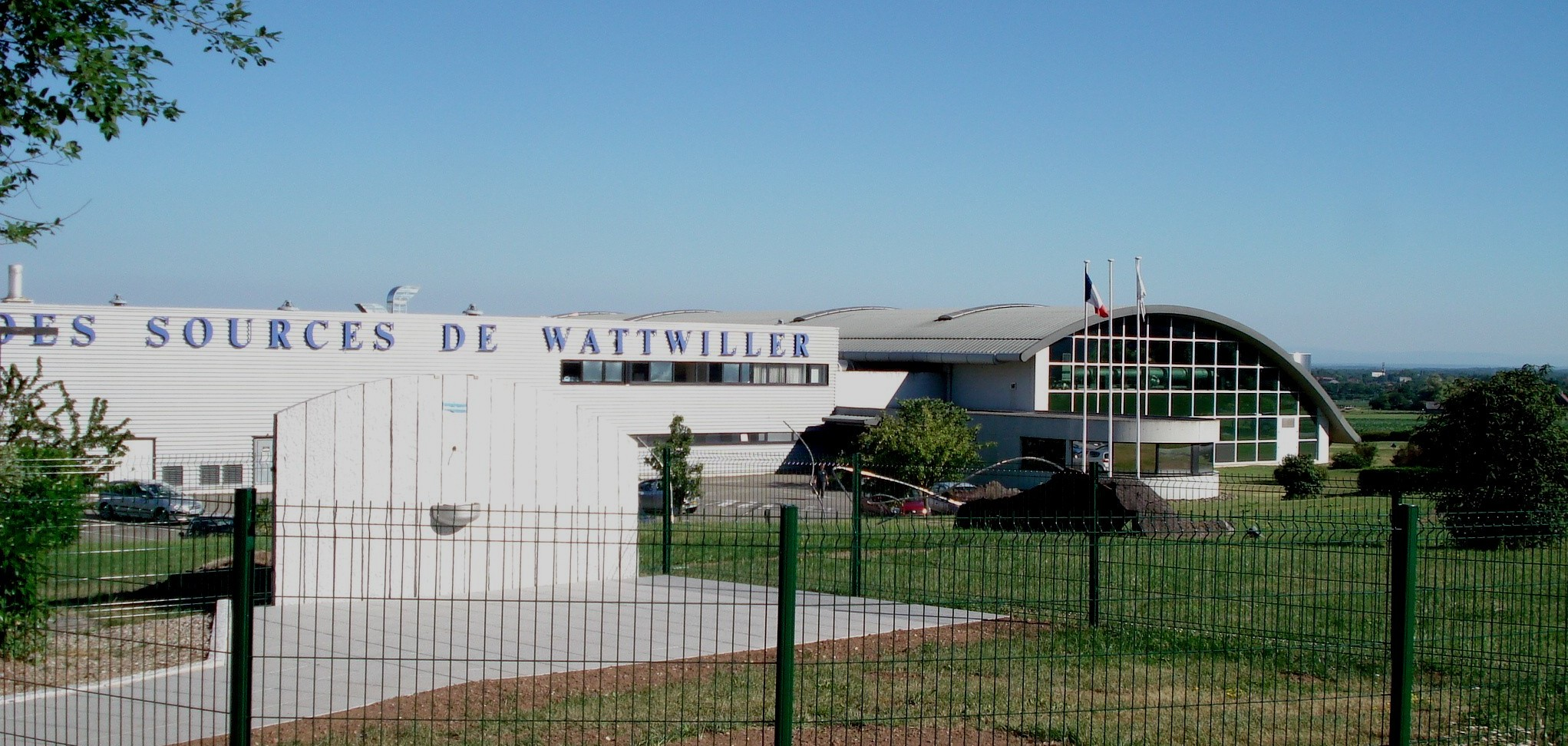
Mineral water plant

== Population ==
Historical population
Year	Pop.	±% p.a.
1968	1,020	—
1975	1,135	+1.54%
1982	1,186	+0.63%
1990	1,506	+3.03%
1999	1,593	+0.63%
2007	1,721	+0.97%
2012	1,731	+0.12%
2017	1,634	−1.15%
2023	1,636	+0.02%
Source: INSEE

== See also ==
- Communes of the Haut-Rhin department
