= Hartmannswillerkopf =

Natural feature in France

Hartmannswillerbein
- Vieil Armand
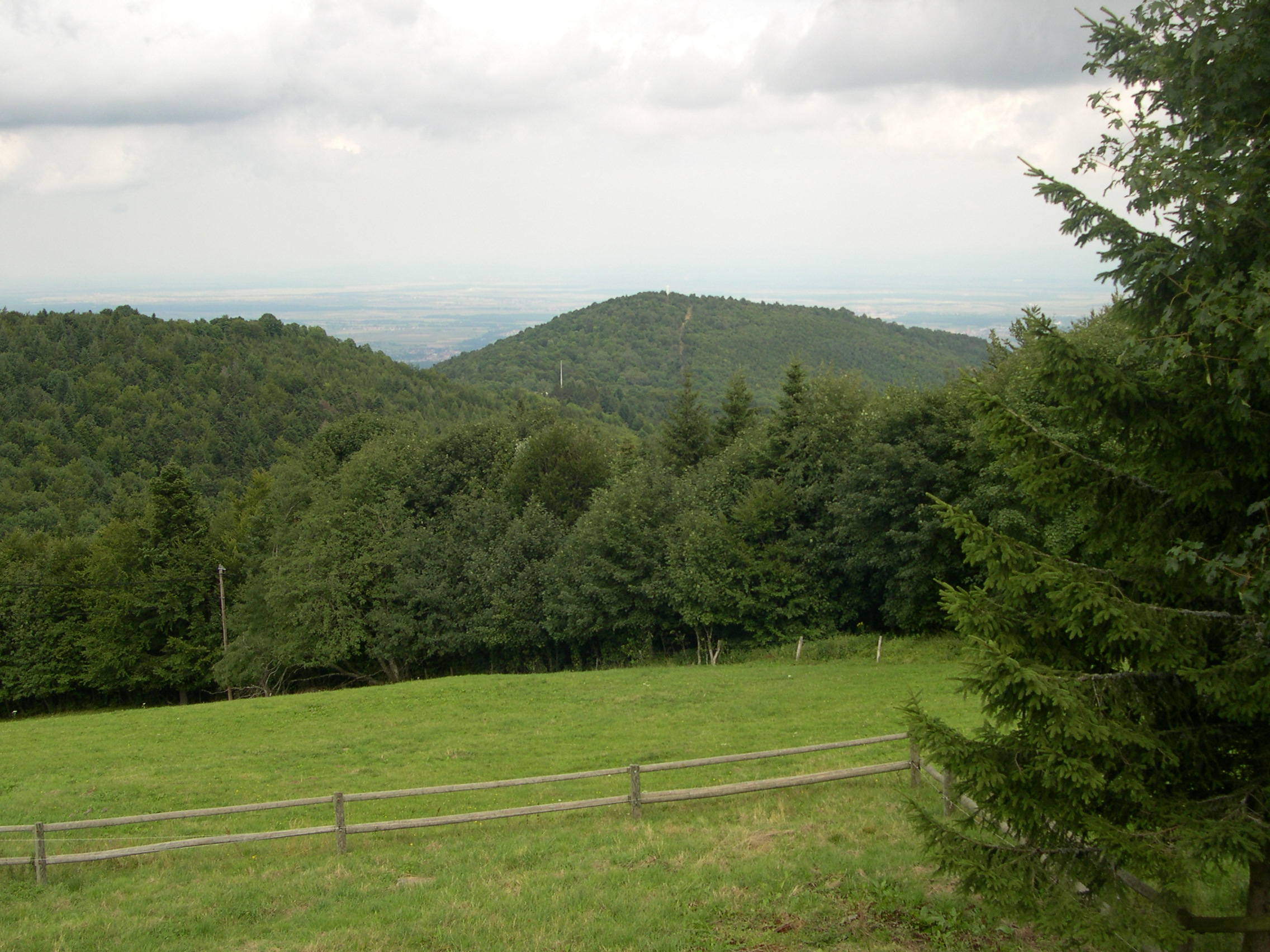
- The Hartmannswillerkopf seen from the Molkenrain

Highest point
- Elevation: 956 m (3,136 ft)
- Coordinates: 47°51′40″N 7°09′40″E

Naming
- English translation: Old Armand
- Language of name: French

Geography
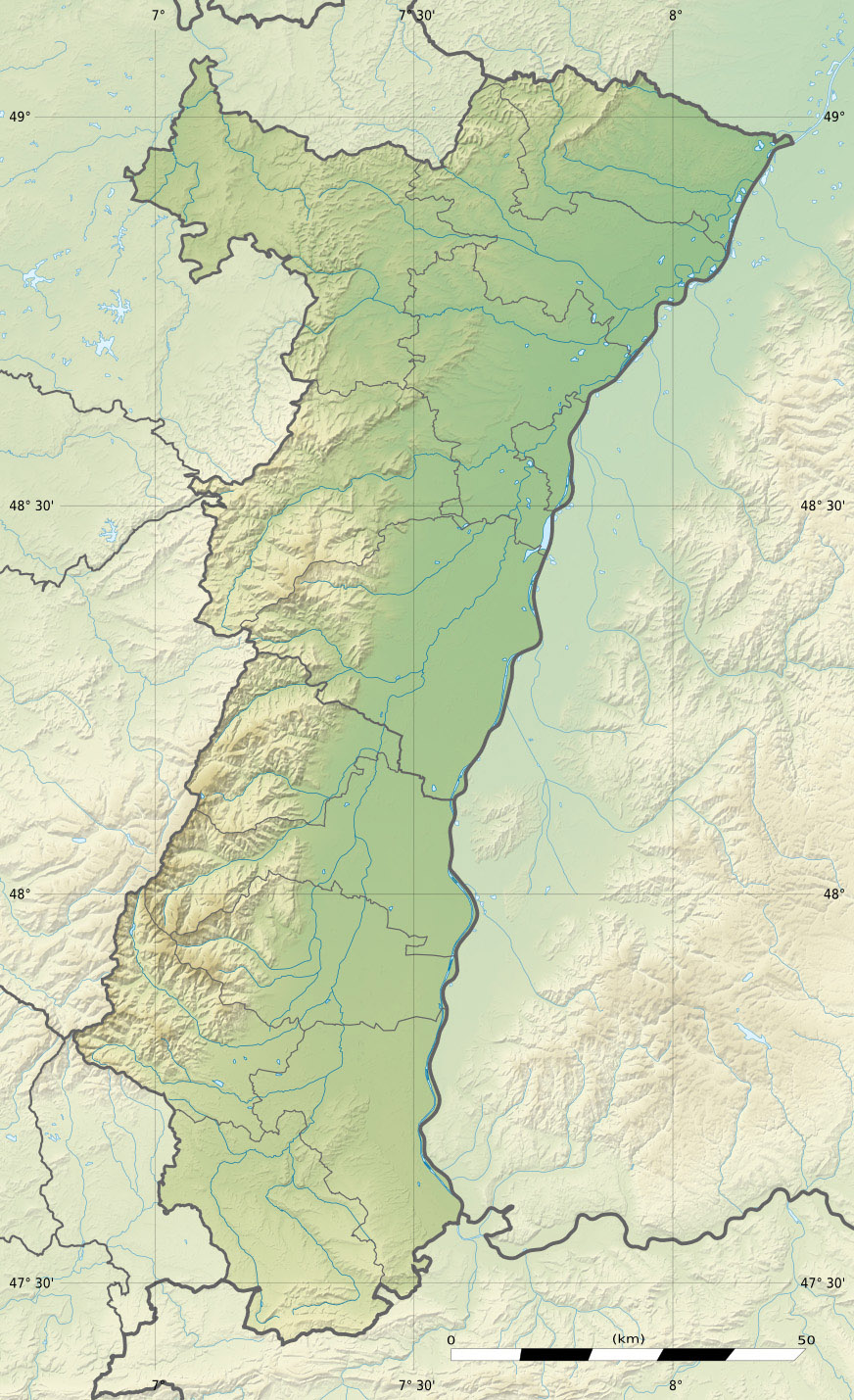
- Location within Alsace Location within France
- Location: Haut-Rhin, Alsace, France
- Parent range: Vosges Mountains

Hartmannswillerkopf, also known as the Vieil Armand (French) or Hartmannsweiler Kopf (German; English: Hartmansweiler Head) is a pyramidal rocky spur in the Vosges mountains of the Grand Est region, France. The peak stands at 956 metres (3,136 ft) overlooking the Rhine valley. At Hartmannswillerkopf stands a national monument of World War I for the fighting which took place in the trenches there.

== Mountain peak ==
The peak is 6 kilometres (3.7 mi) from Cernay and 17 kilometres (11 mi) northwest of Mulhouse. The mountain is shared by the towns of Hartmannswiller, Wuenheim, Wattwiller and Uffholtz.

== Battle ==
The French and Germans fought for control of the mountain peak during the First World War. Fighting took place throughout 1915. An estimated 25,000 French soldiers died there. After about 11 months of fierce combat, both sides began to focus most of their attention further north on the Western Front. Only enough men to hold the lines were left at Hartmannswillerkopf. The lines remained relatively stable for the rest of the war and only artillery exchanges generally took place.

== National monument ==
Hartmannswillerkopf
- France
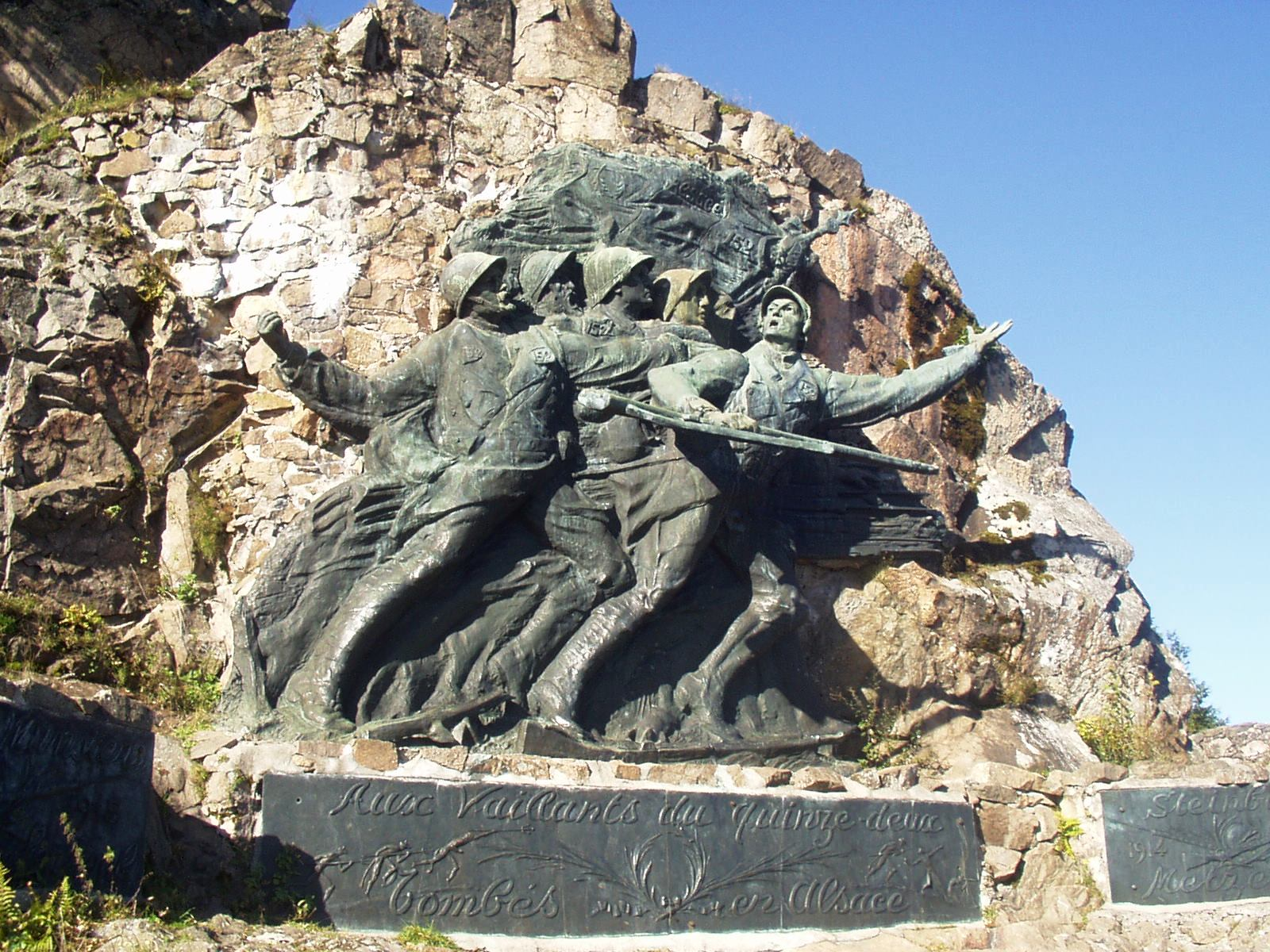
- The memorial at Hartmannswillerkopf
- For World War I battles at Hartmannswillerkopf
- Location: 47°51′32″N 7°9′0″E

Today, the area is a French national monument. There is a museum and a cemetery at the site, and it is also possible to explore the extensive trench system. Since the lines were static for such a long time, the trenches are very well preserved, especially on the German side of the front line.

There is a small memorial on the D431 north of Vieil Armand, commemorating Halifax bomber MZ807 of No. 433 Squadron RCAF, which crashed nearby in December 1944.

On 3 August 2014, French President Francois Hollande and German President Joachim Gauck together marked the centenary of Germany's declaration of war on France by laying the first stone of a memorial at Hartmannswillerkopf, for French and German soldiers killed in this area during the war. On 10 November 2017, French President Emmanuel Macron and German President Frank-Walter Steinmeier inaugurated the new memorial.

== Gallery ==
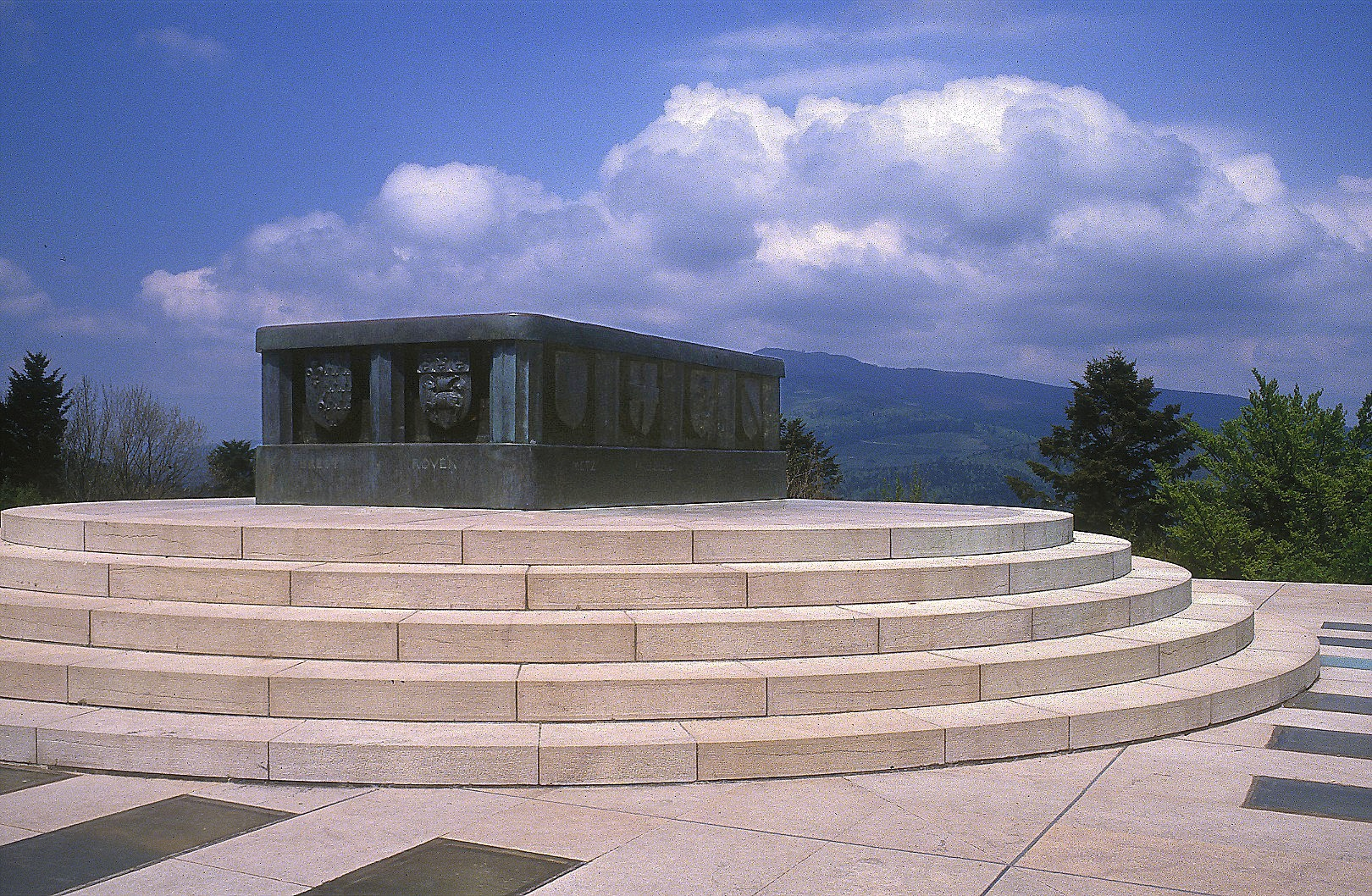
The national Monument

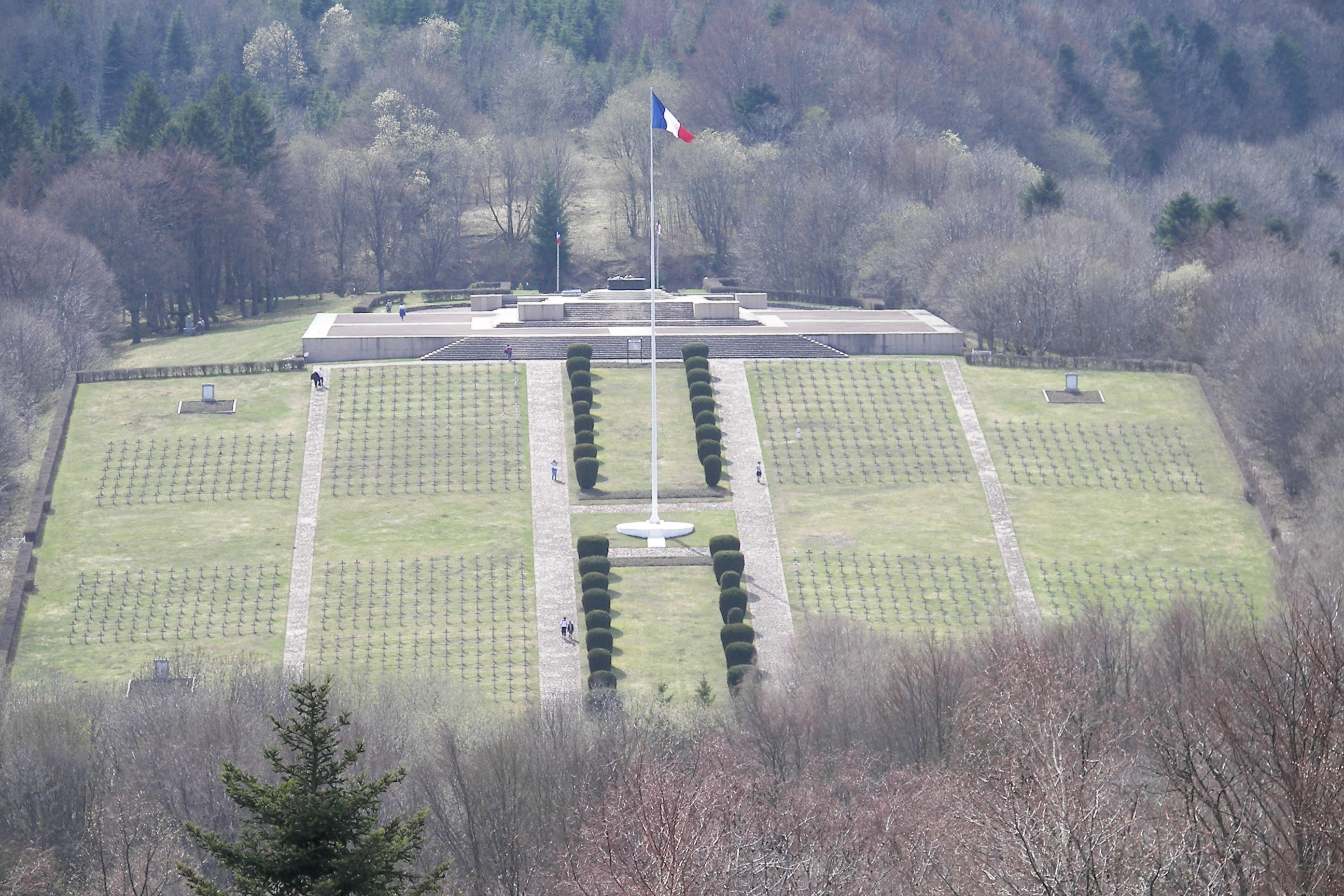
Hartmannswillerkopf cemetery

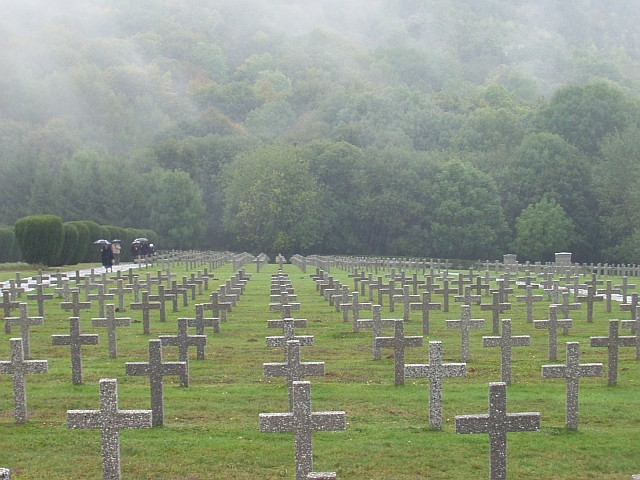
Hartmannswillerkopf cemetery

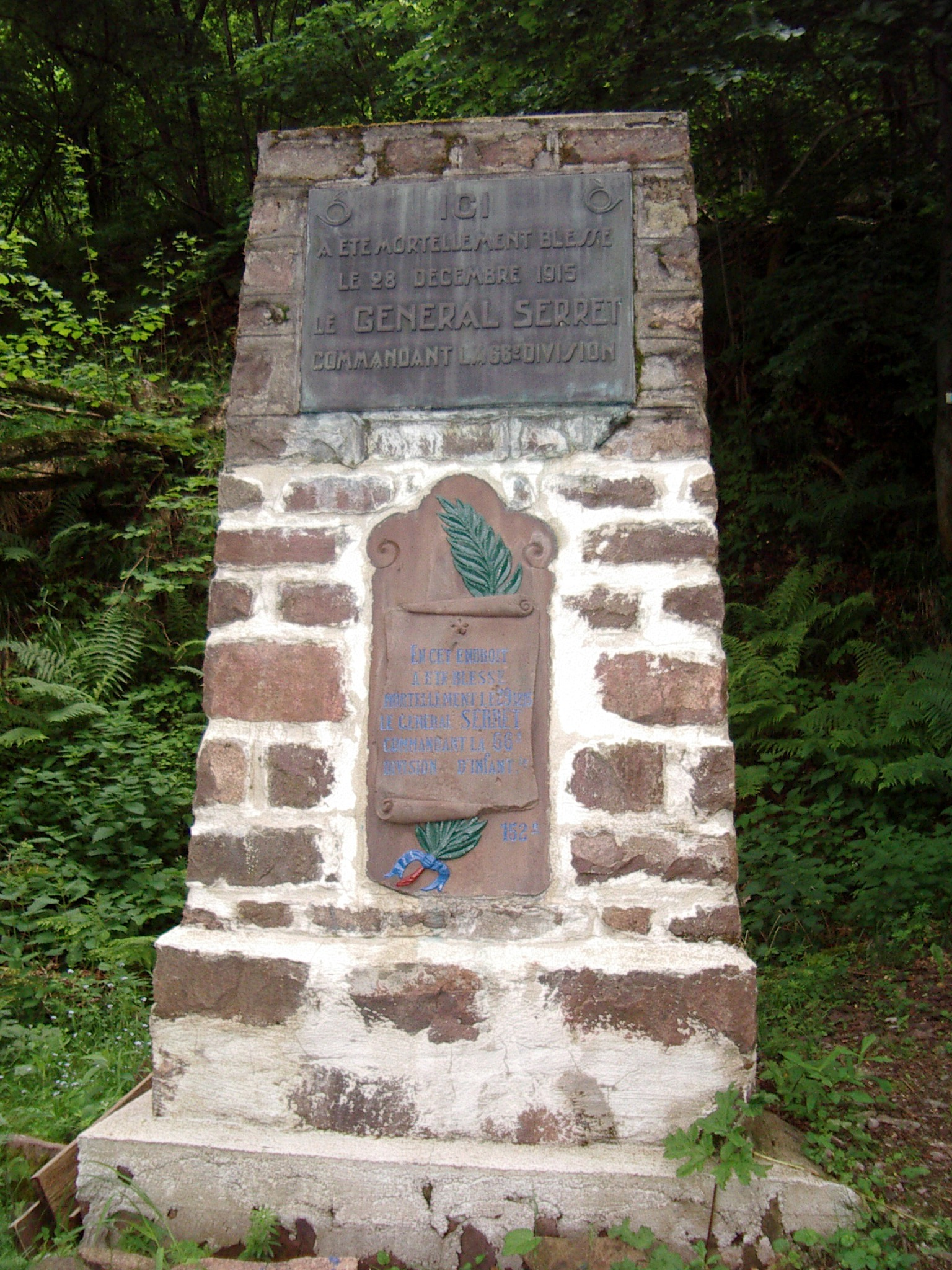
Monument to General Marcel Serret
