= 2024 French legislative election in Bas-Rhin =

Following the first round of the 2024 French legislative election on 30 June 2024, runoff elections in each constituency where no candidate received a vote share greater than 50 percent were scheduled for 7 July. Candidates permitted to stand in the runoff elections needed to either come in first or second place in the first round or achieve more than 12.5 percent of the votes of the entire electorate (as opposed to 12.5 percent of the vote share due to low turnout).

== Bas-Rhin ==
=== 1st constituency ===
Candidate	Party or alliance		First round		Second round	
Candidate	Party or alliance		Votes	%	Votes	%
Sandra Regol	New Popular Front	The Ecologists	20,631	47.60	23,414	58.81
Etienne Loos	Ensemble	Renaissance	10,513	24.26	16,399	41.19
Hombeline du Parc	National Rally		6,081	14.03		
Irène Weiss	The Republicans		2,787	6.43		
Serge Oehler	Miscellaneous left	Independent	835	1.93		
Jamal Rouchdi	Ecologists	Independent	472	1.09		
Luc Ménard	Reconquête		436	1.01		
Patrick Arbogast	Ecologists	Independent	424	0.98		
Odette Holtzer	Regionalists	Unser Land	395	0.91		
Albéric Barret	Ecologists	Independent	315	0.73		
Louise Fève	Far-left	Lutte Ouvrière	146	0.34		
Frédéric Seigle-Murandi	Volt		107	0.25		
Thomas Brant	Independent		77	0.18		
Dan Benhamou	Far-left	Ecologists	77	0.18		
Thomas Schlund	Ecologists	Independent	43	0.10		
Etienne Génieux	Far-left	Ecologists	0	0.00		
Total			43,339	100.00	39,813	100.00
Valid votes			43,339	98.94	39,813	94.93
Invalid votes			143	0.33	516	1.23
Blank votes			321	0.73	1,612	3.84
Total votes			43,803	100.00	41,941	100.00
Registered voters/turnout			62,541	70.04	62,563	67.04

=== 2nd constituency ===
Candidate	Party or alliance		First round		Second round	
Candidate	Party or alliance		Votes	%	Votes	%
Emmanuel Fernandes	New Popular Front	La France Insoumise	21,533	43.91	24,089	48.79
Rebecca Breitman	Ensemble	Democratic Movement	11,063	22.56	13,962	28.28
Virginie Joron	National Rally		10,407	21.22	11,326	22.94
Alexandre Wolf-Samaloussi	The Republicans		3,287	6.70		
Cendrine Diemunsch	Regionalists	Unser Land	819	1.67		
Jean-Marc Governatori	Ecologists	Independent	685	1.40		
Fabienne Schnitzler	Ecologists	Independent	473	0.96		
Elisa Clolot	Volt		358	0.73		
Alain Richard	Far-left	Lutte Ouvrière	262	0.53		
Clement Soubise	Far-left	New Anticapitalist Party (Note: Dissident who ran without the backing of the New Popular Front)	154	0.31		
Total			49,041	100.00	49,377	100.00
Valid votes			49,041	98.62	49,377	98.16
Invalid votes			209	0.42	217	0.43
Blank votes			476	0.96	709	1.41
Total votes			49,726	100.00	50,303	100.00
Registered voters/turnout			72,992	68.13	73,016	68.89

=== 3rd constituency ===
Candidate	Party or alliance		First round		Second round	
Candidate	Party or alliance		Votes	%	Votes	%
Thierry Sother	New Popular Front	Socialist Party	17,355	37.94	20,150	43.27
Bruno Studer	Ensemble	Renaissance	13,260	28.99	15,115	32.46
Stéphanie Dô	National Rally		10,567	23.10	11,302	24.27
Dera Ratsiajetsinimaro	The Republicans		1,760	3.85		
Gautier Perrin	Regionalists	Unser Land	813	1.78		
Thierry Parat	Ecologists	Independent	782	1.71		
Alexandre Zyzeck	Reconquête		420	0.92		
Mohamed Sylla	Miscellaneous left	Independent	294	0.64		
Denise Grandmougin	Far-left	Lutte Ouvrière	252	0.55		
Félix Kleimann	Volt		129	0.28		
Hicham Hamza	Miscellaneous left	Independent	112	0.24		
Camille Robert	Far-left	Independent	0	0.00		
Total			45,744	100.00	46,567	100.00
Valid votes			45,744	98.44	46,567	98.24
Invalid votes			257	0.55	213	0.45
Blank votes			467	1.00	620	1.31
Total votes			46,468	100.00	47,400	100.00
Registered voters/turnout			70,945	65.50	70,961	66.80

=== 4th constituency ===
Candidate	Party or alliance		First round		Second round	
Candidate	Party or alliance		Votes	%	Votes	%
Delphine Daubenberger	National Rally		22,625	33.11	26,130	38.56
Françoise Buffet	Ensemble	Renaissance	22,107	32.36	41,629	61.44
Raphaële Krattinger	New Popular Front	La France Insoumise	14,297	20.92		
Nelly Aeschelmann	The Republicans		3,936	5.76		
Catherine Berthol	Miscellaneous right	Independent	2,389	3.50		
Bénédicte Matz	Regionalists	Unser Land	1,982	2.90		
Jean-Louis Bigot	Reconquête		645	0.94		
Mehdi Benhlal	Far-left	Lutte Ouvrière	344	0.50		
Total			68,325	100.00	67,759	100.00
Valid votes			68,325	98.19	67,759	96.04
Invalid votes			360	0.52	610	0.86
Blank votes			902	1.30	2,184	3.10
Total votes			69,587	100.00	70,553	100.00
Registered voters/turnout			99,049	70.26	99,066	71.22

=== 5th constituency ===
Candidate	Party or alliance		First round		Second round	
Candidate	Party or alliance		Votes	%	Votes	%
Thomas Estève	National Rally		27,897	39.20	31,778	44.82
Charles Sitzenstuhl	Ensemble	Renaissance	22,993	32.31	39,124	55.18
Marc Ruhlmann	New Popular Front	Socialist Party	12,043	16.92		
Léo Coutaud	The Republicans		3,529	4.96		
Sarah Weiss Moessmer	Regionalists	Unser Land	2,681	3.77		
Christian Dantz	Ecologists	Independent	803	1.13		
Bastien Macia	Sovereigntist right	Debout la France	767	1.08		
Patrick Dutter	Far-left	Lutte Ouvrière	446	0.63		
Total			71,159	100.00	70,902	100.00
Valid votes			71,159	97.97	70,902	96.05
Invalid votes			464	0.64	675	0.91
Blank votes			1,007	1.39	2,243	3.04
Total votes			72,630	100.00	73,820	100.00
Registered voters/turnout			107,594	67.50	107,602	68.60

=== 6th constituency ===
Candidate	Party or alliance		First round		Second round	
Candidate	Party or alliance		Votes	%	Votes	%
Vincent Coussedière	National Rally		25,275	38.50	29,338	44.98
Louise Morel	Ensemble	Democratic Movement	18,228	27.76	35,890	55.02
Didier Andres	New Popular Front	The Ecologists	10,076	15.35		
Jean Biehler	The Republicans		8,739	13.31		
Carine Hamm	Regionalists	Unser Land	1,770	2.70		
Patricia Marle	Sovereigntist right	Debout la France	634	0.97		
Sabrina Ritter	Reconquête		494	0.75		
René Camus	Far-left	Lutte Ouvrière	362	0.55		
Ryan Geyer	Independent		79	0.12		
Total			65,657	100.00	65,228	100.00
Valid votes			65,657	98.09	65,228	96.13
Invalid votes			355	0.53	568	0.84
Blank votes			923	1.38	2,056	3.03
Total votes			66,935	100.00	67,852	100.00
Registered voters/turnout			98,222	68.15	99,281	68.34

=== 7th constituency ===
Candidate	Party or alliance		First round		Second round	
Candidate	Party or alliance		Votes	%	Votes	%
Denis Kieffer	National Rally		23,071	41.47	25,558	45.20
Patrick Hetzel	The Republicans		17,974	32.31	30,986	54.80
Serge Bloch	New Popular Front	La France Insoumise	6,912	12.42		
Eric Wolff	Ensemble	Democratic Movement	4,734	8.51		
Anastasie Leipp	Regionalists	Unser Land	1,821	3.27		
Arthur Wolff	Reconquête		707	1.27		
Jean Meyer	Far-left	Lutte Ouvrière	414	0.74		
Total			55,633	100.00	56,544	100.00
Valid votes			55,633	97.93	56,544	96.77
Invalid votes			374	0.66	472	0.81
Blank votes			800	1.41	1,413	2.42
Total votes			56,807	100.00	58,429	100.00
Registered voters/turnout			86,142	65.95	86,164	67.81

=== 8th constituency ===
Candidate	Party or alliance		First round		Second round	
Candidate	Party or alliance		Votes	%	Votes	%
Théo Bernhardt	National Rally		26,313	44.16	31,015	51.44
Stéphanie Kochert	Ensemble	Horizons	14,006	23.51	29,284	48.56
Victor Vogt	Miscellaneous right	The Republicans	6,818	11.44		
Myriam Zekagh	New Popular Front	La France Insoumise	5,432	9.12		
Christian Klipfel	Miscellaneous right	Independent	4,731	7.94		
Claire Grosheitsch	Ecologists	Independent	739	1.24		
Nathan Hackenschmidt	Reconquête		663	1.11		
Stella Batisse	Sovereigntist right	Debout la France	576	0.97		
Catherine Gsell	Far-left	Lutte Ouvrière	306	0.51		
Total			59,584	100.00	60,299	100.00
Valid votes			59,584	97.89	60,299	96.32
Invalid votes			364	0.60	574	0.92
Blank votes			920	1.51	1,730	2.76
Total votes			60,868	100.00	62,603	100.00
Registered voters/turnout			94,678	64.29	94,700	66.11

=== 9th constituency ===
Candidate	Party or alliance		First round		Second round	
Candidate	Party or alliance		Votes	%	Votes	%
Marc Wolff	National Rally		25,199	40.47	28,930	45.94
Vincent Thiebaut	Ensemble	Horizons	18,206	29.24	34,046	54.06
Olivier Terrien	New Popular Front	Socialist Party	9,680	15.55		
Philippe Pfrimmer	Miscellaneous right	Independent	5,512	8.85		
Maurice Gluck	Regionalists	Unser Land	2,583	4.15		
Robin Gerolt	Reconquête		678	1.09		
Yann Lucas	Far-left	Lutte Ouvrière	406	0.65		
Total			62,264	100.00	62,976	100.00
Valid votes			62,264	98.16	62,976	96.62
Invalid votes			360	0.57	523	0.80
Blank votes			804	1.27	1,677	2.57
Total votes			63,428	100.00	65,176	100.00
Registered voters/turnout			96,216	65.92	96,278	67.70
