= Alsatian Alternative =

Left-wing regionalist political party in Alsace, France

Alternative Alsacienne – ’s Lìnke Elsàss Alternative Alsacienne – ’s Linke Elsass
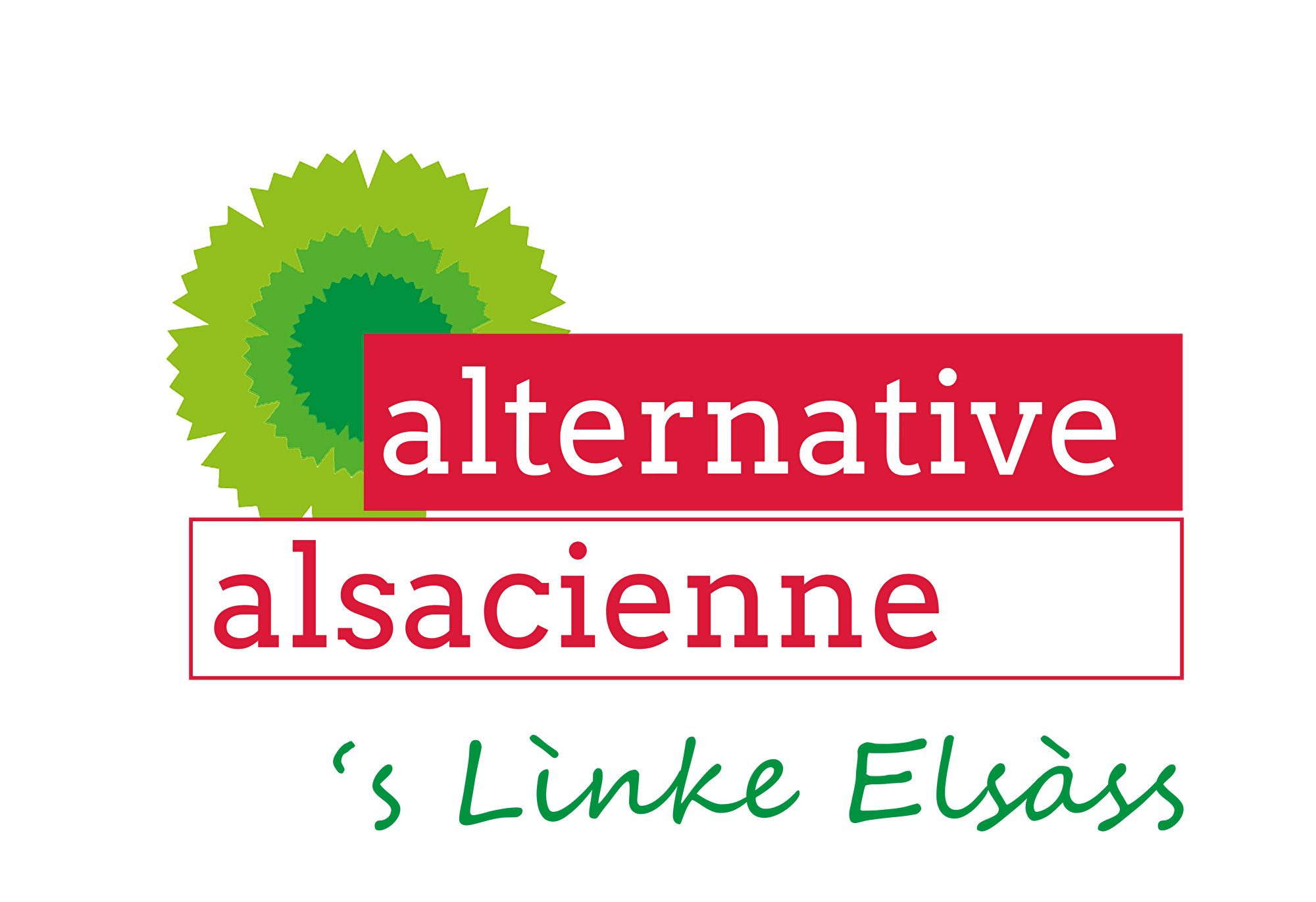
- President: Jonathan Herry
- Founded: 2020
- Headquarters: Alsace, France
- Ideology: Left-wing regionalism Social democracy Environmentalism; Decentralisation; Federalism
- Political position: Left-wing
- National affiliation: New Popular Front
- Colours: Green; Red

Website
- www.alternative-alsacienne-s-linke-elsass.alsace

Alternative Alsacienne – ’s Lìnke Elsàss is a small left-wing, regionalist political party active in Alsace, France. Founded in 2020 out of the association Objectif Euro-région Alsace, it advocates a social and ecological programme combined with stronger political autonomy for Alsace within a decentralised French Republic and a more federal European Union.

== History ==
The party emerged in October 2020 when the association Objectif Euro-région Alsace rebranded as Alternative Alsacienne – ’s Linke Elsass, positioning itself as a left-wing partner of Alsatian ecologists. Since then the party has taken part in local campaigns and supported green and left coalitions in the region, including during the 2024 snap legislative elections when it publicly called for a “front populaire”. In August 2025, at the Greens’ summer days held in Strasbourg, the party signalled ongoing cooperation with ecological and left partners.

== Ideology and positions ==
Alternative Alsacienne defines itself as a local party federating “all left sensibilities” in favour of an “emancipated Alsace” in a Sixth Republic and a federal Europe. Its platform emphasises enhanced autonomy for Alsace within France; environmental action at Rhine-basin scale; defence of bilingualism and Franco-German/Rhenish cultural ties; social rights and anti-poverty measures; equality for women and LGBT people; support for minorities and migrants; and territorial equity between urban and rural areas. Media have described the party’s line as “left-wing regionalism”.

== Organisation ==
The party is governed by a collegial executive committee. As of 2025 the president is Jonathan Herry; the bureau also includes a vice-president, a secretary and a treasurer.

== Elected officials ==
Although small, the party reports several local mandates in Alsace. These include:

- Jonathan Herry, delegated municipal councillor in Strasbourg responsible for bilingualism and regional cultures, and neighbourhood councillor for Neuhof-Sud (also an Eurometropolis councillor).
- Flavien Ancely-Frey, opposition municipal councillor in Colmar.
- Perrine Torrent, municipal councillor in Thann.

== See also ==
- Alsace
- Alsace independence movement
- Alsace First
- Unser Land
