= Alsace independence movement =

Secessionist movement in France

Alsace autonomist movement
- Mouvement autonomiste alsacien
- Rot un Wiss, the original flag of Alsace, with origins in the red and white banner of Gérard d'Alsace, Duke of Lorraine in the 11th century.
- Type: Independence movement Regionalism (politics)
- Purpose: Greater autonomy
- Region served: Alsace
- Methods: Protests; Party politics
- Affiliations: Alsace d'abord Unser Land

Coat of arms of Alsace, representing Haut-Rhin and Bas-Rhin.

The Alsace independence movement (French: Mouvement autonomiste alsacien; Alsatian: D'Elsässischa Salbschtstandikaitbewegùng; German: Elsässische autonome Bewegung) is a cultural, ideological and political regionalist movement for greater autonomy or outright independence of Alsace.

Purposes generally include opposition to centralist territorial, political and legal pretensions of either France ("Jacobin policies"), including the new French region Grand Est since 1 January 2016, and Pan-Germanism of Germany; or both. It instead generally favours regional decentralization including political and fiscal autonomy for Alsace, promoting the defense of its culture, history, traditions, and bilingualism of the Alsatian language. A slogan that has sometimes occurred in protests in the 21st century is "Elsass frei" ("Alsace free").

Several mass protests have taken place in public places around Alsace in opposition to the French region of Grand Est, with ratification on 1 January 2016. In addition, several Alsatian organisations and political parties have been formed to promote the cause, notably Alsace d'abord and Unser Land.

The movement of greater autonomy of Alsace runs partly parallel to that of Alemannic separatism, originating in the Napoleonic era (c. 1805–1815) and briefly revived both after World War I (1919) and after World War II (1946–1952).

== History ==
Present location of Alsace within France.

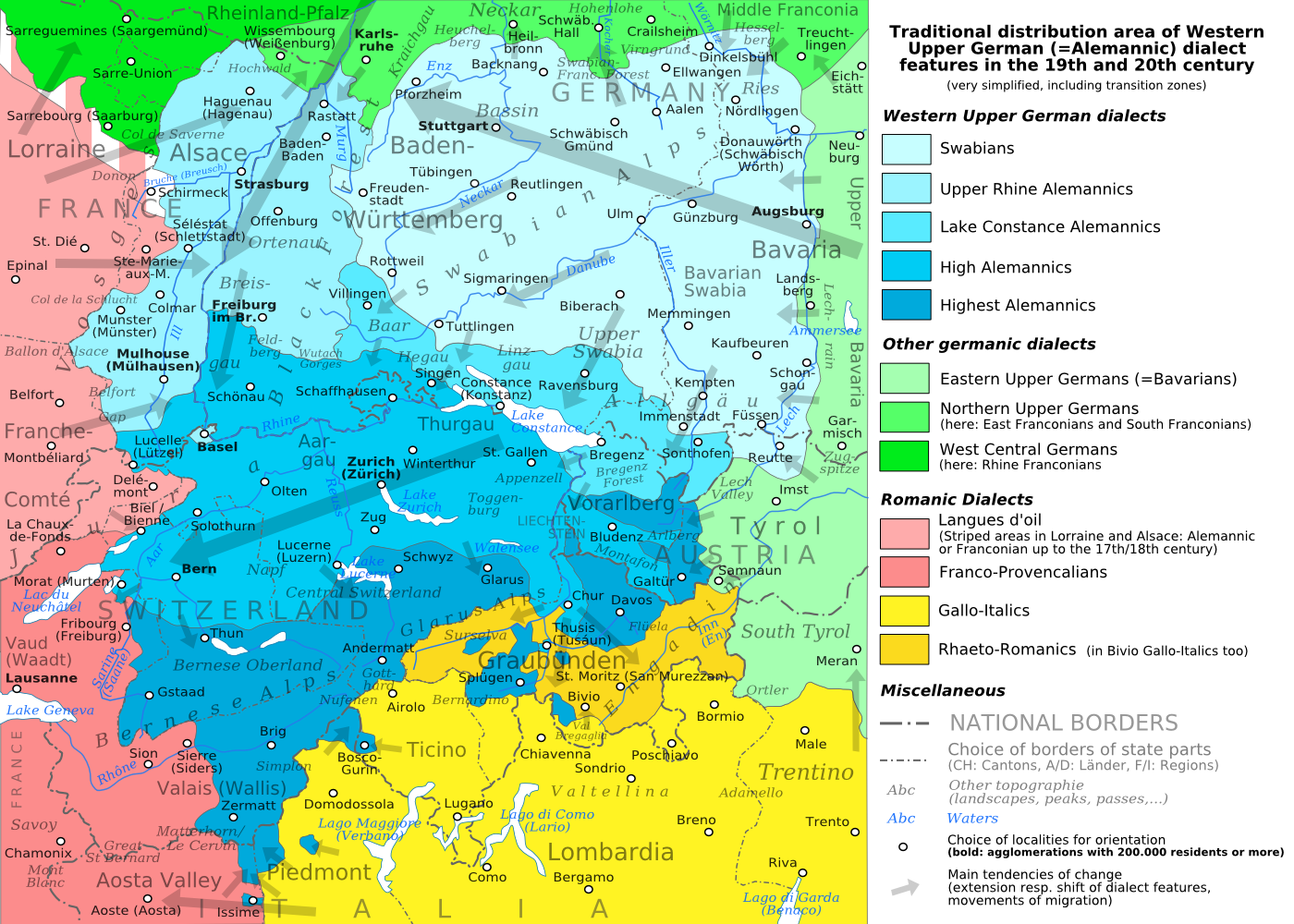
Traditional distribution of the Alsatian language as an Upper Rhine German or Alemannic dialect in the 19th and 20th century.

=== Background ===
The expansionist doctrines of France since the time of Louis XIV has caused Alsatians to be subject to many shifts in European history.

Over the centuries, many figures and organisations have contributed to the cause of rejected either or both of these pretentions, promoting varying degrees of autonomy or even independence, both in public and in form of political participation.

Various autonomist and separatist movements in Alsace have received support from over the political spectrum, including left, centre and right despite the diverse political ideologies.

=== 19th century ===
- Alsatian Workers and Peasants Party

=== World War II ===
The establishment of Nazi Germany and the annexation of Alsace-Lorraine during the World War II, introduced a new situation for many Alsatians, including hardships for many, such as the malgré-nous. However, some advocates of autonomy for Alsace saw the new regime as a chance to re-enacted rights for the culture and autonomy of the Alsatians formerly under French government. While few were actually attracted to the antisemitism or authoritarianism of the regime, a number of Alsatian autonomists were subsequently accused of collaboration with Nazi officials after the war, some of which were trialed, prisoned or even executed.

- fr:Fritz Spieser (1902–1987)
- de:Paul Schall (1898–1981)
- Joseph Bilger (1905–1975)
- fr:Marcel Stürmel (1900–1972)
- fr:Camille Dahlet (1883–1963)
- Joseph Rossé (1892–1951)
- Jean-Pierre Mourer (1897–1947)
- Charles Hueber (1883–1943)
- fr:Charles Roos (1878–1940)
- Eugène Ricklin (1862–1935)

After war, also related groups fr:Nanziger and fr:Loups Noirs remained notable.

However, other Alsatians were staunch opponents of the Nazi occupation such as the artist Jean-Jacques Waltz.

== After reattachment to France ==
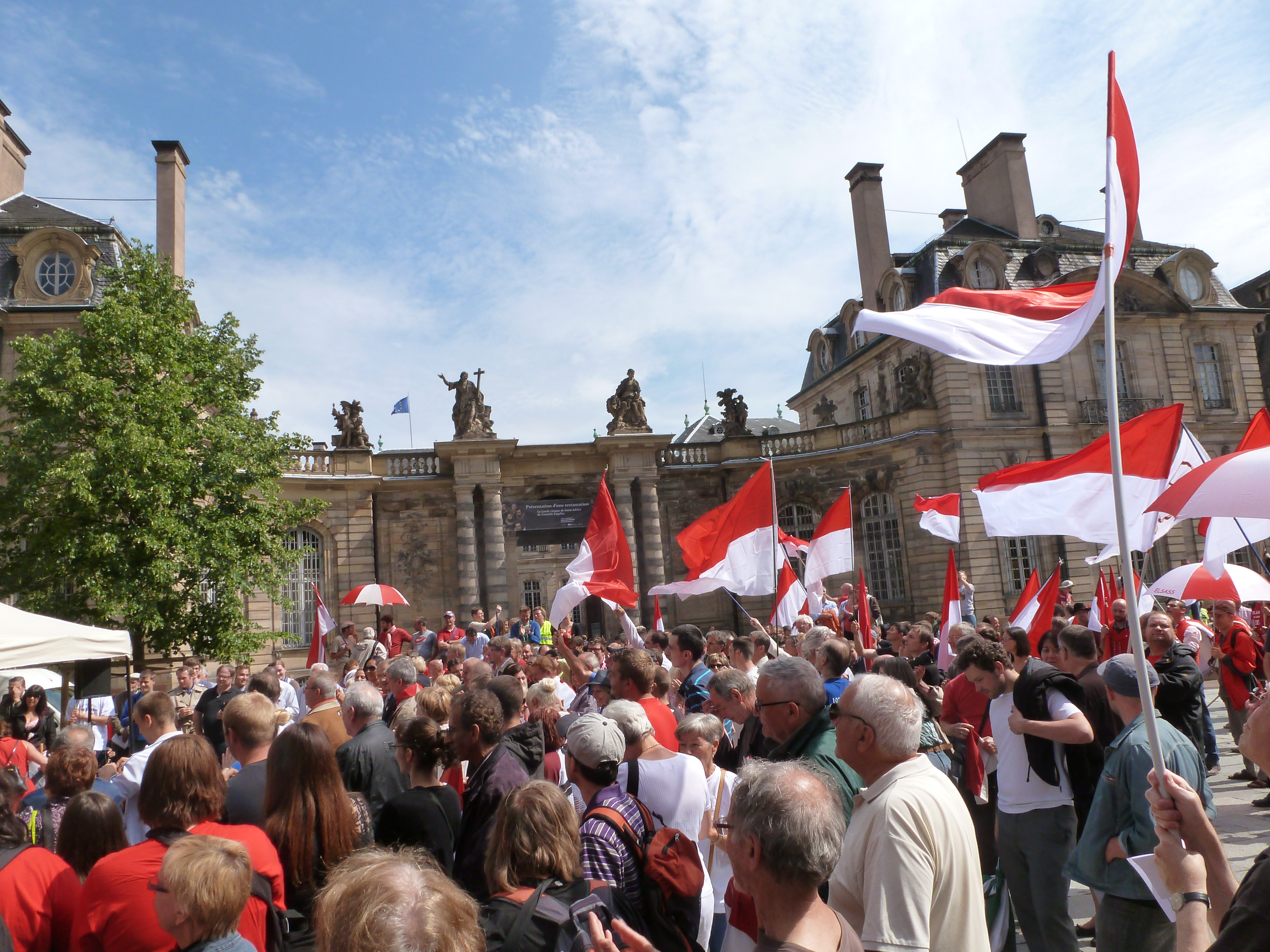
Protests against the new French region of Grand Est.

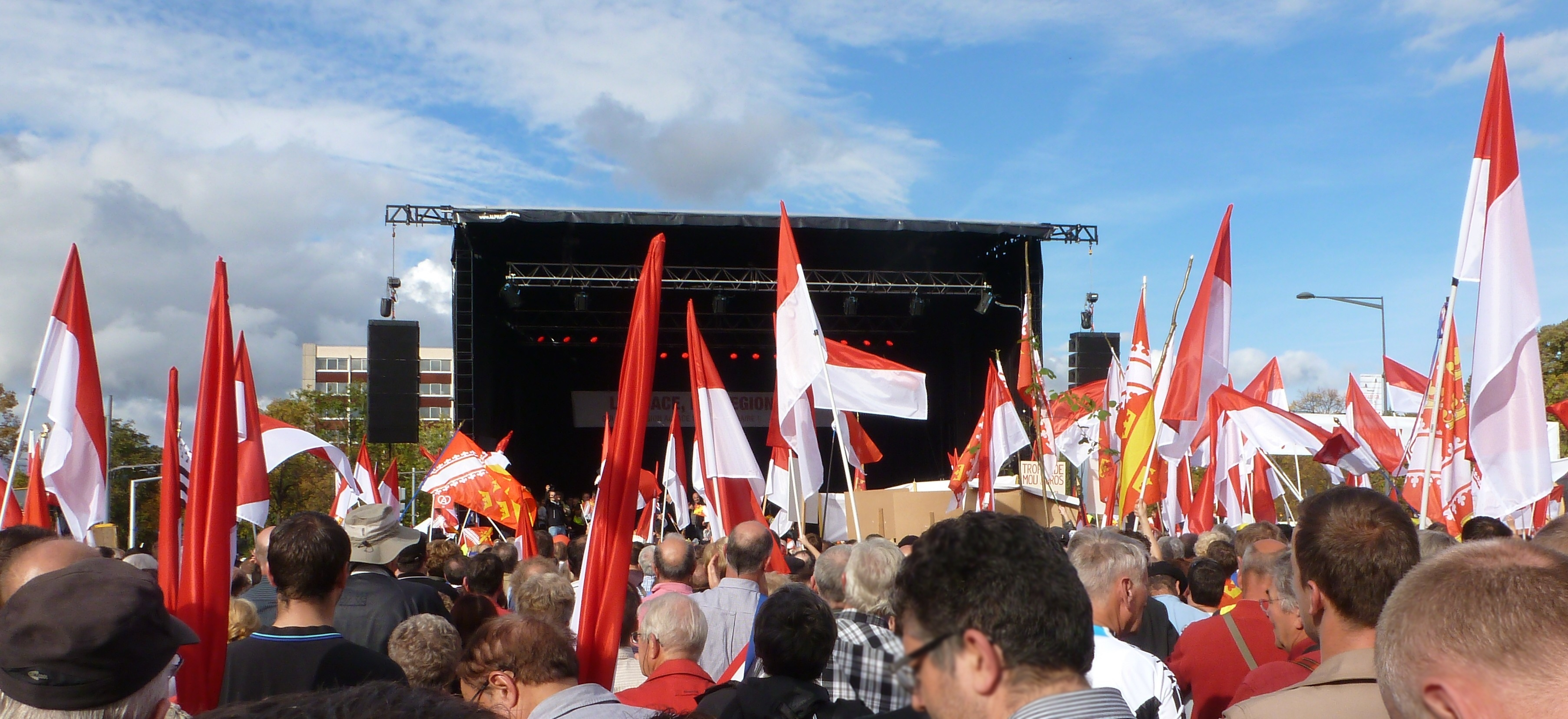
Protests.

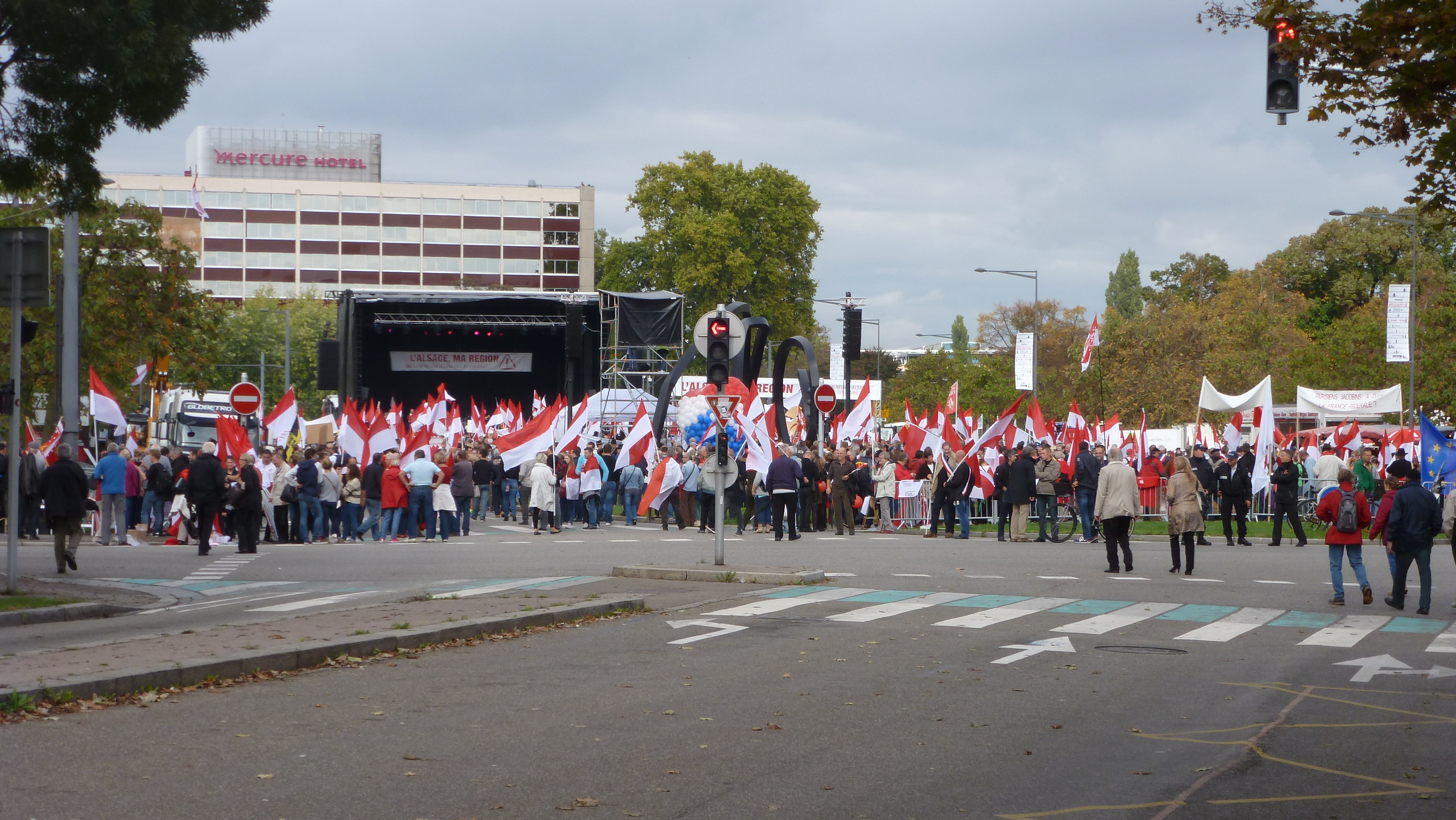
Protests against Grand Est.

In contemporary Alsace, Unser Land, formed in 2009 after the merger of Union du peuple alsacien and Fer's Elsass, constitutes the most notable current political party associated with promotion of greater autonomy of Alsace. Alsace d'abord is another smaller organisation.

=== Political parties ===
- Alsace d'abord
  - fr:Robert Spieler (born 1951) (as well as other political parties)
  - fr:Jacques Cordonnier (born 1950)
- fr:Front culturel alsacien
  - fr:André Weckmann (1924–2012)
  - fr:Andrée Buchmann (born 1956)
- Unser land

=== Organisations ===
- fr:Solidarité alsacienne

=== Other ===
- fr:Pierre Zind (1923–1988)

=== Loss of regional status ===
Despite many protests, the new French region of Grand Est was introduced with ratification on 1 January 2016.

== Gallery ==
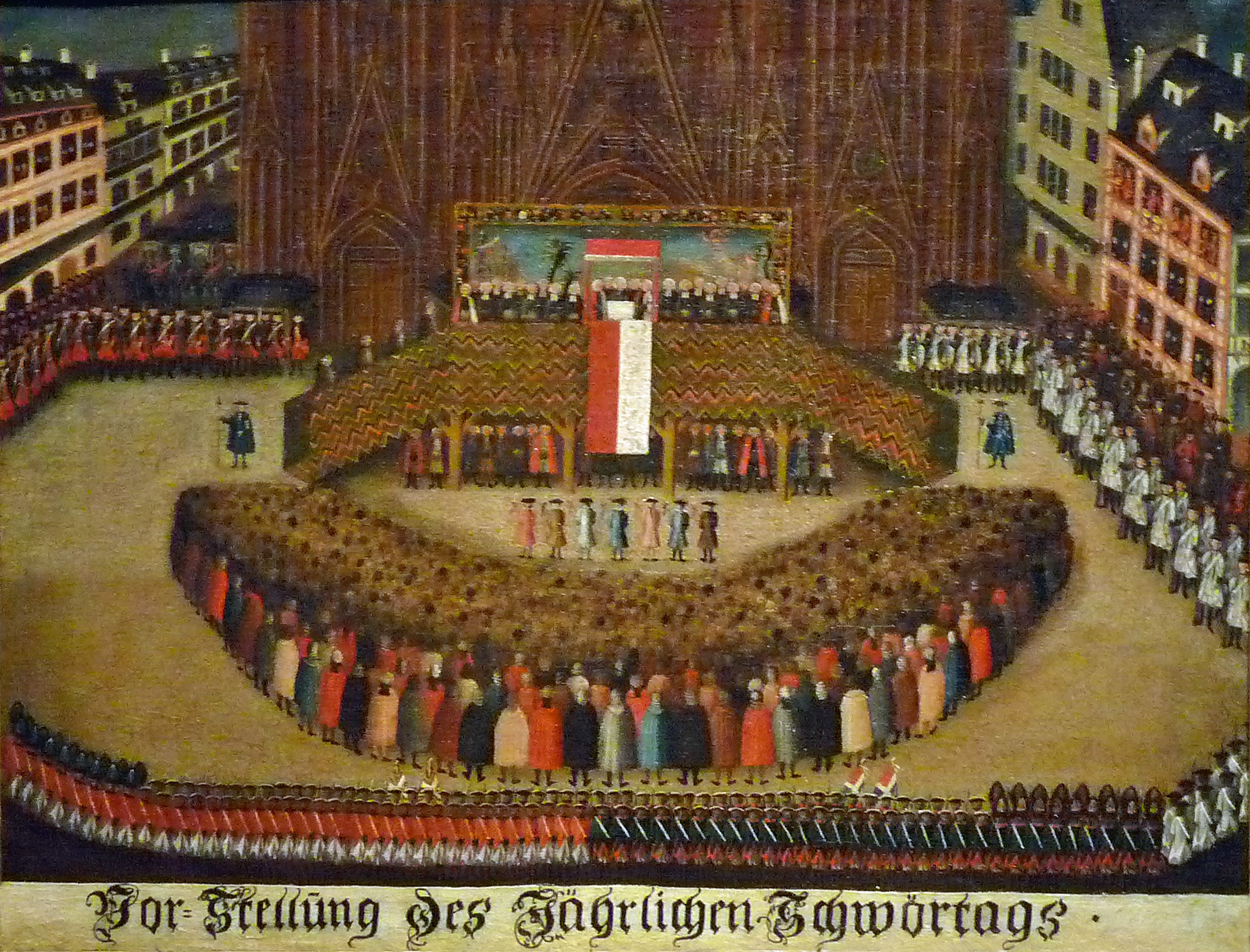
Painting of the ceremony of the Schwoertag (circa 1785), Musée historique de Strasbourg.

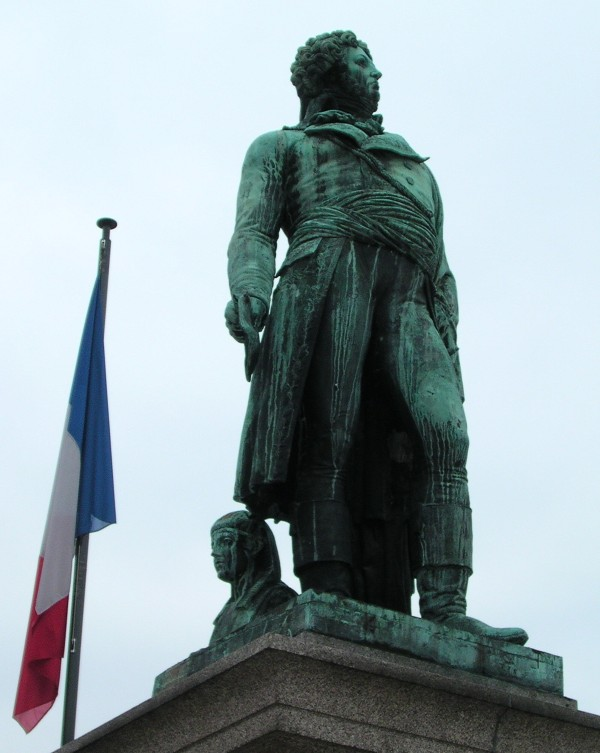
Statue of General Jean Baptiste Kléber (1753–1800) in Place Kléber, Strasbourg, erected in 1838. Kléber, who was born to a builder in Strasbourg, was undoubtedly one of the greatest generals of the French Revolutionary Wars; second in command only to Napoleon before death in Cairo, Egypt.

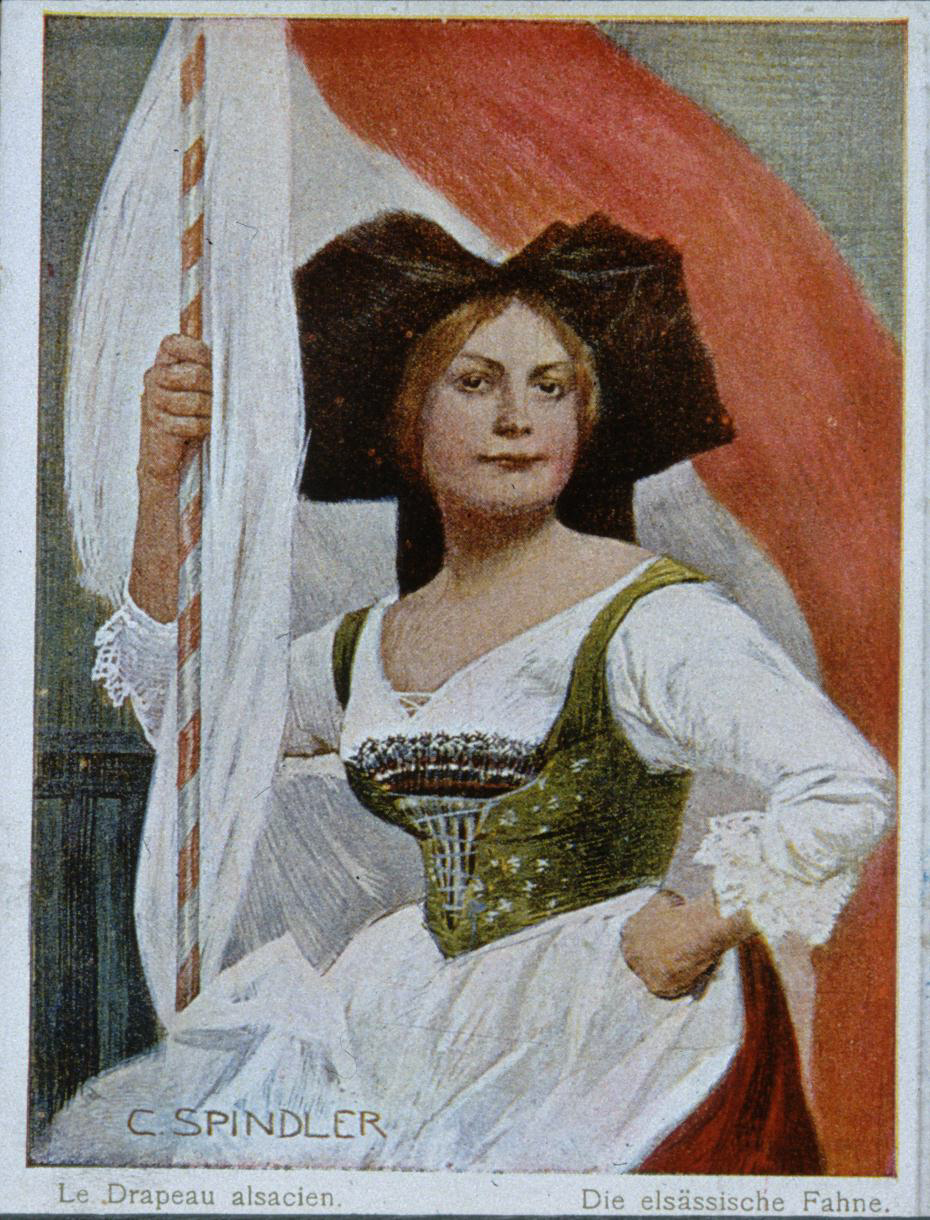
The flag of Alsace in illustration by Charles Spindler.

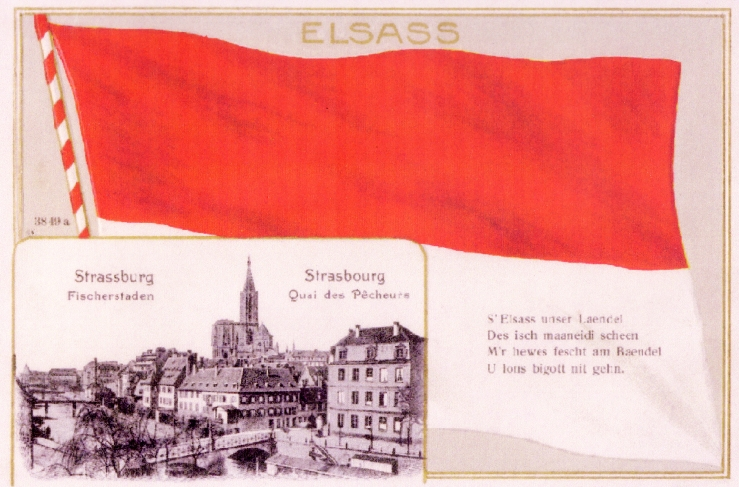
Bilingual postcard.

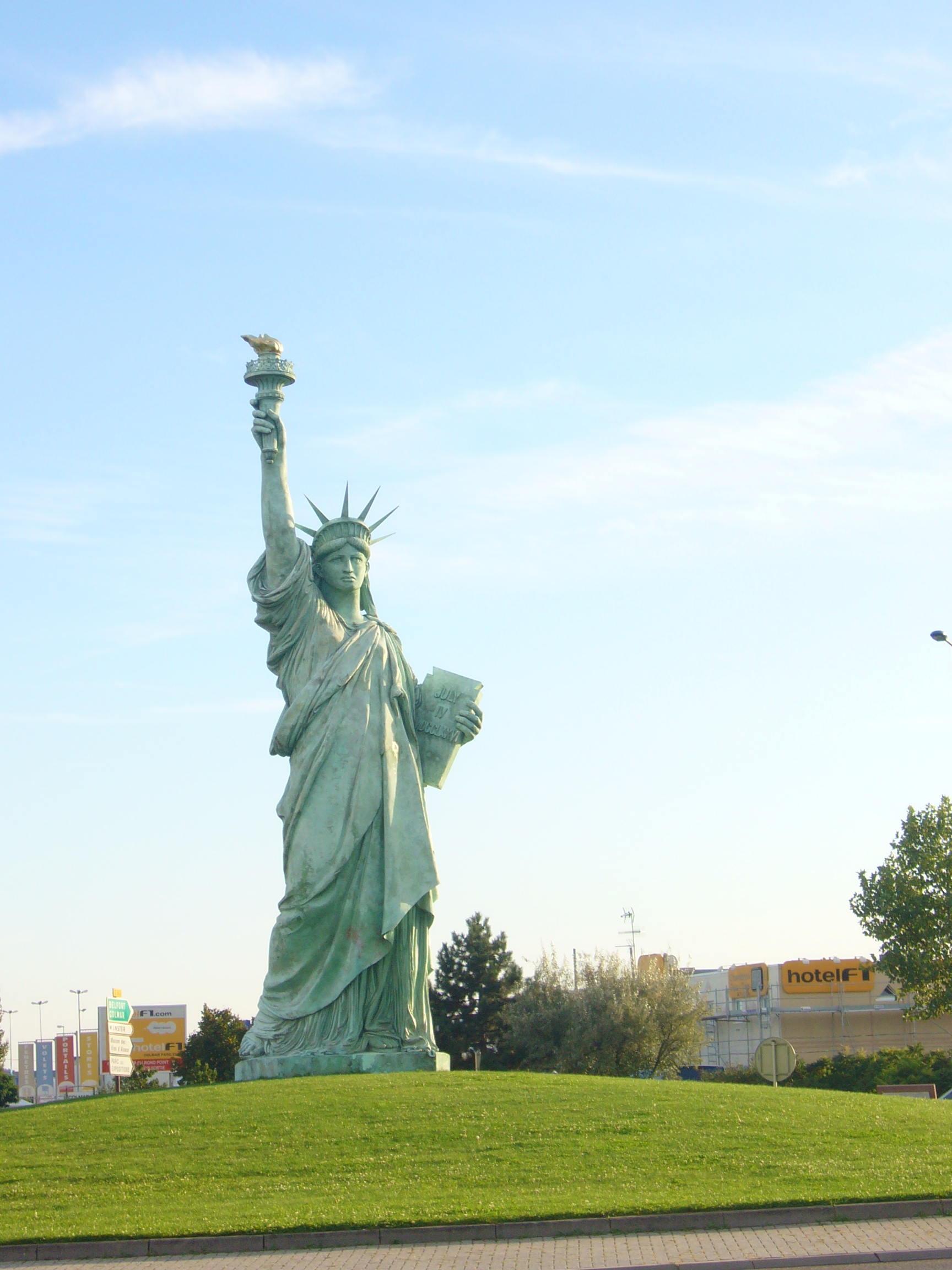
The replica of the Statue of Liberty in Colmar, the birth town of its sculptor Frédéric Auguste Bartholdi, has been a notable site of assembly of protests against the new French region Grand Est.

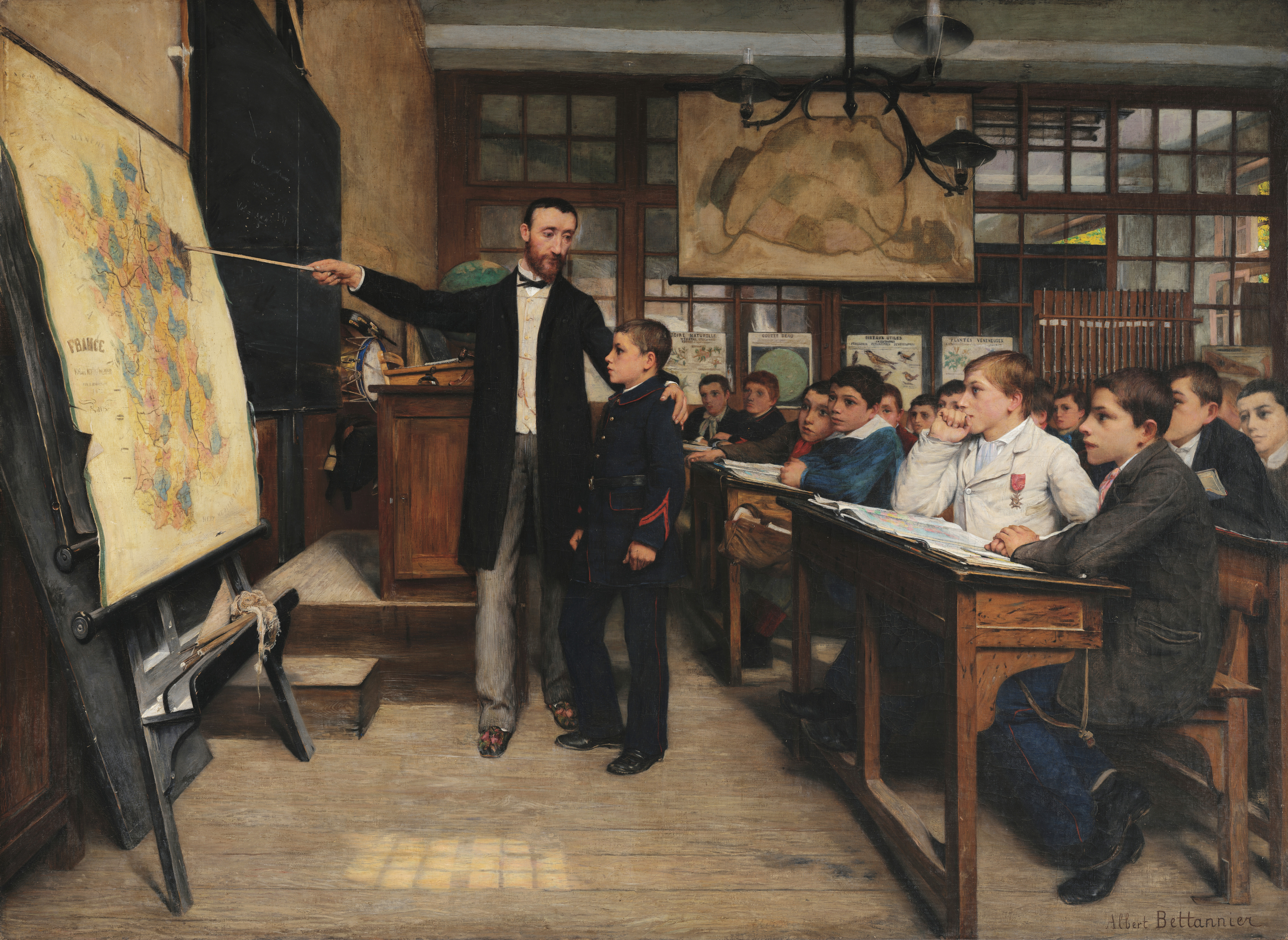
Alsace has been the subject of many conflicts. Here, a painting from 1887 depicting a child being taught about the "lost" province of Alsace-Lorraine in the aftermath of the Franco-Prussian War that is depicted in the colour black on a map of France.

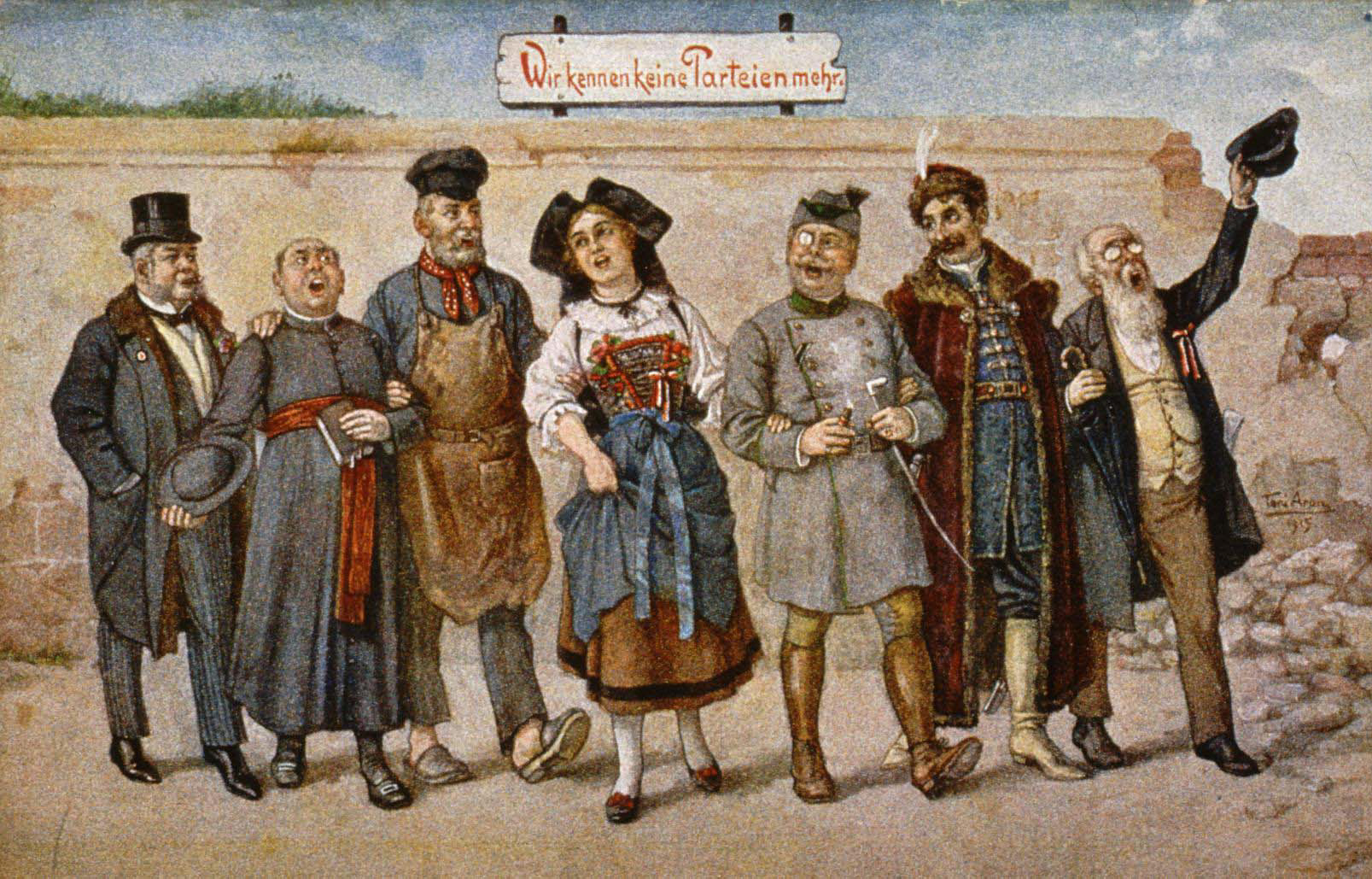
Alsatian postal card during World War I (1914–1918): "Wir kennen keine Parteien mehr" (German: "We don't know any parties anymore").

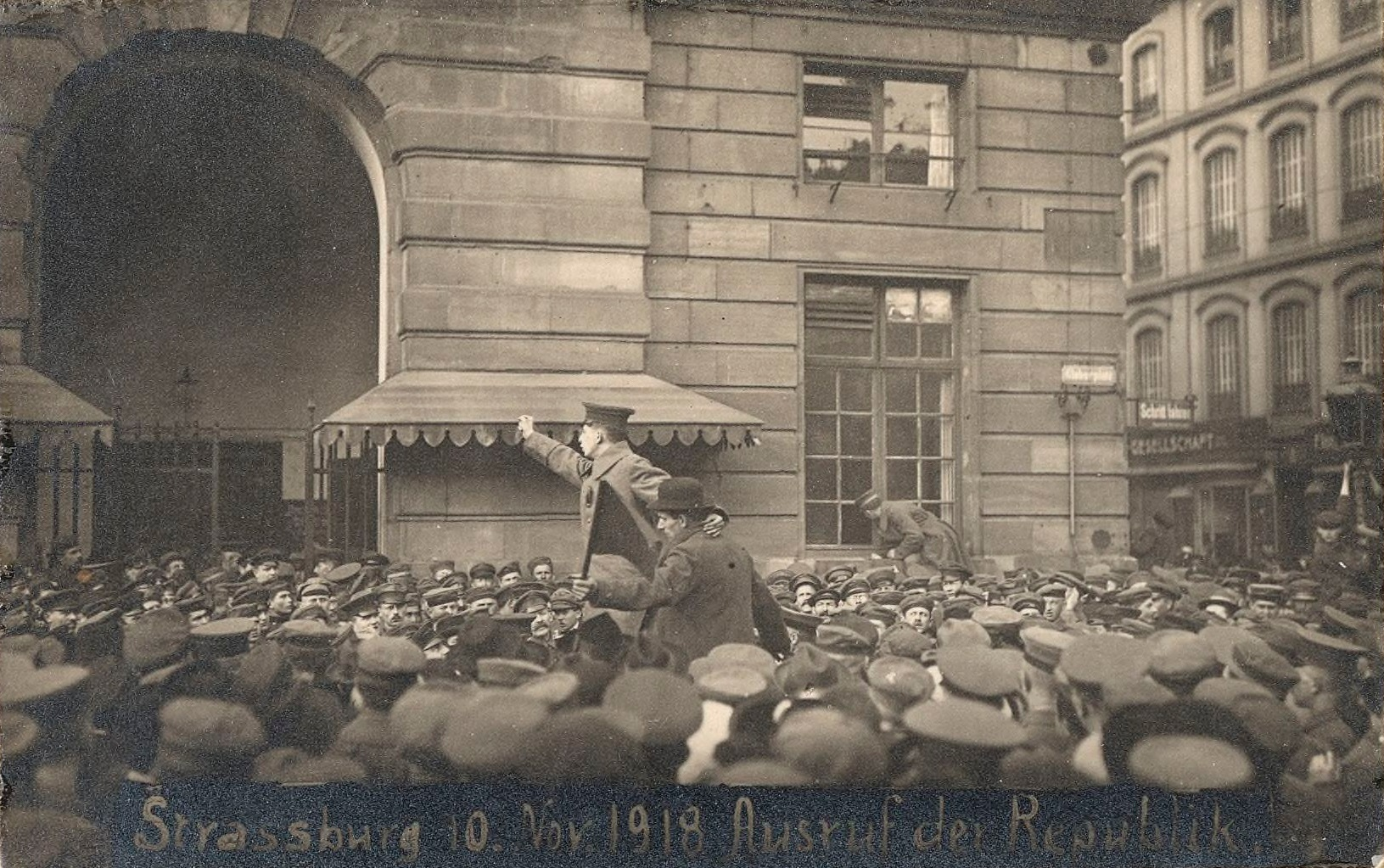
Ausruf der Republik - the proclamation of the Republic of Alsace on 10 November 1918 in Place Kléber, Strasbourg, during the tumultuous November 1918 in Alsace-Lorraine.

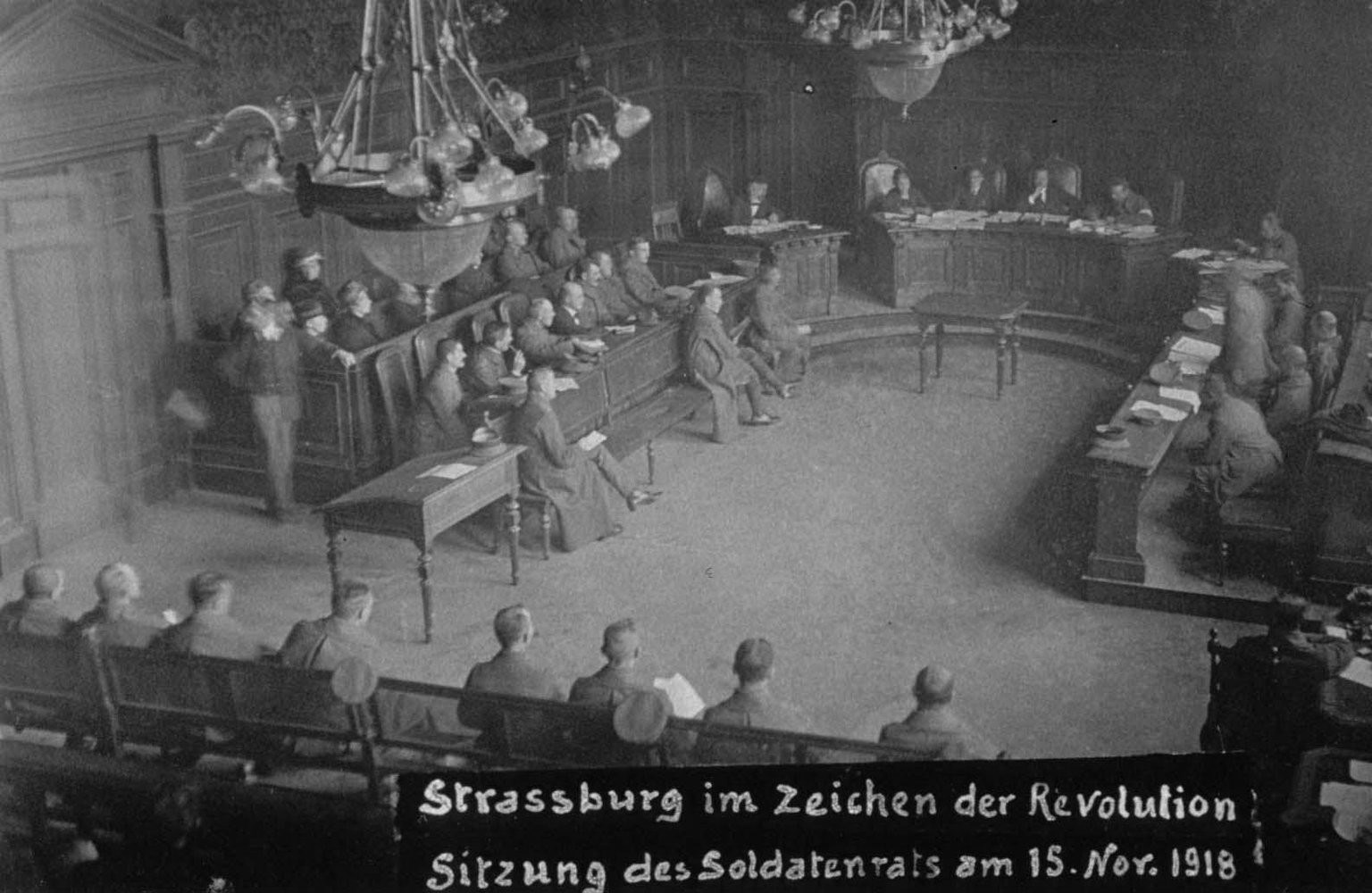
Military Council in Strasbourg, 15 November 1918.

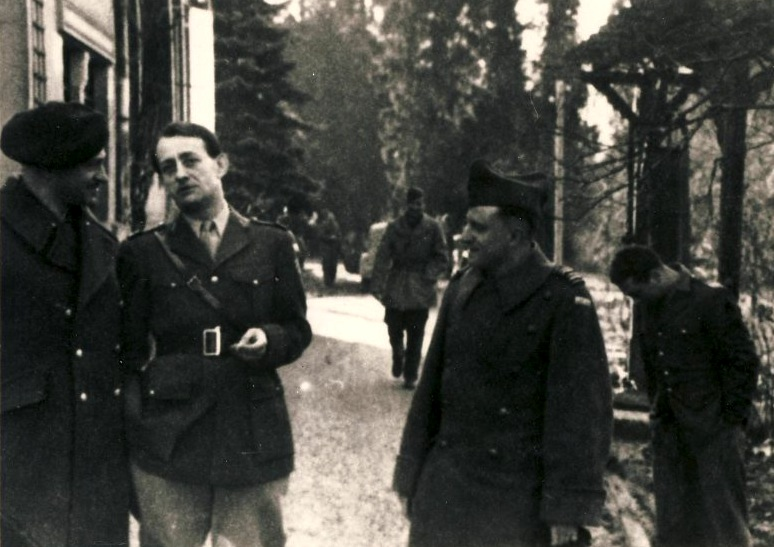
André Malraux (winter 1944–45) as Commander of the Alsace-Lorraine Independent Brigade (France), a unit that fought alongside regular French Army forces in World War II.

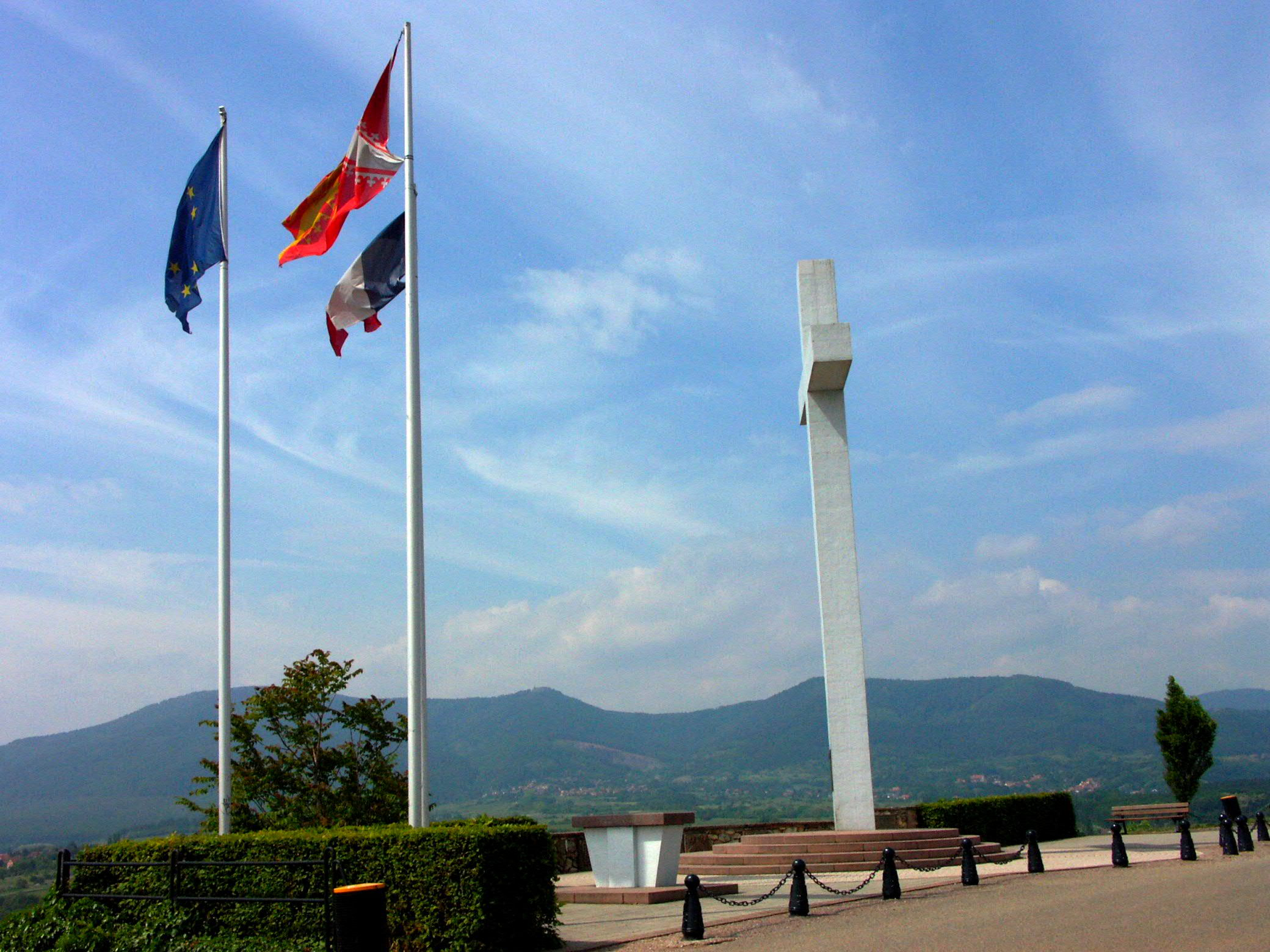
Monument in Obernai, Bas-Rhin, dedicated to the Malgré-nous (French: "Against our will"), soldiers who were involuntarily conscripted into the German Wehrmacht or Waffen-SS during World War II.

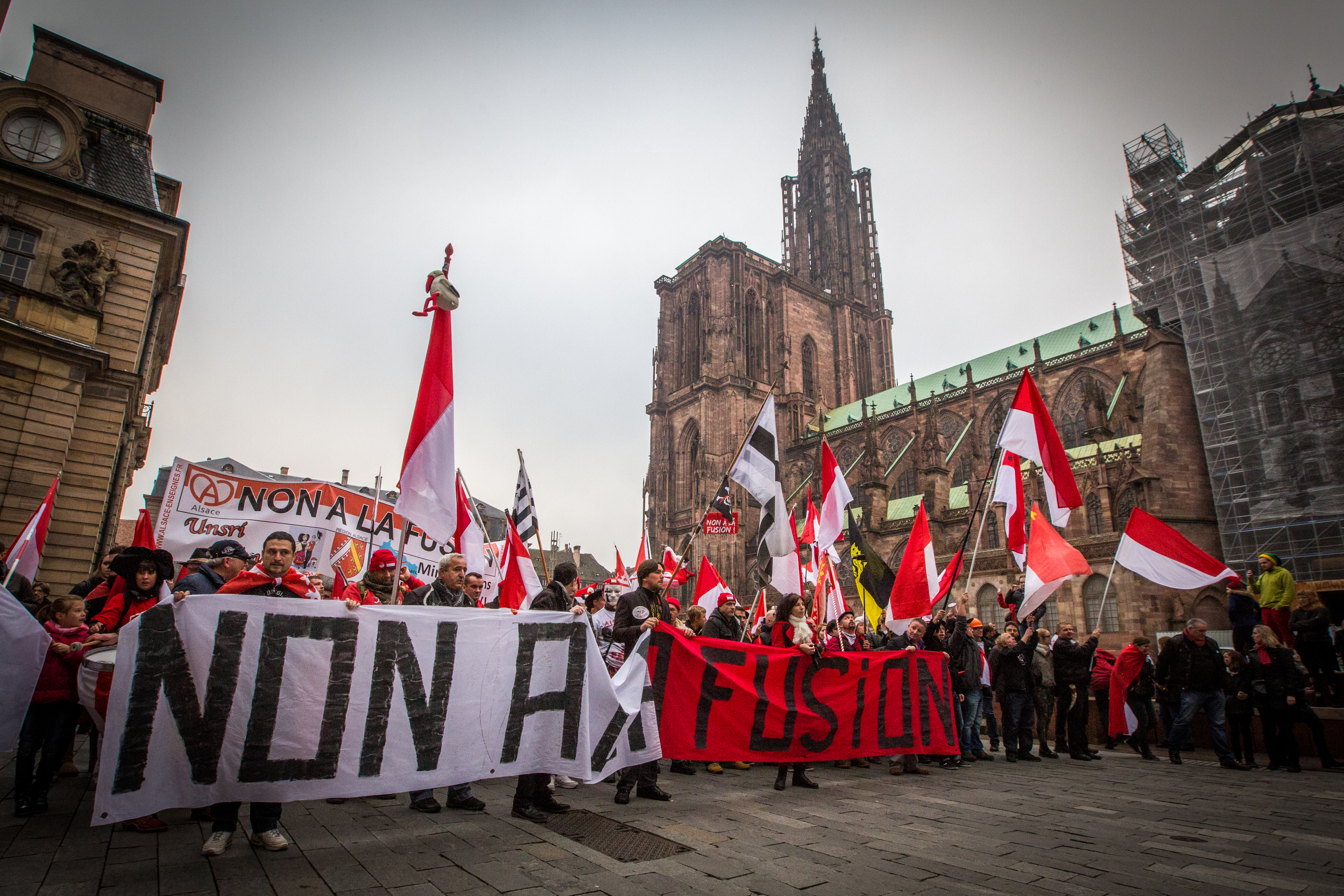
Protesters holding a banner saying "No to merger" (Non a la fusion) during a demonstration in November 2014 in Strasbourg, against the merger of Grand Est.

== See also ==
=== History ===
- es:Alsacia en 1789
- November 1918 in Alsace-Lorraine
- Alemannic separatism
- Grand Est#Opposition

=== Politics ===
- Alsace d'abord (fr:Espace nouveau jeune, fr:Jeune Alsace)
- Unser Land
- fr:Union du peuple alsacien
- fr:Fer's Elsass
- de:Nationalforum Elsass-Lothringen
- fr:Front culturel alsacien
- Popular Republican Union (part of Independents of Popular Action)
