= Bas-Rhin's 8th constituency =

Constituency of the National Assembly of France

8th constituency of the Bas-Rhin
- inline Constituency of the National Assembly of France

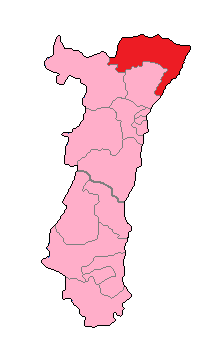
- Bas-Rhin's 8th Constituency shown within Alsace

- Bas-Rhin in France
- Deputy: Théo Bernhardt; RN
- Department: Bas-Rhin
- Cantons: Lauterbourg, Seltz, Soultz-sous-Forêts, Wissembourg, Wœrth, Niederbronn-les-Bains, Bischwiller (part)
- Registered voters: 92,744

The 8th constituency of the Bas-Rhin is a French legislative constituency in the Bas-Rhin département.

== Description ==
The 8th constituency of Bas-Rhin covers the Northernmost portion of the Departement, bordering (Germany) to both the east and north. It includes the small town of Wissembourg on the German border as well as the surrounding countryside.

It was a bastion of the conservative right from the inception of the Fifth Republic until 2022. It was won easily by the UMP in the first round of the 2012 election, with the National Front coming a distant second some 16,000 votes behind Frédéric Reiss. In the 2017 election, he easily beat the LREM candidate. However, in 2022, LR lost the seat to Horizons, part of Emmanuel Macron's centrist Ensemble Citoyens alliance.

== Historic representation ==
Election	Member	Party
1958	François Grussenmeyer	UNR
1962	François Grussenmeyer	UNR
1967	François Grussenmeyer	UDR
1968	François Grussenmeyer	UDR
1973	François Grussenmeyer	UDR
1978	François Grussenmeyer	RPR
1981	François Grussenmeyer	RPR
1986	Proportional representation – no election by constituency	
1988	François Grussenmeyer	RPR
1993	François Loos	UDF
1997	François Loos	UDF
2002	Frédéric Reiss	UMP
2007	Frédéric Reiss	UMP
2012	Frédéric Reiss	UMP
2017	Frédéric Reiss	LR
2022	Stéphanie Kochert	HOR
2024	Théo Bernhardt	RN

== Election results ==
=== 2024 ===
Legislative Election 2024: Bas-Rhin's 8th constituency
Party	Candidate	Votes	%	±%
DLF	Stella Batisse	576	0.97	N/A
DIV	Christian Klipfel	4,731	7.94	N/A
DVE	Claire Grosheitsch	739	1.24	−2.08
HOR (Ensemble)	Stéphanie Kochert	14,006	23.51	−1.08
LFI (NFP)	Myriam Zekagh	5,432	9.12	−0.74
LR	Victor Vogt	6,818	11.44	−10.55
LO	Catherine Gsell	306	0.51	N/A
RN	Théo Bernhardt	26,313	44.16	+17.88
REC	Nathan Keckenschmidt	663	1.11	−1.89
Turnout		59,584	97.89	+54.69
Registered electors		94,678		
2nd round result
RN	Théo Bernhardt	31,015	51.44	+8.08
HOR	Stéphanie Kochert	29,284	48.56	−7.98
Turnout		60,299	96.32	+54.46
Registered electors		94,700		
RN gain from HOR				

=== 2022 ===
Legislative Election 2022: Bas-Rhin's 8th constituency
Party	Candidate	Votes	%	±%
RN	Ludwig Knoepffler	10,527	26.28	+9.11
HOR (Ensemble)	Stéphanie Kochert	9,849	24.59	-8.39
LR (UDC)	Anne Sander	8,808	21.99	−8.21
LFI (NUPÉS)	Samy Ahmed-Yahia	3,951	9.86	+4.69
UL (REG)	Bruno Jacky	3,533	8.82	+1.08
DVE	Claire Grosheitsch	1,328	3.32	+1.54
REC	Sébastien Kriloff	1,200	3.00	N/A
Others	N/A	862	-	−
Turnout		40,058	43.20	−3.19
2nd round result
HOR (Ensemble)	Stéphanie Kochert	21,373	56.64	+15.52
RN	Ludwig Knoepffler	16,365	43.36	N/A
Turnout		37,738	41.86	−0.62
HOR gain from LR				

=== 2017 ===
Results of the 11 June and 18 June 2017 French National Assembly election in Bas-Rhin’s 8th Constituency
Candidate	Party		1st round		2nd round	
Candidate	Party		Votes	%	Votes	%
Christian Gliech	La République En Marche!	LREM	14,143	32.98	15,407	41.12
Frédéric Reiss	The Republicans	LR	12,954	30.20	22,063	58.88
Gérard Janus	National Front	FN	7,363	17.17		
Gaby Hartmann	Regionalist	REG	3,320	7.74		
Manuel Menetrier	La France Insoumise	FI	2,039	4.75		
Pierre-Henri Eisenschmidt	Debout la France	DLF	996	2.32		
Perrine Torrent	Ecologist	ECO	764	1.78		
Ambroise Perrin	Socialist Party	PS	520	1.21		
Daniel Fischer	Independent	DIV	228	0.53		
Gisèle Schneider	Ecologist	ECO	214	0.50		
Pascal Prevost-Boure	Communist Party	PCF	179	0.42		
Mehdi Benhlal	Far Left	EXG	167	0.39		
Total			42,887	100%	37,470	100%
Registered voters			94,590		94,499	
Blank/Void ballots			990	2.26%	2,671	6.65%
Turnout			43,877	46.39%	40,141	42.48%
Abstentions			50,713	53.61%	54,358	57.52%
Result					LR GAIN FROM UMP	

=== 2012 ===
Frédéric Reiss was elected with more than 50% of the vote in the first round of voting, and therefore no second round took place.

Results of the 10 June and 17 June 2012 French National Assembly election in Bas-Rhin’s 8th Constituency
Candidate	Party		1st round	
Candidate	Party		Votes	%
Frédéric Reiss	Union for a Popular Movement	UMP	26,380	53.64
Diana Garnier-Lang	National Front	FN	10,100	20.54
Nicole Habermacher	Socialist Party	PS	8,648	17.59
Alphonse Sibler	Ecologist	ECO	946	1.92
Séverine Charret	Left Front	FG	870	1.77
Perrine Torrent	Ecologist	ECO	812	1.65
Laure Ferrari	Miscellaneous Right	DVD	780	1.59
Pascal Ascheberg	Other	AUT	362	0.74
Catherine Gsell	Far Left	EXG	273	0.56
Catherine Bahl	Other	AUT	7	0.01
Total			49,178	100%
Registered voters			92,744	
Blank/Void ballots			1,006	2.00%
Turnout			50,184	54.11%
Abstentions			42,560	45.89%
Result			UMP HOLD	

=== 2007 ===
Frédéric Reiss was elected with more than 50% of the vote in the first round of voting, and therefore no second round took place.

Results of the 10 June and 17 June 2007 French National Assembly election in Bas-Rhin’s 8th Constituency
Candidate	Party		1st round	
Candidate	Party		Votes	%
Frédéric Reiss	Union for a Popular Movement	UMP	25,260	65.91
Thomas Joerger	UDF-Democratic Movement	UDF-MoDem	3,488	9.10
Ambroise Perrin	Socialist Party	PS	3,339	8.71
Laurent Gnaedig	National Front	FN	2,765	7.21
Songul Kiraz	The Greens	LV	980	2.56
Héloïse Exbrayat	Ecologist	ECO	523	1.36
Danièle Canton	Far Left	EXG	469	1.22
Catherine Gsell	Far Left	EXG	432	1.13
Gabriel Bastain	Far Right	EXD	381	0.99
Christophe Bord	Miscellaneous Right	DVD	347	0.91
Jean-Philippe Martin	Independent	DIV	342	0.89
Total			38,326	100%
Registered voters			70,558	
Blank/Void ballots			993	2.53%
Turnout			39,319	55.73%
Abstentions			31,239	44.27%
Result			UMP HOLD	

=== 2002 ===
The UMP candidate was elected with more than 50% of the vote in the first round of voting, and therefore no second round took place.

Results of the 9 June and 16 June 2002 French National Assembly election in Bas-Rhin’s 8th Constituency
Candidate	Party		1st round	
Candidate	Party		Votes	%
Francois Loos	Union for a Presidential Majority	UMP	23,211	60.42
J. Marie Freund	National Front	FN	6,000	15.62
Pierre Mammosser	Socialist Party	PS	4,997	13.01
Stephane Reiss	The Greens	LV	1,443	3.76
Catherine Gsell	Workers’ Struggle	LO	579	1.51
Bruno Wolff	Regionalist	REG	562	1.46
H. Pierre Bapst	Ecologist	ECO	479	1.25
Colette Marchal	Ecologist	ECO	386	1.00
Catherine Wagner	Independent	DIV	311	0.81
Frederic Lemaire	Movement for France	MPF	284	0.74
Ralph Blindauer	Communist Party	PCF	162	0.42
Total			38,414	100%
Registered voters			68,063	
Blank/Void ballots			1,176	2.97%
Turnout			39,590	58.17%
Abstentions			28,473	41.83%
Result			UMP GAIN FROM UDF	
