= Bas-Rhin's 9th constituency =

Constituency of the National Assembly of France

9th constituency of the Bas-Rhin
- inline Constituency of the National Assembly of France

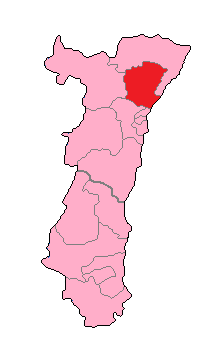
- Bas-Rhin's 9th Constituency shown within Alsace

- Bas-Rhin in France
- Deputy: Vincent Thiébaut; Horizons
- Department: Bas-Rhin
- Cantons: Haguenau, Brumath, Bischwiller(part)
- Registered voters: 88,325

The 9th constituency of the Bas-Rhin is a French legislative constituency in the Bas-Rhin département.

== Description ==
The 9th constituency of Bas-Rhin covers the area north of Strasbourg around the large town of Haguenau.

In common with much of Alsace outside Strasbourg and Mulhouse the constituency has been held by conservative parties for all of the Fifth Republic. All three cantons that make up the constituency are currently held by the UMP. The constituency was held by former Prime Minister of France Pierre Pflimlin during the 1950s & 1960s.

From 2012 until 2017, the seat was held by Claude Sturni, Mayor of Haguenau, having defeated the official UMP candidate in the second round of the 2012 election.

== Historic Representation ==
Election	Member	Party
1958	Pierre Pflimlin	MRP
1962	Pierre Pflimlin	MRP
1967	Germain Sprauer	UNR
1968	Germain Sprauer	UDR
1973	Germain Sprauer	UDR
1978	Germain Sprauer	RPR
1981	Germain Sprauer	RPR
1986	Proportional representation - no election by constituency	
1988	Bernard Schreiner	RPR
1993	Bernard Schreiner	RPR
1997	Bernard Schreiner	RPR
2002	Bernard Schreiner	UMP
2007	François Loos	UMP
2012	Claude Sturni	DVD
2017	Vincent Thiébaut	LREM
2022	Vincent Thiébaut	HOR

== Election results ==
=== 2024 ===
Legislative Election 2024: Bas-Rhin's 9th constituency
Party	Candidate	Votes	%	±%
DIV	Philippe Pfrimmer	5,512	8.85	N/A
HOR (Ensemble)	Vincent Thiebaut	18,206	29.24	+0.72
LO	Yann Lucas	406	0.65	N/A
PS (NFP)	Olivier Terrien	9,680	15.55	N/A
RN	Marc Wolff	25,199	40.47	+18.51
REC	Robin Gerolt	678	1.09	−2.97
UL	Maurice Gluck	2,583	4.15	−2.45
Turnout		62,264	98.16	+54.33
Registered electors		96,216		
2nd round result
HOR	Vincent Thiébaut	34,046	54.06	−5.73
RN	Marc Wolff	28,930	45.94	+5.73
Turnout		62,976	96.62	+55.75
Registered electors		96,278		
HOR hold		Swing		

=== 2022 ===
Legislative Election 2022: Bas-Rhin's 9th constituency
Party	Candidate	Votes	%	±%
HOR (Ensemble)	Vincent Thiébaut	11,748	28.52	-7.46
RN	Laurent Gnaedig	9,043	21.96	+8.10
UDI (UDC)	Denis Riedinger	8,695	21.11	−6.45
LFI (NUPÉS)	Leilla Witzmann	6,030	14.64	+6.79
UL (REG)	Maurice Gluck	2,720	6.60	−0.79
REC	Stéphanie Altherr	1,673	4.06	N/A
Others	N/A	1,276	-	−
Turnout		41,185	43.83	−1.16
2nd round result
HOR (Ensemble)	Vincent Thiébaut	22,108	59.79	+8.76
RN	Laurent Gnaedig	14,868	40.21	N/A
Turnout		36,976	40.87	−1.94
HOR gain from LREM				

=== 2017 ===
Results of the 11 June and 18 June 2017 French National Assembly election in Bas-Rhin’s 9th Constituency
Candidate	Party		1st round		2nd round	
Candidate	Party		Votes	%	Votes	%
Vincent Thiebaut	La République En Marche!	LREM	14,745	35.98	17,209	51.03
Etienne Wolf	The Republicans	LR	9,527	23.25	16,513	48.97
Laurent Gnaedig	National Front	FN	5,679	13.86		
Jean-Luc Leber	Regionalist	REG	3,030	7.39		
Leilla Witzmann	La France Insoumise	FI	2,435	5.94		
Vanessa Wagner	Union of Democrats and Independents	UDI	1,765	4.31		
Françoise Werckmann	Ecologist	ECO	1,099	2.68		
Guillaume Bosshardt	Debout la France	DLF	708	1.73		
Hamid Filali	Socialist Party	PS	556	1.36		
Emmanuelle Lang	Far Right	EXD	361	0.88		
Jean-Marc Claus	Communist Party	PCF	226	0.55		
Tezcan Can	Independent	DIV	209	0.51		
Emmanuel Goepp	Independent	DIV	196	0.48		
Annelyse Jacquel	Far Left	EXG	167	0.41		
David Poilevey	Independent	DIV	158	0.39		
Jean-Michel Delaye	Far Left	EXG	118	0.29		
Total			40,979	100%	33,722	100%
Registered voters			92,695		92,729	
Blank/Void ballots			722	1.74%	2,375	6.58%
Turnout			41,701	44.99%	36,097	38.93%
Abstentions			50,994	55.01%	56,632	61.07%
Result					LREM GAIN FROM DVD	

=== 2012 ===
Results of the 10 June and 17 June 2012 French National Assembly election in Bas-Rhin’s 9th Constituency
Candidate	Party		1st round		2nd round	
Candidate	Party		Votes	%	Votes	%
Claude Sturni	Miscellaneous Right	DVD	14,042	29.86	21,506	60.57
Nicole Thomas	Union for a Popular Movement	UMP	11,906	25.32	14,002	39.43
Clarisse Chabod	Socialist Party	PS	9,196	19.56		
Jean-Claude Altherr	National Front	FN	8,437	17.94		
Françoise Werckmann	Ecologist	ECO	1,211	2.58		
Jean-Marc Claus	Left Front	FG	888	1.89		
François Ludwig	Other	AUT	467	0.99		
Arnaud Markert	Miscellaneous Right	DVD	447	0.95		
Jean-Michel Delaye	Far Left	EXG	229	0.49		
Georges Dizdarevic	Far Left	EXG	124	0.26		
Mounir Diari	Other	AUT	75	0.16		
Total			47,022	100%	35,508	100%
Registered voters			88,326		88,325	
Blank/Void ballots			691	1.45%	3,201	8.27%
Turnout			47,713	54.02%	38,709	43.83%
Abstentions			40,613	45.98%	49,616	56.17%
Result					DVD GAIN FROM UMP	

=== 2007 ===
François Loos was elected with more than 50% of the vote in the first round of voting, and therefore no second round took place.

Results of the 10 June and 17 June 2007 French National Assembly election in Bas-Rhin’s 9th Constituency
Candidate	Party		1st round	
Candidate	Party		Votes	%
François Loos	Union for a Popular Movement	UMP	32,011	56.55
Claude Kern	UDF-Democratic Movement	UDF-MoDem	10,853	19.17
Leilla Witzmann	Socialist Party	PS	4,675	8.26
Jean-Claude Altherr	National Front	FN	3,553	6.28
Robert Lindeckert	The Greens	LV	1,842	3.25
Marion Greib	Far Left	EXG	1,006	1.78
Christian Weinzorn	Ecologist	ECO	655	1.16
Jérôme Feuerstein	Movement for France	MPF	516	0.91
Christian Fischer	Far Right	EXD	487	0.86
Lydia Landeshaupt	Independent	DIV	463	0.82
Georges Dizdarevic	Far Left	EXG	404	0.71
Benoît Meyer	Independent	DIV	138	0.24
Total			56,603	100%
Registered voters			104,442	
Blank/Void ballots			1,112	1.93%
Turnout			57,715	55.26%
Abstentions			46,727	44.74%
Result			UMP HOLD	

=== 2002 ===
Results of the 9 June and 16 June 2002 French National Assembly election in Bas-Rhin’s 9th Constituency
Candidate	Party		1st round		2nd round	
Candidate	Party		Votes	%	Votes	%
Bernard Schreiner	Union for a Presidential Majority	UMP	24,042	43.58	33,184	77.37
J. Claude Altherr	National Front	FN	7,821	14.18	9,704	22.63
Claude Kern	Union for French Democracy	UDF	7,421	13.45		
Leilla Witzmann	Socialist Party	PS	5,067	9.19		
Denis Garcia	Miscellaneous Left	DVG	2,390	4.33		
Isabelle Jensen	The Greens	LV	2,101	3.81		
Michele Leiser	National Republican Movement	MNR	1,594	2.89		
Sylvie Freysz	Independent	DIV	1,451	2.63		
J. Daniel Gillig	Republican Pole	PR	866	1.57		
Marc Baud-Berthier	Workers’ Struggle	LO	584	1.06		
Catherine Bitterlin	Ecologist	ECO	426	0.77		
Jocelyne Blanchard	Movement for France	MPF	418	0.76		
Murat Gunay	Communist Party	PCF	368	0.67		
Damien Bresse-Falk	Regionalist	REG	348	0.63		
Gil Neumann	Independent	DIV	148	0.27		
J. Benoit Meyer	Independent	DIV	120	0.22		
Total			55,165	100%	42,888	100%
Registered voters			97,767		97,787	
Blank/Void ballots			1,323	2.34%	3,054	6.65%
Turnout			56,488	57.78%	45,942	46.98%
Abstentions			41,279	42.22%	51,845	53.02%
Result					UMP GAIN FROM RPR	

== Sources ==
Official results of French elections from 2002: "Résultats électoraux officiels en France" (in French).
