= Alsace First =

Alsace First Elsass Zuerst Alsace d'abord
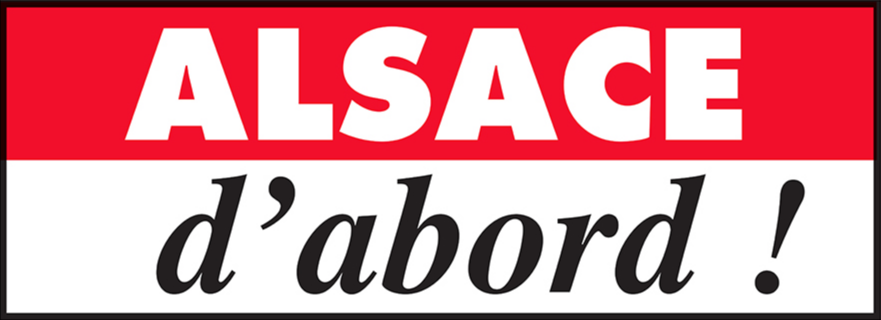
- President: Jacques Cordonnier
- Founded: 1989; 37 years ago
- Split from: National Rally
- Headquarters: Strasbourg, Alsace, France
- Ideology: Regionalism; Alsatian autonomism National conservatism Identitarianism
- Political position: Far-right
- Colours: Red, white Brown (customary)
- National Assembly: 0 / 577
- Senate: 0 / 348
- European Parliament: 0 / 74

Alsace First (Alemannic German: Elsass Zuerst, EZ; French: Alsace d'abord, ADA), formerly the Alsatian Regionalist Movement (French: Mouvement régionaliste alsacien) from 1998 to 2002, is a political party based in Alsace, France, established in 1989. It promotes autonomy for Alsace in France.

The party is considered far-right by many observers due to its strong stance against immigration, its opposition to Turkish entry into the European Union and its affirmation of an Alsatian national identity. The party is opposed to French centralizing Jacobin attitudes and favours decentralization, fiscal and political autonomy for Alsace, and bilingualism in the region (Alsatian and French). It is often compared to the stronger Lega Nord in Italy.

In the 2004 French regional elections, the party won 9.42% of the vote but failed to win seats. It had 9 seats in the Alsace regional council from 1998 to 2004 due to an electoral system more favourable to smaller parties than the current system, adopted in 2003. The party has one seat in the Haut-Rhin general council, held by Christian Chaton in the canton of Sainte-Marie-aux-Mines.

The leader of ADA is Jacques Cordonnier, who replaced Robert Spieler in 2008. Spieler had been a National Front deputy in the French National Assembly between 1986 and 1988.

== Electoral results ==
=== Legislative elections ===
In the 2017 legislative elections, the party put forward two candidates. Jacques Cordonnier ran in the 4th constituency of Bas-Rhin, the so-called "Strasbourg-Campaign" while Catherine Dahmane ran in Sundgau. The candidates ran on the withdrawal of Alsace from the Grand Est administrative region, the merging of the council areas of Bas-Rhin and Haut-Rhin, the preservation of local law, an increased decentralisation of the education system, the promotion of French-German bilingualism, the cancellation of the construction of the GCO motorway and the preservation of the free use of the A35.

Constituency	Candidate	Vote	%
Bas-Rhin 4th	Jacques Cordonnier	1 039	2.26
Haut-Rhin 3rd	Catherine Dahmane	1 046	2.68

=== Senate elections ===
During the 2014 senatorial elections, Alsace First allied itself with other regionalists, under the banner: 'Alsace, a common passion'. In the Bas-Rhin region, Denis Lieb received 25 votes, or 0.95% of the vote, while in the Haut-Rhin region, Jacques Cordonnier received 16 votes, or 0.84% of the vote. The coalition did not obtain any elected representatives.

=== European elections ===
Alsace First has never participated in the European elections.

=== Regional elections ===
Regional election results
Year	Votes	%	Mandate	Ranking
1992	41 398	6.05	2 / 47	6th
1998	35 621	6.16	3 / 47	5th
2004	62 259	9.42	0 / 47	4th
2010	25 906	4.98	0 / 47	5th

Score and number of seats obtained in the Alsace regional elections:

- 1992–1998: 6%, 2 seats
- 1998–2004: 5.9%, 9 seats (3 seats after the election, loss of one representative and rallying of 7 regional councillors from MNR).

=== Canton and regional elections ===
Since 2009, Alsace First has not had any elected representatives, after the defection of their vice-president, Christian Chaton, general councillor for Sainte-Marie-aux-Mines (Haut-Rhin) since 2004, re-elected in 2011 as a member of UMP.

In the canton elections of 20 and 27 March 2011, the movement only ran 2 candidates (it ran 32 at the canton elections in 2004). They both ran in the Bas-Rhin region:

- Jacques Cordonnier, Strasbourg canton 6: received 6.40% of the vote.
- Karl Goschescheck, Illkirch-Graffenstaden canton: received 4.27% of the vote.

The latter, during the campaign, made controversial comments in an interview with a regional newspaper.

In the 2015 regional elections, the party ran a duo in the Bas-Rhin region.

Canton	Candidates	Vote	%
Strasbourg-6	Jacques Cordonnier Renée Kuss	611	5.50

=== Municipal elections ===
The regionalist movement lost its municipal councillors in Strasbourg in 2001.

== Young Alsace ==
Young Alsace is a youth movement related to Alsace First. It is a far-right and regionalist movement; some of its members are also part of the Groupe union défense (GUD).

== See also ==
- Unser Land
- Alemannic separatism
- List of political parties in France
