= Théo Bernhardt =

French politician (born 2000)

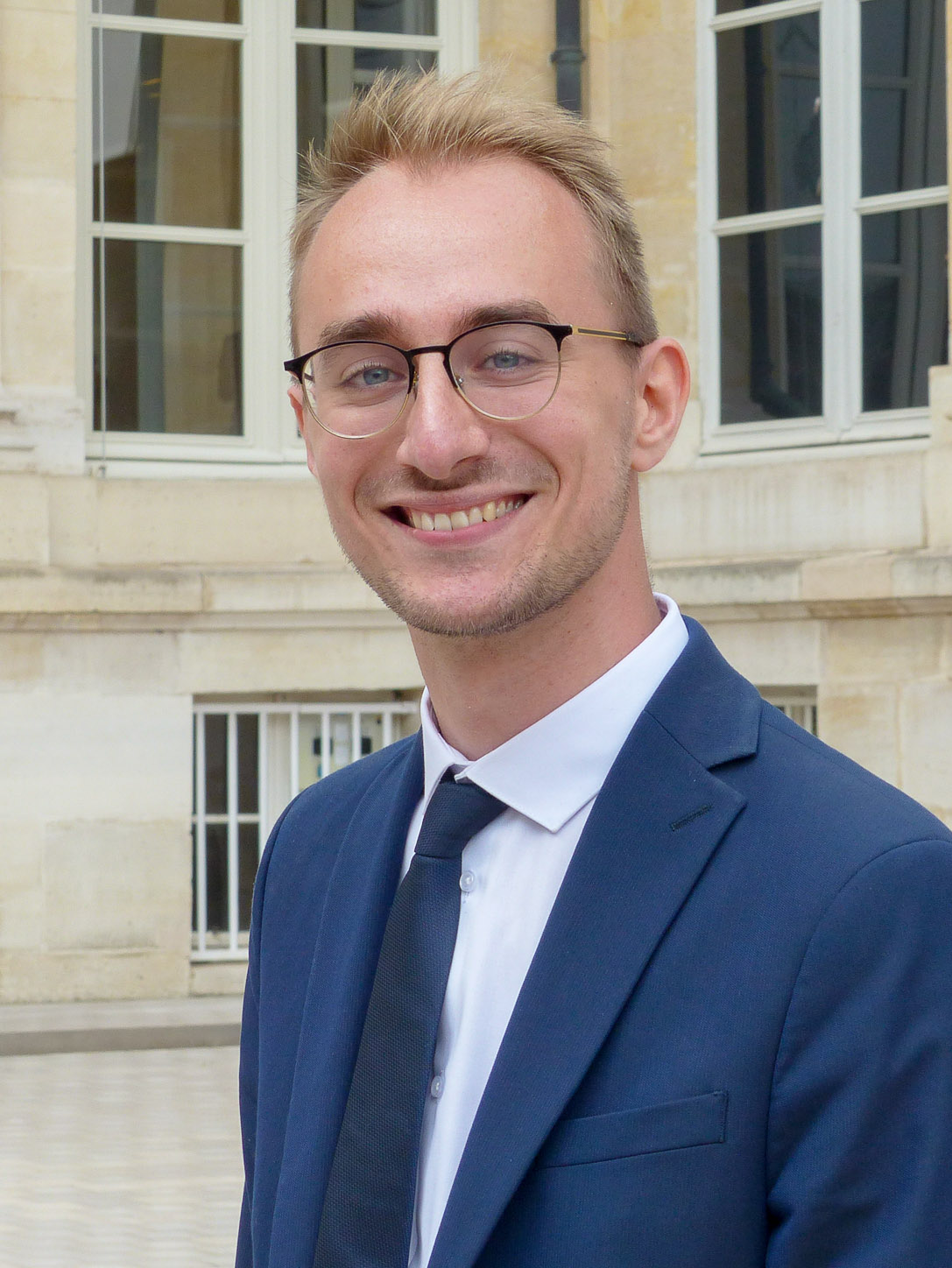

Member of the French National Assembly for Bas-Rhin's 8th constituency
- Incumbent
- Assumed office 18 July 2024
- Preceded by: Stéphanie Kochert

Personal details
- Born: 29 June 2000 (age 26) Angers, France
- Education: IUT Louis Pasteur

Théo Bernhardt (born 29 June 2000) is a French politician of the National Rally. He was elected member of the National Assembly for Bas-Rhin's 8th constituency in 2024.

== Early life and career ==
Bernhardt was born in Angers to Alsatian parents. He graduated from IUT Louis Pasteur in Schiltigheim with a master's degree in biomedical research. He joined the National Rally at the age of 18, and was a substitute candidate for Bas-Rhin's 3rd constituency in the 2022 legislative election.

== Biography ==
Théo Bernhardt was born to parents from Alsace. He completed a master's degree in biomedical research at the Louis Pasteur University Institute of Technology in Schiltigheim, graduating shortly before his election in 2024.

In 2020, he appeared on the television shows Les Douze Coups de midi and Tout le monde veut prendre sa place.

He began campaigning for the National Rally at the age of 18, highlighting “Marine Le Pen social conscience.” In the 2022 legislative elections, he was a deputy in the third district of Bas-Rhin.

After Emmanuel Macron dissolved the National Assembly on June 9, 2024, he was nominated by the National Rally as their candidate in the eighth district of Bas-Rhin. At the end of the first round on June 30, he came in first with 44.16% of the vote, qualifying him for the second round. On July 3, Rue89 highlighted the surprise of some of the residents and local elected officials in the constituency, which is known for “full employment and low crime rates.”

On July 7, 2024, Théo Bernhardt was elected Deputy (France) with 51.44% of the vote against the candidate and outgoing deputy Horizons Stéphanie Kochert.
