= Flag of Alsace =

- Rot un Wiss
- Adopted: 11th century
- Design: Red and white
- Designed by: Gérard d'Alsace, Duke of Lorraine
- The official flag of Alsace 2008–present

The flag of Alsace, known as the Red-and-White (Rot-un-Wiss in the Alsatian dialect), is the original red and white flag of the region, and can be traced to the red and white banner of Gerard, Duke of Lorraine in the 11th century.

Particularly since the introduction of new French region Grand Est, the traditional Rot un Wiss flag of Alsace has been widely promoted by the advocates of the Alsace autonomous movement.

== History ==
=== Rot un Wiss (from the 11th century) ===
The original flag of Alsace, the Rot un Wiss, dates back to the red and white banner of Gerard, Duke of Lorraine in the 11th century.

Red and white colours are commonly found on the coat of arms of Alsatian cities such as Strasbourg, Mulhouse and Sélestat, and additionally of many Swiss cities, especially in the region of Basel-Landschaft.

=== Departmental and regional flags ===
Perhaps as the Rot un Wiss marks the Germanic roots of Alsace, it was replaced in 1949 by a new flag, representing the union of the two départements of Haut-Rhin and Bas-Rhin, however without real historical relevance. It was subsequently modified to a slightly different appearance, yet also representing the two departments. The flag is currently used by the European Collectivity of Alsace created in January 2021.

Prince-Bishopric of Strasbourg (982–1803)

Imperial Territory of Alsace-Lorraine (1871–1918)

Unofficial flag of Alsace from the beginning of the 20th century, used by supporters of increasing autonomy.

Alsace-Lorraine Soviet Republic, red flag (1918)

The official flag of Alsace 1949–2008, representing the two départements of Haut-Rhin and Bas-Rhin

The official flag of Alsace 2008–present

Flag of the former Region of Alsace 2011–2016

Official logo of the European Collectivity of Alsace 2021–present

== Recognition ==
There is controversy around the recognition of the Alsatian flag.

With the purpose of "Francosizing" the region, the Rot un Wiss has not been recognised by the French government. Some French politicians have erroneously called this a "Nazi invention" — while the Rot un Wiss is still known as the real historical emblem of the region by most of the population and the departments' parliaments.

Subsequently, the Rot un Wiss has been widely used during protests against the creation of a new "super-region" Grand Est, gathering Champagne-Ardennes, Lorraine and Alsace, namely on Colmar's statue of liberty.

== See also ==
- Coat of arms of Alsace
