= Frédéric Reiss =

French politician

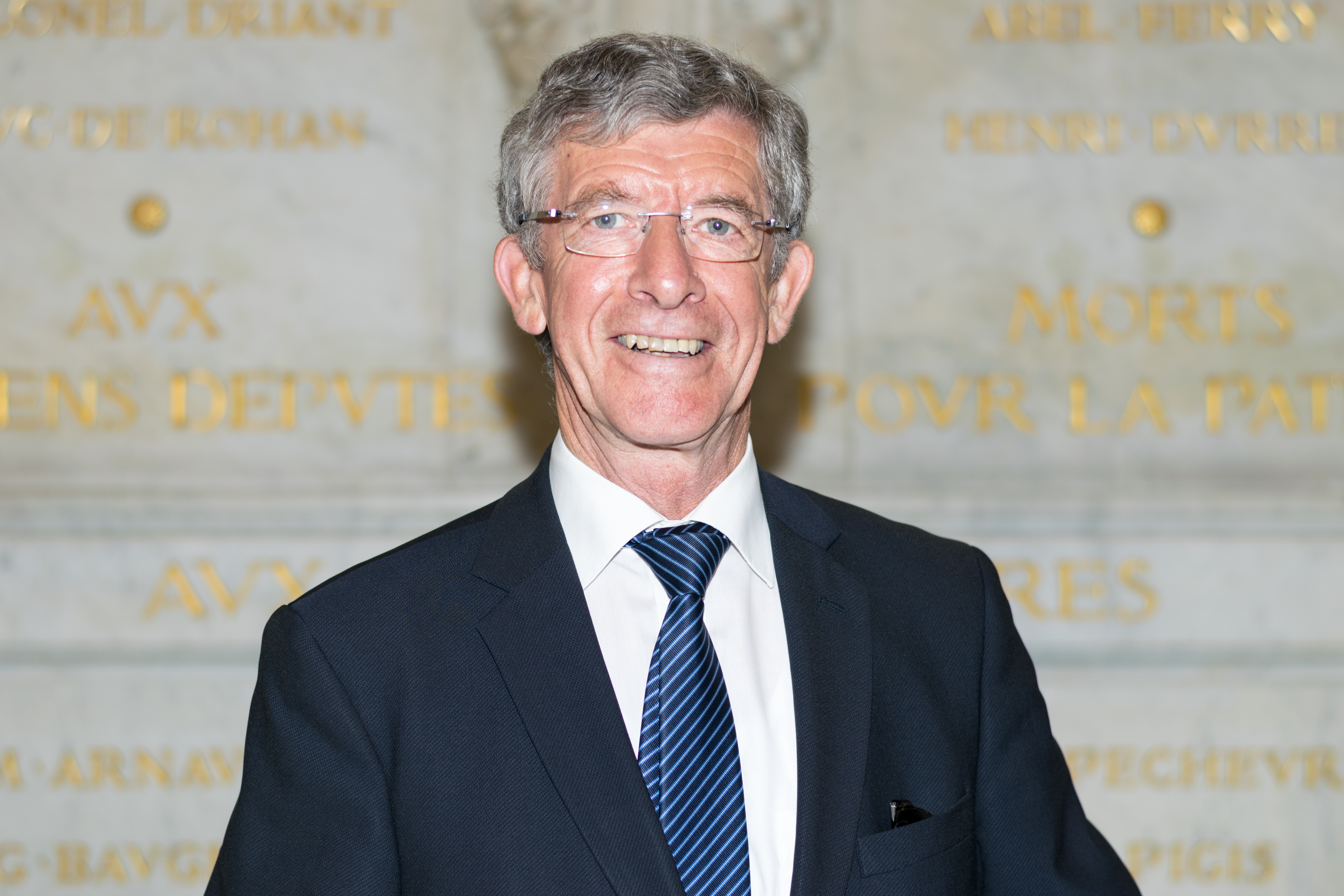

Member of the National Assembly for Bas-Rhin's 8th constituency
- In office 17 June 2002 – 21 June 2022
- Preceded by: François Loos
- Succeeded by: Stéphanie Kochert

Personal details
- Born: 12 November 1949 (age 76) Haguenau, France
- Party: The Republicans
- Profession: Teacher

Frédéric Reiss (French pronunciation: [fʁedeʁik ʁais]; born 12 November 1949) is a French teacher and politician of the Republicans who has been serving as a member of the National Assembly of France since the 2002 elections, representing the Bas-Rhin department. On the local level, he is the mayor of Niederbronn-les-Bains, Bas-Rhin.

== Political career ==
In parliament, Reiss has been serving on the Committee on Cultural Affairs and Education since 2002. In this capacity, he was the parliament's rapporteur on the national budget for research in 2020.

In addition to his committee assignments, Reiss is part of the French-Moldovan Parliamentary Friendship Group. In 2019, he also joined the Franco-German Parliamentary Assembly.

== Other activities ==
- Franco-German Youth Office, Member of the Board of Directors

== Political positions ==
Ahead of the 2017 elections, Reiss endorsed François Fillon as the Republican's candidate for president. Ahead of the 2022 presidential elections, he publicly declared his support for Michel Barnier as the Republicans' candidate. He did not seek re-election in the 2022 French legislative election.
