= Bas-Rhin's 4th constituency =

Constituency of the National Assembly of France

4th constituency of the Bas-Rhin
- inline Constituency of the National Assembly of France

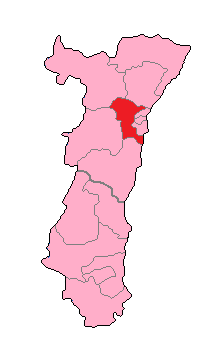
- Bas-Rhin's 4th Constituency shown within Alsace

- Bas-Rhin in France
- Deputy: Françoise Buffet; RE
- Department: Bas-Rhin
- Cantons: Geispolsheim, Mundolsheim (part), Truchtersheim, Illkirch-Graffenstaden (Part)
- Registered voters: 89,926

The 4th constituency of the Bas-Rhin is a French legislative constituency in the Bas-Rhin département.

== Description ==
This constituency spreads west from Strasbourg and includes several small commuter towns such as Geispolsheim and Lingolsheim. It also contains Strasbourg International Airport within its borders.

The seat had been dominated by parties of the right throughout the 5th Republic until 2017, electing representatives from both Gaullist and non-Gaullist parties.

== Historic representation ==
Election	Member	Party
1958	Étienne Lux	MRP
1962	Georges Ritter	CNIP
1967	Georges Ritter	UNR
1968	Georges Ritter	UNR
1973	Jean-Claude Burckel	UDR
1978	André Durr	RPR
1981	André Durr	RPR
1986	Proportional representation – no election by constituency	
1988	André Durr	RPR
1993	André Durr	RPR
1995	Yves Burr	UDF
1997	Yves Burr	UDF
2002	Yves Burr	UMP
2007	Yves Burr	UMP
2012	Sophie Rohfritsch	UMP
2017	Martine Wonner	LREM
2020	Martine Wonner	EDS
2020	Martine Wonner	LIOT
2021	Martine Wonner	NI
2022	Françoise Buffet	RE

== Election results ==
=== 2024 ===
Legislative Election 2024: Bas-Rhin's 4th constituency
Party	Candidate	Votes	%	±%
DIV	Catherine Berthol	2,389	3.50	N/A
LFI (NFP)	Raphaële Krattinger	14,297	20.92	+3.77
LR	Nelly Aeschelmann	3,936	5.76	−8.99
LO	Mehdi Benhlal	344	0.50	N/A
RN	Delphine Daubenberger	22,625	33.11	+16.01
REC	Jean-Louis Bigot	645	0.94	−3.07
RE (Ensemble)	Françoise Buffet	22,107	32.36	+0.98
UL	Bénédicte Matz	1,982	2.90	−1.24
Turnout		68,325	98.19	+50.07
Registered electors		99,049		
2nd round result
RE	Françoise Buffet	41,629	61.44	+29.08
RN	Delphine Daubenberger	26,130	38.56	+5.45
Turnout		67,759	96.04	+51.15
Registered electors		99,066		
RE hold		Swing		

=== 2022 ===
Legislative Election 2022: Bas-Rhin's 4th constituency
Party	Candidate	Votes	%	±%
LREM (Ensemble)	Françoise Buffet	14,554	31.38	-10.14
LFI (NUPÉS)	Imane Lahmeur	7,952	17.15	+5.94
RN	Virginie Joron	7,931	17.10	+6.41
LR (UDC)	Éric Amiet	6,838	14.75	−9.00
DIV	Martine Wonner*	2,494	5.38	N/A
UL (REG)	Bénédicte Matz	1,920	4.14	−0.22
REC	Virginie Beck	1,858	4.01	N/A
DVE	Clément Behr	1,607	3.47	N/A
Others	N/A	1,220	-	−
Turnout		46,374	48.12	−1.28
2nd round result
LREM (Ensemble)	Françoise Buffet	26,856	66.06	+10.20
LFI (NUPÉS)	Imane Lahmeur	13,795	33.94	N/A
Turnout		40,651	44.89	+2.76
LREM hold				

* Martine Wonner was the LREM candidate in the previous election. Her 2017 results are counted in the LREM scores for swing calculations.

=== 2017 ===
Results of the 11 June and 18 June 2017 French National Assembly election in Bas-Rhin’s 4th Constituency
Candidate	Party		1st round		2nd round	
Candidate	Party		Votes	%	Votes	%
Martine Wonner	La République En Marche!	LREM	19,127	41.52	20,842	55.86
Sophie Rohfritsch	The Republicans	LR	10,941	23.75	16,471	44.14
Thibault Manteaux	National Front	FN	4,926	10.69		
Albert Schwartz	La France Insoumise	FI	3,237	7.03		
Morgane Keck	Regionalist	REG	2,009	4.36		
Nathalie Palmier	Ecologist	ECO	1,685	3.66		
Jacques Cordonnier	Far Right	EXD	1,039	2.26		
Thibaut Vinci	Radical Party of the Left	PRG	845	1.83		
Michèle Tremolieres	Ecologist	ECO	674	1.46		
Eric Mouy	Debout la France	DLF	659	1.43		
Alexandra Brasleret	Independent	DIV	296	0.64		
Yasmina Chadli	Communist Party	PCF	239	0.52		
Patrick Arbogast	Independent	DIV	168	0.36		
Marc Baud-Berthier	Far Left	EXG	139	0.30		
Mathieu Le Tallec	Far Left	EXG	81	0.18		
Total			46,065	100%	37,313	100%
Registered voters			94,513		94,490	
Blank/Void ballots			626	1.34%	2,494	6.47%
Turnout			46,691	49.40%	39,807	42.13%
Abstentions			47,822	50.60%	54,683	57.87%
Result					LREM GAIN FROM LR	

=== 2012 ===
Results of the 10 June and 17 June 2012 French National Assembly election in Bas-Rhin’s 4th Constituency
Candidate	Party		1st round		2nd round	
Candidate	Party		Votes	%	Votes	%
Sophie Rohfritsch	Union for a Presidential Majority	UMP	21,951	43.94	29,154	65.05
Nadine Soccio	Socialist Party	PS	11,646	23.31	15,665	34.95
Pascale Elles	National Front	FN	7,987	15.99		
Luc Huber	Europe Ecology - The Greens	EELV	2,347	4.70		
Danielle Meyer-Traber	Centrist Alliance	AC	1,510	3.02		
Julien Ratcliffe	Left Front	FG	1,117	2.24		
Frédéric Le Jehan	The Centre for France	CEN	818	1.64		
Jacques Barthel	Miscellaneous Right	DVD	641	1.28		
Agnès Hirzel	Ecologist	ECO	591	1.18		
Emmanuel Leroy	Other	AUT	394	0.79		
Jean-Philippe Martin	Ecologist	ECO	340	0.68		
Marie Gabrielle Lucas	Miscellaneous Right	DVD	314	0.63		
Valérie Acker	Far Left	EXG	171	0.34		
Marc Baud-Berthier	Far Left	EXG	131	0.26		
Total			49,958	100%	44,819	100%
Registered voters			89,933		89,926	
Blank/Void ballots			629	1.24%	1,323	2.87%
Turnout			50,587	56.25%	46,142	51.31%
Abstentions			39,346	43.75%	43,784	48.69%
Result					UMP HOLD	

=== 2007 ===
Yves Bur was elected with more than 50% of the vote in the first round of voting, and therefore no second round took place.

Results of the 10 June and 17 June 2007 French National Assembly election in Bas-Rhin’s 4th Constituency
Candidate	Party		1st round	
Candidate	Party		Votes	%
Yves Bur	Union for a Presidential Majority	UMP	36,365	56.84
Claude Froehly	Socialist Party	PS	10,078	15.75
Anne Meunier	Democratic Movement	MoDem	7,123	11.13
Jacques Fernique	The Greens	LV	3,349	5.23
Marie Madeline Heitz	National Front	FN	3,235	5.06
Fabien Foesser	Ecologist	ECO	1,147	1.79
Michel Oswald	Far Left	EXG	927	1.45
Anthony Meckert	Independent	DIV	550	0.86
Frédéric Lalande	Far Right	EXD	459	0.72
Ariane Henry	Communist Party	PCF	381	0.60
Marc Baud-Berthier	Far Left	EXG	366	0.57
Total			63,980	100%
Registered voters			114,052	
Blank/Void ballots			957	1.47%
Turnout			64,937	56.94%
Abstentions			49,115	43.06%
Result			UMP HOLD	

=== 2002 ===
Yves Bur was elected with more than 50% of the vote in the first round of voting, and therefore no second round took place.

Results of the 9 June and 16 June 2002 French National Assembly election in Bas-Rhin’s 4th Constituency
Candidate	Party		1st round	
Candidate	Party		Votes	%
Yves Bur	Union for a Presidential Majority	UMP	36,140	57.48
Jacques Fernique	The Greens	LV	12,167	19.35
Marilene Heitz	National Front	FN	7,073	11.25
G. Pierre Noth	National Republican Movement	MNR	3,084	4.90
Martine Charbonnel	Ecologist	ECO	1,516	2.41
Jacqueline Berthon	Republican Pole	PR	977	1.55
Claude Kugler	Workers’ Struggle	LO	753	1.20
Rene Floureux	Movement for France	MPF	530	0.84
M. Olivier Gebuhrer	Communist Party	PCF	481	0.76
Karl Goscheschek	Regionalist	REG	155	0.25
Total			62,876	100%
Registered voters			106,733	
Blank/Void ballots			997	1.56%
Turnout			63,873	59.84%
Abstentions			42,860	40.16%
Result			UMP GAIN FROM UDF	
