= Martine Wonner =

French politician (born 1964)

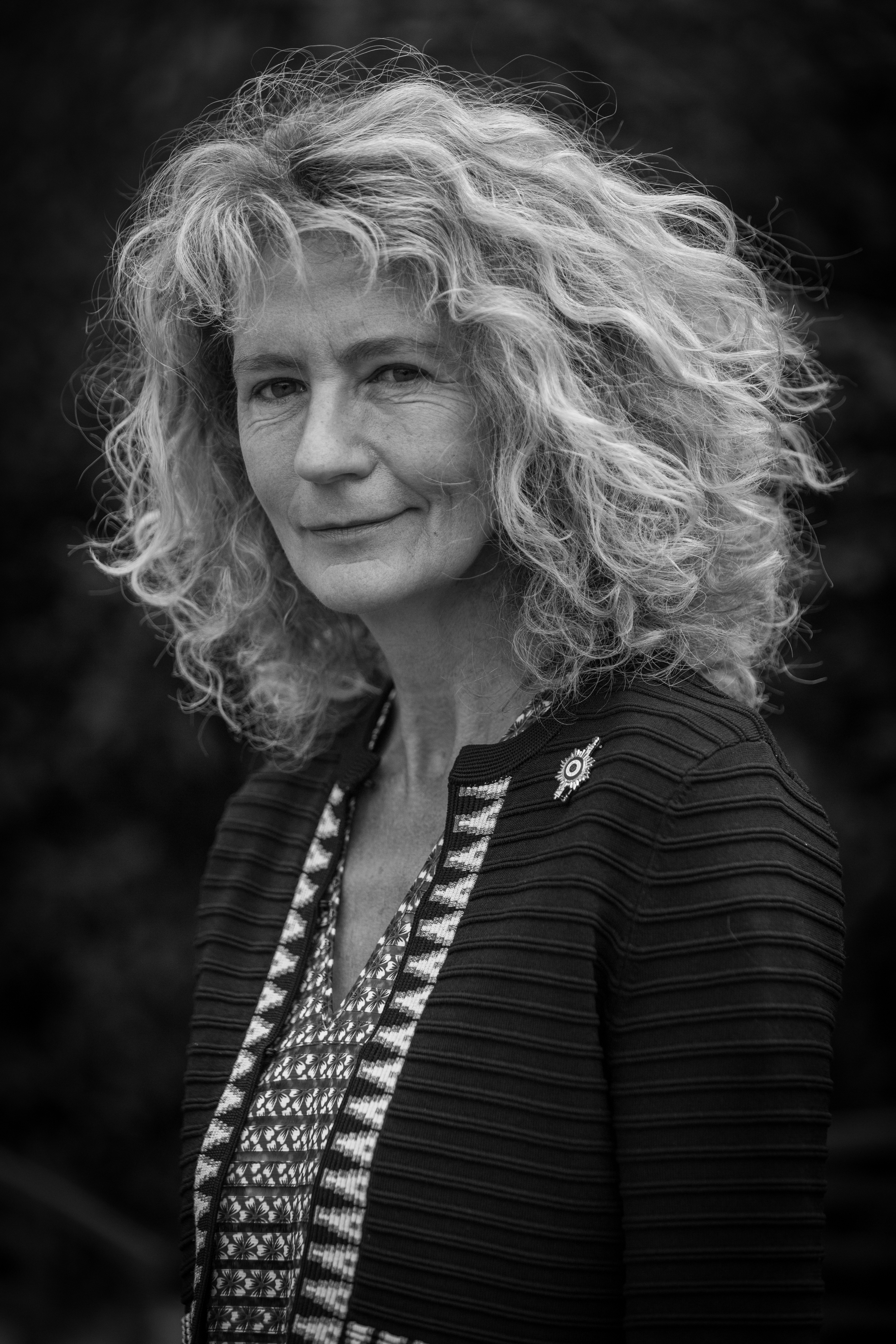

Member of the National Assembly for Bas-Rhin's 4th constituency
- In office 21 June 2017 – 21 June 2022
- Preceded by: Sophie Rohfritsch
- Succeeded by: Françoise Buffet

Personal details
- Born: 27 March 1964 (age 62) Hayange, France
- Party: La République En Marche! (2017–2020); Ecology Democracy Solidarity (2020)

Martine Wonner (born 27 March 1964) is a French psychiatrist and politician who served as a member of the French National Assembly from 2017 to 2022, representing the 4th constituency of the department of Bas-Rhin. She was elected as a member of La République En Marche! (LREM), but was expelled from the party in May 2020 and was one of the original 17 members of the new Ecology Democracy Solidarity group.

== Education and early career ==
Wonner graduated in psychiatric medicine from the University of Strasbourg. She began her career as a medical consultant for the Agence Régionale de l'Hospitalisation of Lorraine and Alsace and then joined the private group Ramsay Générale de Santé in 2006. She then worked as a psychiatrist in a specialised clinic, before taking up managerial positions, first for SAMU Social and then for the private medical group Sinoué.

== Political career ==
In parliament, Wonner serves on the Committee on Social Affairs. In addition to her role in parliament, she has been serving as a member of the French delegation to the Parliamentary Assembly of the Council of Europe since 2017. She is a member of the Sub-Committee on Children.

In addition to her parliamentary work, Wonner has been a member of the French delegation to the Parliamentary Assembly of the Council of Europe since 2019. In this capacity, she serves on the Sub-Committee on Children, which she has been chairing since 2020. She is also the Assembly’s rapporteur on discrimination against people dealing with chronic or long-term illness.

Wonner was excluded from LREM parlementary group in May 2020, left the party shortly after and was one of the 17 initial members of the short-lived Ecology Democracy Solidarity group in the National Assembly. She left the Ecology Democracy Solidarity group to join Liberties and Territories in September 2020. In July 2021, Wonner is excluded from Liberties and Territories after polemical statements in July 2021, calling for "laying siege to parliamentarians" and "invading their offices". By 2021, she announced plans to launch her own "movement".

She lost her seat in the first round of the 2022 French legislative election.

== Political positions ==
=== Foreign policy ===
In April 2018, Wonner joined other co-signatories around Sébastien Nadot in officially filing a request for a commission of inquiry into the legality of French weapons sales to the Saudi-led coalition fighting in Yemen, days before an official visit of Saudi Crown Prince Mohammed bin Salman to Paris.

In July 2019, Wonner decided not to align with her parliamentary group’s majority and became one of 52 LREM members who abstained from a vote on the French ratification of the European Union’s Comprehensive Economic and Trade Agreement (CETA) with Canada.

=== Domestic policy ===
In May 2018, Wonner co-sponsored an initiative in favour of a bioethics law extending to homosexual and single women free access to fertility treatments such as in vitro fertilisation (IVF) under France's national health insurance; it was one of the campaign promises of President Emmanuel Macron and marked the first major social reform of his five-year term.

On immigration, Wonner is considered to be part of her parliamentary group's more liberal wing. In late 2019, she was among the critics of the government's legislative proposals on immigrations and instead joined 17 LREM members who recommended, in particular, greater access to the labour market for migrants, but also "specific measures for collaboration with the authorities of safe countries, such as Albania and Georgia, in order to inform candidates for departure, in their country of origin, of what the asylum application really is."

During the COVID-19 pandemic in France, Wonner joined Philippe Douste-Blazy in expressing criticism of how the government of Prime Minister Édouard Philippe handled its response and called for easing the conditions for the use of hydroxychloroquine. She opposes mandatory vaccination.

== See also ==
- 2017 French legislative election
