= Françoise Buffet =

French politician (born 1953)

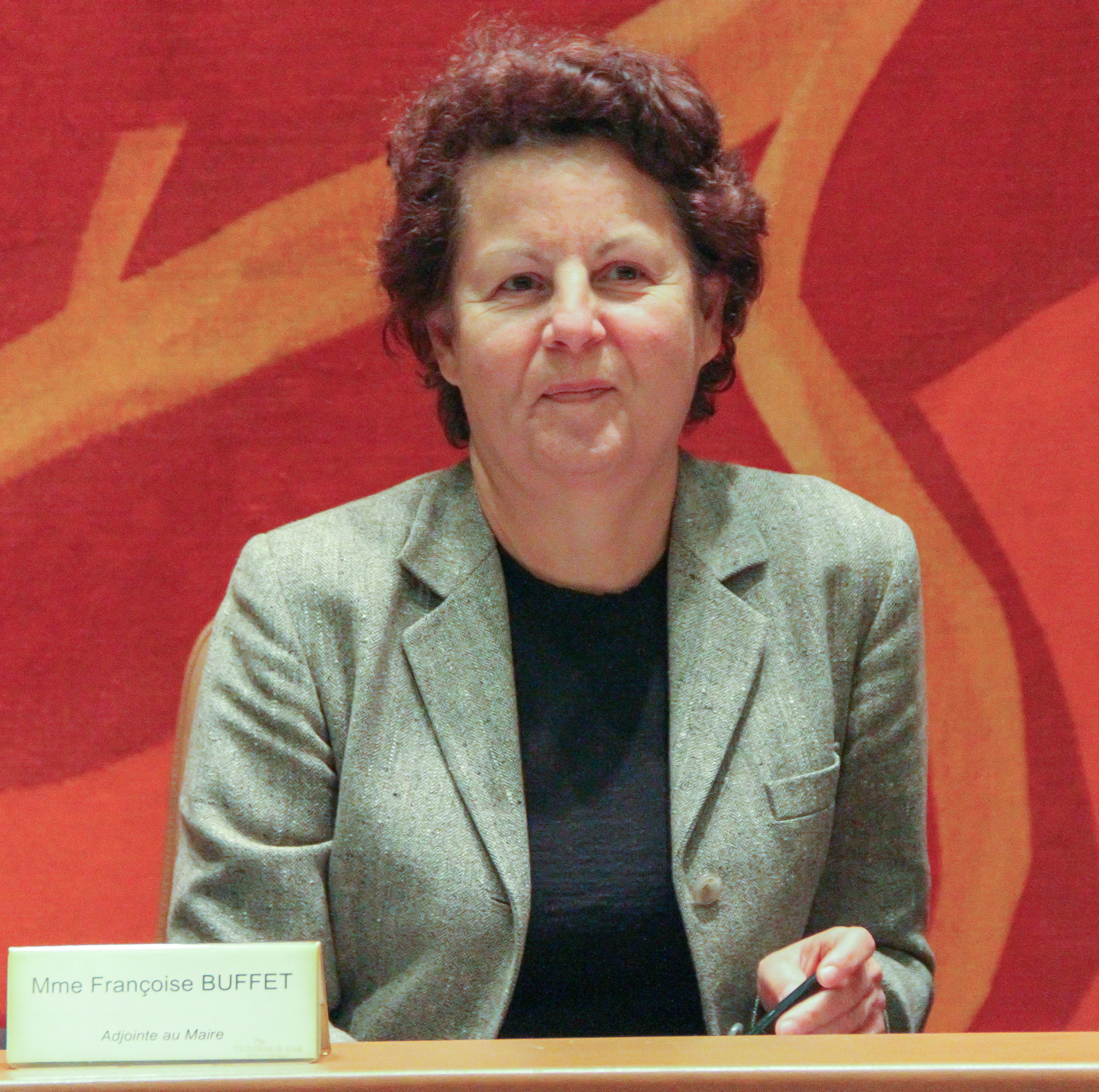

Member of the National Assembly for Bas-Rhin's 4th constituency
- Incumbent
- Assumed office 22 June 2022
- Preceded by: Martine Wonner

Personal details
- Born: 11 December 1953 (age 72) Strasbourg, France
- Party: Renaissance

Françoise Buffet (French pronunciation: [fʁɑ̃swaz byfɛ]; born 11 December 1953) is a French politician who has been Member of Parliament for Bas-Rhin's 4th constituency in the National Assembly since 2022. She is a member of Renaissance (RE).

== Biography ==
Françoise Buffet works as a business owner running a restaurant.

She was elected in 2008 and re-elected in 2014 on the Socialist Party list to the Strasbourg City Council and became deputy mayor to Roland Ries. In 2008, she was responsible for sustainable development, climate planning, green spaces, and community gardens, and in 2014, she was responsible for schools.

Although she claims not to be a member of any political party, she supports Emmanuel Macron policies and has been nominated by Renaissance/Ensemble for the 2022 French legislative elections.

She was elected in the second round against the NUPES candidate with 66.10% of the vote. She sits in the Renaissance (French political party) parliamentary group.

She was re-elected following the early 2024 French legislative election.

== See also ==
- List of deputies of the 16th National Assembly of France
