= Coat of arms of Alsace =

Versions
- Coat of arms in 1663

The coat of arms of the French region of Alsace is a combination of the historic coats of arms of Départements Haut-Rhin and Bas-Rhin.

== History ==
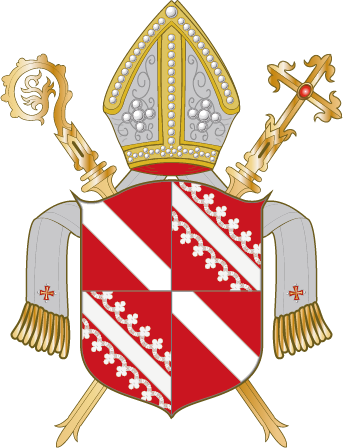
Prince-Bishopric of Strasbourg 982–1803

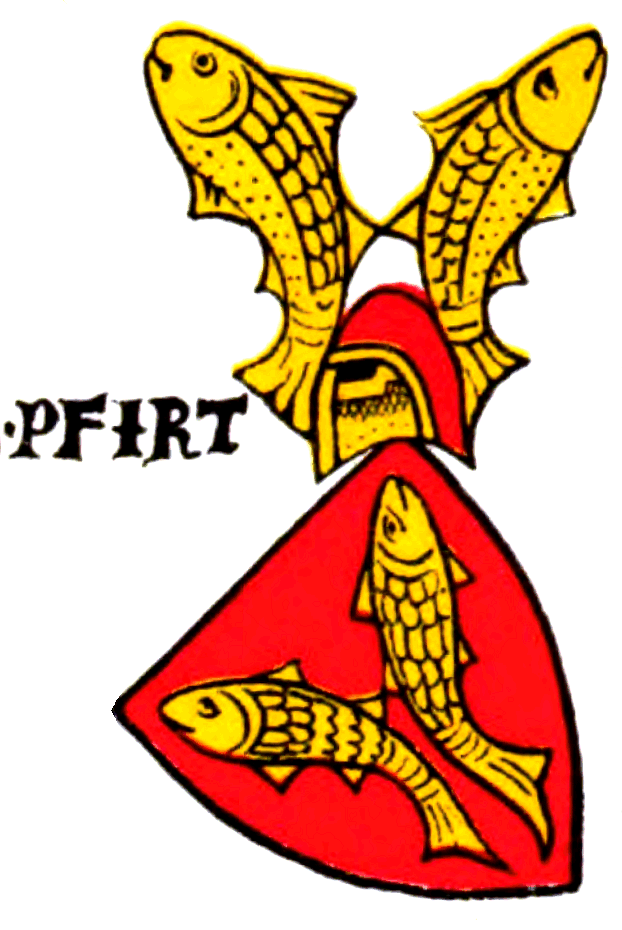
County of Ferrette

County of Hanau-Lichtenberg 1456/80 – 1736

Imperial Territory of Alsace-Lorraine 1871–1918

Imperial Territory of Alsace-Lorraine 1871–1918

Official logo of the European Collectivity of Alsace 2021-present

== See also ==
- Flag of Alsace
