= Vincent Thiébaut =

French politician

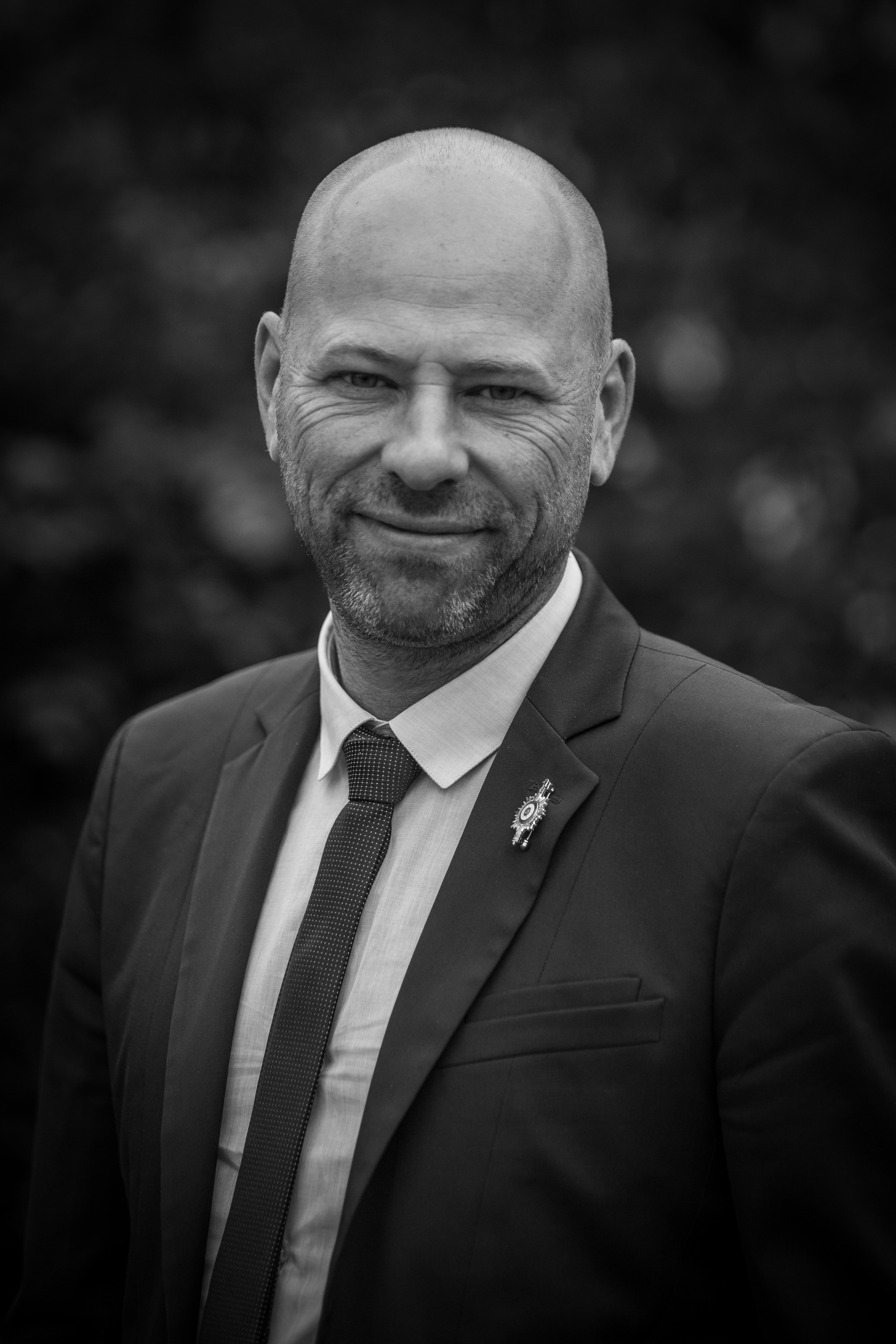

Member of the National Assembly for Bas-Rhin's 9th constituency
- Incumbent
- Assumed office 21 June 2017
- Preceded by: Claude Sturni

Personal details
- Born: 23 May 1972 (age 53) Toulouse, France
- Party: Horizons

Vincent Thiébaut (French pronunciation: [vɛ̃sɑ̃ tjebo]; born 23 May 1972) is a French politician of Horizons (HOR) who has been serving as a member of the French National Assembly since the 2017 elections, representing the department of Bas-Rhin.

== Political career ==
In parliament, Thiébaut serves on the Committee on Sustainable Development and Spatial Planning. In addition to his committee assignments, he is part of the French parliamentary friendship groups with Andorra, Belarus and Cameroon.

In July 2019, Thiébaut voted in favour of the French ratification of the European Union's Comprehensive Economic and Trade Agreement (CETA) with Canada.

== See also ==
- 2017 French legislative election
