= Stéphanie Kochert =

French politician

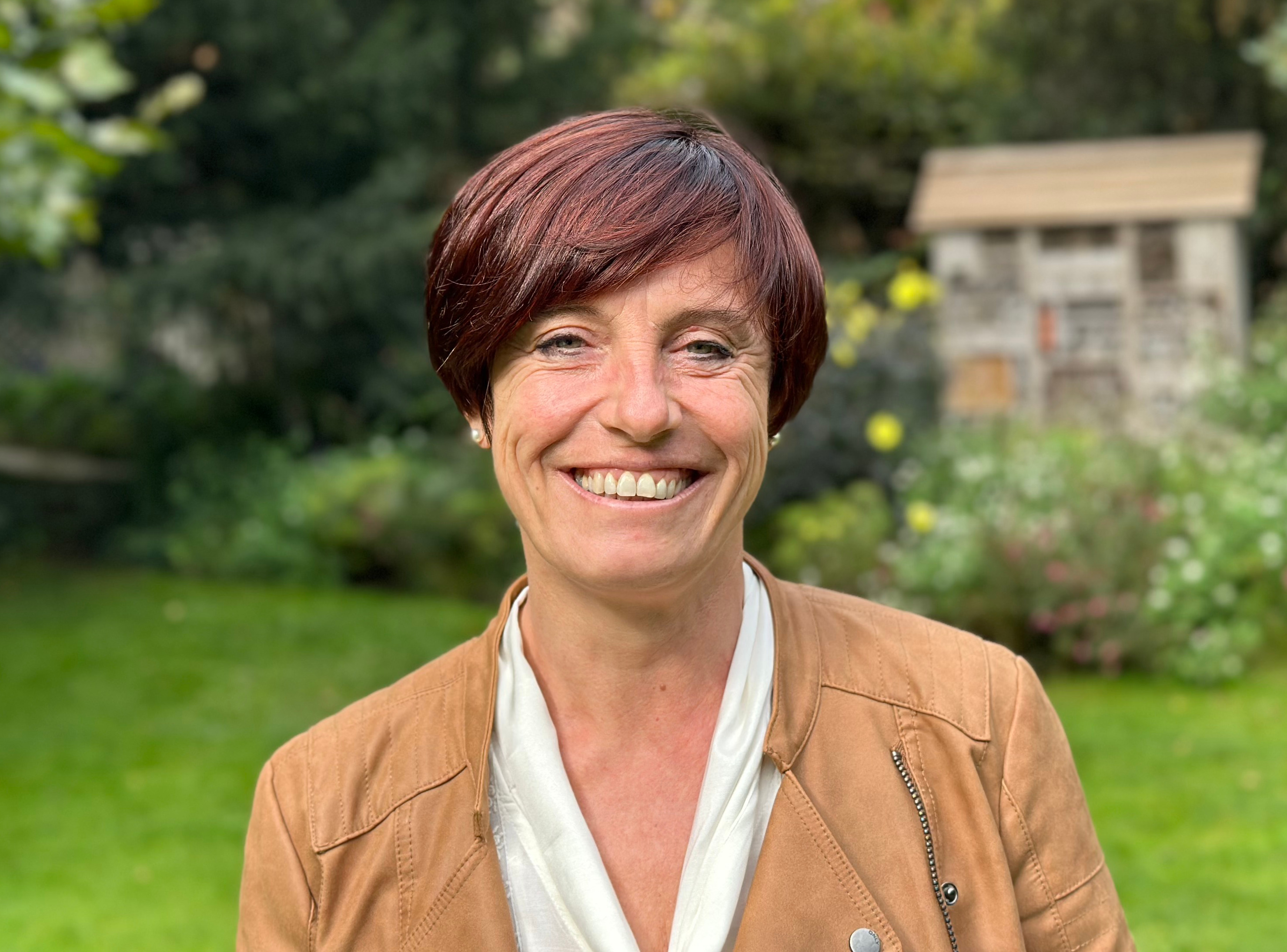

Member of the National Assembly for Bas-Rhin's 8th constituency
- Incumbent
- Assumed office 22 June 2022
- Preceded by: Frédéric Reiss

Personal details
- Born: 12 August 1975 (age 51) Wissembourg, France
- Party: UMP (until 2015); LR (2015-2021); Horizons (depuis 2021)
- Education: University of Strasbourg

Stéphanie Kochert (French pronunciation: [stefani kɔʃɛʁ]; born 12 August 1975) is a French politician of Horizons who has been serving as Member of Parliament for Bas-Rhin's 8th constituency in the National Assembly since 2022.

== Political career ==
In parliament, Kochert has since been serving on the Committee on Foreign Affairs.

In addition to her committee assignments, Kochet is part of the French delegations to the Franco-German Parliamentary Assembly and to the Parliamentary Assembly of the Council of Europe (PACE).

== See also ==
- List of deputies of the 16th National Assembly of France
