= Alemannic separatism =

Historical movement of separatism

Map of Alemannic dialect areas (c. 1950): Swabian, Low Alemannic (Upper Rhine), Low Alemannic (Lake Constance), High Alemannic, Highest Alemannic.

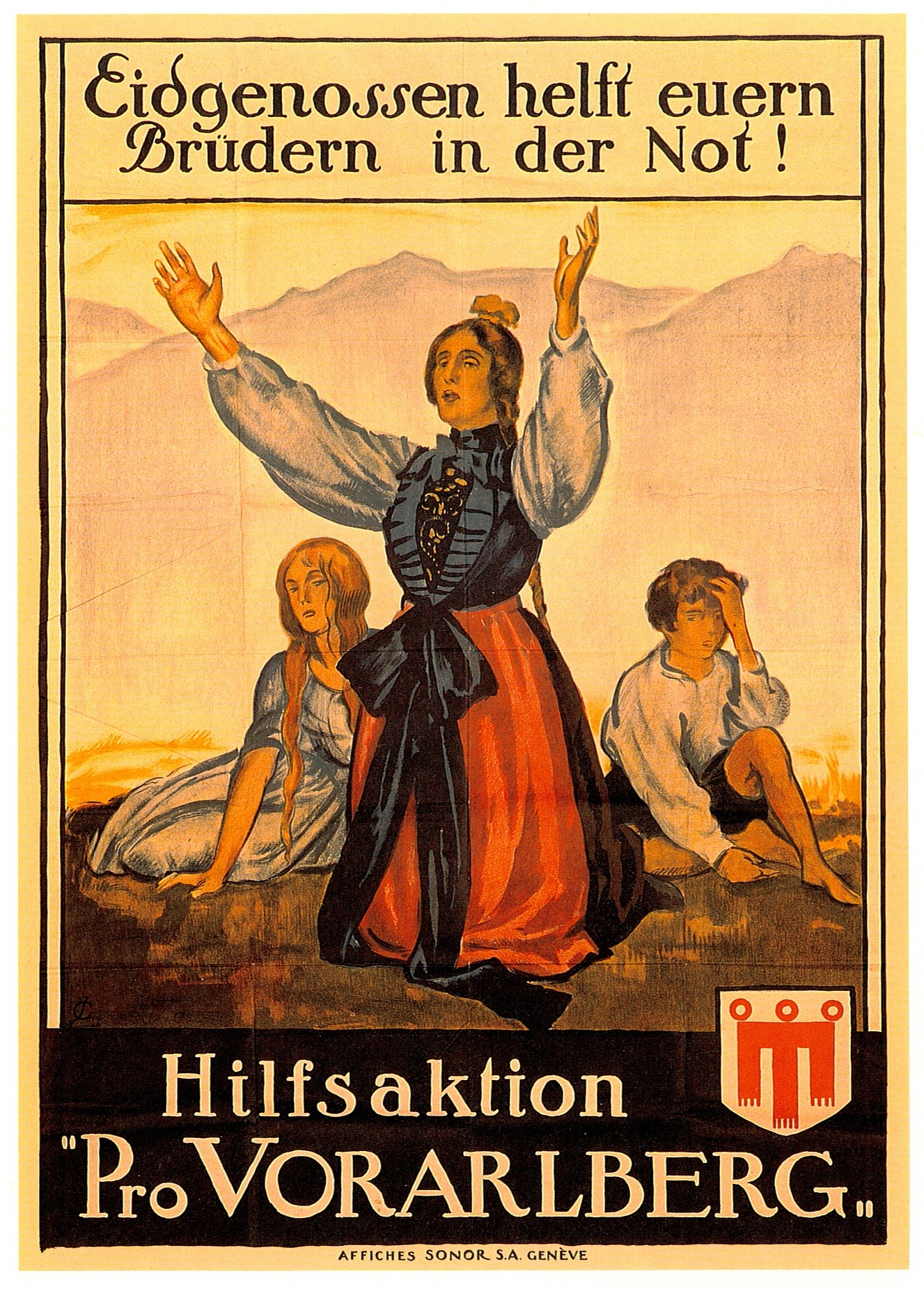
Swiss political poster advocating for the accession of Vorarlberg to the Swiss Confederacy ("Pro Vorarlberg" 1919/20)

Alemannic separatism is a historical movement of separatism of the Alemannic-German-speaking areas of Austria, France, and Germany (viz., South Baden, Swabia (viz. most of Württemberg and Bavarian Swabia), Alsace and Vorarlberg), aiming at a unification with the Swiss Confederacy (later Switzerland). The historic origins of the movement lay in the Napoleonic era (ca. 1805–1815) and it was briefly revived both after the end of World War I (1919) and after the end of World War II (1946–1952).

== Alemannic dialects ==
The term "Alemannic" for the group of High German dialects was introduced by Johann Peter Hebel in 1803, who named them for the Alamanni tribes of the Migration period. The Alemannic-speaking areas of Germany were separated into Baden and Württemberg, parts of Swabia were integrated into Bavaria in 1805; the Alemannic dialects were not the only dialects in those states (e.g. in Baden and Württemberg the Northern parts speak a Rhine Franconian dialects, East Franconian German as well as South Franconian German and in Bavaria there are Bavarian dialects as well as Rhine Franconian dialects, East Franconian German as well as South Franconian German.

Alemannic dialects were marginalised under a non-Alemannic administration. Alemannic separatism arose in the context of the resistance of the rural population of Baden against Napoleon's rule within the Confederation of the Rhine (1806–1813).

After World War I, the population of Vorarlberg in the short-lived state of Deutschösterreich (German Austria) on 11 May 1919 voted for secession to Switzerland with 81% of the popular vote. The request was denied both by the government in Vienna and by Switzerland. Similar tendencies in Baden and Württemberg were repressed before a vote was taken.

After the end of World War II, there was a political movement in southern Alsace and South Baden, originating from resistance movements against the Nazi regime, which aimed for the creation of a separate Alemannic state together with the Swiss canton of Basel.

Otto Feger (1946) suggested a decentral organisation of a "Swabian-Alemannic democracy", inspired by the Swiss model of direct democracy, while Bernhard Dietrich, mayor of Singen, aimed at a larger "Alpine union", which was to include also Bavarian-speaking territories (e.g. Bavaria and Austria) and the German-speaking parts of the Swiss Confederation. Feger's 1946 Schwäbisch-Alemannische Demokratie with 240,000 copies was the most-printed book in French-administered Germany (1945–1949).

The organisational backbone of Alemannic separatism was the Schwäbisch-Alemannischer Heimatbund, but the French administration was unsympathetic and refused the permission required for the foundation of a political party with the aim of such an Alemannic state. The current Bundesland Baden-Württemberg within the Federal Republic of Germany was founded in 1952, effectively ending any serious political scenarios of Alemannic separatism, although the concept remains alive as a nostalgic sentiment, rather than a political program. This is particularly true in South Baden, which was the only region in which the majority of people voted against unification with Württemberg in the 1951 plebiscite, which was held to authorise the unification in accordance with Article 29 of the new West German constitution, the Grundgesetz. The overall vote was, however, in favour of the creation of the new Südweststaat (Southwest Land).

== See also ==
- Alsace independence movement
- Duchy of Swabia
- Schwabenhass
- Enlargement of Switzerland
- Jurassic separatism
- Switzerland as a federal state
