= Unser Land =

French political party in Alsace

Our Land Unser Land
- President: Jean-Georges Trouillet
- Founded: 31 October 2009
- Merger of: Alsatian People's Union; For Alsace
- Headquarters: Ensisheim, Haut-Rhin, Alsace
- Ideology: Regionalism; Autonomism
- European affiliation: European Free Alliance, FUEN
- Colours: red and white
- Assembly of Alsace: 0 / 80
- Regional Council of Grand Est: 0 / 169
- National Assembly: 0 / 577
- Senate: 0 / 348
- European Parliament: 0 / 81

Website
- unserland.org

Unser Land (English: Our Land) is a political party in the French region of Alsace, established in 2009. It is member of the Fédération Régions et Peuples Solidaires in France and the European Free Alliance of the European Union.

It was formed after Union du peuple alsacien (founded in 1988) and Fer's Elsass (founded in 2002) merged in 2009.

The party advocates autonomy for Alsace.

== See also ==
- Alsace d'abord
- Alemannic separatism
