= August Stöber =

Alsatian scholar and folklorist

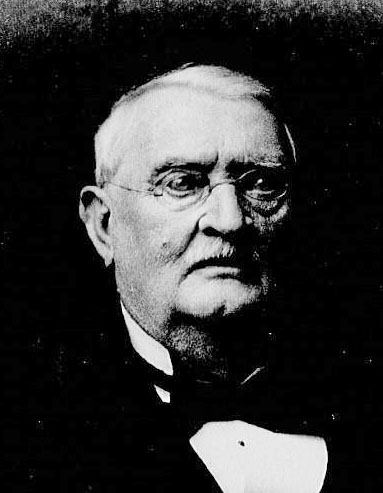
August Stöber

August Daniel Ehrenfried Stöber (1808–1884) was an Alsatian poet, scholar and collector of folklore.

He was born on 9 July 1808 in Strasbourg and died on 19 March 1884 in Mulhouse, where he had worked as a teacher. Stöber composed poetry and tales in the Alsatian dialect, and studied the culture and history of his homeland.

== Works ==
- Elsässisches Sagenbuch. Straßburg 1842.
- Die Lindenkirche. In: Badisches Sagen-Buch. 2. Band. Karlsruhe: Creuzbauer und Kasper, 1846, S. 140–141
- Die Sagen des Elsasses. St. Gallen 1852.
