= Miel d'Alsace =

Honey product from Alsace

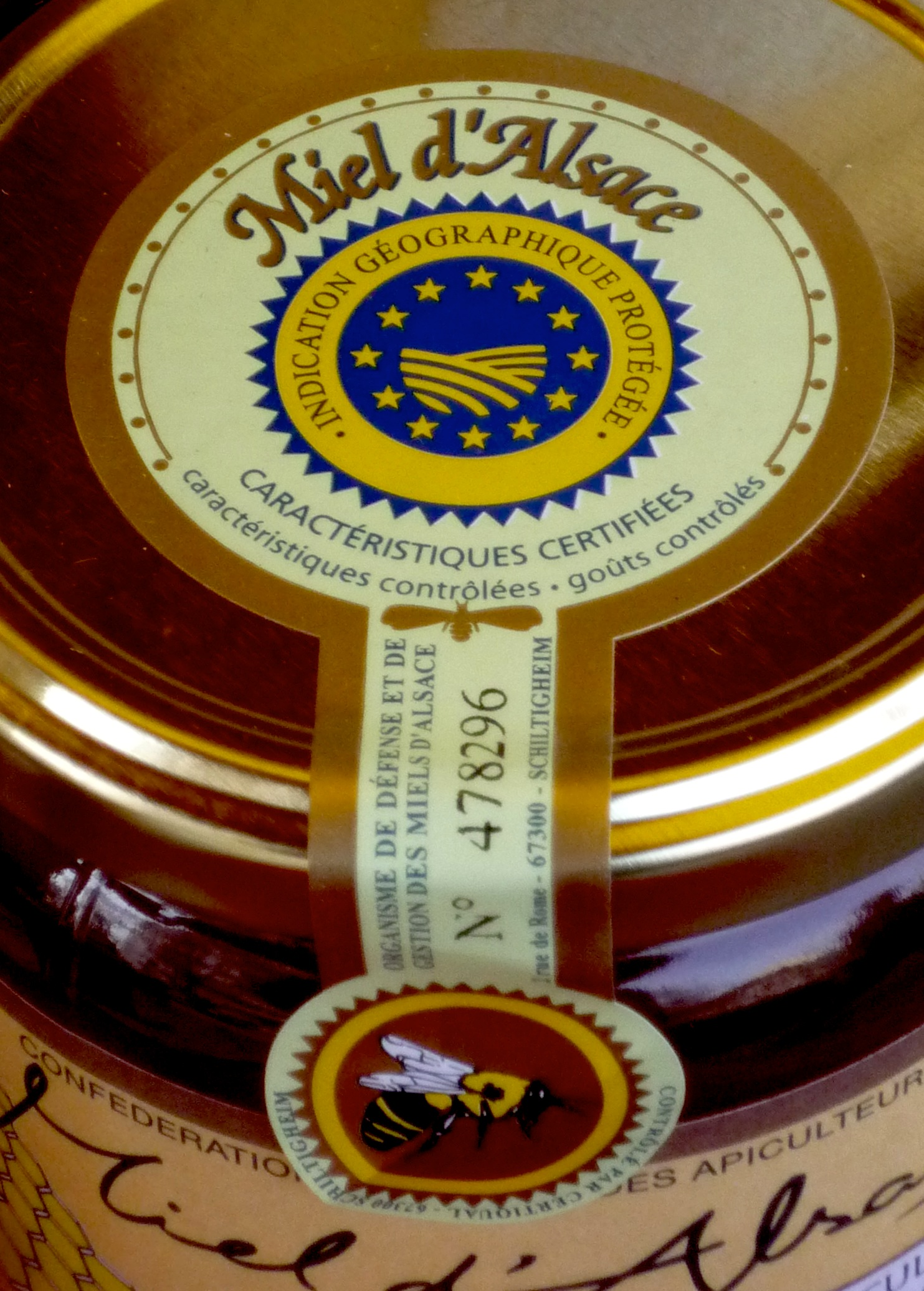
Miel d'Alsace label showing the PGI designation

Miel d'Alsace is a honey from France that is protected under EU law with PGI status, first published under relevant laws in 2005. The PGI status covers several varieties of honey produced in Alsace, namely silver fir honey, chestnut honey, acacia honey, lime honey, forest honey, and multi-flower honey.

To be given the PGI designation, the hives producing the honey must be installed in Alsace. In addition, silver fir honey is given a perimeter of the Alsatian slopes of the Vosges and Jura mountain ranges. Chestnut honey must be gathered in the hills south of the Vosges, in the forests of Brumath and Haguenau. Lime honey must come from the forests of Hardt, Upper Rhine. While the honey collection areas are defined, extraction can take place outside of these areas, provided that traceability is ensured. Traceability of the honey is ensured through record keeping of labels, which are then checked against harvest declarations and stocks. Also, 30 percent of all Miel d'Alsace undergoes microscopic analysis to ensure proof of origin.

== Regulations ==
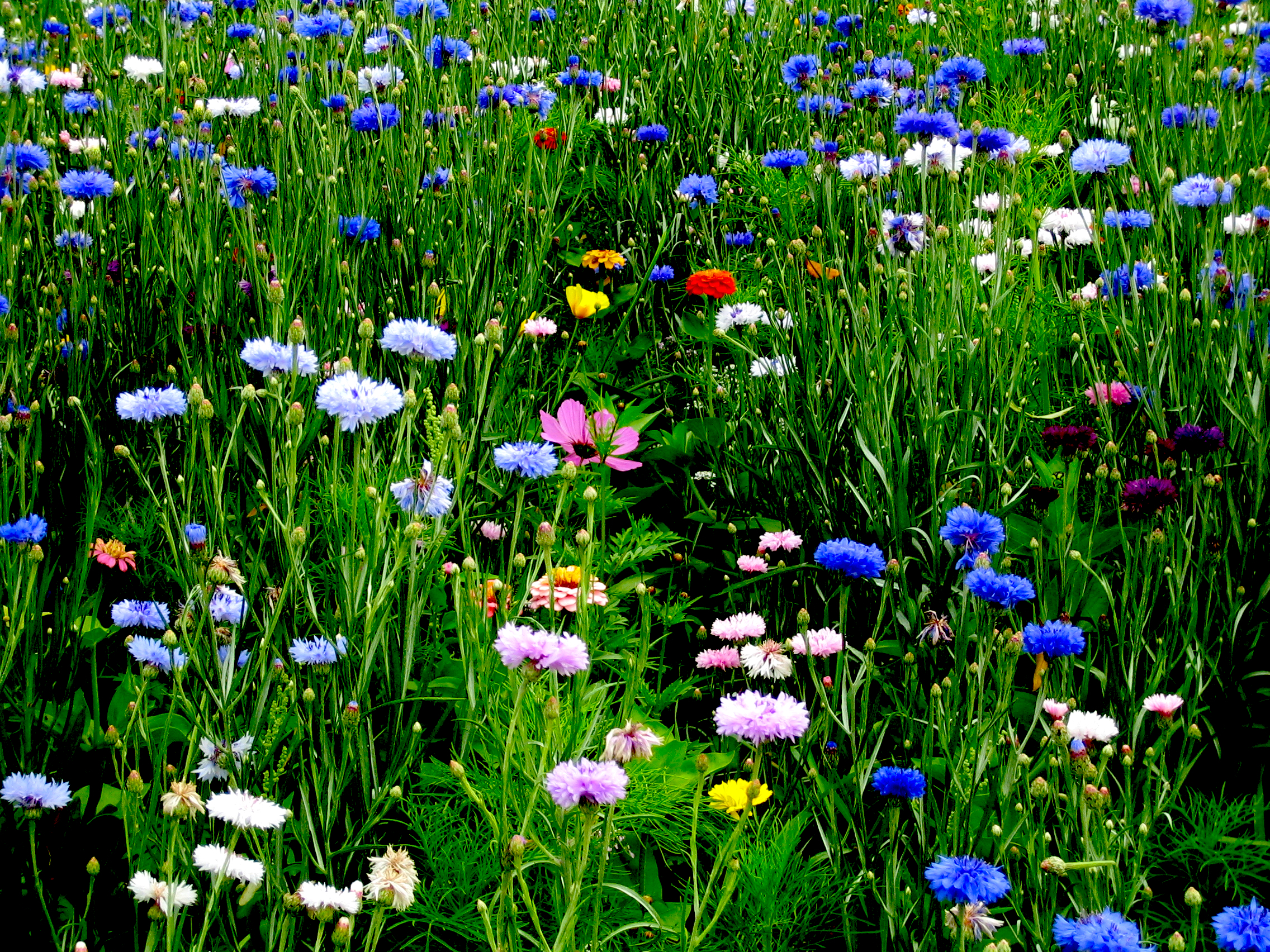
Fallow beekeeping in a communal flowerbed in Holtzheim, Alsace, July 2009

According to official regulations, "Each type of honey develops its own physico-chemical and organoleptic characteristics, which are defined in the specification and correspond to the floral diversity of the region. The diversity of Alsatian honeys stems directly from the diversity of the prevailing ecosystems. Alsace comprises several areas: an area of mountains covered with softwoods, an area made up of hills and plateaux with vines, meadows and beech and chestnut forests, and a plain consisting of cropped land and meadows. The resulting diversity of ecosystems hence allows harvesting to take place from early spring to early autumn, providing a wide variety of products."
