= Eugène Prévost (musician) =

French composer and conductor

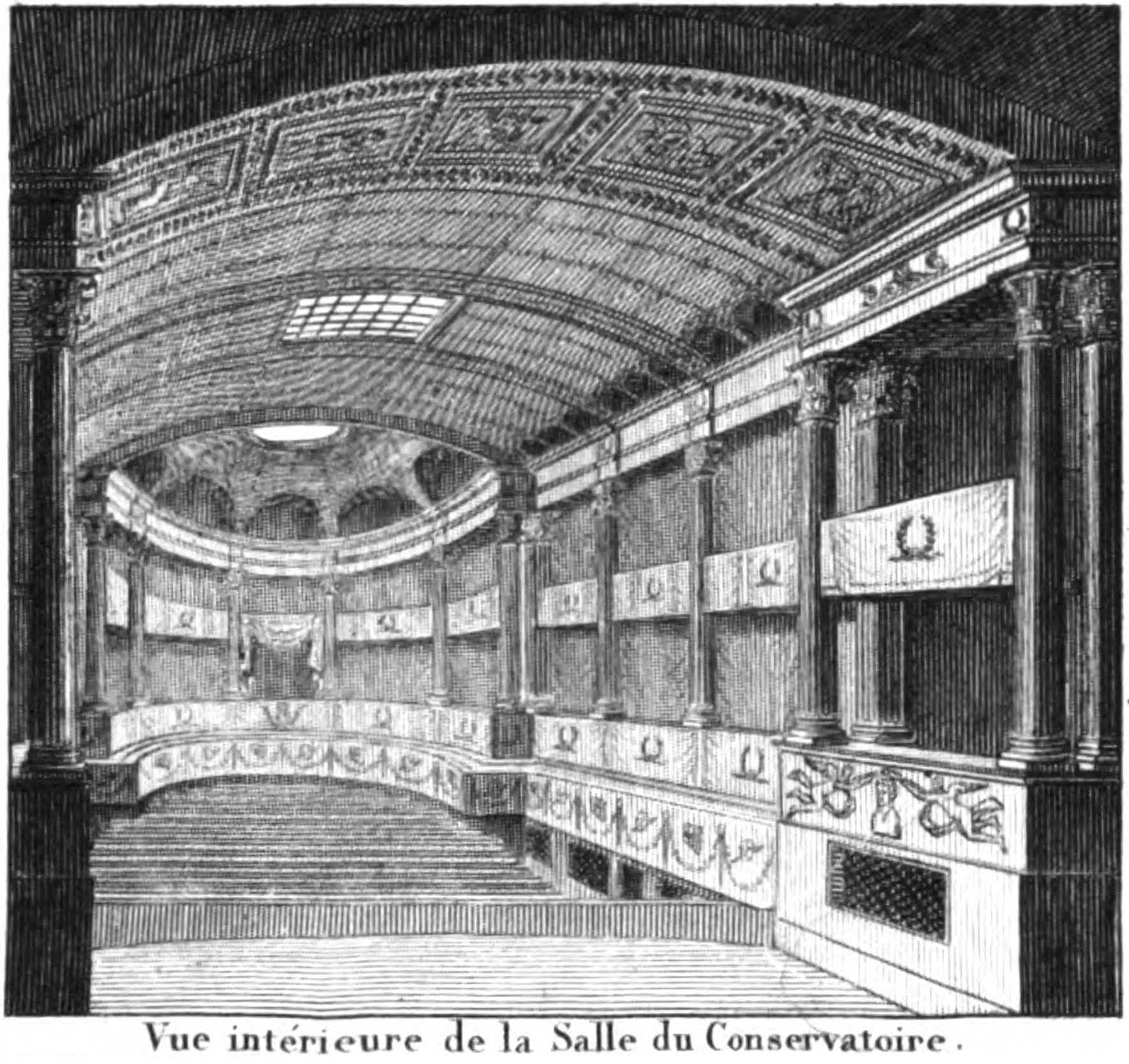
The Theatre of the Conservatoire de Paris in 1821

Eugène-Prosper Prévost (French: [øʒɛn pʁevo]; 23 April 1809 – 19 August 1872) was a French composer and conductor.

== Life ==
Born in Paris, Prévost was introduced to music by his older sister, the singer Geneviève-Aimé-Zoë Prévost. From 1827 he studied counterpoint at the Conservatoire de Paris with Daniel Jelensperger and Louis Seuriot and musical composition with Jean-François Lesueur. In 1831, he won the Premier Grand Prix de Rome with the two-part scene La Fuite de Bianca Capello on a text by Amédée de Pastoret.

In the same year he married the singer Augustine Dejean-Leroy (born 1807), who became known as Éléonore Colon, and went with her to Le Havre. After his stay in Rome in 1833 he made his debut as a composer with the world premiere of the Opéra bouffe Cosimo ou le peintre badigeonneur 1835 at the Opéra-Comique, where several more of his operas were performed until 1839.

In 1838, he was engaged as a conductor at the Théâtre Français in New Orleans, where he introduced himself with a performance of The Barber of Seville. In addition to works by contemporary Italian and French composers such as Gaetano Donizetti and Daniel-François-Esprit Auber, he performed several operas of his own. 1841 he conducted several performances of the ballet La Sylphide by Filippo Taglioni with the dancer Fanny Elßler.

In the summer of 1843, Prévost toured North America with his orchestra, taking him to New York, Philadelphia and Montreal. In 1845 he performed again in New York, where on July 4 he composed a Patriotic Cantata and a National March for this occasion. Between 1850 and 1852 he conducted at the theatre in The Hague.

In 1853, Prévost conducted the world premiere of the opera David by the then fifteen-year-old Ernest Guiraud in New Orleans. He wrote his own compositions, including a three-part oratorio, songs and piano pieces, and worked as a teacher. Among others he studied counterpoint and harmony with Edmond Dédé.

With the outbreak of the American Civil War in 1861, Prévost returned to France, but in the summer of the following year gave a benefit concert in New Orleans for the musicians and artists of the city. In 1864, he became director of the Théâtre des Bouffes-Parisiens founded by Offenbach, where he worked until 1867. Besides several operettas by Offenbach he also performed Léo Delibes' Le Serpent à plumes. He was also conductor of the Concerts des Champs-Élysées from 1864. In 1863, his opera L'Illustre Gaspard was performed at the Opéra-Comique.

In late 1867, Prévost returned to New Orleans, where he taught music and singing at the "Institution Locquet". His last opera, Blanche et René, was written here in 1871.

Prévost had three sons: Léon Prévost, who also became known as a composer; Toussaint, who became an internationally successful pianist under the name Théodore Ritter; and Eugène, who died in 1856 at the age of sixteen.

== Works ==
- Cosimo ou le peintre badigeonneur, opéra bouffe, 1835
- Les Pontons de Cadix, opéra comique after a libretto by Paul Duport and Jacques-François Ancelot, 1836
- La Esméralda, opera in 4 acts after Victor Hugo's the Hunchback of Notre-Dame, 1836
- Le Bon garçon, opéra comique after a libretto by Auguste Anicet-Bourgeois, 1837
- La Chaste Suzanne, opera in 4 acts, 1839
- Cosimo, opera, f.p. 1839
- Oratorium in three parts: Josué, Ouverture patriotique, L'Orléanaise, Messe, Te Deum
- La Marche du général Taylor, march for piano, 1846
- The Departure of the volunteer, a national song, for voice and piano, 1846
- L'Illustre Gaspard, opera, 1863
- La Sensitive, for piano, 1866
- Chant de fête de la Garde, cantata after a text by Gustave Chouquet, 1867
- Blanche et René, opéra comique after a libretto by Louis Placide Canonge, 1871
