= Soléa =

French public transport operator

Coordinates: 47°45′46.5″N 7°20′11.8″E

- Type: Private
- Industry: Public transport
- Headquarters: Mulhouse
- Number of employees: 544
- Website: www.solea.info

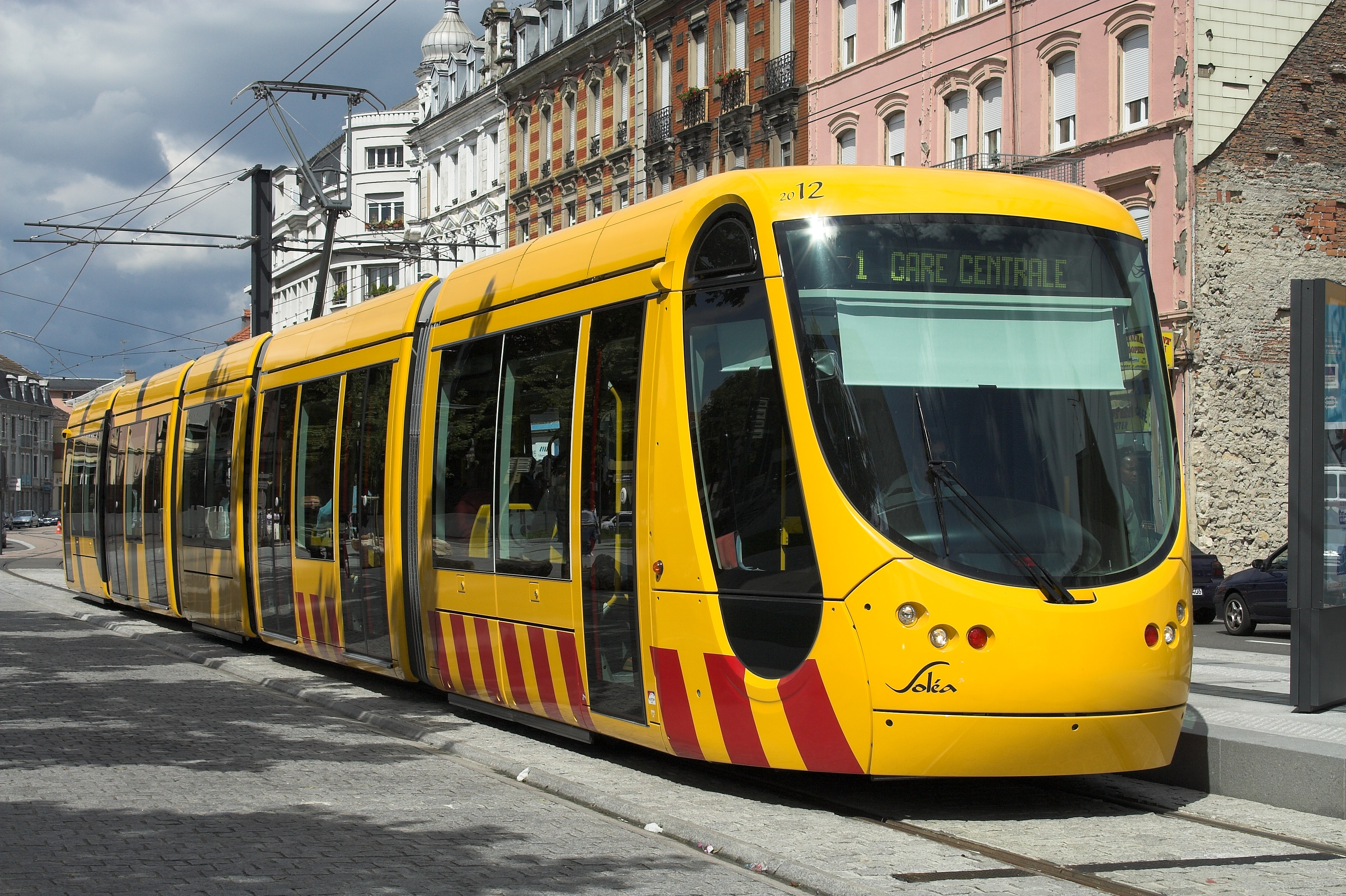
Alstom Citadis 302 tram operated by Soléa on its urban tram routes

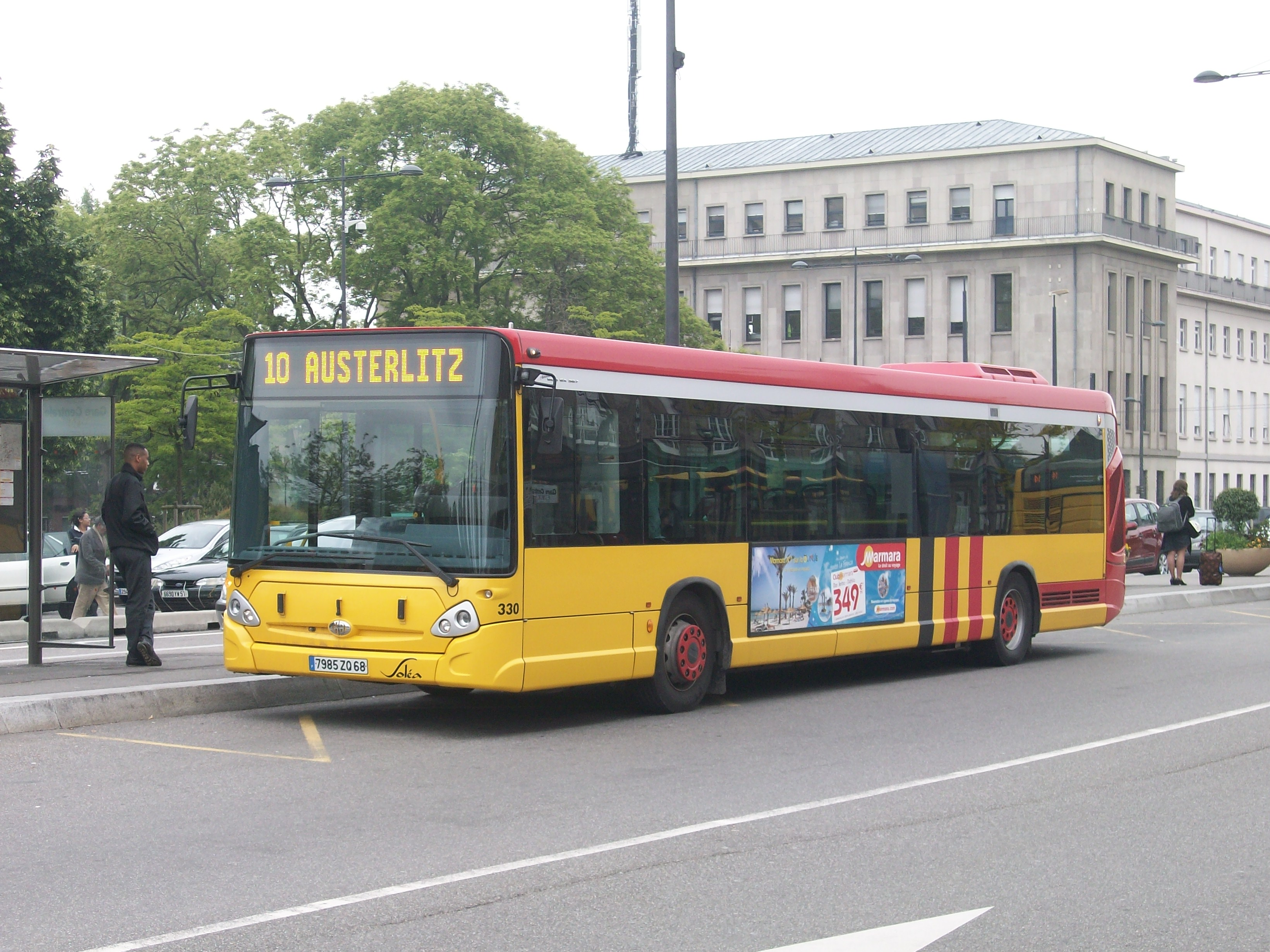
Heuliez GX 327 bus operated by Soléa

Soléa is a public transport operator in the French city of Mulhouse. Under contract to the Mulhouse Alsace Agglomération, it operates the city's bus network and three of the lines of the city's tram network. It also jointly operates, with the French national rail operator SNCF, the city's fourth tram line, a tram-train service.

Soléa is a mixed private and public sector company. Its principal shareholders are the transport group Transdev (67.8%), the Paris transport operator RATP (20%), the Mulhouse Alsace Agglomération (10%) and the Colmar transport operator TRACE (1%).

Soléa carries more than 107,800 passengers per day, and serves a community of 245 367 inhabitants, in an area of 227 square kilometres (88 sq mi). It has 544 employees.

== Trams ==
The Mulhouse tram system commenced service in 2006 and was last extended in December 2010. It now comprises three purely tram lines, plus one hybrid tram-train line:

- Line 1 from Gare Centrale to Châtaignier
- Line 2 from Nouveau Bassin to Coteaux
- Line 3 from Gare Central to Lutterbach
- Tram-train line from Gare Centrale to Thann via Lutterbach

The system is operated by 27 Alstom Citadis 302 trams, which operate routes 1 to 3, and 12 Siemens Avanto tram-trains, which operate the route to Thann. On the latter route, Soléa manages the route as far as Lutterbach and provides 25% of the drivers, whilst the remainder of the route and the remaining drivers are provided by the SNCF.

== Buses ==
Soléa operates 21 daytime bus routes, plus a shuttle service between Gare Central and Mulhouse hospital. It also operates 13 routes on evenings, Sundays and holidays, and 13 school bus routes. It does this with a fleet of 131 buses, of which 43 are articulated buses. Lines:

(1), (2), (3) represents the tram lines. The «C» stands for Chrono, Chrono lines are 4 bus lines with a frequency of 1 bus every 5–7 minutes.

C4

Wittenheim — Sainte-Barbe ⥋ Mulhouse — Châtaignier Opened September 2, 2019/ closed/ — Length 6,4 km (3.9 miles) Duration 15 min Nb. Of stops 16

Stations: Cities and places served: Wittenheim (Church Sainte-Barbe, City center, La Halle au Coton), Kingersheim (city hall) and Mulhouse served stations: Châtaignier (1).

Others: Stops not accessible for wheelchair users: Kellermann

Schedule: The line is in service Monday through Friday at 4:35am to 11:45pm, on Saturday until 0:25pm and on Saturdays 7:10am to 11:45pm environ. History: The bus line «C4» was once the line 4 of the old network which was put into service in September 2013 as part of the Mulhouse high-level bus service.

C5

Illzach — Jonquilles ⥋ via Cité Administrative, Dornach and Gare centrale Opened September 2, 2019 / Closed / — length 15,4 km(9,5miles) on C5A - 15 km(9.3miles) on C5B Duration 41 min Nb. Of stops 42

Stations : Cities and places served : Illzach (High-schools Ettore-Bugatti) and Mulhouse (Cité Drouot, Nouveau Bassin, La Filature, Cité Wagner, Siège social et dépôt Soléa, Cimetière central, Parc des expositions, Cité de l'automobile, Cité Administrative, Temple Saint-Paul, Église Saint-Fridolin, (High-school)Lycée Lambert, Church Sainte-Thérèse, Dornach, Haute École des arts du Rhin, Clinique du Diaconat-Fonderie, La Fonderie, Bibliothèque de l'université et de la Société industrielle, Port de plaisance, Musée de l'Impression sur étoffes) Served stations : Nouveau Bassin (2), Lefebvre (2), Cité de l'Auto (1), Cité Administrative (1), Gare de Mulhouse-Dornach, Daguerre (2, 3 and Tram-train), Goerich and Gare de Mulhouse-Ville.

Others: Stations not accessible for wheelchair users: Ill (way A), Pyramide (way B), Lefebvre, Vauban, Marceau (way B), Cité Wagner (way A), Cité Administrative, Anna Schoen, Lavoisier, Pranard, Villon (way B), Goerich, Gay Lussac, Général Leclerc, Bonnes Gens (way A), Porte de Bâle, Printemps, Laurent (way A) and Puits.

Schedule: The line is in service through Monday to Saturday from 5:25am to 11:45pm and the Sundays from 7:30am to 11:45pm.

C6

Morschwiller-le-Bas — Collines IKEA ⥋ Illzach — Carrefour Île Napoléon (Sausheim — during business days) Opened September 2, 2019 / Closed / — Length 15,9 km(9.8 miles) Duration 49 (53) min Nb. Of stops 34 (37)

Stations : Cities and places served : Morschwiller-le-Bas, Mulhouse (Parc d'activités des collines, Coteaux, technological University, High-school Louis-Armand, Dornach, Place du Marché, Place de la Liberté, Tribunal de grande instance, Tour de l'Europe, Mall Porte Jeune, Parc Salvator, Bollwerk, Cité Drouot), Illzach (High-school Ettore-Bugatti, Pôle économique de l'Île Napoléon, Mall Île Napoléon) et Sausheim (Zone Espale) Served stations: Bel Air (2),Dumas, Nations (2), Grand Rex (1) et Porte Jeune (1, 2, 3 and Tram-train), Europe.

Others: Stations not accessible for wheelchair users: Cézanne, Nations, Ravin, Cimetière Dornach, Briand, Fil, Oberkampf, Marché Canal Couvert, "Grand Rex" vers Ikea, Porte de Bâle, Printemps, Laurent, Puits, Tulipes, Italie, Carrefour Île Napoléon, Pyrénées, Bretagne et Espale.

Schedule: the line is in service from Monday through Friday from 5:25am to 9:55pm and the Saturday until 9:25pm environ.

Peculiarity: from Monday to Friday from 7am à 7pm, the line is extended to serve the Espale area.

C7

Mulhouse — Lesage ⥋ Mulhouse — Hôpital E. Muller Opened September 2, 2019 / Closed / — Length 10 km (6.2 miles) Duration 36 min Nb. Of stops 27

Stations: Cities and places served: Mulhouse (Place du Marché, Place de la Liberté, Tribunal de grande instance, Tour de l'Europe, Centre commercial Porte Jeune, Parc Salvator, Bollwerk, Musée de l'Impression sur étoffes, Port de plaisance, Botanic and Zoo park, Hospital Émile Muller) Served stations: Grand Rex (1), Porte Jeune (1, 2, 3 et Tram-train), Anvers, Europe et Gare de Mulhouse-Ville.

Others : Stations not accessible for wheelchair users: Lesage, Jean Martin Hospital E.Muller, Brustlein direction Lesage, Tarn Bis direction Anvers, Villon direction Hospital E.Muller, Oberkampf, Marché Canal Couvert, Grand Rex direction Lesage, Bonnes Gens direction Lesage, Général Leclerc, Saint-Damien direction Hospital E.Muller. Articulated bus : Only used for Lesage or Tarn Bis to Anvers or Europe

Schedule: The line is in service Monday through Saturday from 5:15am to 10:25pm and the Sundays from 8am to 10:25pm.
