= John Loretz =

American organist and composer (1840–1908)

John M. Loretz Jr. (1840–1908) (Note: Other sources, such as The Brooklyn Daily Eagle 's December 30, 1931 epitaph, state that he was born in 1846. The 1840 date is taken from Cyclopedia of Music and Musicians (1889) Vol.2, page 484.) was a French-born American composer. His compositions include a wide range of patriotic anthems, waltzes, and sacred pieces. He was the son of John B. Loretz, a prominent organist and composer.

== Life and career ==
John M. Loretz Jr. was born in 1840 in Mulhouse, in the Alsace region of France. He was the son of John B. Loretz, an organist at St. Stephen's Church in New York City and later at the Clinton Avenue Congregational Church in Brooklyn, who emigrated from France to the United States in 1849.

By age 18 John M. was an organist at the Lorraine Cathedral. He moved to the US and joined the Navy. He would later serve again during the Spanish-American War. In 1857 he returned to France to study at the Paris Conservatoire under Antoine Marmontel, Napoléon Henri Reber, Adolphe-François Laurent and others.

His early works, such as the "Grecian Bend Waltz" (1858), already showcased his talent for composition. Loretz made his debut as a pianist in 1860 with the Brooklyn Philharmonic Society. He served as an organist for several churches in Brooklyn and worked as a conductor at the Park Theatre in New York and as a bandmaster in the United States Navy.

He played the organ at the Church of St. Agnes located at Hoyt and Sackett Streets in Brooklyn, and people from all over the city attended high mass at St. Agnes to see him play, especially during visits by notable figures like Cardinal Gibbons and Francis P. Duffy.

In 1872, his opera "The Pearl of Bagdad" was performed at the Brooklyn Lyceum.

After retiring from music, Loretz moved to Hollywood, California, living with his brother, Arthur.

== Music ==
He gained recognition for his compositions that often carried strong patriotic and unionist themes, especially during the American Civil War period. His 1865 work, "American Anthems on the Triumph of Liberty and Union Over Slavery and Treason. Freedom Triumphant" is a notable example of this genre.

Loretz's repertoire was diverse, encompassing various forms and styles, including waltzes, marches, and sacred music. His compositions like "The Glory of a Reunited Nation. Song and Chorus" (1880) and "The Conductor's Song, or, The Maiden on the Car" (1880) were well-received during his time. He also composed several sacred pieces.

== Selected works ==
- Grecian Bend Waltz (1858)
- Uncle Sam, What Ails You? (1862)
- American Anthems on the Triumph of Liberty and Union Over Slavery and Treason. Freedom Triumphant (1865)
- Gems of St. Peters. A Collection of Sacred Pieces. The Forsaken. Prayer (1865)
- Grand Easter Te Deum and Jubilate, Op.175 (1871)
- Mass in G major (1871)
- Pearl of Bagdad (1872)
- Morning Service in G major, Op.177 (1874)
- The Glory of a Reunited Nation. Song and Chorus (1880)
- The Conductor's Song, or, The Maiden on the Car (1880)
- The Hero of Our Day! (1881)
- Light Ahead (1885)
- The Forsaken, Op.129 (1885)
- Salve Regina, Op.401 (1885)
- Offertoire (1895)
- Plainte (1896)
