= Mulhouse tramway =

Tram system in Mulhouse, France

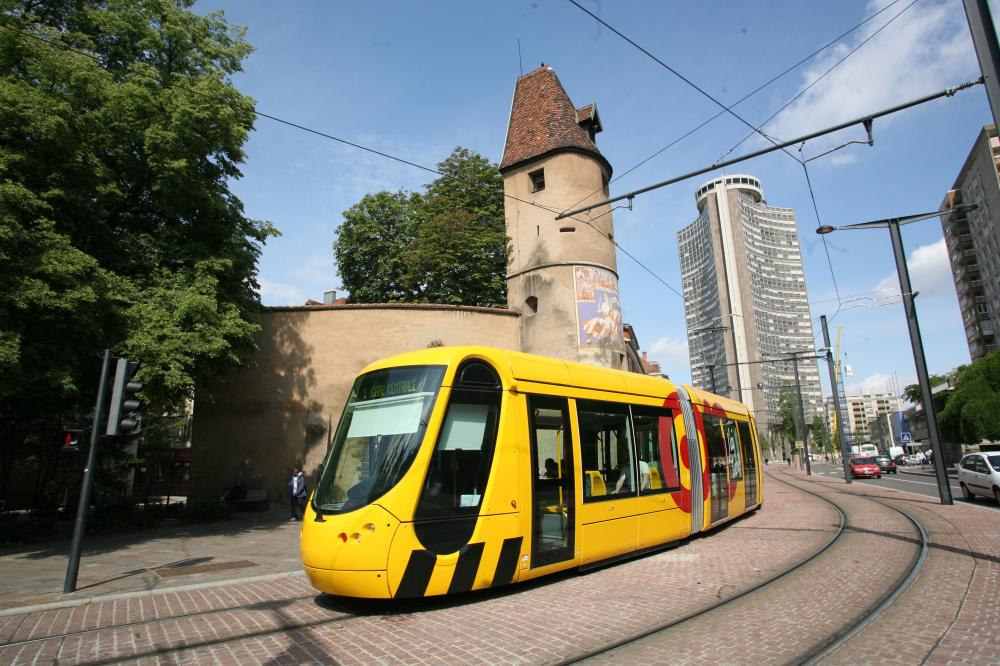

Overview
- Native name: Tramway de Mulhouse
- Locale: Mulhouse, Grand Est, France
- Transit type: Tram and Tram-train
- Number of lines: 4
- Annual ridership: 15.00 million (2018)

Operation
- Began operation: 12 June 2006
- Operators: Soléa and SNCF

Technical
- Track gauge: 1,435 mm (4 ft 8 1/2 in) standard gauge
- Electrification: 750 V DC & 25 kV 50 Hz AC from overhead catenary
System map
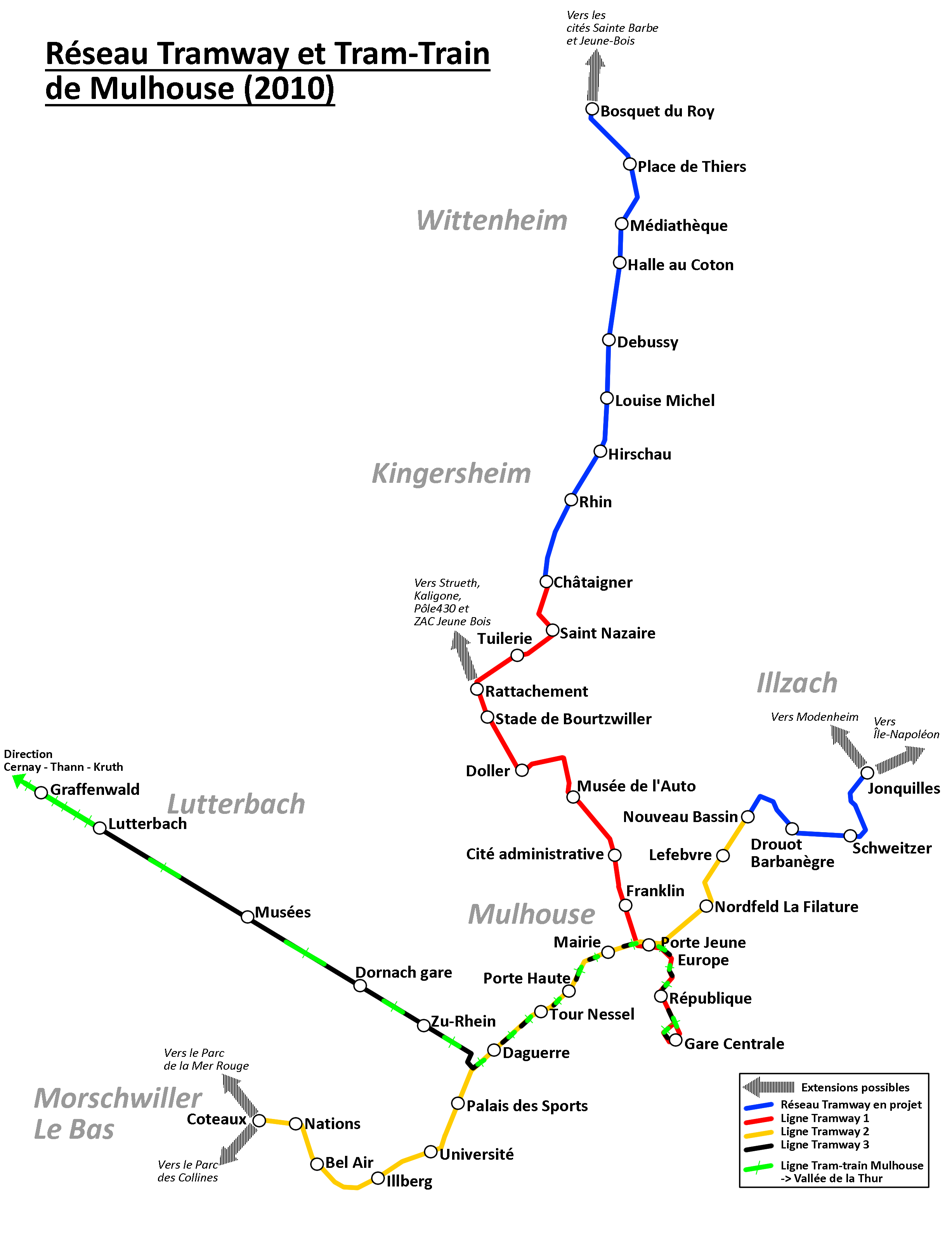
Map of Mulhouse tramway
Key

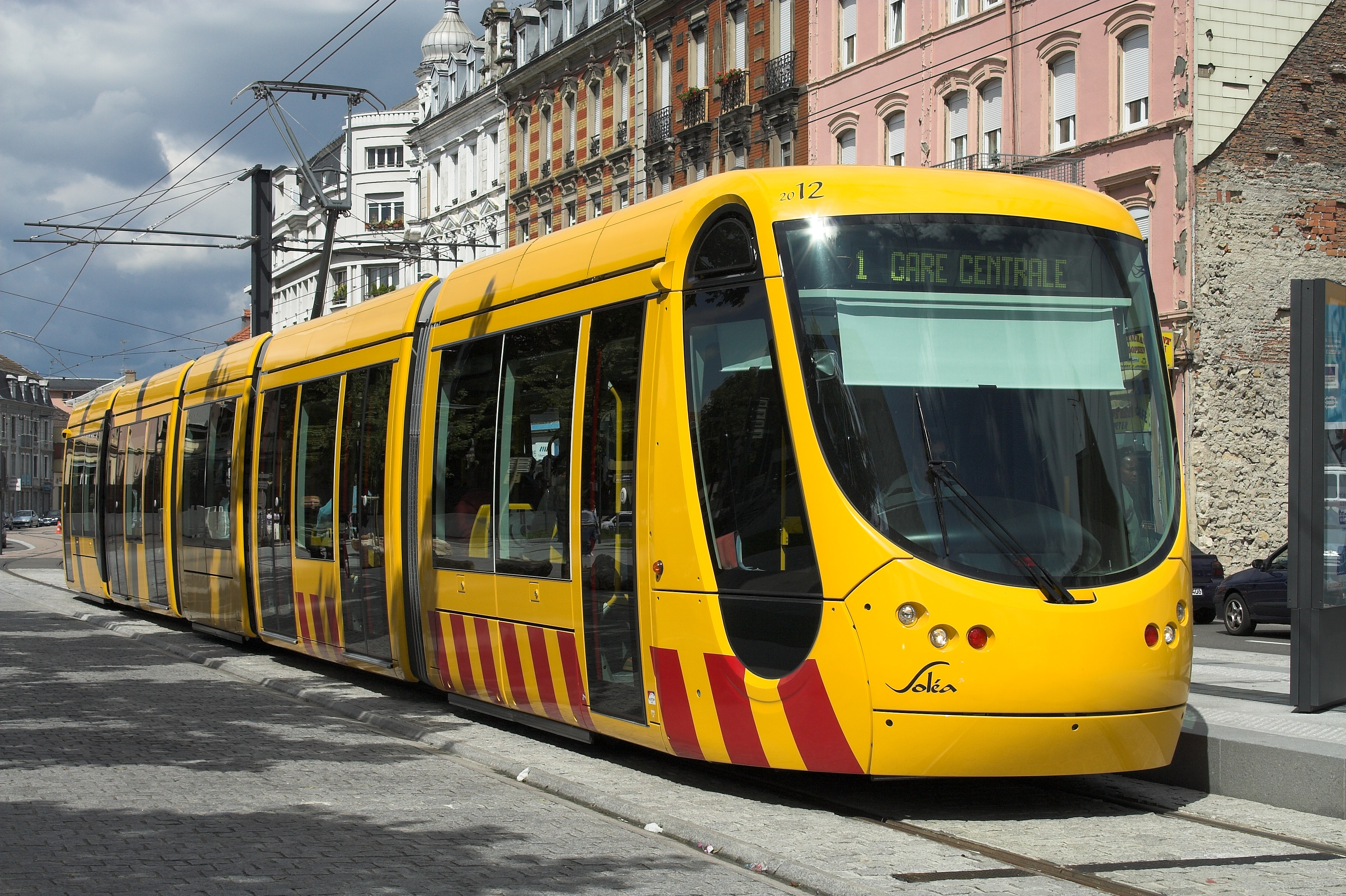
Mulhouse Alstom Citadis 302 tram

The Mulhouse tramway (French: Tramway de Mulhouse; Alsatian: D'Strossabàhn Milhüsa) is a tram network in the French city of Mulhouse in Alsace, France. It commenced service in 2006, and now comprises three purely tram lines, plus one hybrid tram-train line.

== Tram services ==
The three pure tram lines intersect at Porte Jeune stop in central Mulhouse, and comprise:

- Line from Gare Centrale to Châtaignier
- Line from Nouveau Bassin to Coteaux
- Line from Gare Central to Lutterbach

Lines 1 and 2 were put into service in 2006, whilst line 3 is a short working of the tram-train line and opened in December 2010 with that line. Extensions are planned for line 1, from Châtaignier to Bosquets du Roy, and for line 2, from Nouveau Bassin to Jonquilles.

The network is electrified at 750 V DC using overhead power collection. Services are provided by a fleet of twenty-two 32-metre-long (105 ft) Alstom Citadis 302 trams. Both the network and the trams are operated by Soléa, who also operate the city's bus network, on behalf of the Mulhouse Alsace Agglomération (MAA).

== Tram-train services ==
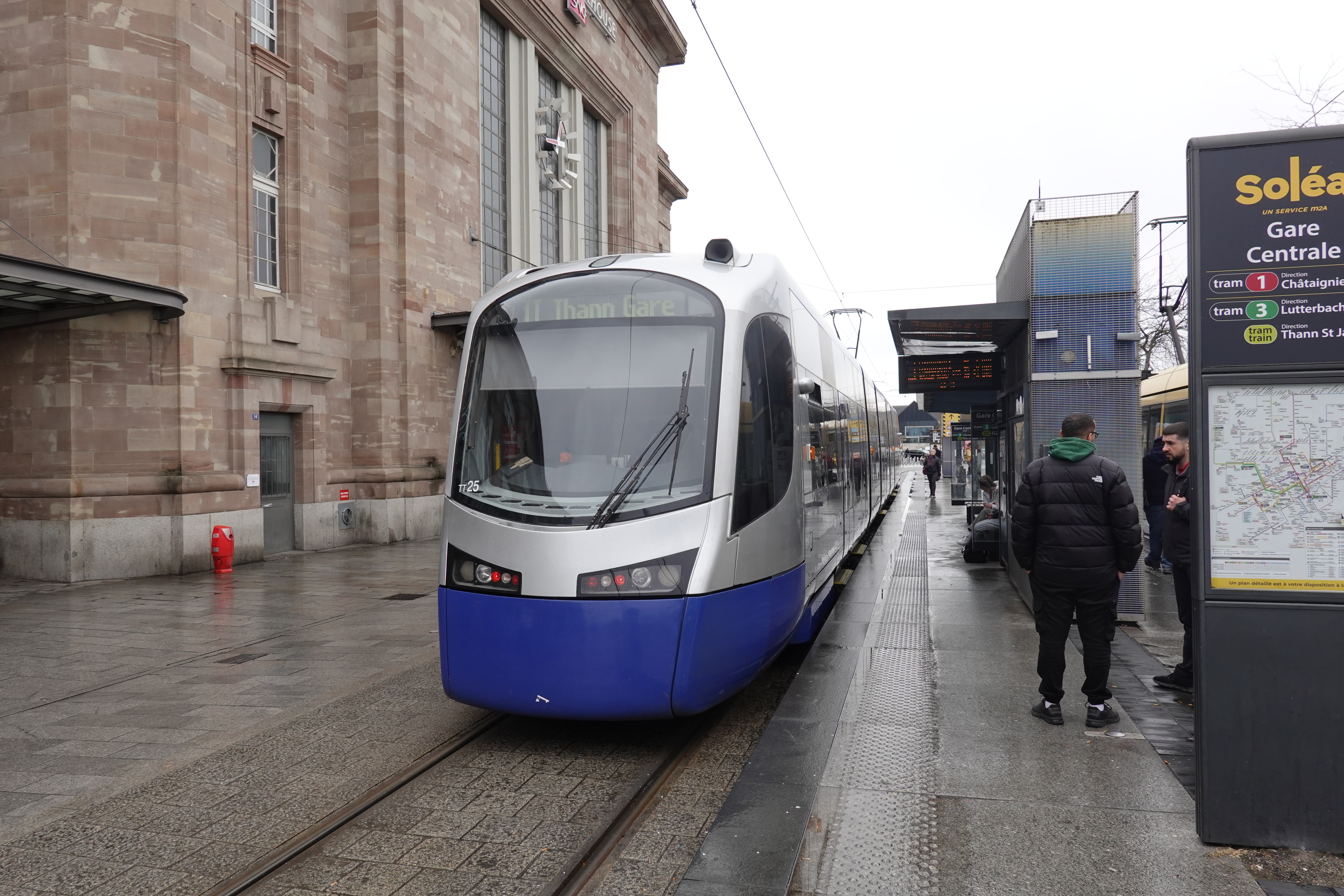
Mulhouse station

The tram-train line runs from Gare Central to Thann, with a proposed extension to Kruth. The line follows the existing tracks of lines 1 from Gare Central to Porte Jeune, and line 2 from there to Daguerre. Here it diverges onto a 4.2 kilometres (2.6 mi) section of new tram track built parallel to the Paris–Mulhouse main line railway as far as Lutterbach. This line, which is a mixture of single and double track, and electrified at 750 V DC, is used by both the tram-train service and the purely tram line 3.

At Lutterbach, a connection is made to the existing railway line to Thann and Kruth. This line is electrified at 25 kV 50 Hz AC between Lutterbach and Thann St Jacques (the former Thann Nord), and is single track with passing loops. It carries both the tram-train service and an SNCF diesel railcar service to Kruth, which uses the main railway line between Lutterbach and Gare Central. Freight trains also run at night.

A second phase of the line will involve extending the electrification as far as Kruth, allowing tram-trains to run through to there, and also allowing the SNCF to replace the diesel railcar service with an electric unit. However no timescales are in place for this.

The tram-train service uses 12 × 36.68 m-long (120 ft 4 in) Siemens Avanto tram-trains. These units were financed, and are owned, jointly by the Alsace region and the MAA. The drivers come from SNCF (75%) and Soléa (25%). The line as far as Lutterbach is Soléa's responsibility, with the SNCF taking responsibility from there to Thann and Kruth.

== See also ==
- Trams in France
- List of town tramway systems in France
