= Jean-Baptiste Schacre =

French architect

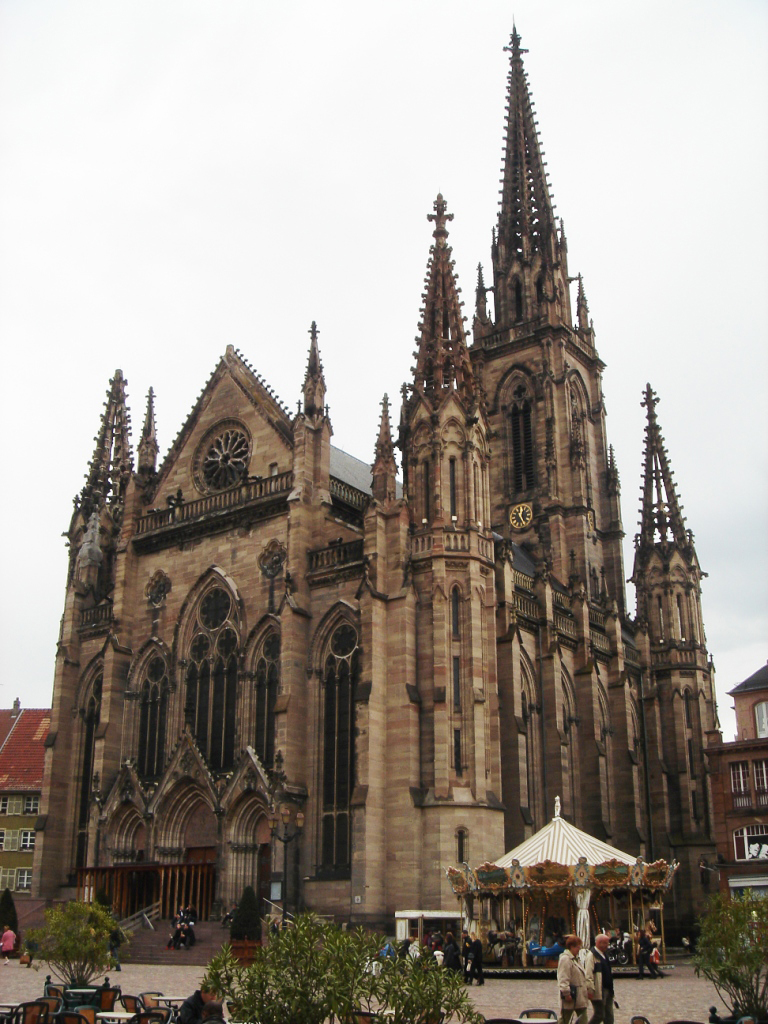
Temple Saint-Étienne, the Calvinist temple (1859-1869) of Mulhouse, with its 97-metre spire, is one of the highest Protestant religious buildings ever built in Europe.

Jean-Baptiste Schacre (1808–1876) was a French architect.

== Life ==
Born in Delle in 1808, Jean-Baptiste Schacre began his career in 1826 as a draftsman in the Ponts et Chaussées services. During that period he drew many sketches and watercolours depicting Alsatian landscapes and monuments.

Becoming Chief draftsman on the Strasbourg-Basel railway, he settled in Mulhouse in 1838, where he opened his own architectural office in 1841.

From 1844 until his death, Schacre was "architecte voyer" (city architect and road surveyor) of Mulhouse. As such he erected some significant buildings in the city, such as the synagogue (1846-1849), the Catholic Church of Saint-Steffen (Gothic revival, 1855-1860) and the Calvinist temple of Saint-Steffen (Gothic Revival, 1859-1869).

In the 1860s he designed many churches through the Department of Haut-Rhin, most of them in Romanesque Revival style. He died in Mulhouse.

== Main works ==
=== Drawings ===
- Views of alsatian romantic landscapes and medieval monuments (ruined castles, Gothic and Romanesque churches).
- Views of Sélestat for Jacques Rothmuller's lithographic album, Vues pittoresques des châteaux, monuments et sites remarquables de l'Alsace, Hahn et Vix, Colmar, 1839.

=== Architecture ===
==== Mulhouse ====
- Goose fountain (1845) (destroyed)
- Synagogue (1847-1849)
- Synagogue, Dornach (c. 1851)
- Saint-Steffen catholic church (1855-1860)
- Saint-Steffen Calvinist temple (1859-1869)
- Schools, professional high school and nursery schools (1850s-1870s)

==== Other places ====
- Gueberschwihr : church (1870-1877, reconstruction around the romanesque tower)
- Jettingen, Haut-Rhin : church (1874-1877)
- Masevaux : chapel (1870-1875)
- Pfastatt : church (1867)
- Riedisheim : town hall and school (1843-1848)
- Steinbrunn-le-Haut : town hall and school (1859-1862)
- Zillisheim : church
- Delle : church (1858-1861, reconstruction)

== Gallery ==
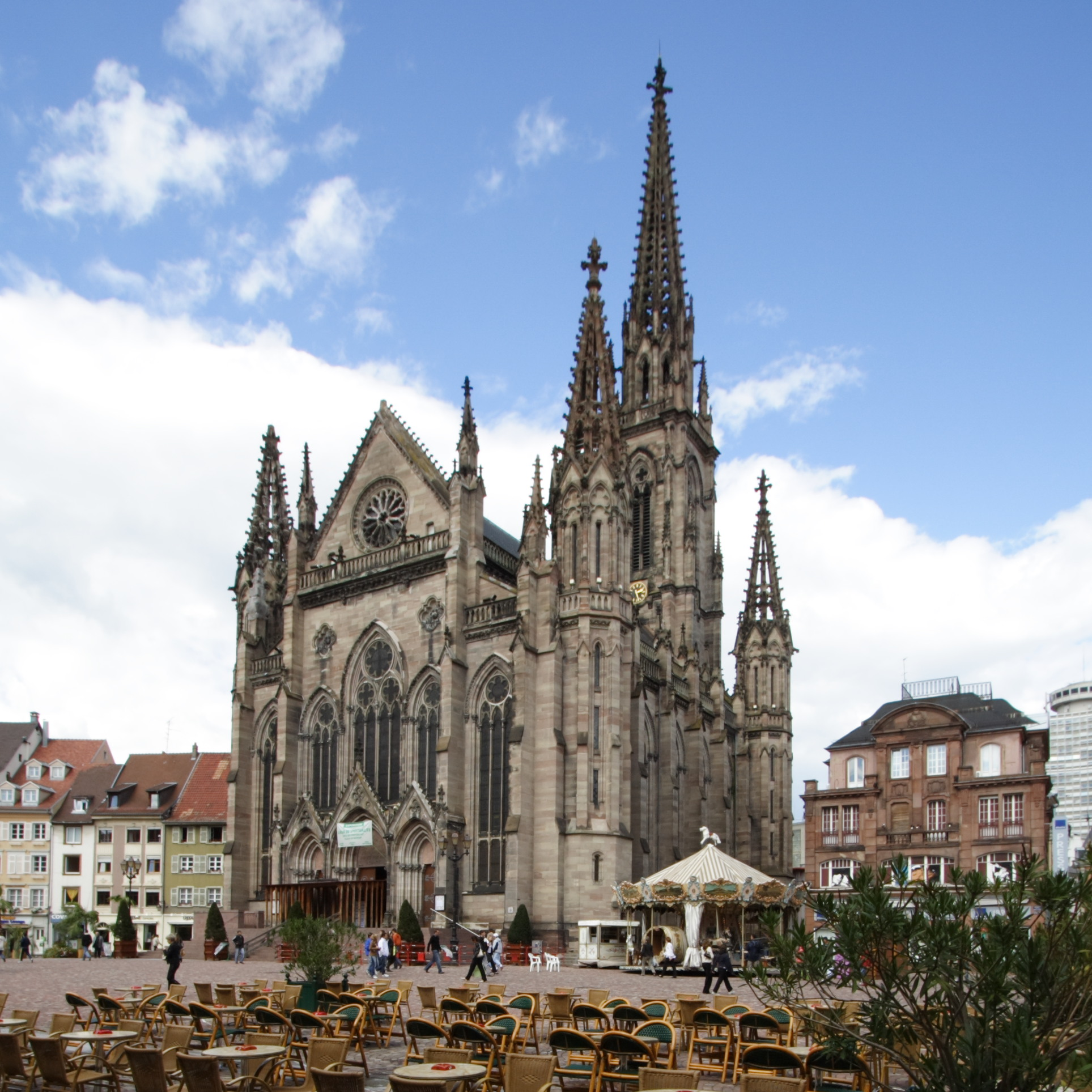
Mulhouse : Saint-Steffen Calvinist temple (1859-1869)

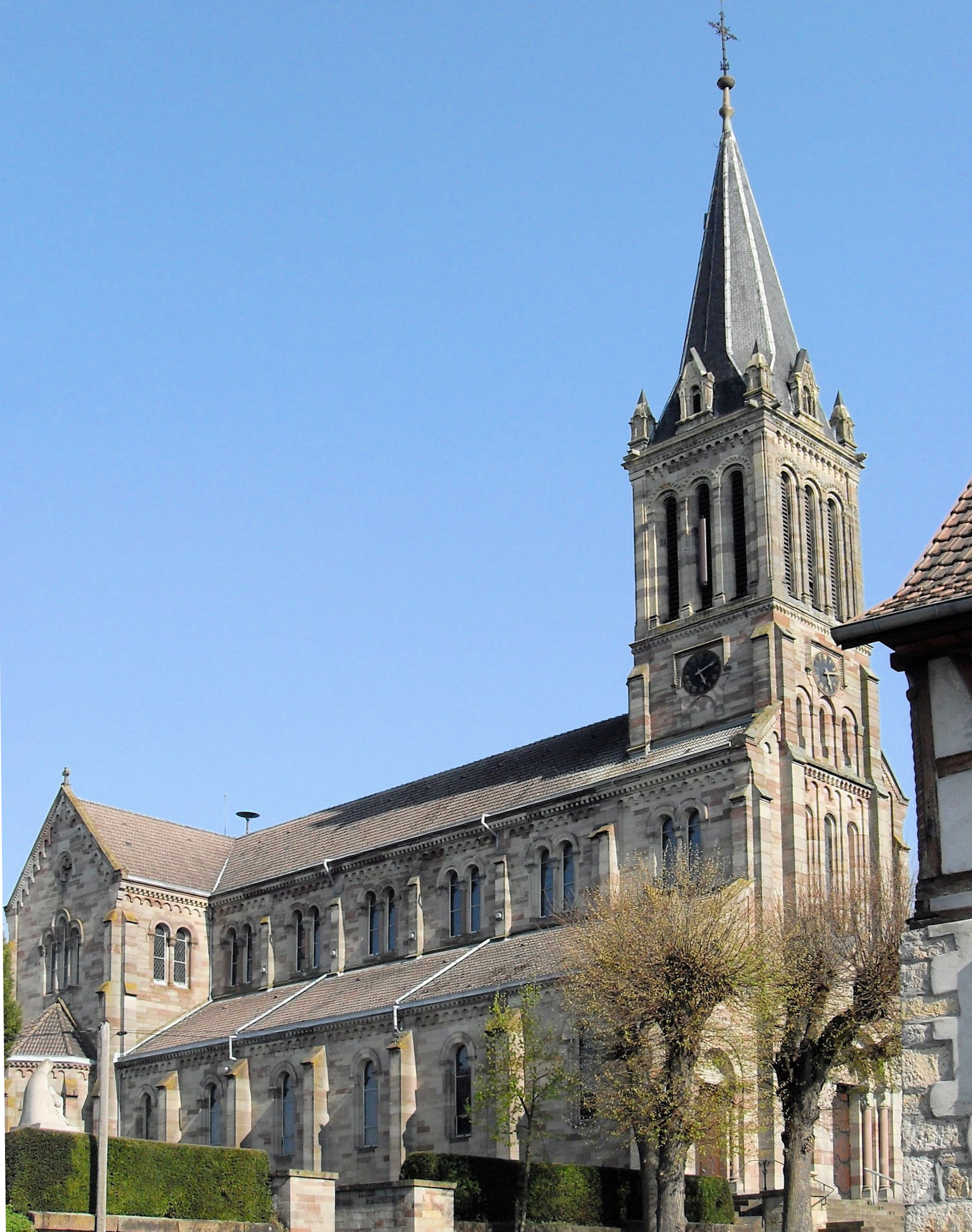
Zillisheim : church

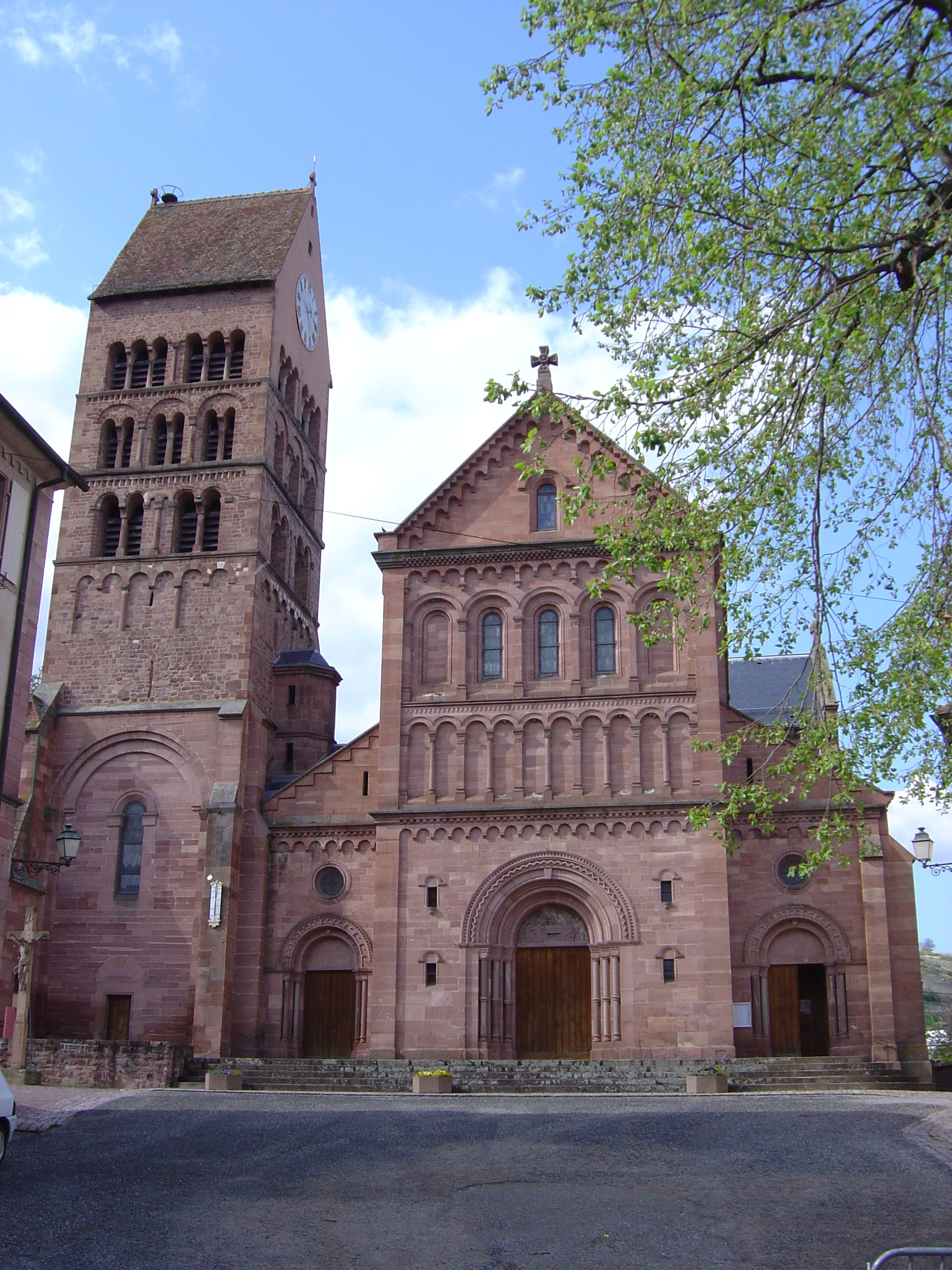
Gueberschwihr : church (the bell tower on the left is the former crossing tower of a destroyed romanesque church)
