= Véronique North-Minca =

French diplomat

- Born: December 4, 1953; Mulhouse
- Occupation: Diplomat
- Known for: Diplomatic activity
- Awards: The Order of Honour

Véronique North-Minca (born December 4, 1953, Mulhouse) is a diplomat from France. She served as the first Secretary of the French Embassy, Chişinău (2006-2010).

== Awards ==
- The Order of Honour, Moldova, 2010
