= Mulhouse =

Subprefecture and commune in Grand Est, France

Mulhouse Mìlhüsa (Alsatian)
- Subprefecture and commune
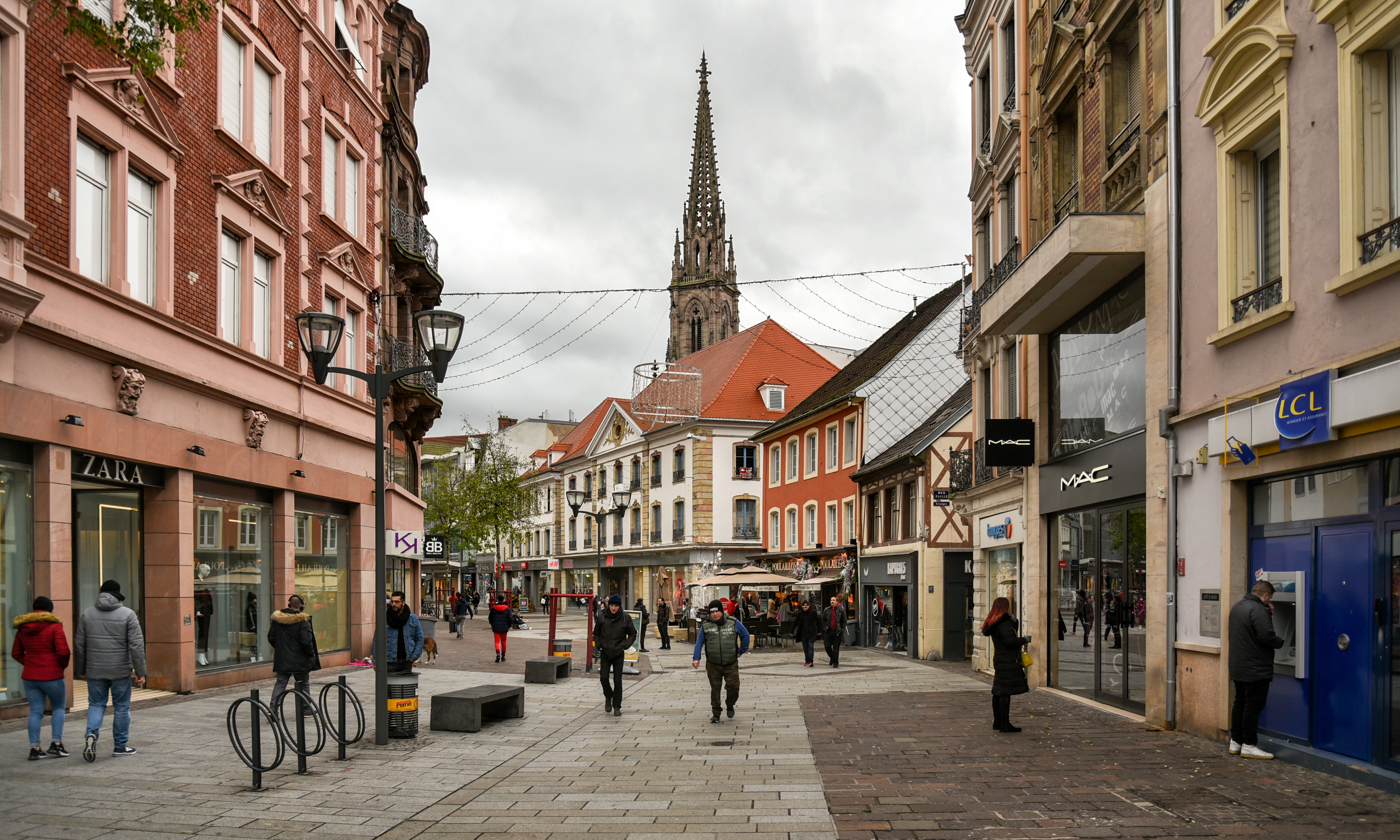
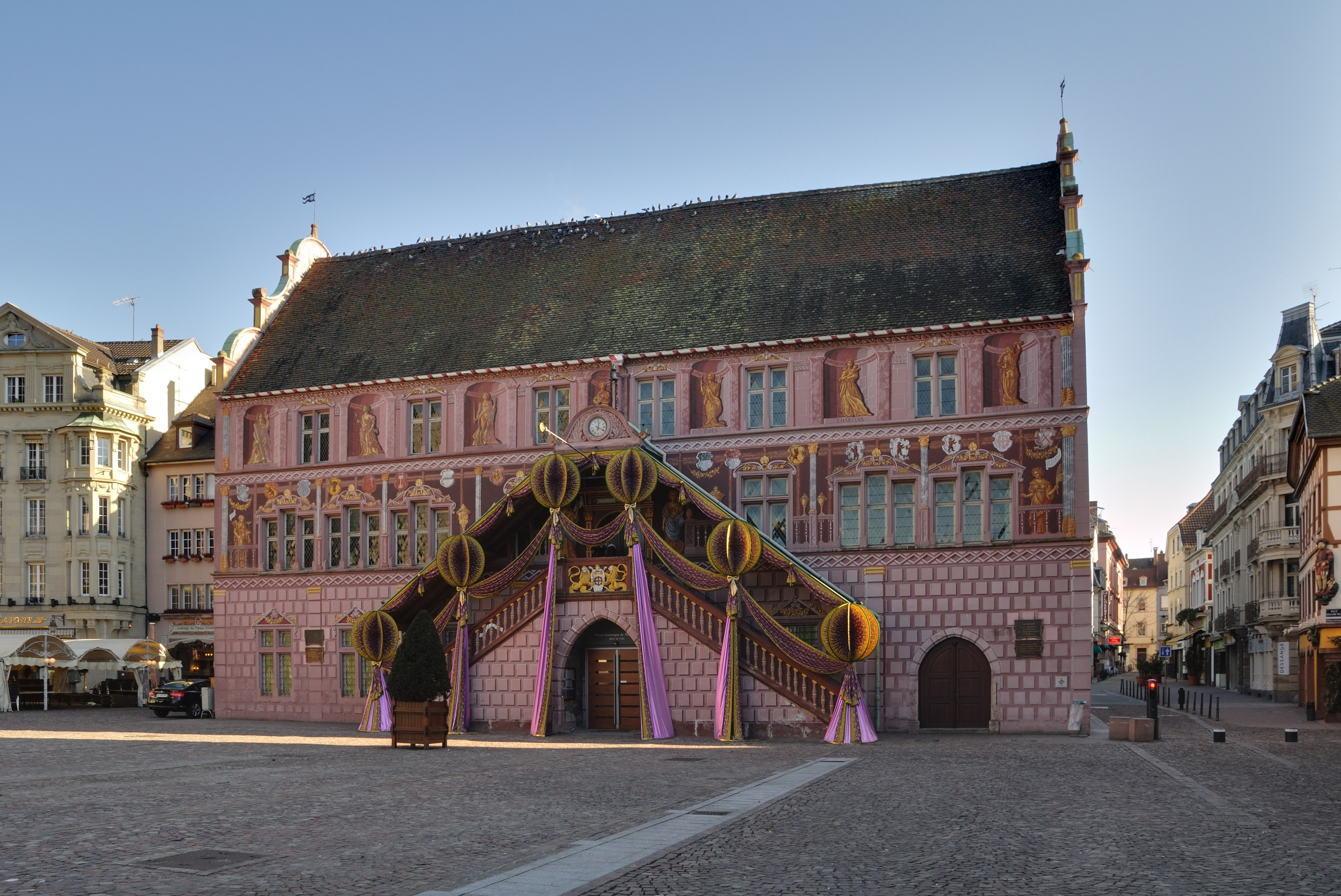
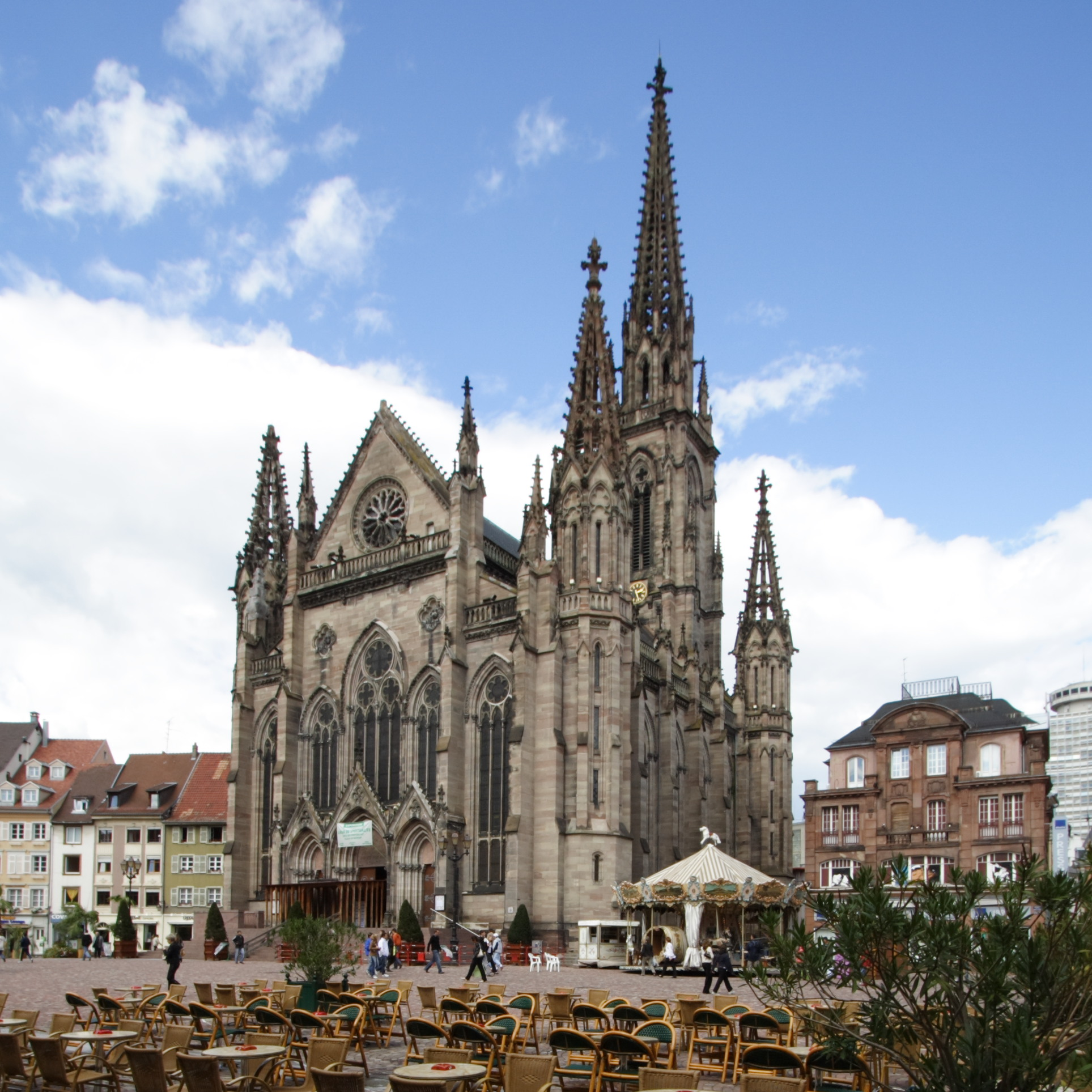
- Old town Town hall Saint Stephen's Church

- Flag Coat of arms
- Location of Mulhouse
- Location within France Location within Grand Est
- Coordinates: 47°45′N 7°20′E
- Country: France
- Region: Grand Est
- Department: Haut-Rhin
- Arrondissement: Mulhouse
- Canton: Mulhouse-1, 2 and 3
- Intercommunality: Mulhouse Alsace Agglomération

Government
  - Mayor (2026–32): Frédéric Marquet
- Area^{1}: 22.18 km^{2} (8.56 sq mi)
  - Urban: 239.1 km^{2} (92.3 sq mi)
- Elevation: 240 m (790 ft)
- Highest elevation: 338 m (1,109 ft)
- Lowest elevation: 232 m (761 ft)
- Population (2023): 104,978
  - Density: 4,733/km^{2} (12,260/sq mi)
  - Urban (2017 2021): 246,692 Metro 6,394,037 Oberrhein
  - Urban density: 1,032/km^{2} (2,672/sq mi)
- Time zone: UTC+01:00 (CET)
  - Summer (DST): UTC+02:00 (CEST)
- INSEE/Postal code: 68224 /68100, 68200
- Dialling codes: 0389, 0369
- Website: www.mulhouse.fr
- ^{1} French Land Register data, which excludes lakes, ponds, glaciers > 1 km^{2} (0.386 sq mi or 247 acres) and river estuaries.

Mulhouse (Note: English: /məˈluːz/ mə-LOOZ; French: [myluz]; Alsatian: Mìlhüsa [mɪlˈhyːsa]; German: Mülhausen [myːlˈhaʊzn̩], meaning "mill house") is a city of the European Collectivity of Alsace (Haut-Rhin department, in the Grand Est region of France). It is near the border with Switzerland and Germany. It is the largest city in Haut-Rhin and second largest in Alsace after Strasbourg.

Mulhouse is known for its museums, especially the Cité de l'Automobile (also known as the Musée national de l'automobile, 'National Museum of the Automobile') and the Cité du Train (also known as Musée Français du Chemin de Fer, 'French Museum of the Railway'), respectively the largest automobile and railway museums in Europe. An industrial town nicknamed "the French Manchester", Mulhouse is also the main seat of the Upper Alsace University, where the secretariat of the European Physical Society is found.

== Administration ==
Mulhouse is a commune with a population of 108,312 in 2019. This commune is part of an urban unit also named Mulhouse with 247,065 inhabitants in 2018.

Additionally Mulhouse commune is the principal commune of the 39 communes which make up the communauté d'agglomération of Mulhouse Alsace Agglomération (m2A, population 280,000 in 2020).

Mulhouse commune is a subprefecture, the administrative centre of the Arrondissement of Mulhouse. It is one of the most populated sub-prefectures in France.

== History ==
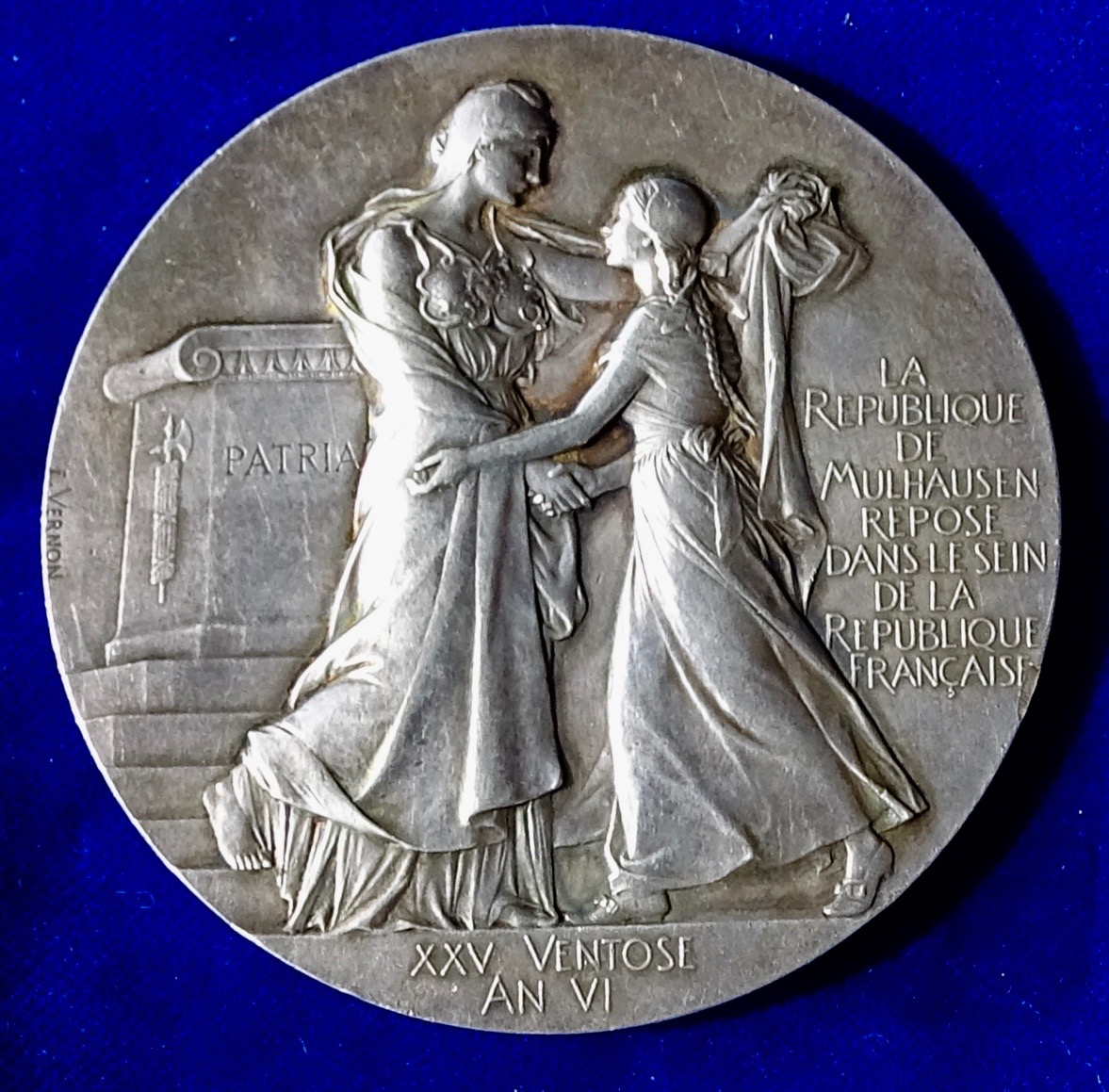
Mulhouse joining Alsace 100th anniversary medal 1898 by Frédéric Vernon, obverse

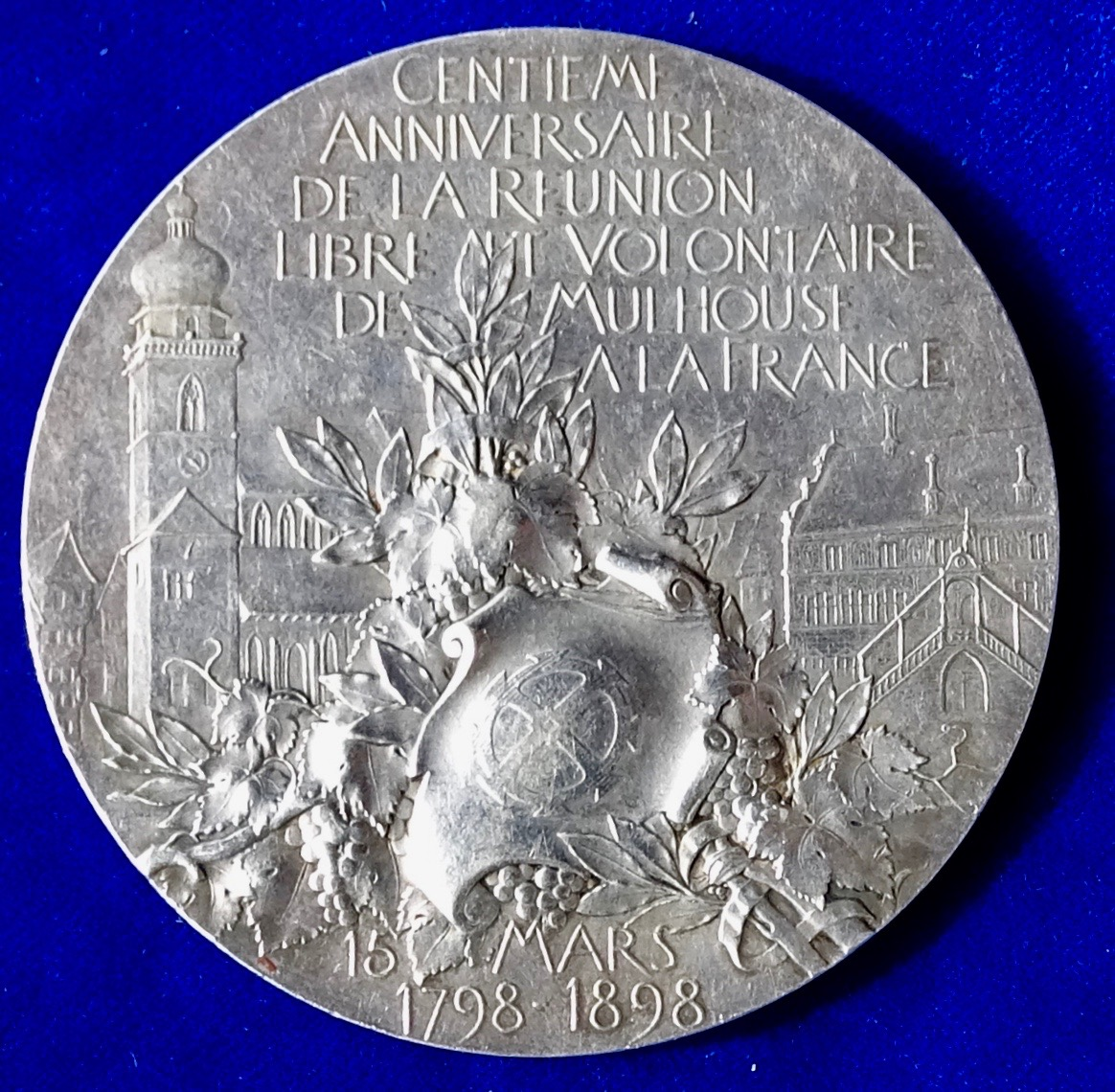
Reverse of the medal

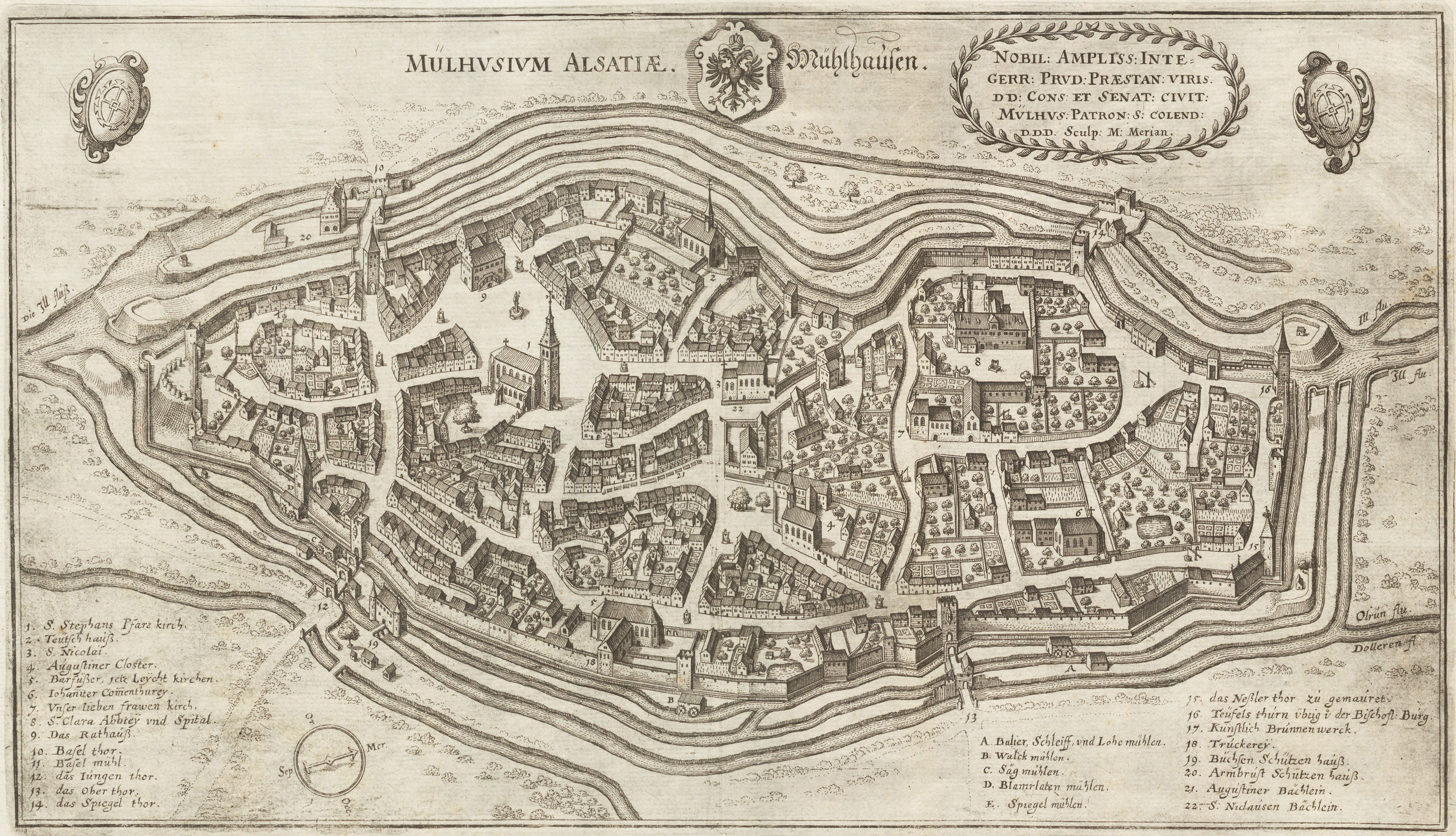
Forts of Mulhouse 1650

In 58 BC a battle took place west of Mulhouse and opposed the Roman army of Julius Caesar by a coalition of Germanic people led by Ariovistus. The first written records of the town date from the twelfth century. It was part of the southern Alsatian county of Sundgau in the Holy Roman Empire. From 1354 to 1515, Mulhouse was part of the Zehnstädtebund, an association of ten Free Imperial Cities in Alsace. The city joined the Swiss Confederation as an associate in 1515 and was therefore not annexed by France in the Peace of Westphalia in 1648 like the rest of the Sundgau. An enclave in Alsace, it was a free and independent Calvinist republic, known as Stadtrepublik Mülhausen, associated with the Swiss Confederation until, after a vote by its citizens on 4 January 1798, it became a part of France in the Treaty of Mulhouse signed on 28 January 1798, during the Directory period of the French Revolution.

The first textile printing works in Mulhouse were established in 1746 by Samuel Koechlin, Jean-Jacques Schmaltzer, Jean-Henri Dolfus and Jean-Jacques Feer. The textile printing works in the city industrialized in the 19th century and the Alsace region became a global leader in the manufacturing and marketing of printed fabric. Art and craft printed textiles were sold alongside textiles that had been finished in a complex industrial printing process. André Koechlin (1789–1875) built machinery and started making railroad equipment in 1842. The firm in 1839 already employed 1,800 people. It was one of the six large French locomotive constructors until the merger with Elsässische Maschinenbau-Gesellschaft Grafenstaden in 1872, when the company became Société Alsacienne de Constructions Mécaniques.

After the Prussian victory in the Franco-Prussian War (1870–1871), Mulhouse was annexed to the German Empire as part of the territory of Alsace-Lorraine (1871–1918). The city was briefly occupied by French troops on 8 August 1914 at the start of World War I, but they were forced to withdraw two days later in the Battle of Mulhouse. French forces then reoccupied the city again on 19 August, before retreating again on 28 August having suffered heavy casualties. Alsatians who celebrated the appearance of the French army were left to face German reprisals, with several citizens sentenced to death. After World War I ended in 1918, French troops entered Alsace, and Germany ceded the region to France under the Treaty of Versailles. After the Battle of France in 1940, it was occupied by German forces until its return to French control at the end of World War II in May 1945.

The town's development was stimulated first by the expansion of the textile industry and tanning, and subsequently by chemical and Engineering industries from the mid 18th century. Mulhouse was for a long time called the French Manchester. Consequently, the town has enduring links with Louisiana, from which it imported cotton, and also with the Levant. The town's history also explains why its centre is relatively small.

=== 2025 Mulhouse stabbing attack ===
On 22 February 2025, a 69-year-old Portuguese man, Lino Sousa Loureiro, was killed and several police officers were injured in a stabbing attack at a market in the centre of Mulhouse. A 37-year-old Algerian man, Ibrahim Abdessemed, was arrested at the scene and a terrorist inquiry was opened as the suspect reportedly shouted "Allahu Akbar" when carrying out the attack.

== Geography ==
Two rivers run through Mulhouse, the Doller and the Ill, both tributaries of the Rhine. Mulhouse is approximately 100 kilometres (62 miles) from Strasbourg and Zurich; it is 350 km (217 mi) from Milan and about 340 km (211 mi) from Frankfurt. It is close to Basel, Switzerland and Freiburg, Germany. It shares the EuroAirport international airport with these two cities.

=== Districts ===
Medieval Mulhouse consists essentially of a lower and an upper town.

- The lower town was formerly the inner city district of merchants and craftsmen. It developed around the Place de la Réunion (which commemorates its reunion with France). Nowadays this area is pedestrianised.
- The upper town developed from the eighteenth century on. Previously, several monastic orders were established there, notably the Franciscans, Augustinians, Poor Clares and Knights of Malta.
- The Nouveau Quartier (New District) is the best example of urban planning in Mulhouse, and was developed from 1826 on, after the town walls had been torn down (as they were in many towns in France). It is focused around the Place de la République. Its network of streets and its triangular shape are a good demonstration of the town's desire for a planned layout. The planning was undertaken by the architects G. Stolz and Félix Fries. This inner city district was occupied by rich families and the owners of local industries, who tended to be liberal and republican in their opinions.
- The Rebberg district consists of grand houses inspired by the colonnaded residences of Louisiana cotton planters. Originally, this was the town's vineyard (the word Rebe meaning vine in German). The houses here were built as terraces in the English style, a result of the town's close relationship with Manchester, where the sons of industrialists were often sent to study.

=== Climate ===
Mulhouse's climate is temperate oceanic (Köppen: Cfb), but its location further away from the ocean gives the city colder winters with some snow, and often hot and humid summers, in comparison with the rest of France.

Climate data for Mulhouse (1991–2020 averages)
Month	Jan	Feb	Mar	Apr	May	Jun	Jul	Aug	Sep	Oct	Nov	Dec	Year
Record high °C (°F)	18.8 (65.8)	21.7 (71.1)	26.2 (79.2)	30.0 (86.0)	33.0 (91.4)	37.0 (98.6)	38.8 (101.8)	39.1 (102.4)	33.7 (92.7)	31.0 (87.8)	23.4 (74.1)	19.9 (67.8)	39.1 (102.4)
Mean daily maximum °C (°F)	5.5 (41.9)	7.4 (45.3)	12.1 (53.8)	16.5 (61.7)	20.4 (68.7)	24.2 (75.6)	26.4 (79.5)	26.1 (79.0)	21.4 (70.5)	16.0 (60.8)	9.7 (49.5)	6.1 (43.0)	16.0 (60.8)
Daily mean °C (°F)	2.3 (36.1)	3.4 (38.1)	7.0 (44.6)	10.7 (51.3)	14.8 (58.6)	18.5 (65.3)	20.3 (68.5)	20.0 (68.0)	15.8 (60.4)	11.4 (52.5)	6.2 (43.2)	3.1 (37.6)	11.1 (52.0)
Mean daily minimum °C (°F)	−0.8 (30.6)	−0.6 (30.9)	1.9 (35.4)	4.9 (40.8)	9.3 (48.7)	12.7 (54.9)	14.2 (57.6)	14.0 (57.2)	10.2 (50.4)	6.9 (44.4)	2.8 (37.0)	0.1 (32.2)	6.3 (43.3)
Record low °C (°F)	−23.5 (−10.3)	−22.8 (−9.0)	−16.4 (2.5)	−6.3 (20.7)	−3.1 (26.4)	1.8 (35.2)	5.1 (41.2)	3.4 (38.1)	−0.9 (30.4)	−6.3 (20.7)	−12.6 (9.3)	−18.7 (−1.7)	−23.5 (−10.3)
Average precipitation mm (inches)	46.1 (1.81)	43.9 (1.73)	47.4 (1.87)	57.6 (2.27)	86.6 (3.41)	74.5 (2.93)	72.0 (2.83)	80.0 (3.15)	63.5 (2.50)	68.5 (2.70)	60.8 (2.39)	63.4 (2.50)	764.3 (30.09)
Average precipitation days (≥ 1.0 mm)	9.1	8.6	9.1	9.4	11.2	10.0	10.1	10.1	9.0	10.5	10.0	10.7	117.8
Mean monthly sunshine hours	68.4	91.2	145.6	181.1	201.9	228.2	247.5	233.8	168.4	120.9	70.2	62.1	1,819.1
Source: Meteociel

Comparison of local Meteorological data with other cities in France
Town	Sunshine (hours/yr)	Rain (mm/yr)	Snow (days/yr)	Storm (days/yr)	Fog (days/yr)
National average	1,973	770	14	22	40
Mulhouse	1,783.8	772.1	32.5	33.2	54.9
Paris	1,661	637	12	18	10
Nice	2,724	767	1	29	1
Strasbourg	1,693	665	29	29	56
Brest	1,605	1,211	7	12	75

== Population ==
The population data in the table and graph below refer to the commune of Mulhouse proper, in its geography at the given years. The commune of Mulhouse absorbed the former commune of Dornach in 1914 and Bourtzwiller in 1947.

Historical population

Year	Pop.	±% p.a.
1793	3,763	—
1800	6,018	+6.94%
1806	8,053	+4.97%
1821	9,603	+1.18%
1831	13,300	+3.31%
1836	16,932	+4.95%
1841	20,129	+3.52%
1846	29,415	+7.88%
1851	29,574	+0.11%
1856	45,981	+9.23%
1861	45,587	−0.17%
1866	58,773	+5.21%
1872	52,892	−1.74%
1876	58,513	+2.56%
1881	63,629	+1.69%
1886	69,759	+1.86%
1891	76,892	+1.97%
1896	82,986	+1.54%
1901	89,118	+1.44%

Year	Pop.	±% p.a.
1906	94,498	+1.18%
1911	95,041	+0.11%
1921	99,226	+0.43%
1926	99,892	+0.13%
1931	99,534	−0.07%
1936	96,697	−0.58%
1946	87,655	−0.98%
1954	99,079	+1.54%
1962	108,995	+1.20%
1968	116,336	+1.09%
1975	117,013	+0.08%
1982	112,157	−0.60%
1990	108,357	−0.43%
1999	110,359	+0.20%
2007	111,394	+0.12%
2012	110,755	−0.11%
2017	109,443	−0.24%
2023	104,978	−0.69%

Source: EHESS and INSEE (since 1968)

== Main sights ==
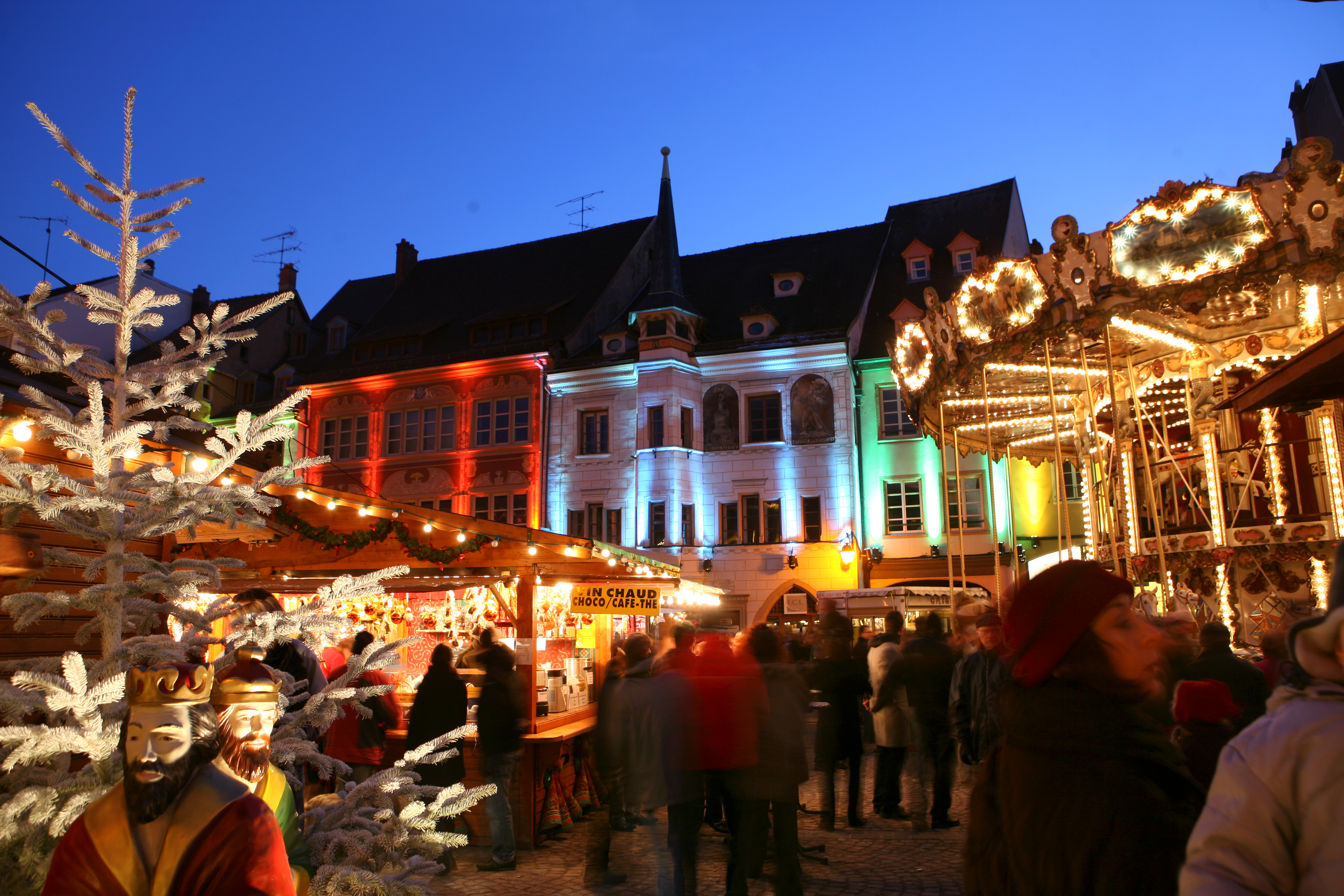
Christmas market in Mulhouse

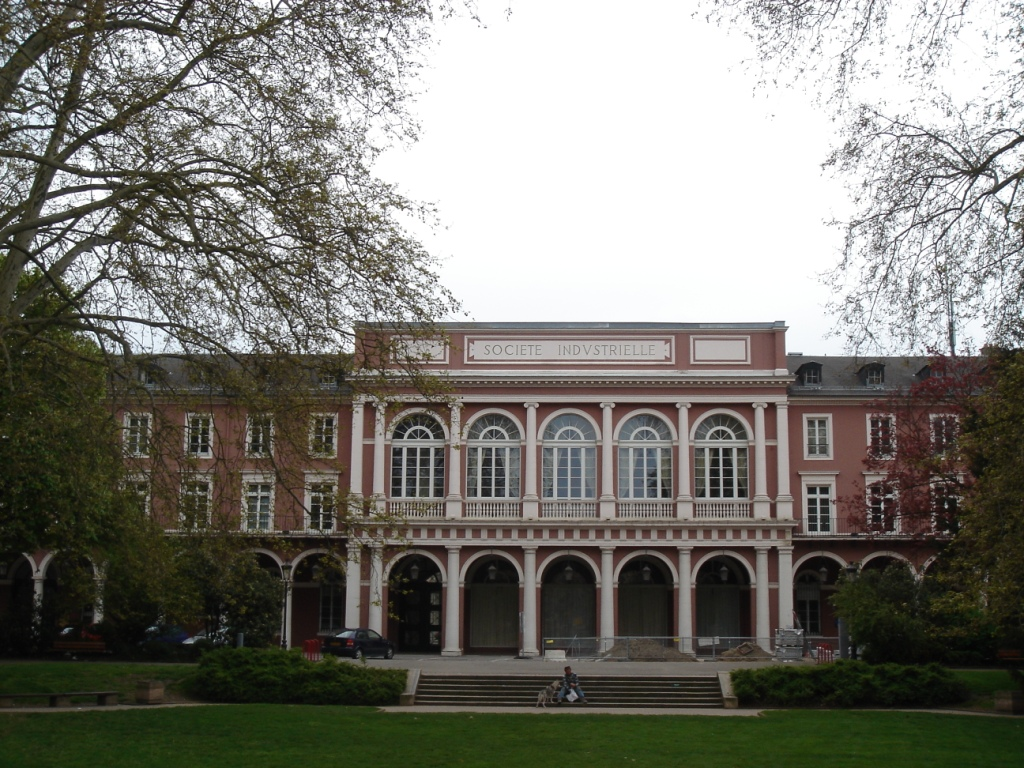
Société Industrielle building

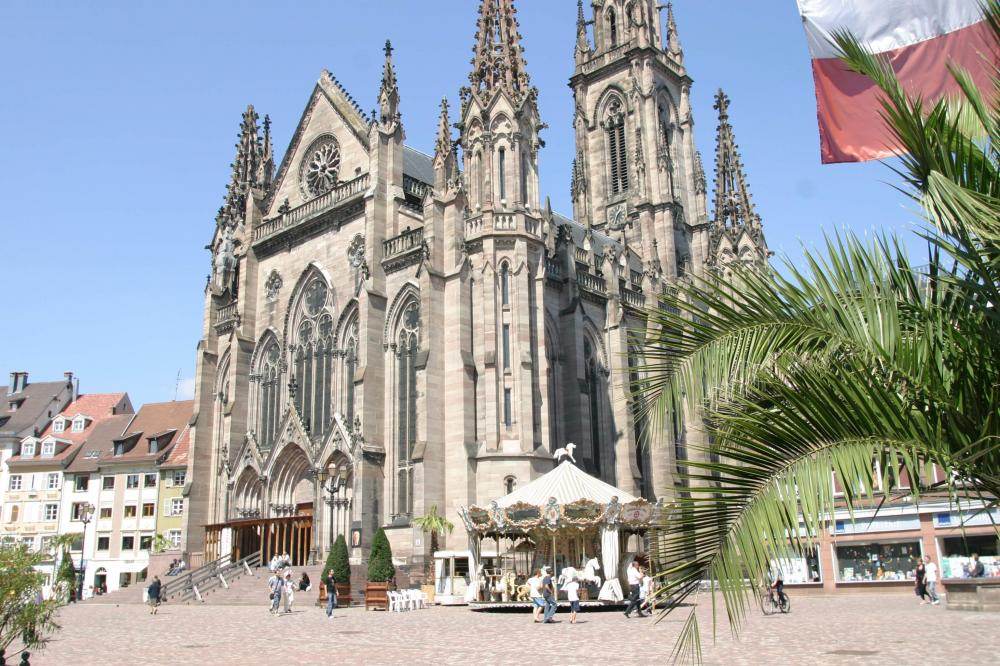
Temple Saint-Étienne on the Place de la Réunion

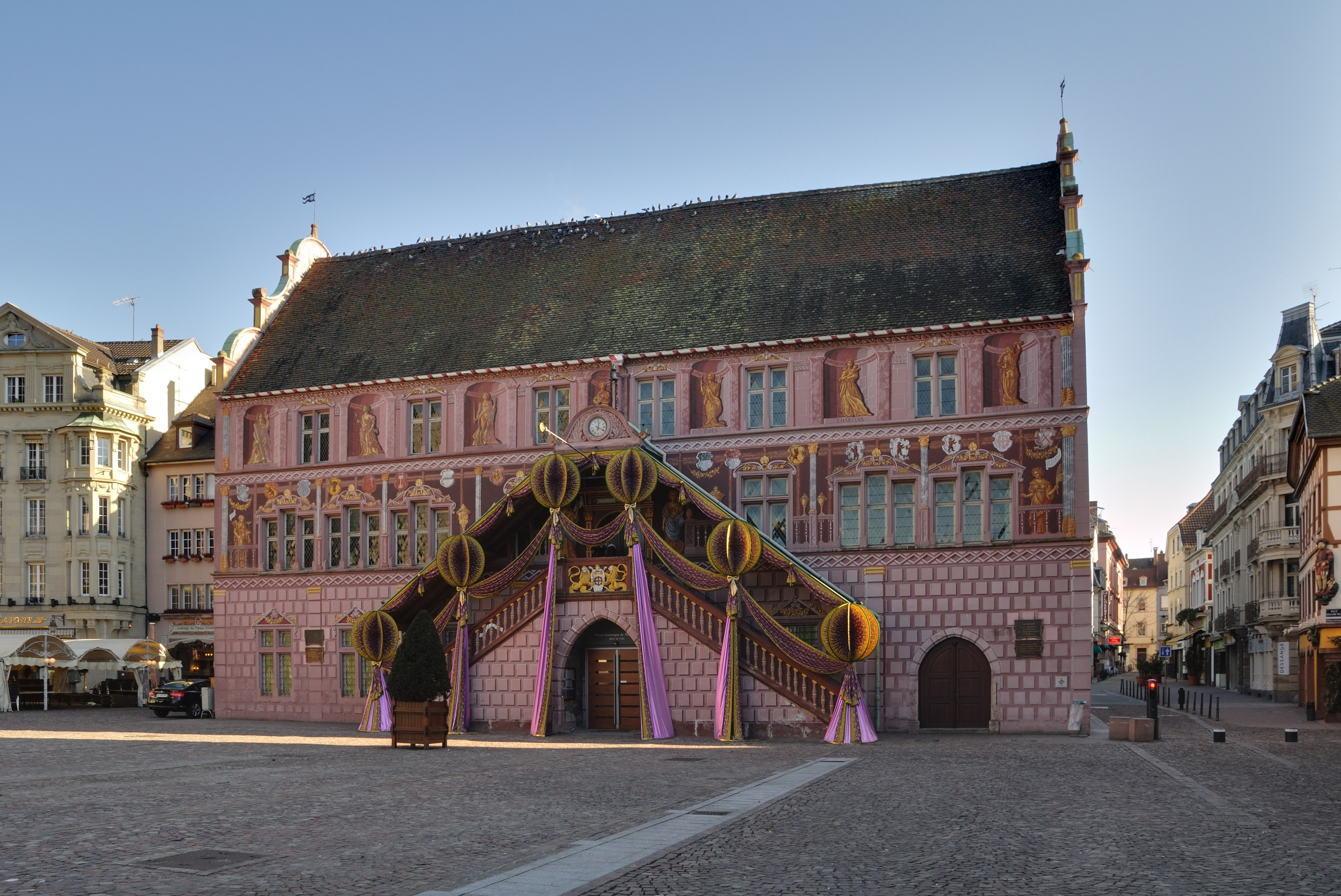
Hôtel de Ville (Rothüs in Alsatian)

- Hôtel de Ville (1552). The town hall was built in 1553 in the Rhenish Renaissance style. Montaigne described it as a "palais magnifique et tout doré" ("splendid golden palace") in 1580. It is known for its trompe-l'œil paintings, and its pictures of allegories representing the vices and virtues.
- Workers' quarter (mid 19th century), inspired workers' quarters in many other industrial towns.
- Place de la Bourse and the building of the Société Industrielle de Mulhouse, in the Nouveau Quartier (19th century)
- Cité de l'Automobile (featuring the Schlumpf collection)
- Cité du Train successor to Musée Français du Chemin de Fer (French National Railway Museum)
- Museum of Electricity (Electropolis)
- Musée des Beaux-Arts (Fine Arts Museum)
- Musée historique (History Museum, located in the Hôtel de Ville)
- Museum of Printed Textiles (Musée de l'impression sur étoffes)
- The Parc Zoologique et Botanique de Mulhouse (botanical garden and zoo)
- Saint-Steffen Calvinist temple (1859–1869), by Jean-Baptiste Schacre
- Miscellaneous street art works all around the town, amongst them a picture of Milhouse van Houten from The Simpsons as his name is pronounced similarly to Mulhouse in the French-dubbed version.

== Principal economic activities ==
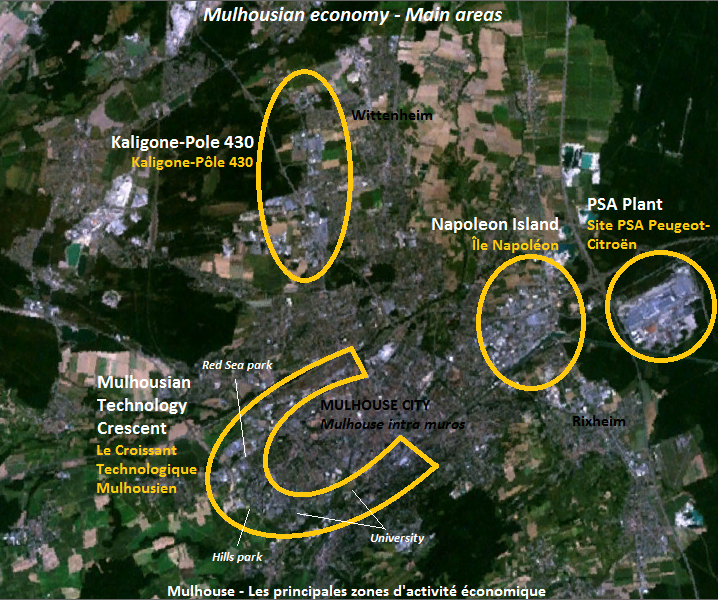
Main commercial areas

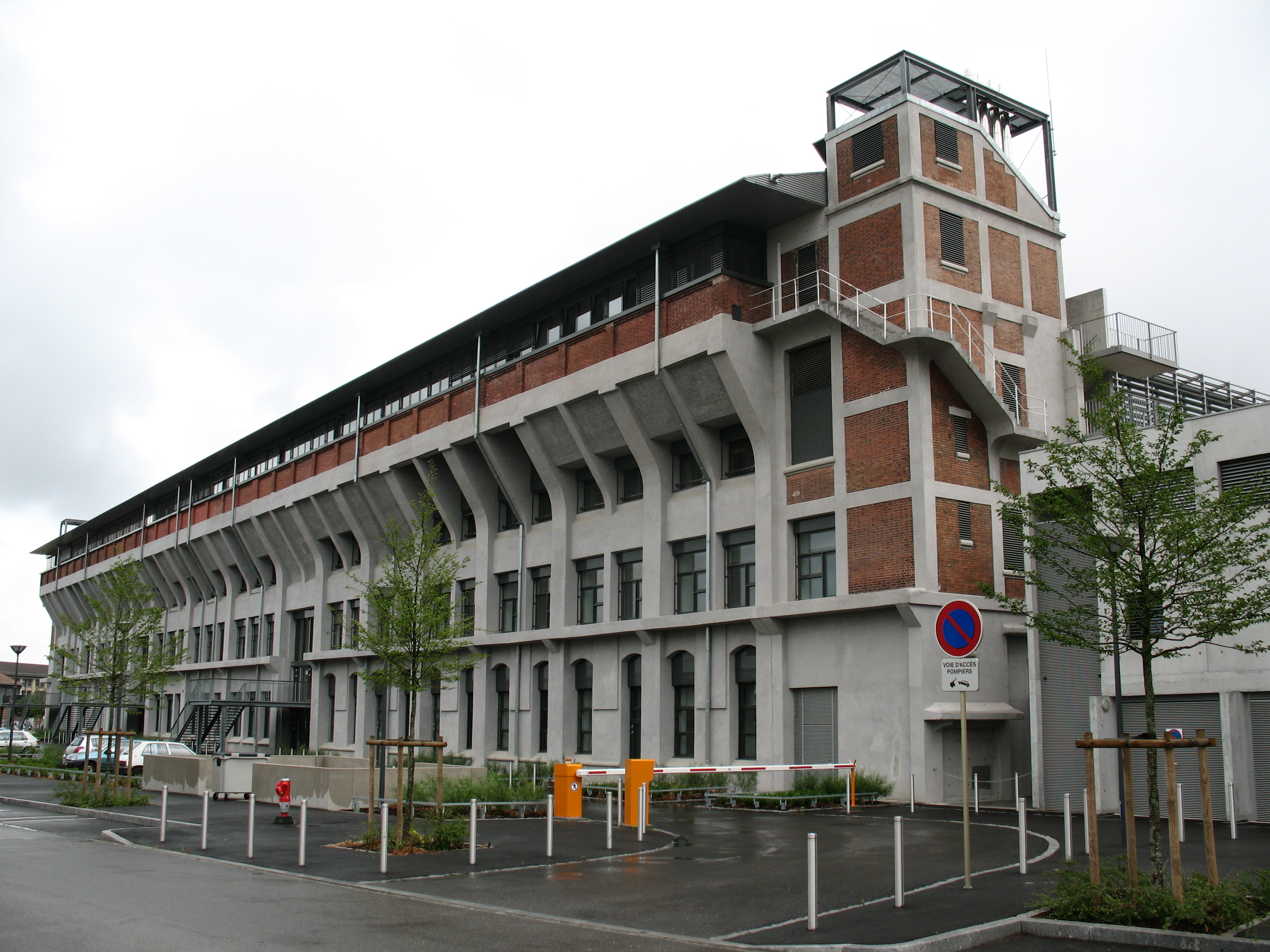
Campus "La Fonderie" of the Upper Alsace University

As early as the mid-19th century, Mulhouse was known as "the industrial capital of Alsace", the "city with a hundred chimneys" (cité aux cent cheminées) and "the French Manchester".

- Automobile industry (Peugeot's Mulhouse factory is the largest employer in Alsace)
- Chemical industry (ICMD)
- Electronics (Clemessy)
- Engineering (SACM – Wärtsilä)

Between 1909 and 1914 there was an aircraft manufacturer, Aviatik, in Mulhouse.

== Education ==
The École nationale supérieure de chimie de Mulhouse, the first school of Chemistry in France, is located in the city.

== Media ==
Mulhouse receives most French television channels from the local TV transmitter. For regional television, the city is covered by France 3 Alsace that broadcast from Strasbourg on channel France 3 which is part of France's national public broadcaster, France Télévisions. Due to the proximity to Germany, many German channels (ARD, ZDF, SWR and RTL) can also be received in the city.

Local radio stations that broadcast to Mulhouse are Ici Alsace, Radio Dreyeckland, and Radio ECN.

Two main local newspapers are L'Alsace and Dernières Nouvelles d'Alsace.

== Transport ==
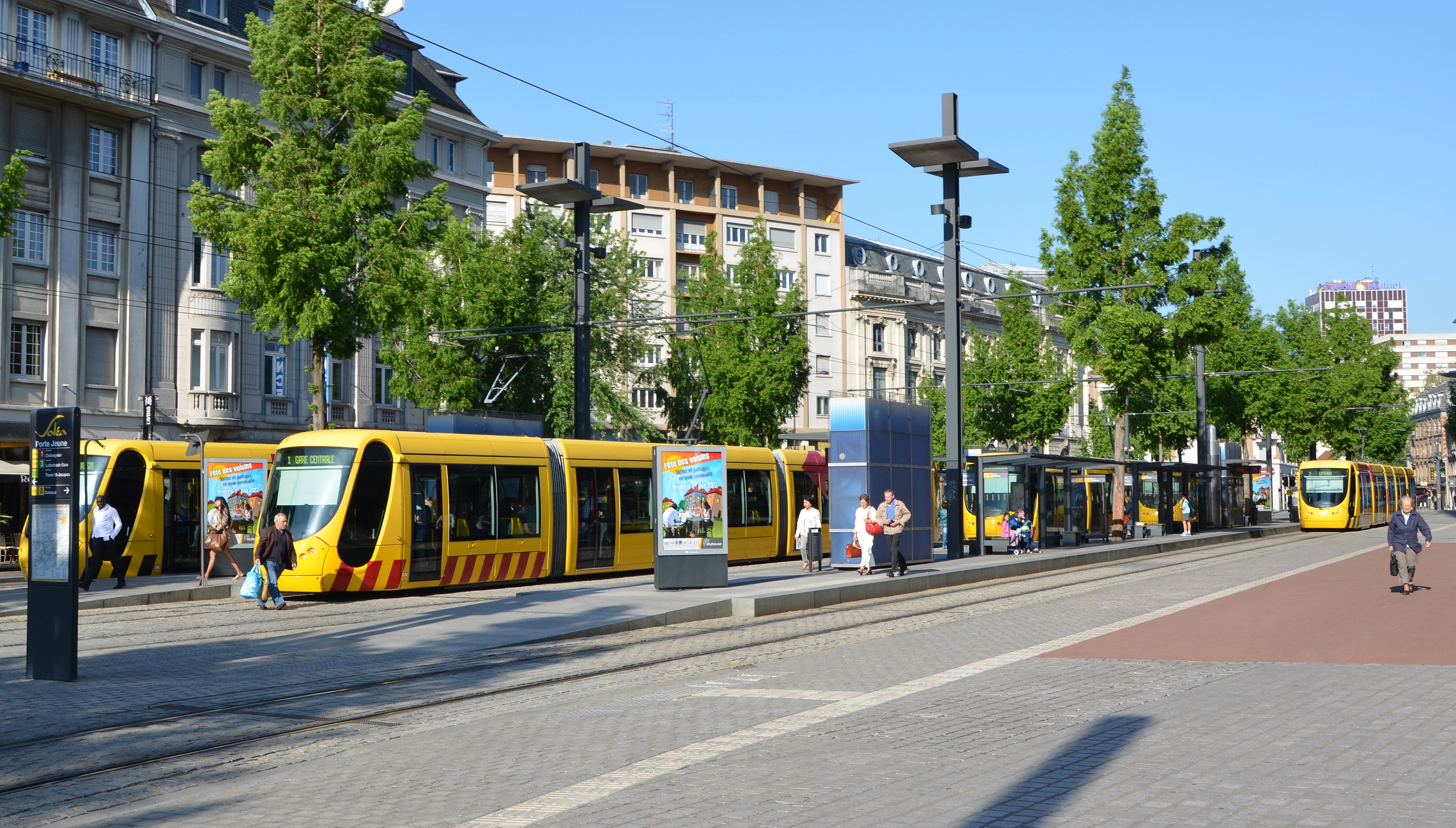
Tram in Mulhouse

=== Air ===
Mulhouse is served by EuroAirport Basel-Mulhouse-Freiburg, located 25 km (16 mi) south of the town.

=== Rail ===
Gare de Mulhouse is well connected with the rest of France by train, including major destinations such as Paris, Dijon, Besançon, Belfort, Strasbourg, Lyon, Marseille, Montpellier and Lille. Some trains operate to destinations in Switzerland, in particular proximity Basel, Bern and Zurich. There is also a train service to Frankfurt am Main in Germany, and a Eurocity service that connects Brussels, Luxembourg, Strasbourg and Basel calls at Mulhouse.

Regional services connect Mulhouse to Colmar, Strasbourg, Basel, Belfort, Kruth and Freiburg im Breisgau.

=== Urban transport ===
Transport within Mulhouse is provided by Soléa and comprises a network of buses together with the city's tram network, which opened on 13 May 2006. The tramway now consists of three tram lines and one tram-train line.

- Line 2 from Nouveau Bassin to Coteaux
- Line 1 from Gare Centrale to Châtaignier
- Line 3 from Gare Centrale to Lutterbach
- Tram-train line from Gare Centrale to Thann via Lutterbach

=== Road ===
Motorway A36 is the main axis connecting the city with the west of the country, to cities such as Dijon, Paris and Lyon. The A35 is the main north–south axis, connecting cities such as Strasbourg and Basel.

== Sports ==
Mulhouse is one of the nation's hubs for women's volleyball. ASPTT Mulhouse won multiple titles at the National level. The team plays its home games at the Palais des Sports.

Additionally, FC Mulhouse Basket is based in Mulhouse.

== People ==
Mulhouse was the birthplace of:

- Maurice Achener (1881–1963), French illustrator, painter, and print maker
- Jean de Beaugrand (1584–1640), lineographer and mathematician
- Serge Blenner (born 1955), composer and synthesist
- Bernard Bloch (born 1949), actor and director
- Jean Brenner (1937–2009), painter
- Karl Brandt (1904–1948), German Nazi personal physician to Adolf Hitler and head administrator of the T-4 Euthanasia Program, executed for war crimes
- David Cage (born 1969), French video game designer, writer and musician. Born in Mulhouse, Cage was the first game developer to receive the Legion of Honour, the highest decoration granted in France.
- Pierre Chambon (born 1931), biologist
- Cléopatre Darleux (born 1989), handball goalkeeper
- Mireille Delunsch (born 1962), soprano
- Tom Dillmann (born 1989), racing driver
- Artur Dinter (1876–1948), writer and Nazi politician
- Dorian Diring (born 1992), footballer
- Adrien Dollfus (1858–1921), French zoologist and carcinologist
- Jean Dollfus (1800–1887), French industrialist
- Jean Dorst (1924–2001), ornithologist
- Alfred Dreyfus (1859–1935), French military officer best known for being the focus of the Dreyfus affair
- Huguette Dreyfus (1928–2016), harpsichordist
- Léon Ehrhart (1854–1875), composer
- Yann Ehrlacher (born 1996), racing driver
- Nusch Éluard (1906–1946), performer, model and surrealist artist
- François Florent (born François Eichholtzer, 1937), actor, founder of the Cours Florent
- Georges Friedel (1865–1933), mineralogist, son of Charles Friedel
- Charles Frédéric Girard (1822–1895), biologist specializing on ichthyology and herpetology
- Pierre Haffner (1718–1760), film critic
- Jean-Gaspard Heilmann (1718–1760), painter
- Jean-Jacques Heilmann (1822–1859), photographer
- Friedrich Janz (1898–1964), diplomat
- Daniel Jelensperger (1799–1831), musicologist
- Katia and Maurice Krafft, volcanologists
- Johann Heinrich Lambert (1728–1777), mathematician, physicist and astronomer
- Joffrey Lauvergne (born 1991), basketball player
- Friedrich Wilhelm Levi (1888–1966), mathematician
- François Loeser (born 1958), mathematician
- Paul Meyer (born 1965), clarinetist
- Hervé Milazzo (born 1975), professional footballer
- Véronique North-Minca (born 1953), diplomat
- Philippe Muller (born 1946), french cellist
- Thierry Omeyer (born 1976), handball goalkeeper
- Marc Pfertzel (born 1981), football player
- Rémy Pflimlin (1954–2016), CEO of France Télévisions from 2010 to 2015
- Pierre Probst (1913–2007), comic and children book artist
- Napoléon Henri Reber (1807–1880), composer
- John Loretz (1840–1908), organist and composer
- Claire Roman (1906–1941), French Air Force pilot in World War II
- Daniel Roth (born 1942), organist, composer and pedagogue
- Franz Eugen Schlachter (1859–1911), revivalist preacher, classical scholar, and translator of the Schlachter Bible
- Christiane Scrivener (1925–2024), EU-Commissioner
- Daniel Schlumberger (1904–1972), archaeologist and professor of Near Eastern Archaeology at the University of Strasbourg and later Princeton University
- Françoise Urban-Menninger (born 1953), writer
- Jean Schlumberger (1907–1987), jewelry designer at Tiffany & Co
- René Schützenberger (1860–1916), painter
- Jules Siegfried born Mulhouse in 1837, industrialist and politician, French Minister of Commerce 1892–3
- Rémy Stricker (1936–2019), musicologist
- Frank Ténot (1925–2004), press agent, pataphysician and jazz critic
- Philippe Tondre (born 1989), oboist
- Thomas Trauttmann (born 1991), basketball player
- Vitaa (born 1983), singer
- Pierre Weiss (1865–1940), physicist
- Alfred Werner (1866–1919), Nobel Prize in Chemistry 1913
- Jules Auguste Wiernsberger (1857–1925), composer and conductor
- Paul Wolff (1887–1951), photographer
- Robert Wyler (1900–1971), film producer
- William Wyler (1902–1981), award-winning motion picture director
- Jean-Marc Savelli (born at Mulhouse in 1955), a virtuoso concert pianist
- Antar Yahia (born 1982), football player
- Georges Zipélius (1808–1890), illustrator

Other residents include:

- Adolphe Braun (1812–1877), photographer
- Alfred de Glehn (1848–1936), designer of steam locomotives

== Twin towns—sister cities ==
Mulhouse is twinned with:

- (United Kingdom) Walsall, England, since 1953
- Antwerp, Belgium, since 1956
- Kassel, Germany, since 1965
- Bergamo, Italy, since 1989
- Chemnitz, Germany, since 1990
- Giv'atayim, Israel, since 1991
- Timișoara, Romania, since 1991
- Jining, China, since 1996

== See also ==
- Dornach (Mulhouse)
