= Gabrielle Ritter-Ciampi =

French operatic soprano

Gabrielle Ritter-Ciampi (November 2, 1886 – July 18, 1974) was a French operatic soprano.

Ritter was born in Paris, her brother was the pianist Marcel Ciampi. The niece of Théodore Ritter, she originally trained as a pianist, and at age 16 she started to receive singing lessons from her parents: her Italian father, tenor Enzo Ciampi-Cellai, and French mother, Cécile Ritter-Ciampi. She debuted in 1917 as Violetta in La Traviata, and two years later she was engaged at Opéra-Comique, where she became famous in Mozart operatic roles. Her activity was centered predominantly in France, but she took part also in the Salzburg Festival in 1932, again in Mozart roles.

She was considered a fine, light lyric soprano with good technique and capable of reaching high notes easily; she was frequently compared with Adelina Patti, who had a similar voice.

She did most of her recordings between 1923 and 1929, and recorded many selected arias from various works, but never complete operas. She also sang the title role in Esclarmonde at Opéra Garnier during a short-lived revival of that opera between 1931 and 1934.

Her career practically ended with World War II, with her last engagement being a role in an operetta by Reynaldo Hahn, Le oui des jeunes filles, in 1949.
