= Léon Ehrhart =

French composer (1854–1875)

Léon Ehrhart (11 May 1854 – 4 October 1875) was a French composer.

== Life ==
Born in Mulhouse (Alsace), Ehrhart had his first music lessons in his hometown with Joseph Heyberger. He then became an organ student of Charles-Alexis Chauvet in Paris and at the Conservatoire de Paris a student of François Benoist, with whom he studied composition. In 1874, he won the Premier Grand Prix de Rome with the cantata Acis et Galatée with a libretto by Eugène Adenis.

At this time, he composed the "musical prologue" La Muse populaire for the opening of the Théâtre Lyrique. At the beginning of 1875, he embarked on the Prix de Rome trip to the Villa Medici in Rome. There he composed an oratorio and the opéra comique Maître Martin.

In September of that year, Ehrhart travelled to Venice, where he became infected with malaria. He became seriously ill on his way back to Rome. He had to interrupt his journey at Porretta near Florence, where he died. A cunning aneurysm of the aortic arch was diagnosed as the cause of death.
