= Théodore Ritter =

French composer and pianist

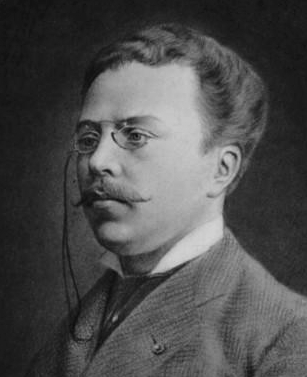
- Théodore Ritter (drawing by A. Barbé)
- Born: Toussaint Prévost; 5 April 1840; Nantes, France
- Died: 6 April 1886 (aged 46); Paris, France
- Occupations: Composer; Pianist
- Spouse: Alice Desgranges

Toussaint Prévost, known under the pseudonym Théodore Ritter (5 April 1840 – 6 April 1886) was a 19th-century French composer and pianist.

== Biography ==
The son of composer Eugène Prévost, he was a student of Hector Berlioz. He began his career as a baritone singer at La Monnaie in Brussels under the name Félix, then studied the piano with Franz Liszt. He quickly became a renowned pianist and began an international career under the name "Théodore Ritter".

A member of the "Société des derniers concerts de Beethoven" (1860), he undertook a concert tour in Canada and the US with the violinist Frantz Jehin-Prume and the operatic singer Carlotta Patti in 1869–1870.

Among others, he was the teacher of Isidore Philipp and Samuel Sanford.

Married with the singer Alice Desgranges; his niece Gabrielle Ritter-Ciampi was also famous as a singer.

A chevalier of the Légion d'honneur (1880), he is buried at cimetière du Père-Lachaise (20th division)

He composed numerous pieces for piano and transcriptions, as well as piano versions of L'enfance du Christ and Roméo et Juliette by Berlioz .

== Bibliography ==
- Émile Maillard: Nantes et le département au XIXe siècle (1891), p. 199, ISBN 1274696216.
- Henry Charles Lahee: Famous pianists of today and yesterday (1901), p. 335, ISBN 1164071394.
- Georges d'Heylli: Dictionnaire des pseudonymes (1977), p. 377–378, ISBN 978-5880613021.
