= Temple Saint-Étienne =

Coordinates: 47°44′50″N 7°20′20″E

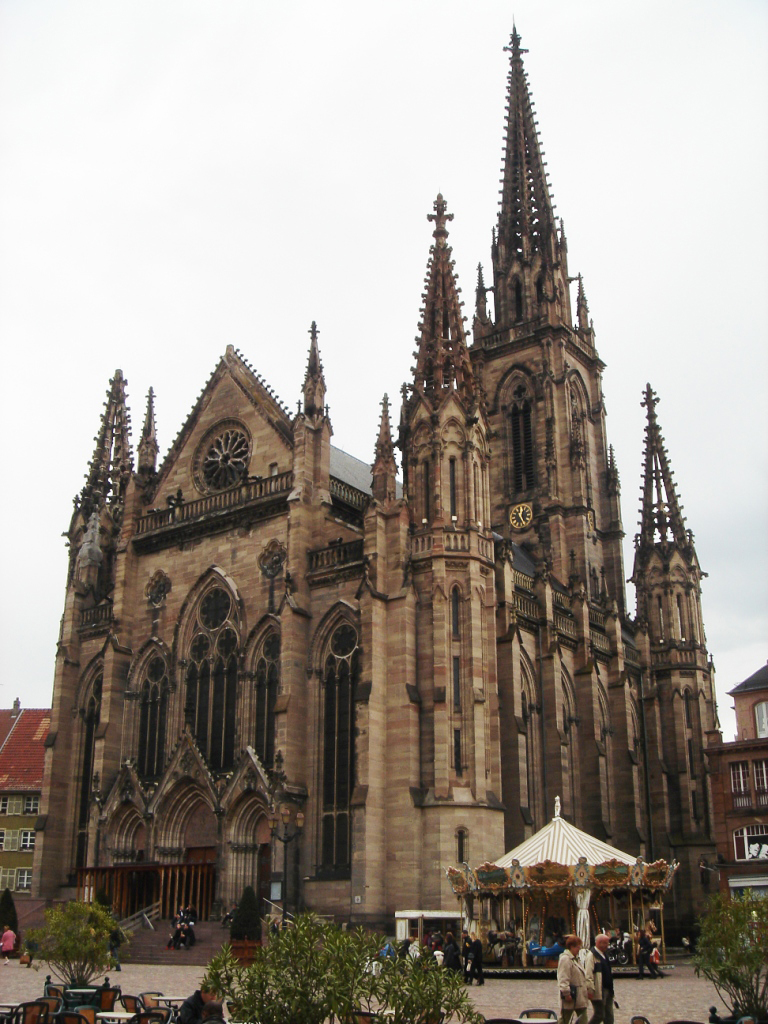
- Temple Saint-Étienne
- Location: Mulhouse
- Country: France
- Denomination: Calvinism

History
- Founded: 1859

Architecture
- Heritage designation: Monument historique
- Designated: 1995
- Architect: Jean-Baptiste Schacre
- Architectural type: church
- Style: Gothic Revival architecture
- Completed: 1866

Specifications
- Height: 97 m (318 ft)

The Temple Saint-Étienne (Protestant St. Stephen's Church; Alsatian: Schtefànskerch) is a Calvinist church located in the city of Mulhouse, Alsace, France. Its congregation forms part of the Protestant Reformed Church of Alsace and Lorraine. Because of its central location on the main square of Mulhouse, the Place de la Réunion, and its 97 metre high bell tower (the highest steeple in the department of Haut-Rhin), it is sometimes referred to as the "Cathedral of Mulhouse" (Cathédrale de Mulhouse). The church was designed by the city architect Jean-Baptiste Schacre, who also designed the large Catholic St. Stephen's Church (Église Saint-Étienne).

== History ==
Until 1858, the former parish church of St. Stephen stood at the location of the current building. The originally late Romanesque building from the 12th century was expanded at the beginning of the 14th century in the Gothic style. A substantially higher choir was added to the nave. In 1510, the Romanesque bell tower was remodelled in the style of the Renaissance. In 1707, the bell tower was crowned with an onion dome. In 1857, the city council of Mulhouse decided to replace the place of worship, which had come to be looked upon as dilapidated, by a new building. The city architect Schacre, who had already constructed the main synagogue of the city and the Catholic St. Stephen's Church, designed a church in the neo-Gothic style with a simple, rectangular ground plan without a transept and choir. In contrast to the long Catholic church, it was a squat, but very wide building. The bell tower, which is visible from quite a distance away, stands behind the building, in contrast to its model on the Freiburg Minster. The current church was built between 1859 and 1866. Since February 2009 and prospectively until late 2019, the church is subjected to a progressive restoration of all its exterior and interior parts. The work had started with the complete scaffolding of the steeple.

== Furnishings ==
A considerable part of the furnishings of the previous building were used in the St. Stephen's church of Jean-Baptiste Schacre. The most important of all the artistic treasures of the city of Mulhouse are the large leaded-glass windows from 1320 to 1350, famous for their vivid design and rich colors. They were originally in the choir and were set into the clerestory windows. The Baroque choir stalls of dark oak are from 1637. The stone church monument of Baron Friedrich Ludwig Waldner von Freundstein (1735), an important work of the local late Baroque period, was erected in the assembly room of the new church. Of the Silbermann organ made by Johann Andreas Silbermann (1765), only the case remains; it was moved into the Reformed St. John's Church (Temple Saint-Jean) of the city, when the old church was torn down. The current organ comes from the workshop of Eberhard Friedrich Walcker, but has been altered many times since it was installed in 1866, especially by the Schwenkedel organ manufacturer. The Baroque pulpit from 1647 is found in the Reformed church of Illzach today.

The main steeple houses the largest set of bells of any Protestant church in France. The five bells were cast in 1867 in Zurich.

=== Gallery ===
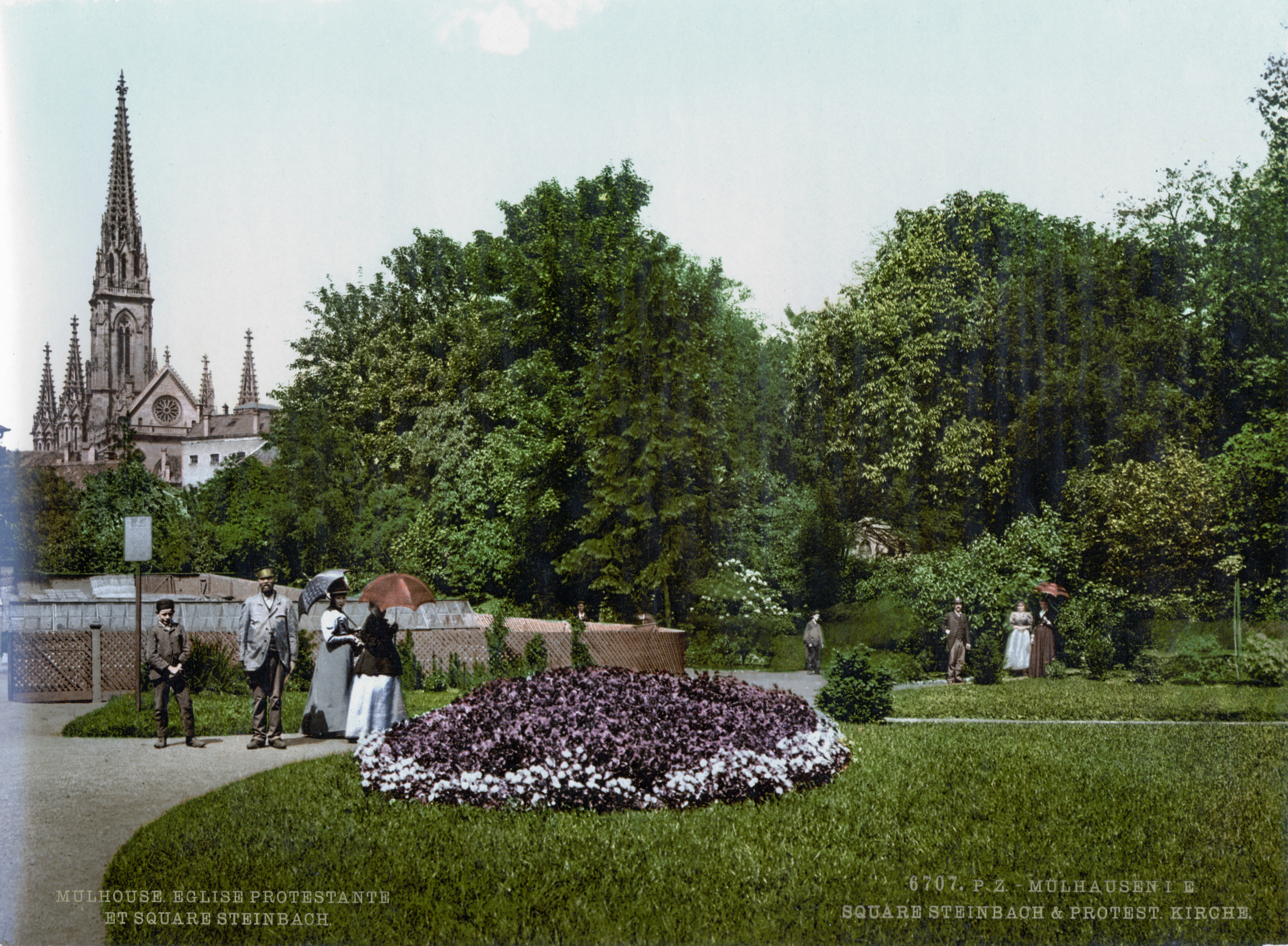
View of St. Stephen's Church around 1900

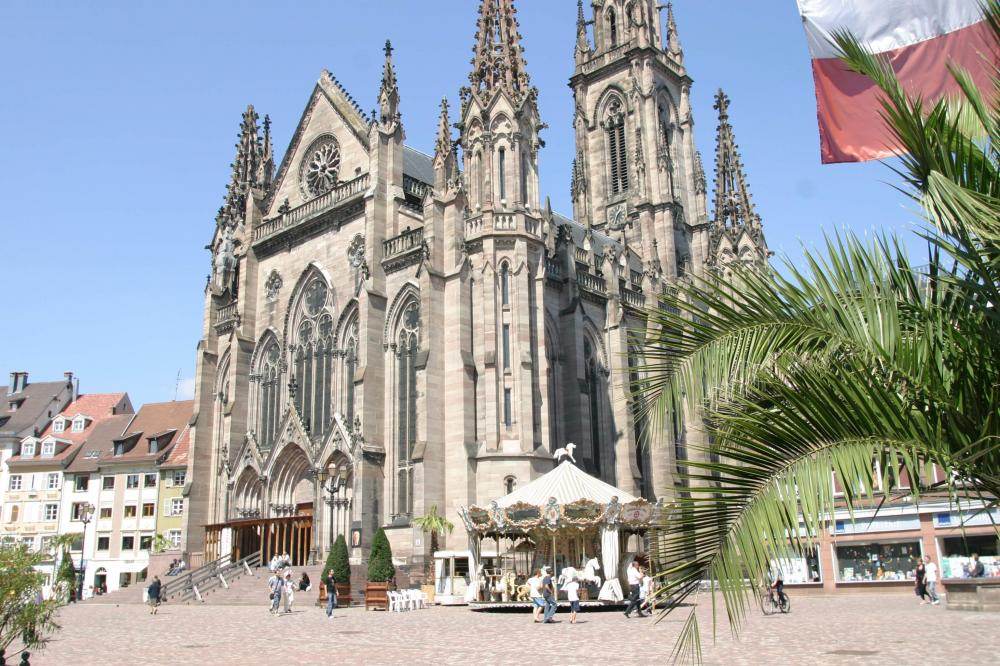
Other view of the façade

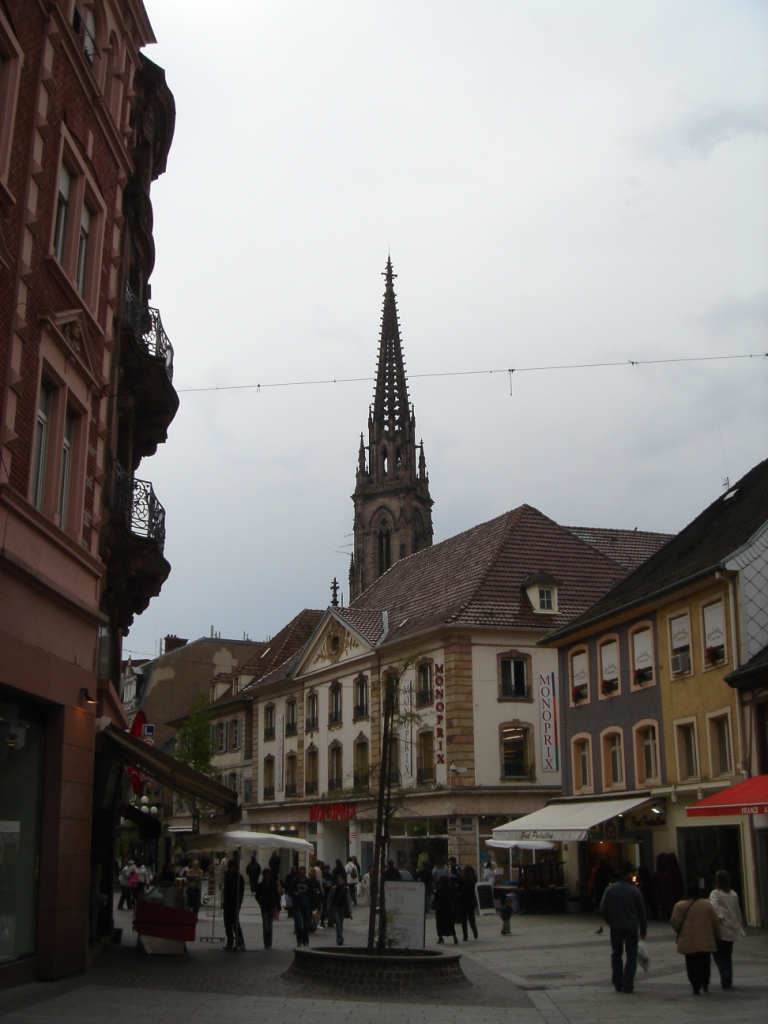
The bell tower dominates the skyline of Mulhouse

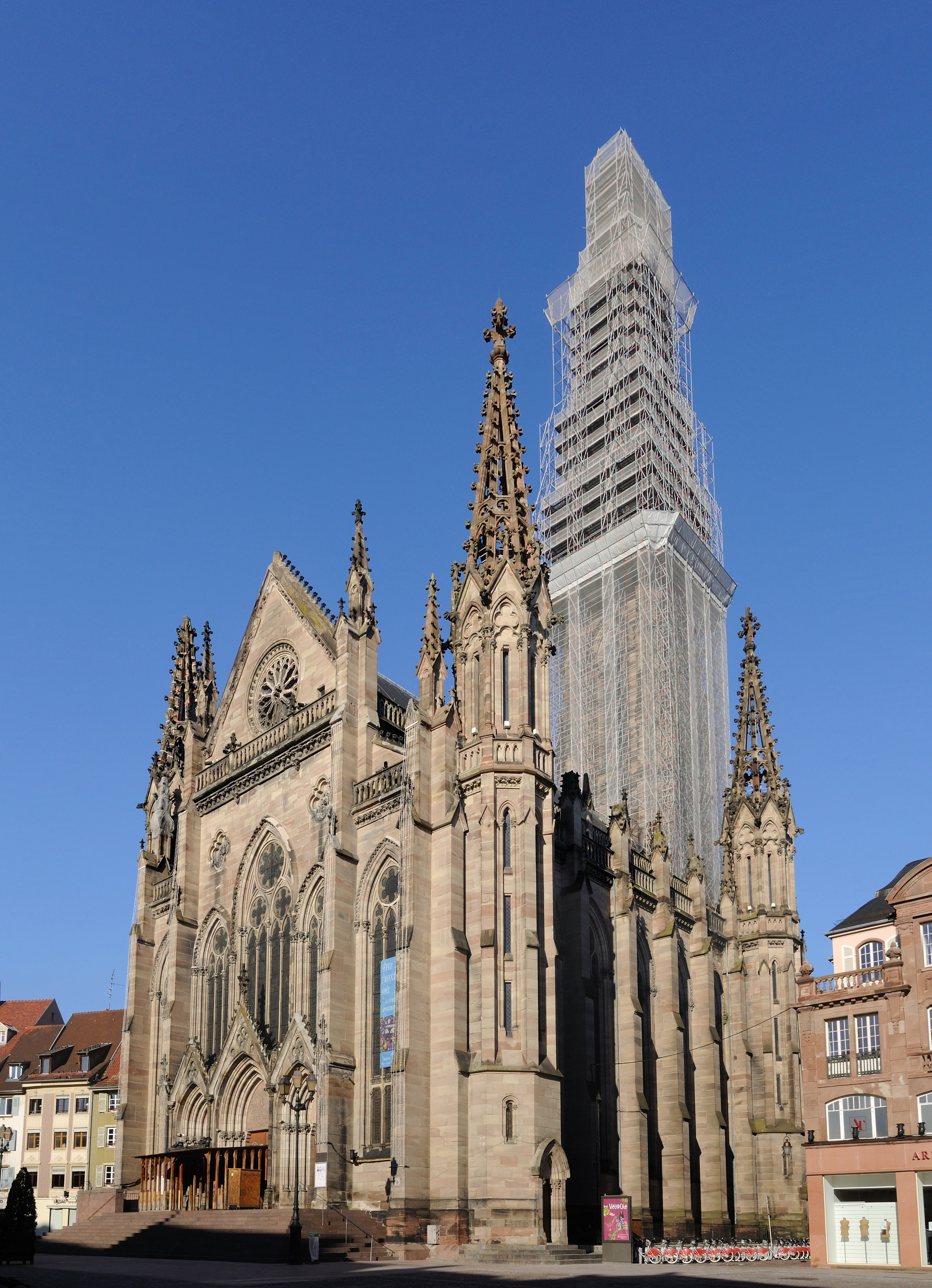
The church under restoration, 2010
