= Alice Desgranges =

French opera singer (1854–1927)

Hortense Marie Eugénie Pellet dite Alice Desgranges (1854 – 1927), was a French operatic singer.

Alice Desgranges was born in Paris. The wife of composer Théodore Ritter, she is present on a painting by Edgar Degas (1878) kept at the Ordrupgaard in Copenhagen, a print by Marcellin Desboutin (1875) and through a poem by Jules Barbey d'Aurevilly, À Madame A. Ritter Desgranges.

== Bibliography ==
- Gazette des Beaux-Arts, part I, 1980, (p. 162) (Long study on the meeting between Degas and Mlle Desgranges).
