= Lutterbach =

Commune in Grand Est, France

- Commune
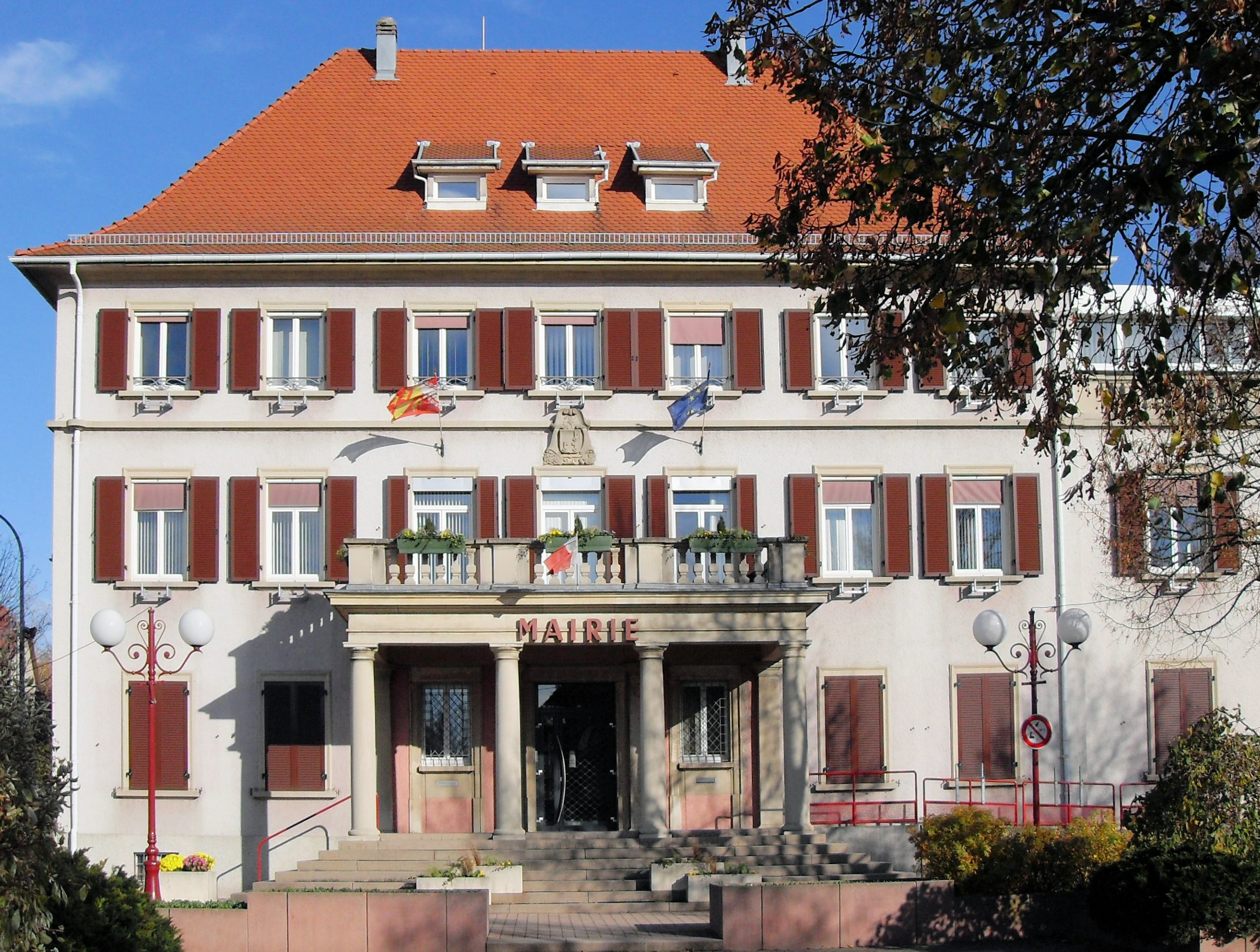
- The town hall in Lutterbach

- Coat of arms
- Location of Lutterbach
- Location within France Location within Grand Est
- Coordinates: 47°45′37″N 7°16′52″E
- Country: France
- Region: Grand Est
- Department: Haut-Rhin
- Arrondissement: Mulhouse
- Canton: Kingersheim
- Intercommunality: Mulhouse Alsace Agglomération

Government
  - Mayor (2020–2026): Rémy Neumann
- Area^{1}: 8.56 km^{2} (3.31 sq mi)
- Highest elevation: 272 m (892 ft)
- Lowest elevation: 244 m (801 ft)
- Population (2023): 6,851
  - Density: 800/km^{2} (2,070/sq mi)
- Time zone: UTC+01:00 (CET)
  - Summer (DST): UTC+02:00 (CEST)
- INSEE/Postal code: 68195 /68460
- ^{1} French Land Register data, which excludes lakes, ponds, glaciers > 1 km^{2} (0.386 sq mi or 247 acres) and river estuaries.

Lutterbach (French pronunciation: [lytəʁbak]) is a commune in the Haut-Rhin department in Alsace in north-eastern France. It forms part of the Mulhouse Alsace Agglomération, the inter-communal local government body for the Mulhouse conurbation.

Lutterbach is served by the Lutterbach station, which is on the Paris–Mulhouse railway and is the junction for the branch line to Thann and Kruth. Line 3 of the Mulhouse tramway links the station to central Mulhouse, and a tram-train service runs over the same tram route before continuing to Thann on the railway.

== Population ==
Historical population
Year	Pop.	±% p.a.
1968	4,036	—
1975	4,742	+2.33%
1982	5,039	+0.87%
1990	5,325	+0.69%
1999	5,581	+0.52%
2007	5,989	+0.89%
2012	6,192	+0.67%
2017	6,310	+0.38%
2023	6,851	+1.38%
Source: INSEE

== See also ==
- Communes of the Haut-Rhin département
