= Daniel Jelensperger =

French musicologist (1799–1831)

- Born: 1 April 1799; Mulhouse, Grand Est, France
- Died: 30 May 1831 (aged 32); Paris, France
- Education: Conservatoire de Paris
- Occupation: Musicologist
- Years active: 1820s–1831

Daniel Jelensperger (1 April 1799 – 30 May 1831) was a French musicologist.

== Life ==
Born in Mulhouse, Jelensperger studied with Anton Reicha at the Conservatoire de Paris where he later taught counterpoint and musical composition. In 1830, he published his harmony treaty L'harmonie au commencement du dix-neuvième siècle et méthode pour l'etudier in Paris, which was published in 1833 by Breitkopf & Härtel in Leipzig under the title Die Harmonie im Anfang des neunzehnten Jahrhunderts. His views were far more influenced by the German musical tradition as represented by Abbé Vogler and Weber than by contemporary French music.

Jelensperger died in Paris.

== Bibliography ==
- Lucien Chevaillier: Musiciens d'Alsace (XIXe siècle). Daniel Jelensperger et Henri Reber. In: Vie en Alsace, Vol. 1 (1923), Heft 2, p. 9–11, ISSN 0042-5516
- David Damschroder: Thinking about Harmony. Historical Perspectives on Analysis. Cambridge University Press, Cambridge 2008 p. 258, ISBN 978-0-521-88814-1.
- Allgemeine musikalische Zeitung, N°. 32, August 1831
