= Departmental Council of Haut-Rhin =

Departmental legislature in France

Departmental Council of Haut-Rhin: Conseil départemental du Haut-Rhin (French); Départementrot vum Owerèlsass (Alsatian); Departementsrat von Oberelsaß (German)
- Logo of the Council

History
- Disbanded: 1 January 2021
- Succeeded by: Assembly of Alsace

Leadership
- President: Rémy With, DVD

Meeting place
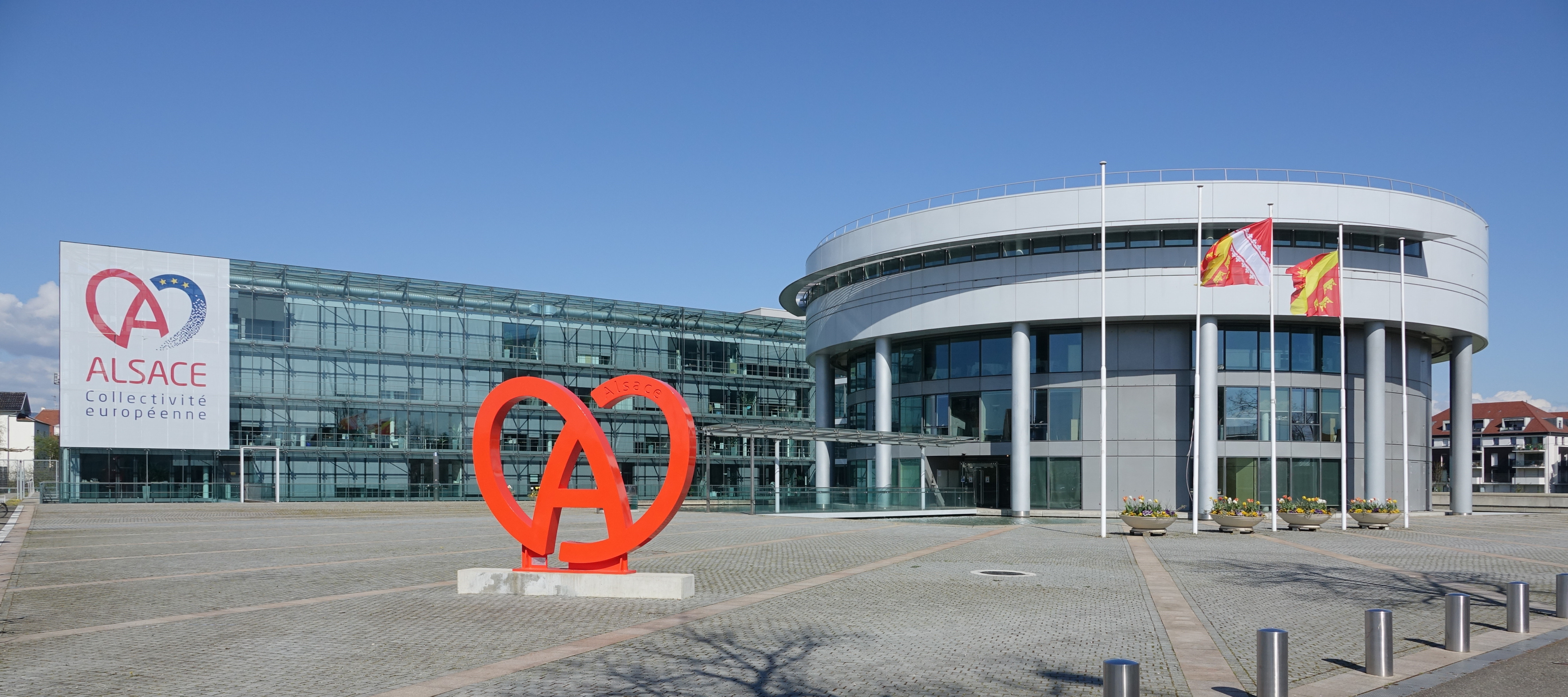
- 100, Avenue d'Alsace, Colmar

The Departmental Council of Haut-Rhin (French: Conseil départemental du Haut-Rhin, Alsatian: Départementrot vum Owerèlsass, German: Departementsrat von Oberelsaß) was the deliberative assembly of the French department of Haut-Rhin. It included 34 departmental councillors from the 17 cantons of Haut-Rhin. Its headquarters were in Colmar.

It was replaced, together with the departmental council of Bas-Rhin, by the assembly of Alsace on January 1, 2021, following the creation of the European Collectivity of Alsace. The members of the departmental council of Haut-Rhin kept their mandate within the new assembly of Alsace.

== List of presidents ==
The last president of the Council was Rémy With (DVD) elected in 2020, following Brigitte Klinkert's appointment as Minister delegate for Integration.

Period		Name	Party	Ref.
1945	1949	Charles Édouard Amiot	MRP	
1949	1958	Georges Bourgeois	RPF	
1958		Joseph Wasmer	MRP	
1958	1973	Georges Bourgeois	UNR then UDR	
1973	1988	Henri Goetschy	UDF	
1988	1998	Jean-Jacques Weber	UDF	
1998	2004	Constant Goerg	DVD	
2004	2015	Charles Buttner	UMP	
2015	2017	Éric Straumann	UMP then LR	
2017		Rémy With (interim)	DVD	
2017	2020	Brigitte Klinkert	DVD	
2020		Rémy With	DVD	

== Vice-presidents ==
The president of the departmental council is assisted by 10 vice-presidents, chosen among the departmental councillors. Each has a delegation of authority.

List of vice-presidents of the Haut-Rhin Departmental Council (as of 2020):
Order	Name	Canton (constituency)
1st	Brigitte Klinkert	Colmar-2
2nd	Pierre Bihl	Sainte-Marie-aux-Mines
3rd	Josiane Mehlen-Vetter	Kingersheim
4th	Michel Habig	Ensisheim
5th	Bernadette Groff	Brunstatt
6th	Alain Grappe	Guebwiller
7th	Lara Million	Mulhouse-3
8th	Max Delmond	Saint-Louis
9th	Karine Pagliarulo	Guebwiller
10th	Nicolas Jander	Altkrich
