= 2024 French legislative election in Haut-Rhin =

Following the first round of the 2024 French legislative election on 30 June 2024, runoff elections in each constituency where no candidate received a vote share greater than 50 percent were scheduled for 7 July. Candidates permitted to stand in the runoff elections needed to either come in first or second place in the first round or achieve more than 12.5 percent of the votes of the entire electorate (as opposed to 12.5 percent of the vote share due to low turnout).

== Haut-Rhin ==
=== 1st constituency ===
Candidate	Party or alliance		First round		Second round	
Candidate	Party or alliance		Votes	%	Votes	%
Laurent Gnaedig	National Rally		16,833	34.24	20,411	41.86
Brigitte Klinkert	Ensemble	Renaissance	14,945	30.40	28,349	58.14
Aïcha Fritsch	New Popular Front	Socialist Party	8,727	17.75		
Yves Hemedinger	The Republicans		6,547	13.32		
Thiébault Zitvogel	Regionalists	Unser Land	1,007	2.05		
Cyrielle Couval	Sovereigntist Right	Debout la France	591	1.20		
Gilles Schaffar	Far-left	Lutte Ouvrière	341	0.69		
Ariane Bischoff-Batma	Reconquête		174	0.35		
Total			49,165	100.00	48,760	100.00
Valid votes			49,165	97.92	48,760	95.74
Invalid votes			323	0.64	533	1.05
Blank votes			721	1.44	1,639	3.22
Total votes			50,209	100.00	50,932	100.00
Registered voters/turnout			78,987	63.57	79,005	64.47

=== 2nd constituency ===
Candidate	Party or alliance		First round		Second round	
Candidate	Party or alliance		Votes	%	Votes	%
Nathalie Aubert	National Rally		22,049	36.17	25,463	42.18
Hubert Ott	Ensemble	Democratic Movement	19,785	32.46	34,907	57.82
Lilian Bourgeois	New Popular Front	La France Insoumise	9,228	15.14		
Daniel Klack	Miscellaneous right	The Republicans	5,012	8.22		
Jean-Marc Burgel	Regionalists	Unser Land	1,645	2.70		
Tiffany Straub	Independent		1,641	2.69		
Claudine Sébert	Sovereigntist right	Independent	679	1.11		
Victor Olry	Reconquête		477	0.78		
Pascal Neuschwanger	Far-left	Lutte Ouvrière	280	0.46		
Nathan Doude Van Troostwijk	Volt		163	0.27		
Total			60,959	100.00	60,370	100.00
Valid votes			60,959	97.63	60,370	95.82
Invalid votes			504	0.81	624	0.99
Blank votes			973	1.56	2,007	3.19
Total votes			62,436	100.00	63,001	100.00
Registered voters/turnout			92,476	67.52	92,497	68.11

=== 3rd constituency ===
Candidate	Party or alliance		First round		Second round	
Candidate	Party or alliance		Votes	%	Votes	%
Christian Zimmermann	National Rally		21,790	38.86	26,883	48.08
Didier Lemaire	Ensemble	Horizons	13,980	24.93	29,028	51.92
Thomas Zeller	Miscellaneous right	The Republicans	7,521	13.41		
Bénédicte Viroulet	New Popular Front	La France Insoumise	7,119	12.70		
Jean-Denis Zoelle	Regionalists	Unser Land	1,850	3.30		
Antoine Waechter	Ecologists	Independent	1,563	2.79		
Gaelle Cressin	Ecologists	Independent	785	1.40		
Sandrine Noël	Reconquête		653	1.16		
Simone Fischer	Sovereigntist right	Debout la France	579	1.03		
Géraud Ferry	Far-left	Lutte Ouvrière	234	0.42		
Total			56,074	100.00	55,911	100.00
Valid votes			56,074	97.79	55,911	95.90
Invalid votes			344	0.60	507	0.87
Blank votes			921	1.61	1,884	3.23
Total votes			57,339	100.00	58,302	100.00
Registered voters/turnout			87,359	65.64	87,370	66.73

=== 4th constituency ===
Candidate	Party or alliance		First round		Second round	
Candidate	Party or alliance		Votes	%	Votes	%
Marion Wilhelm	National Rally		30,294	44.92	33,393	49.32
Raphaël Schellenberger	The Republicans		21,166	31.39	34,309	50.68
Simone Fest	New Popular Front	La France Insoumise	10,352	15.35		
Maxence Helfrich	Regionalists	Unser Land	2,416	3.58		
Corinne Morgen	Ecologists	Independent	1,754	2.60		
Raymonde Diop	Reconquête		871	1.29		
Aimé Sense	Far-left	Lutte Ouvrière	582	0.86		
Total			67,435	100.00	67,702	100.00
Valid votes			67,435	97.72	67,702	96.38
Invalid votes			364	0.53	550	0.78
Blank votes			1,211	1.75	1,993	2.84
Total votes			69,010	100.00	70,245	100.00
Registered voters/turnout			104,237	66.20	104,252	67.38

=== 5th constituency ===
Candidate	Party or alliance		First round		Second round	
Candidate	Party or alliance		Votes	%	Votes	%
Olivier Becht	Ensemble	Renaissance	17,749	37.23	31,766	67.00
Pierre Pinto	National Rally		14,096	29.56	15,649	33.00
Nadia El Hajjaji	New Popular Front	Génération.s	12,776	26.80		
Jean-Frédéric Baechler	Regionalists	Unser Land	1,104	2.32		
Rachid Lounes	Ecologists	Independent	567	1.19		
Emmanuel Taffarelli	Reconquête		544	1.14		
David Dolui	Volt		308	0.65		
Salah Keltoumi	Far-left	Lutte Ouvrière	287	0.60		
Romain Spinali	Regionalists	Unser Land	249	0.52		
Total			47,680	100.00	47,415	100.00
Valid votes			47,680	97.48	47,415	96.25
Invalid votes			143	0.29	173	0.35
Blank votes			1,090	2.23	1,676	3.40
Total votes			48,913	100.00	49,264	100.00
Registered voters/turnout			76,089	64.28	76,120	64.72

=== 6th constituency ===
Candidate	Party or alliance		First round		Second round	
Candidate	Party or alliance		Votes	%	Votes	%
Christelle Ritz	National Rally		23,246	39.74	26,444	44.75
Bruno Fuchs	Ensemble	Democratic Movement	17,660	30.19	32,651	55.25
Florence Claudepierre	New Popular Front	La France Insoumise	12,913	22.08		
Laurent Roth	Regionalists	Unser Land	1,898	3.24		
Pascal Blum	Ecologists	Independent	808	1.38		
Denis Pint	Reconquête		711	1.22		
Romuald Lourenço	Sovereigntist right	Debout la France	666	1.14		
Nathalie Mulot	Far-left	Lutte Ouvrière	503	0.86		
Pablo Roldan-Sanchez	Miscellaneous right	Independent	85	0.15		
Total			58,490	100.00	59,095	100.00
Valid votes			58,490	97.54	59,095	96.29
Invalid votes			337	0.56	426	0.69
Blank votes			1,139	1.90	1,849	3.01
Total votes			59,966	100.00	61,370	100.00
Registered voters/turnout			93,861	63.89	93,929	65.34
