= Assembly of Alsace =

Regional legislature of Alsace, France

Assembly of Alsace Assemblée d'Alsace (French) Versammlung vum Elsàss (Alsatian)

History
- Founded: 1 January 2021
- Preceded by: Departmental Council of Bas-Rhin; Departmental Council of Haut-Rhin

Leadership
- President: Frédéric Bierry, LR

Meeting place
- Place du Quartier Blanc, Strasbourg

The Assembly of Alsace (French: Assemblée d'Alsace, Alsatian: Versammlung vum Elsàss - whose formal name is Conseil départemental d'Alsace) is the deliberative assembly which has administered the European Collectivity of Alsace (CEA) since 1 January 2021.

The law of 2 August 2019 relating to the competences of the CEA specifies that until the next renewal of the departmental councils, the assembly of Alsace would be composed of all the departmental councilors of Bas-Rhin and Haut-Rhin.

Ordinance No. 2020-1304 indicates that the address of the community is located temporarily on Place du Quartier Blanc in Strasbourg. Its first plenary session was held on 2 January 2021 in Colmar, where the 80 elected officials sat until the departmental elections of June 2021.

The plenary session of 27 September 2021 confirmed Strasbourg as the seat of the community and Colmar for the holding of the assemblies (with the exception of the vote on the budget).

== Executive ==
=== President ===
Frédéric Bierry (LR) has been the president of the assembly since January 2021.

=== Vice-Presidents ===
List of vice-presidents of the Assembly of Alsace (as of June 2021)
| Order | Name | Canton (constituency) | Commission (delegacy) |
|---|---|---|---|
| 1st | Pierre Bihl | Sainte-Marie-aux-Mines | Centre Alsace territory and territorial equity |
| 2nd | Isabelle Dollinger | Haguenau | Alsatian public service and transformation of public action commission in connection with the inhabitants |
| 3rd | Nicolas Jander | Altkirch | South Alsace – Saint-Louis – Sundgau – Thur – Doller territorial commission |
| 4th | Catherine Graef-Eckert | Lingolsheim | Economy, tourism, agricultural, employment, energy and climate transition dynamics commission |
| 5th | Eric Straumann | Colmar-2 | Colmar regional territorial commission |
| 6th | Lara Million | Mulhouse-3 | Efficiency and financial sobriety commission |
| 7th | Jean-Philippe Maurer | Strasbourg-6 | Networks and mobility commission |
| 8th | Fatima Jenn | Mulhouse-2 | Solidarity, habitat and the fight against poverty commission |
| 9th | Jean-Louis Hoerlé | Schiltigheim | Strasbourg Eurometropolis territorial commission |
| 10th | Pascale Schmidiger | Saint-Louis | Alsatian heritage and outreach commission |
| 11th | Marc Munck | Rixheim | Territorial commission of the agglomeration of Mulhouse |
| 12th | Michèle Eschlimann | Saverne | West Alsace – Saverne – Molsheim territorial commission |
| 13th | Nicolas Matt | Strasbourg-5 | Youth, sport, education and bilingualism commission |
| 14th | Karine Pagliarulo | Guebwiller | Health and support for elderly and disabled persons commission |
| 15th | André Erbs | Haguenau | North Alsace – Haguenau – Wissembourg territorial commission |

== Composition ==
Composition by party (since June 2021)
| Party | Acronym | Seats |
Majority (72 seats)
| The Republicans | LR | 42 |
| Miscellaneous right | DVD | 21 |
| Union of Democrats and Independents | UDI | 3 |
| Miscellaneous centre | DVC | 2 |
| La République En Marche! | LREM | 2 |
| Agir | Agir | 1 |
| Democratic Movement | MoDem | 1 |
Opposition (8 seats)
| Ecology | DVE | 3 |
| Europe Ecology – The Greens | EELV | 2 |
| Socialist Party | PS | 2 |
| French Communist Party | PCF | 1 |
