= List of senators of Haut-Rhin =

Location of Haut-Rhin in France

Following is a list of senators of Haut-Rhin, people who have represented the department of Haut-Rhin in the Senate of France. The department was annexed to Germany in 1871 after the Franco-Prussian War, returned to France in 1919 by the Treaty of Versailles.

== Third Republic ==
Senators for Haut-Rhin under the French Third Republic were:

- Robert Bourgeois (1920–1935)
- Paul Helmer (1920–1929) died in office
- Jules Scheurer (1920–1927)
- Sébastien Gegauff (1920–1935) died in office
- Paul Jourdain (1927–1940)
- Joseph Pfleger (1929–1935)
- Médard Brogly (1935–1940)
- Joseph Brom (1935–1940)
- Paul Ostermann (1935–1940)

== Fourth Republic ==
Senators for Haut-Rhin under the French Fourth Republic were:

In office	Name	Group	Notes
1946–1948	Joseph Pfleger	Mouvement Républicain Populaire	
1946–1948	Édouard Richard	Socialiste	
1946–1948	Charles Édouard Amiot	Mouvement Républicain Populaire	
1948–1951	Georges Bourgeois	Rassemblement du Peuple Français	Until 17 June 1951 (elected deputy)
1948–1959	Paul-Jacques Kalb	Républicains Sociaux	
1948–1959	Eugène Ritzenthaler	Républicains Sociaux	
1948–1959	Modeste Zussy	Rassemblement du Peuple Français	
1951–1952	Lucien Gander	Rassemblement du Peuple Français	Elected 30 September 1951 (by-election)
1952–1956	Gérard Hartmann	Républicains Indépendants	Died in office 18 November 1956
1957–1958	Eugène Garessus	Centre Républicain d'Action Rurale et Sociale	Elected 13 January 1957

== Fifth Republic ==
Senators for Haut-Rhin under the French Fifth Republic:

Term	Name	Group or party	Notes
1959–1968	Paul-Jacques Kalb	Union pour la Nouvelle République	Died 7 August 1964
1959–1968	Eugène Ritzenthaler	Union pour la Nouvelle République	
1959–1968	Modeste Zussy	'Union pour la Nouvelle République	
1959–1968	Charles Stoessel	Républicains Populaires et du Centre Démocratique	Elected 26 September 1965 (by-election); Died 14 October 1966
1959–1968	Charles Zwickert	Union Centriste	Replaced Charles Stoessel 15 October 1966
1968–1977	Marcel Nuninger	Union Centriste des Démocrates de Progrès	
1968–1977	Pierre Schielé	Union Centriste	
1968–1977	Charles Zwickert	Union Centriste	
1977–1986	Henri Goetschy	Union Centriste	
1977–1986	Pierre Schielé	Union Centriste	
1977–1986	Charles Zwickert	Union Centriste	
1986–1995	Hubert Haenel	Union pour un Mouvement Populaire	
1986–1995	Henri Goetschy	Union Centriste	
1986–1995	Pierre Schielé	Union Centriste	
1995–2004	Hubert Haenel	Union pour un Mouvement Populaire	
1995–2004	Daniel Eckenspieller	Groupe Union pour un Mouvement Populaire	
1995–2004	Jean-Louis Lorrain	Union pour un Mouvement Populaire	
2004–2014	Hubert Haenel	Union pour un Mouvement Populaire	Until 6 March 2010 (named to the Constitutional Council)
2004–2014	Jean-Louis Lorrain	Union pour un Mouvement Populaire	From 7 March 2010 in place of Hubert Haenel; Died in office 27 June 2013
2004–2014	Françoise Boog	Groupe Union pour un Mouvement Populaire	From 28 June 2013 in place of Jean-Louis Lorrain
2004–2014	Catherine Troendlé	Les Républicains	
2004–2014	Patricia Schillinger	La République En Marche	
2004–2014	Jean-Marie Bockel	Union Centriste	Until 19 July 2007 (named to cabinet)
2004–2014	Jacques Muller	Socialiste	Replaced Jean-Marie Bockel 20 July 2007; Left office 13 December 2010
2004–2014	Jean-Marie Bockel	Union Centriste	Returned to senate 14 December 2010
2014–present	Jean-Marie Bockel	Union Centriste	
2014–present	René Danesi	Les Républicains	
2014–present	Patricia Schillinger	La République En Marche	
2014–present	Catherine Troendlé	Les Républicains	

== Sources ==
- Liste des anciens sénateurs de la IIIème République par circonscription (in French), Sénat de France
- Liste des anciens sénateurs de la IVème République par circonscription (in French), Sénat de France
- Liste des anciens sénateurs de la Vème République par circonscription (in French), Sénat de France
- Liste par département – Haut-Rhin (in French), Sénat de France
