= Jean-Luc Reitzer =

French politician (born 1951)

Member of the National Assembly for Haut-Rhin's 3rd constituency
- In office 23 June 1988 – 21 June 2022
- Preceded by: Proportional representation
- Succeeded by: Didier Lemaire

Mayor of Altkirch
- In office 13 March 1983 – 23 September 2017
- Preceded by: Raymond Muller
- Succeeded by: Nicolas Jander

General councillor of Haut-Rhin for Canton of Altkirch
- In office 25 March 1979 – 15 July 2002
- Preceded by: Raymond Muller
- Succeeded by: Alphonse Hartmann

Personal details
- Born: 29 December 1951 (age 74) Altkirch, Haut-Rhin, France
- Party: The Republicans
- Education: Sciences Po Strasbourg
- Occupation: Public relations executive

Jean-Luc Reitzer (born 29 December 1951) is a French politician who served as the Member of the National Assembly for Haut-Rhin's 3rd constituency from 1988 to 2022.

== Biography ==
Jean-Luc Reitzer studied at the Institut d'études politiques de Strasbourg (Institute of Political Studies of Strasbourg), where he graduated at the top of his class. He then entered the private sector and rose to become an executive of public relations at PSA Peugeot Citroën.

While still at PSA Peugeot Citroën, he entered politics and became the deputy mayor of Altkirch in the Sundgau region in 1977. Reitzer then served as a general councillor of Haut-Rhin for the Canton of Altkirch from 1979 to 2002 and also became the mayor of the capital of Sundgau in 1983, in which position he served until 2017, when he resigned due to the law on the accumulation of mandates. Briefly serving on the Regional Council of Alsace from 1986 to 1988, he was elected Member of the National Assembly for Haut-Rhin's 3rd constituency in the 1988 French legislative elections. Defining himself as a "Gaullist of progress," he joined the Rally for the Republic (RPR) and its successors, the Union for a Popular Movement (UMP) and The Republicans (LR).

In the National Assembly, Reitzer serves on the Committee on Foreign Affairs. He is also a member of the Study Group on the Tibet Question, the France-Bahrain Parliamentary Friendship Group, the France-Djibouti Parliamentary Friendship Group, the France-Turkey Parliamentary Friendship Group and the French delegation to the NATO Parliamentary Assembly.

Reitzer supported Alain Juppé in the LR presidential primary of 2016. He was re-elected to the National Assembly in the 2017 French legislative elections with 55% of the vote, despite the general difficulties LR candidates faced in overcoming the "Macron wave" that year.

In May 2018, Reitzer expressed concerns with the treatment of Members of the National Assembly in France, particularly with regards to the numerous regulations they must follow and widespread suspicion of their work. He proposed exploring the possibility of raising deputies' salaries, arguing that this would "combat temptations like corruption." Reitzer also claimed that "We now spend our time collecting fees and restaurant bills." His statements provoked a media frenzy and were widely debated on social media.

On 5 March 2020, Reitzer was hospitalized in Mulhouse in a "worrying state" after testing positive for COVID-19. After two and a half months, including one month in a coma, Reitzer was released from the hospital in May. He returned to the National Assembly in October, denouncing the "dysfunctions" of the French government's response to the COVID-19 pandemic.

On 6 May 2022, Reitzer announced to the regional press that he would not be running for an eighth term in the National Assembly in the 2022 legislative elections.

== Electoral offices ==
- 1979–2022: General councillor of Haut-Rhin (vice-president from 1998 to 2001)
- 1977–1983: Deputy mayor of Altkirch, Haut-Rhin
- 1983–2017: Mayor of Altkirch
- 1986–1988: Regional councillor of Alsace
- 1988–2022: Member of the National Assembly for Haut-Rhin's 3rd constituency
