= Departmental Council of Bas-Rhin =

Departmental legislature in France

Departmental Council of Bas-Rhin Conseil départemental du Bas-Rhin
- Logo of Bas-Rhin

History
- Disbanded: 1 January 2021
- Succeeded by: Assembly of Alsace

Leadership
- President: Frédéric Bierry, LR since 29 March 2015

Meeting place
- Place du Quartier Blanc, Strasbourg

The Departmental Council of Bas-Rhin (Alsatian: Départementrõt vum Underelsàss, French: Conseil départemental du Bas-Rhin) was the deliberative assembly of the French department of Bas-Rhin. Its headquarters were in Place du Quartier Blanc in Strasbourg.

It was replaced, together with the departmental council of Haut-Rhin, by the Assembly of Alsace on January 1, 2021, following the creation of the European Collectivity of Alsace. Its last meeting was held on November 30, 2020. The members of the Bas-Rhin departmental council retained their mandate within the new Alsace assembly.

The last president of the departmental council was Frédéric Bierry.

== Vice presidents ==
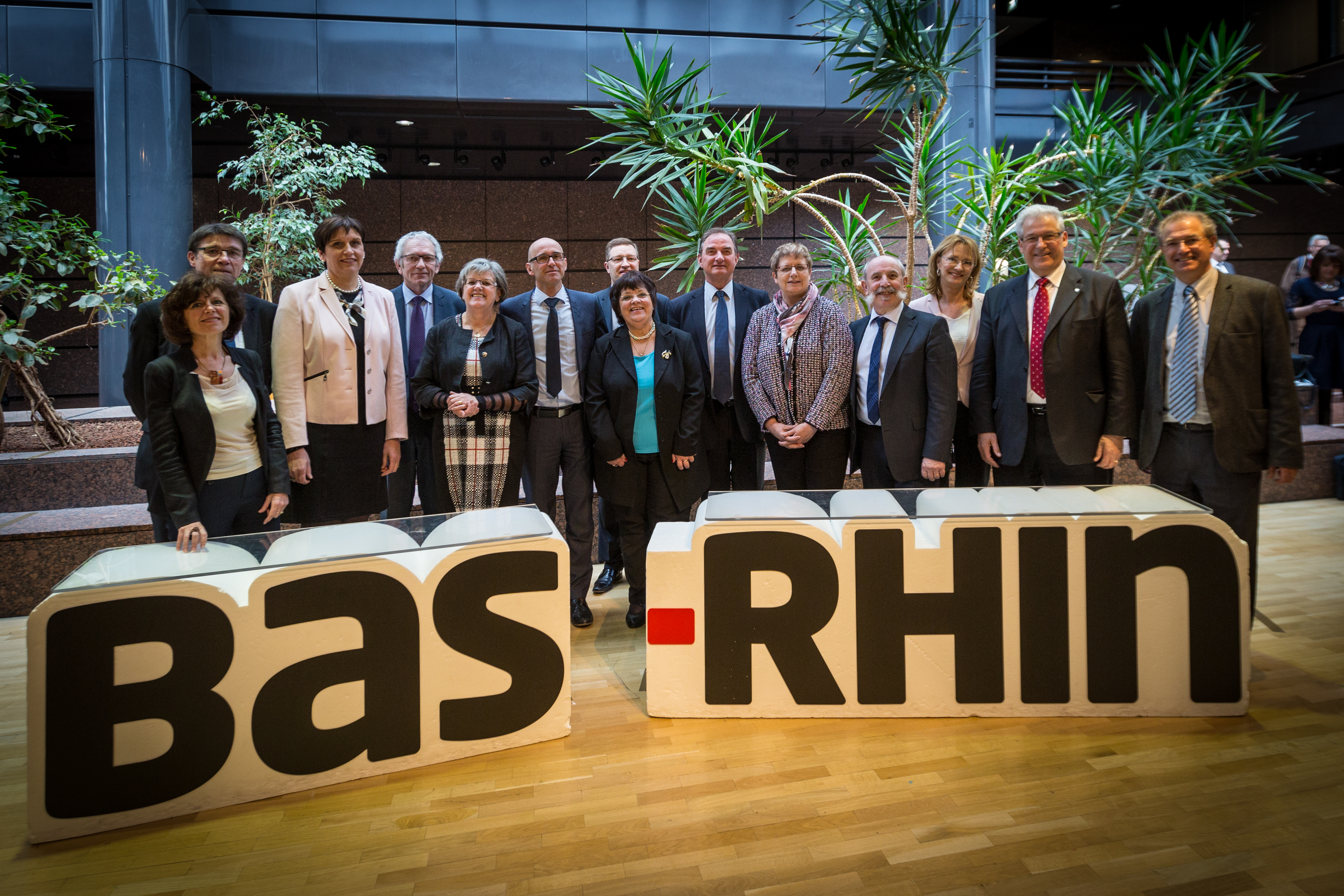
Executives (president and vice-presidents) of the Bas-Rhin departmental council after the 2015 departmental elections.

List of vice-presidents of the Departmental Council of Bas-Rhin (as of 2020)
Order	Name	Canton (constituency)
1st	Bernard Fischer	Obernai
2nd	Laurence Muller-Bronn	Erstein
3rd	Rémi Bertrand	Reichshoffen
4th	Marie-Paule Lehmann	Bouxwiller
5th	Jean-Philippe Maurer	Strasbourg-6
6th	Michèle Eschlimann	Saverne
7th	Philippe Meyer	Molsheim
8th	Pascale Jurdant-Pfeiffer	Strasbourg-6
9th	Etienne Burger	Bouxwiller
10th	Danielle Diligent	Schiltigheim
11th	Marcel Bauer	Sélestat
12th	Isabelle Dollinger	Haguenau
13th	Etienne Wolf	Brumath

== Composition ==
The Council consists of 46 members (departmental councilors) elected from the 23 cantons of Bas-Rhin.

Composition by party (2015-2020)
Party	Acronym	Elected
Majority (38 seats)
The Republicans	LR	24
Union of the Right	UD	10
Union of Democrats and Independents	UDI	2
Miscellaneous right	DVD	2
Opposition (8 seats)
Socialist Party	PS	8
