= Cantons of the Haut-Rhin department =

List of cantons in Haut-Rhin, France

The following is a list of the 17 cantons of the Haut-Rhin department, in France, following the French canton reorganisation which came into effect in March 2015:

- Altkirch
- Brunstatt-Didenheim
- Cernay
- Colmar-1
- Colmar-2
- Ensisheim
- Guebwiller
- Kingersheim
- Masevaux-Niederbruck
- Mulhouse-1
- Mulhouse-2
- Mulhouse-3
- Rixheim
- Saint-Louis
- Sainte-Marie-aux-Mines
- Wintzenheim
- Wittenheim
