= Frédéric Bierry =

French politician (born 1966)

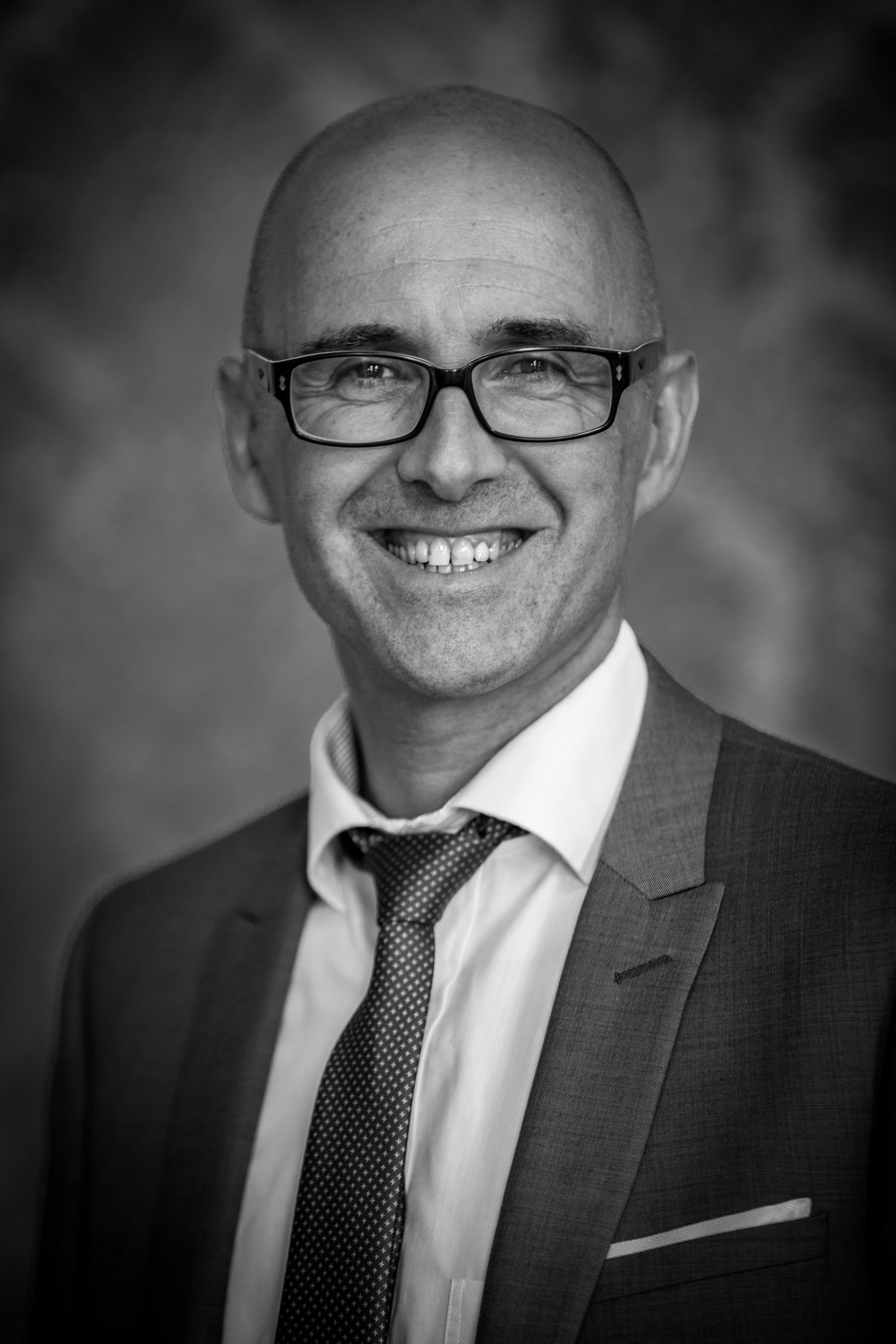
- Frédéric Bierry in 2015

President of the Assembly of Alsace
- Incumbent
- Assumed office 2 January 2021

President of the Departmental Council of Bas-Rhin
- In office 31 December 2020 – 2 April 2015
- Preceded by: Guy-Dominique Kennel

Departmental Councilor of Bas-Rhin
- In office 1 April 2004 – 1 April 2015
- Constituency: Canton of Schirmeck

Mayor of Schirmeck
- In office June 1995 – April 2015
- Preceded by: Michael Sturm
- Succeeded by: Laurent Bertrand

Personal details
- Born: 21 April 1966 (age 60) Strasbourg, Bas-Rhin, France
- Party: UMP - PRV (2004-2015); LR (since 2015)

Frédéric Bierry (born 21 April 1966) is a French politician who was a member of the UMP, then of the Republicans.

He was the mayor of Schirmeck from 1995 to 2015, president of the departmental council of Bas-Rhin from 2015 to 2020 and president of the assembly of Alsace since January 2, 2021.

== Political background ==
Born in April 1966 in Strasbourg, from a Welche family from the Bruche valley, Frédéric Bierry was fifteen years old when he decided that he would go into politics, while his parents were workers in a textile company in Coframaille.

He graduated with a master's degree in private law and became a professor of economics and social sciences. He entered politics in 1993 as a parliamentary attaché to UMP deputy Alain Ferry and then to Laurent Furst.

Former president of the Radical Party 67, he was the mayor of Schirmeck from 1995 to 2015, elected to the general council of Bas-Rhin in 2004 and re-elected in 2011 in the canton of Schirmeck.

He was elected departmental councilor for Bas-Rhin in the canton of Mutzig on March 29, 2015, in tandem with Frédérique Mozziconacci (DVD), with 63.26% of the votes.

On April 2, he was elected to the presidency of the departmental council of Bas-Rhin where he was the only candidate of the right-wing majority. He succeeded Guy-Dominique Kennel (UMP), who held the presidency from March 2008 to April 2015.

He supported Bruno Le Maire for the 2016 Republican presidential primary.

== Mobilization for Alsace ==
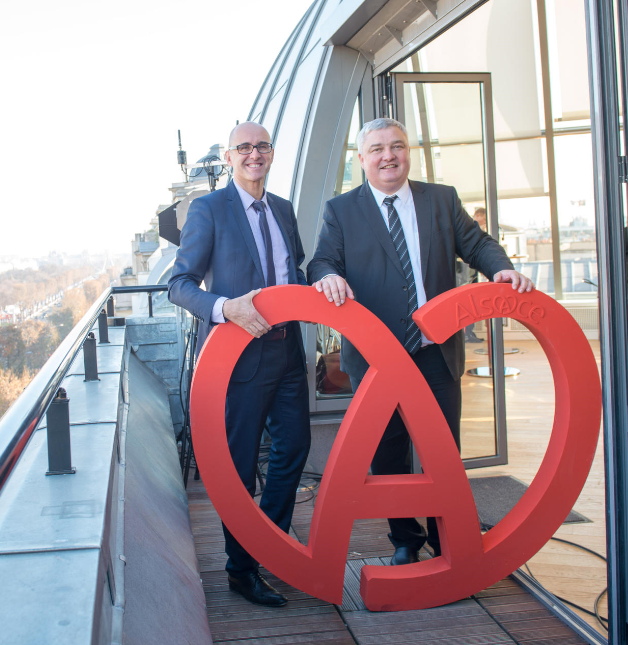
Frédéric Bierry and Éric Straumann at the inauguration of the Maison de l'Alsace

On February 3, 2017, the departmental councils of Bas-Rhin and Haut-Rhin meeting in Colmar unanimously adopted a motion solemnly affirming the need for Alsace to regain an institutional and political identity, and announcing the creation of a territorial assembly of Alsace. His fight for the return of an Alsatian institution continued with Brigitte Klinkert elected to the presidency of Haut-Rhin following the resignation of Eric Straumann for non-accumulation of mandates on September 1, 2017.

Following the statement by Prime Minister Jean Castex in Colmar on January 23, 2021, stating that he was "never convinced by these immense regions, some of which do not respond to any historical legitimacy, and above all do not seem to me to respond to the growing needs of our fellow citizens for local public action”, he called for the dismemberment of the Grand Est region and the transfer of its powers to the new community.

On August 3, 2025, Frédéric Bierry called for Alsace to be separated from the Northeast region and for Alsace to become a single community, comprising departments and a region.

== Social report and solidarity policies ==
On October 5, 2016, Frédéric Bierry presented a report to the Assembly of the departments of France on the future of the social policies of the departments.

Noting that the French social model is "obsolete and unsuitable", he recommended a social model of alternation based on 5 fundamental pillars: efficiency, responsibility, dignity, the ability to involve and credibility.

The report considered that the complexity of the current social model undermines its effectiveness. It proposed simplification measures, in particular the merger of the 10 social minima into 2 benefits, the simplification of administrative procedures and the establishment of a single point of contact for each user.
