= Château d'Altkirch =

Now destroyed castle in Altkirch in the Haut-Rhin département of France

Coordinates: 47°37′29″N 7°14′21″E

The Château d'Altkirch was a castle, now destroyed, in the commune of Altkirch in the Haut-Rhin département of France.

== History ==
The castle was built by the counts of Ferrette who lived at Altkirch in the 11th century The castle could have been built in the 12th century or at the start of the 13th: its first documented mention is from 1231. The discovery of 15th century documents from Milan has prompted several authors to say that the keep only dates from the 15th century.

Situated on the edge of a spur overlooking the valley of the River Ill, the castle lost its strategic importance in the 16th century and slowly declined. After 1659, the owners (Mazarin and his heirs) showed little interest in the structure and some external buildings were put aside (prison, keeper's house).

The keep was still standing in 1844 along with some sections of wall. The whole site was cleared in 1855-45 during the construction of a new church, whose bell tower stands on the site of the keep. The remains of the castle were used to level the site. One part still exists - to the north, heavily modified during the 19th and 20th centuries, and called the "maison de guet" (watch house). A chapel was part of the castle, dedicated to St Catherine and containing a 14th-century indulgence. A facsimile is in the town archives.

== Description ==
The castle site was a vast almost circular enceinte, separated from the town by a ditch, with a circular central keep and other buildings. The castle's appearance is known from several sources, notably in an engraving by Weiss that appeared in the Alsatia Illustrata de Schoepflin, a painting by Gutzwiller from about 1844, and a sketch by Winkler dated 1883. A copy of a plan from 1766 gives a precise configuration of the site.

== See also ==
- List of castles in France
