= Henri Goetschy =

French politician (1926–2021)

French Senator
- In office 25 September 1977 – 1 October 1995
- Constituency: Haut-Rhin

President of the Departmental Council of Haut-Rhin
- In office 1973–1988
- Preceded by: Georges Bourgeois
- Succeeded by: Jean-Jacques Weber

Personal details
- Born: 4 September 1926 Mulhouse, France
- Died: 17 April 2021 (aged 94)
- Party: MRP; CD

Henri Goetschy (4 September 1926 – 16 April 2021) was a French politician and veterinarian. A member of the Democratic Centre, he served in the Senate from 1977 to 1995. He was also President of the Departmental Council of Haut-Rhin from 1973 to 1988.

== Biography ==
Born in Mulhouse in 1926, Goetschy worked as a veterinarian before entering politics. He was first a member of the Popular Republican Movement but joined the Democratic Centre when the two parties merged in 1967. In 1964, he was elected General Councilor of the Canton of Soultz-Haut-Rhin. In the 1967 French legislative election, he was defeated for a seat on the National Assembly by Georges Bourgeois, who was also President of the Departmental Council of Haut-Rhin.

In the 1970s, Goetschy became a centrist leader in Haut-Rhin. After the decline of Gaullism and his defeat of Georges Bourgeois to become President of the Departmental Council of Haut-Rhin, he gained political prominence. He left this position in 1988 and endorsed Jean-Jacques Weber to be his successor. In 1977, he was elected to represent Haut-Rhin in the Senate, and was re-elected in 1986. He did not stand for re-election in 1995. From 1992 to 1998, he was also a member of the Regional Council of Alsace.

Goetschy's political career centered around his defense and proactive promotion of the Alsatian dialect and bilingualism. Using new abilities made available by Decentralization, he promoted the development of bilingual schools and defense of Alsace. He was one of the most prolific regional figures in the region in the 1970s and 1980s, along with Daniel Hoeffel and Marcel Rudloff. He also continued to promote centrism and was closely affiliated with François Bayrou. He joined the Democratic Movement when it was founded. In his later life, he lived in Kruth.

Henri Goetschy died on 16 April 2021 at the age of 94.
