= Politics of Alsace =

The politics of Alsace, France, takes place in a framework of a presidential representative democracy, whereby the President of the Regional Council is the head of government, and of a pluriform multi-party system. Legislative power is vested in the regional council.

== Executive ==
The executive of the region is led by the President of the Regional Council.

== Legislative branch ==
The Regional Council of Alsace (Conseil régional d'Alsace) is composed of 37 councillors, elected by proportional representation in a two-round system. The winning list in the second round is automatically entitled to a quarter of the seats. The remainder of the seats are allocated through proportional representation with a 5% threshold.

The council is elected for a six-year term.

=== Current composition ===
| Party | | seats |
|---|---|---|
| • | Union for a Popular Movement | 18 |
| | Socialist Party | 8 |
| | National Front | 8 |
| • | Union for French Democracy | 7 |
| | The Greens | 4 |
| • | Miscellaneous Right | 2 |

== Elections ==
=== Other elections ===
Presidential runoff elections results
| Year | Regional winner | Runner-up |
|---|---|---|
| 2007 | 65.50% 641,319 | 34.50% 337,780 |
| 2002 | 78.63% 686,758 | 21.37% 186,661 |
| 1995 | 58.26% 463,391 | 41.74% 331,973 |
| 1988 | 50.88% 424,626 | 49.12% 409,929 |
| 1981 | 62.88% 518,413 | 37.12% 306,043 |
| 1974 | 65.32% 474,364 | 34.68% 251,834 |
| 1969 | 65.75% 376,821 | 34.25% 196,269 |
| 1965 | 77.37% 502,971 | 22.63% 147,147 |

In the 2007 legislative election, thirteen out of the sixteen Alsatian deputies were from the UMP, one was from the opposition PS, and one was from the UMP's coalition partner, the New Centre. One deputy, Éric Straumann, was a UMP dissident.
