= Arrondissements of the Haut-Rhin department =

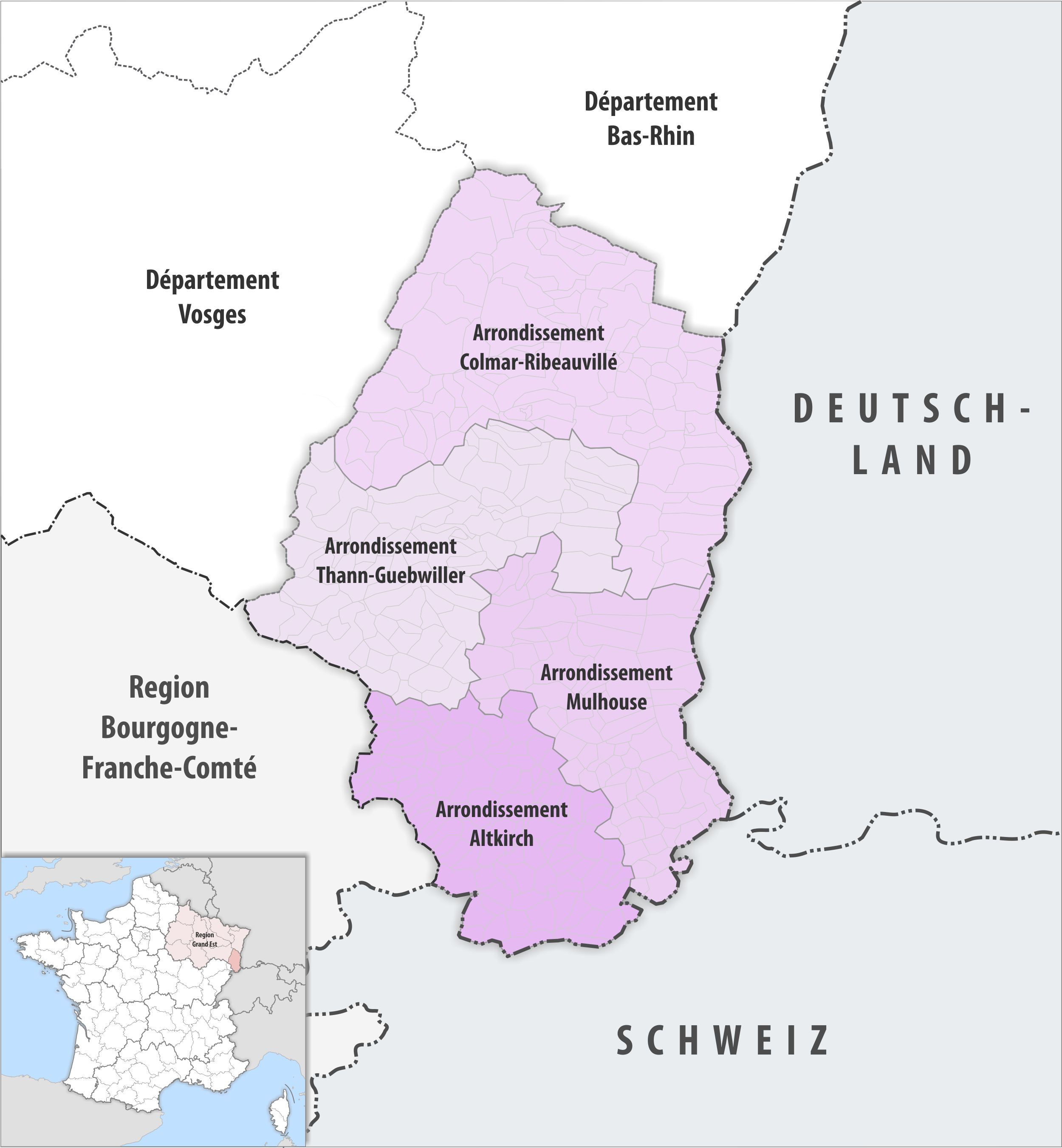
Map of arrondissements of the Haut-Rhin department.

The four arrondissements of the Haut-Rhin department are:

1. Arrondissement of Altkirch, (subprefecture: Altkirch) with 108 communes. The population of the arrondissement was 69,925 in 2021.
2. Arrondissement of Colmar-Ribeauvillé, (prefecture of the Haut-Rhin department: Colmar) with 98 communes. The population of the arrondissement was 211,178 in 2021.
3. Arrondissement of Mulhouse, (subprefecture: Mulhouse) with 79 communes. The population of the arrondissement was 356,125 in 2021.
4. Arrondissement of Thann-Guebwiller, (subprefecture: Thann) with 81 communes. The population of the arrondissement was 129,855 in 2021.

== History ==
In 1800 the arrondissements of Colmar, Altkirch, Belfort, Delémont and Porrentruy were established. In 1814 the arrondissements of Delémont and Porrentruy were disbanded (ceded to Switzerland). In 1857 Mulhouse replaced Altkirch as subprefecture. In 1871 most of the department was ceded to Germany, except the Territoire de Belfort that remained French. In 1919 the department of Haut-Rhin was restored, with the arrondissements of Colmar-Ville, Colmar-Campagne, Altkirch, Guebwiller, Mulhouse, Ribeauvillé and Thann. In 1934 the arrondissements of Colmar-Ville and Colmar-Campagne were merged into the new arrondissement of Colmar.

The borders of the arrondissements of Haut-Rhin were modified in January 2015:

- all 62 communes of the former arrondissement of Colmar to the new arrondissement of Colmar-Ribeauvillé
- five communes of the former arrondissement of Guebwiller to the arrondissement of Mulhouse
- 42 communes of the former arrondissement of Guebwiller to the new arrondissement of Thann-Guebwiller
- all 32 communes of the former arrondissement of Ribeauvillé to the new arrondissement of Colmar-Ribeauvillé
- one commune of the former arrondissement of Thann to the arrondissement of Altkirch
- two communes of the former arrondissement of Thann to the arrondissement of Mulhouse
- 49 communes of the former arrondissement of Thann to the arrondissement of Thann-Guebwiller

In January 2017 seven communes from the arrondissement of Thann-Guebwiller joined the arrondissement of Colmar-Ribeauvillé.
