= Haut-Rhin's 1st constituency =

Constituency of the National Assembly of France

1st constituency of the Haut-Rhin
- inline Constituency of the National Assembly of France

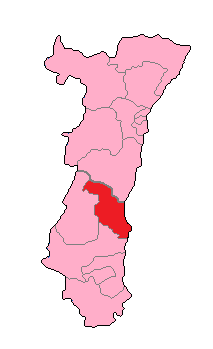
- Haut-Rhin's 1st Constituency shown within Alsace

- Haut-Rhin in France
- Deputy: Brigitte Klinkert; RE
- Department: Haut-Rhin
- Cantons: Andolsheim, Colmar-Nord, Colmar-Sud, Neuf-Brisach.
- Registered voters: 74,091

The 1st constituency of the Haut-Rhin is a French legislative constituency in the Haut-Rhin département.

== Description ==
The seat includes the town of Colmar and then stretches eastwards towards the Rhine which forms the border with Germany. The seat has followed the historic pattern of Alsace by supporting parties of the right over the PS and its allies.

== Historic Representation ==
Election	Member	Party
1958	Edmond Borocco	UNR
1962	Edmond Borocco	UNR
1967	Edmond Borocco	UDR
1968	Edmond Borocco	UDR
1973	Justin Haussherr	CDP
1978	Jean-Paul Fuchs	UDF
1981	Jean-Paul Fuchs	UDF
1986	Proportional representation - no election by constituency	
1988	Edmond Gerrer	UDF
1993	Gilbert Meyer	RPR
1997	Gilbert Meyer	RPR
2002	Gilbert Meyer	UMP
2007	Éric Straumann	UMP
2012	Éric Straumann	UMP
2017	Éric Straumann	LR
2020	Yves Hemedinger	LR
2022	Brigitte Klinkert	RE

== Election results ==
=== 2024 ===
Legislative Election 2024: Haut-Rhin's 1st constituency
Party	Candidate	Votes	%	±%
DLF	Syrielle Couval	591	1.20	−1.47
LR	Yves Hemedinger	6,547	13.32	−7.25
LO	Gilles Schaffar	341	0.69	N/A
PS (NFP)	Aïcha Fritsch	8,727	17.75	+3.01
RN	Laurent Gnaedig	16,833	34.24	+17.04
REC	Ariane Bischogg-Batma	174	0.35	−2.88
RE (Ensemble)	Brigitte Klinkert	14,945	30.40	−4.18
UL	Thiébault Zitvogel	1,007	2.05	0
Turnout		49,165	97.92	+53.62
Registered electors		78,987		
2nd round result
RE	Brigitte Klinkert	28,349	58.14	+7.93
RN	Laurent Gnaedig	20,411	41.86	N/A
Turnout		48,760	95.74	+57.14
Registered electors		79,005		
RE hold		Swing		

=== 2022 ===
Legislative Election 2022: Haut-Rhin's 1st constituency
Party	Candidate	Votes	%	±%
LREM (Ensemble)	Brigitte Klinkert	11,791	34.58	+8.34
LR (UDC)	Yves Hemedinger	7,014	20.57	-17.21
RN	Steven Schoenbeck	5,866	17.20	+5.78
PS (NUPÉS)	Aïcha Fritsch	5,027	14.74	+4.47
REC	Ariane Bischoff Batma	1,103	3.23	N/A
DLF (UPF)	Cyrielle Couval	909	2.67	+1.53
MDP	Paul Martin	831	2.44	N/A
UL (REG)	Thiébault Zitvogel	700	2.05	−1.03
Others	N/A	861	-	−
Turnout		34,102	44.30	−2.47
2nd round result
LREM (Ensemble)	Brigitte Klinkert	14,141	50.21	+16.62
LR (UDC)	Yves Hemedinger	28,163	49.79	−16.62
Turnout		28,163	38.60	−1.31
LREM gain from LR				

=== 2020 by-election ===
The deputy, Éric Straumann, was appointed Mayor of Colmar in 2020. This triggered the accumulation of mandates rule, so he left the National Assembly. His substitute candidate, Brigitte Klinkert, was Minister Delegate for Economic Inclusion, so a by-election was called.

2020 by-election: Haut-Rhin's 1st constituency
Party	Candidate	Votes	%	±%
LR	Yves Hemedinger	6,944	45.39	+7.61
EELV	Frédéric Hilbert	3,600	23.53	+18.92
RN	Christian Zimmermann	2,148	14.04	+2.62
DIV	Michel Clog	1,196	7.82	N/A
DLF	Pascal Tschaen	588	3.84	N/A
DIV	Jean-Frédéric Baechler	479	3.13	N/A
Far left	Gilles Schaffar	311	2.03	N/A
Others	N/A	32		
Turnout		15,703	20.31	−26.46
2nd round result
LR	Yves Hemedinger	8,933	63.67	−2.74
EELV	Frédéric Hilbert	5,097	36.33	N/A
Turnout		14,624	18.92	−20.99
LR hold				

=== 2017 ===
Legislative Election 2017: Haut-Rhin's 1st constituency
Party	Candidate	Votes	%	±%
LR	Éric Straumann	13,444	37.78	
LREM	Stéphanie Villemin	9,339	26.24	
FN	Marie-Hélène De Lacoste Laretmondie	4,063	11.42	
LFI	Didier Ottermann	1,901	5.34	
EELV	Frédéric Hilbert	1,642	4.61	
REG	Nadia Hoog (Unser Land)	1,096	3.08	
DVD	Philippe Rogala	1,015	2.85	
Others	N/A	3,084		
Turnout		35,584	46.77	
2nd round result
LR	Éric Straumann	20,163	66.41	
LREM	Stéphanie Villemin	10,199	33.59	
Turnout		30,362	39.91	
LR hold				

=== 2012 ===
Legislative Election 2012: Haut-Rhin's 1st constituency
Party	Candidate	Votes	%	±%
UMP	Éric Straumann	14,495	35.41	
PS	Victorine Valentin	9,005	22.00	
DVD	Gilbert Meyer	7,739	18.91	
FN	Vincent Wiss	5,375	13.13	
EELV	Frédéric Hilbert	1,241	3.03	
DIV	Antoine Walter	985	2.41	
Others	N/A	2,093		
Turnout		40,933	55.25	
2nd round result
UMP	Éric Straumann	22,753	62.21	
PS	Victorine Valentin	13,823	37.79	
Turnout		36,576	49.37	
UMP gain from DVD				

=== 2007 ===
Legislative Election 2007: Haut-Rhin's 1st Constituency 2nd round
Party	Candidate	Votes	%	±%
DVD	Éric Straumann	24,298	66.05	
UMP	Gilbert Meyer	12492	33.95	
Turnout		41,528	57.73	
DVD hold		Swing		

=== 2002 ===
Results of the 9 June and 16 June 2002 French National Assembly election in Haut-Rhin’s 1st Constituency
Candidate	Party		1st round	
Candidate	Party		Votes	%
Gilbert Meyer	Union for a Presidential Majority	UMP	20,935	52.13
Monique Marchal	Socialist Party	PS	8,376	20.86
Bruno Haebig	National Front	FN	5,031	12.53
Frederic Hilbert	The Greens	LV	1,395	3.47
Rene Becker	National Republican Movement	MNR	1,128	2.81
Brigitte Courteville	Independent	DIV	600	1.49
Gerard Probst	Ecologist	ECO	564	1.40
Christian Rousset	Workers’ Struggle	LO	546	1.36
Lydia Lacentra	Movement for France	MPF	536	1.33
Mathieu Lavarenne	Republican Pole	PR	506	1.26
Eliane Lodwitz	Communist Party	PCF	342	0.85
Vincent Wischlen	Miscellaneous Right	DVD	203	0.51
Total			40,162	100%
Registered voters			68,320	
Blank/Void ballots			1,007	2.45%
Turnout			41,169	60.26%
Abstentions			27,151	39.74%
Result			UMP GAIN FROM RPR	
