= Haut-Rhin's 3rd constituency =

Constituency of the National Assembly of France

3rd constituency of the Haut-Rhin
- inline Constituency of the National Assembly of France

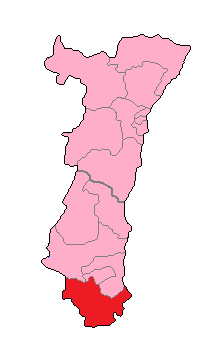
- Haut-Rhin's 3rd Constituency shown within Alsace
- Deputy: Didier Lemaire; Horizons
- Department: Haut-Rhin
- Cantons: Altkirch, Dannemarie, Ferrette, Hirsingue, Huningue.
- Registered voters: 83,583

The 3rd constituency of the Haut-Rhin is a French legislative constituency in the Haut-Rhin département.

== Description ==
Haut-Rhin's 3rd Constituency covers the southern portion of the département centred on the town of Altkirch however the largest town by far with the constituency is Saint-Louis, which lies close to Basel on the border with Switzerland. The constituency includes the area historically known as Sundgau. The constituency has elected Gaullist candidates for its entire history within the Fifth Republic.

The constituency was held by Jean-Luc Reitzer from 1988 until he stood down in 2022. In the 2012 election, he was elected on the first round of voting.

== Historic Representation ==
Election	Member	Party
1958	Joseph Perrin	UNR
1962	Joseph Perrin	UNR
1967	Alphonse Jenn	UDR
1968	Alphonse Jenn	UDR
1973	Pierre Weisenhorn	UDR
1978	Pierre Weisenhorn	RPR
1981	Pierre Weisenhorn	RPR
1986	Proportional representation – no election by constituency	
1988	Jean-Luc Reitzer	RPR
1993	Jean-Luc Reitzer	RPR
1997	Jean-Luc Reitzer	RPR
2002	Jean-Luc Reitzer	UMP
2007	Jean-Luc Reitzer	UMP
2012	Jean-Luc Reitzer	UMP
2017	Jean-Luc Reitzer	LR
2022	Didier Lemaire	HOR

== Election results ==
=== 2024 ===
Legislative Election 2024: Haut-Rhin's 3rd constituency
Party	Candidate	Votes	%	±%
DLF	Simone Fischer	579	1.03	N/A
DIV	Gaëlle Cressin	785	1.40	N/A
DVE	Antoine Waechter	1,563	2.79	−0.91
HOR (Ensemble)	Didier Lemaire	13,980	24.93	+5.27
LFI (NFP)	Bénédicte Viroulet	7,119	12.70	+0.29
LR	Thomas Zeller	7,521	13.41	−4.52
LO	Géraud Ferry	234	0.42	N/A
RN	Christian Zimmermann	21,790	38.86	+18.48
REC	Sandrine Noël	653	1.16	−2.17
UL	Jean-Denis Zoellé	1,850	3.30	−1.72
Turnout		56,074	97.79	+52.95
Registered electors		87,359		
2nd round result
HOR	Didier Lemaire	29,028	51.92	−1.96
RN	Christian Zimmermann	26,883	48.08	+1.96
Turnout		55,911	95.90	+53.38
Registered electors		87,370		
HOR hold		Swing		

=== 2022 ===
Legislative Election 2022: Haut-Rhin's 3rd constituency
Party	Candidate	Votes	%	±%
RN	Christian Zimmermann	7,838	20.38	+10.23
HOR (Ensemble)	Didier Lemaire	7,563	19.66	-12.18
LR (UDC)	Thomas Zeller	6,894	17.93	−11.89
LFI (NUPÉS)	Priscille Silva	4,774	12.41	+1.82
DIV	Jean-Luc Johaneck	2,881	7.49	N/A
LREM	Patrick Striby*	1,946	5.06	N/A
UL (REG)	Jean-Denis Zoellé	1,930	5.02	−3.66
DVE	Antoine Waechter	1,423	3.70	N/A
REC	Sandrine Noel	1,279	3.33	N/A
Others	N/A	1,932	-	−
Turnout		38,460	44.84	−0.64
2nd round result
HOR (Ensemble)	Didier Lemaire	18,757	53.88	+9.03
RN	Christian Zimmermann	16,053	46.12	N/A
Turnout		34,810	42.52	+2.78
HOR gain from LR				

* Striby stood as a dissident LREM member, without the support of the party or the Ensemble Citoyens coalition. His results as the LREM candidate in 2017 are counted against the official Ensemble Citoyens candidate for swing purposes.

=== 2017 ===
Legislative Election 2017: Haut-Rhin's 3rd constituency
Party	Candidate	Votes	%	±%
LREM	Patrick Striby	12,419	31.84	
LR	Jean-Luc Reitzer	11,630	29.82	
FN	Katia Di Leonardo	3,960	10.15	
REG	Hervé Ott (Unser Land)	3,387	8.68	
LFI	Marianne Bercot	2,195	5.63	
MEI	Antoine Waechter	1,936	4.96	
DLF	Jean-Michel Monteillet	1,052	2.70	
REG	Catherine Dahmane (Alsace First)	1,046	2.68	
Others	N/A	1,374		
Turnout		38,999	45.50	
2nd round result
LR	Jean-Luc Reitzer	18,786	55.15	
LREM	Patrick Striby	15,278	44.85	
Turnout		34,064	39.74	
LR hold				

=== 2012 ===
Legislative Election 2012: Haut-Rhin 3rd 1st Round
Party	Candidate	Votes	%	±%
UMP	Jean-Luc Reitzer	25,010	54.80	
FN	Stéphanie Faesch	6,109	13.39	
MEI	Antonie Waechter	4,802	10.52	
LV	Max Demond	4,230	9.27	
DVD	Alain Koegler	1.861	4.08	
FG	Geneviève Enggasser	1,793	3.93	
	Jean-Luc Koch	863	1.89	
NM	Alexandra Delaunay-Hartemann	739	1.62	
LO	Géraud Ferry	231	0.51	
Turnout		46,309	55.40	
UMP hold		Swing		
