= Canton of Mulhouse-1 =

Coordinates: 47.74°N 7.32°E

The canton of Mulhouse-1 is an administrative division of the Haut-Rhin department, northeastern France. It was created at the French canton reorganisation which came into effect in March 2015. Its seat is in Mulhouse.

It consists of the following communes:

1. Mulhouse (partly)
