= Gilbert Meyer =

French politician (1941–2020)

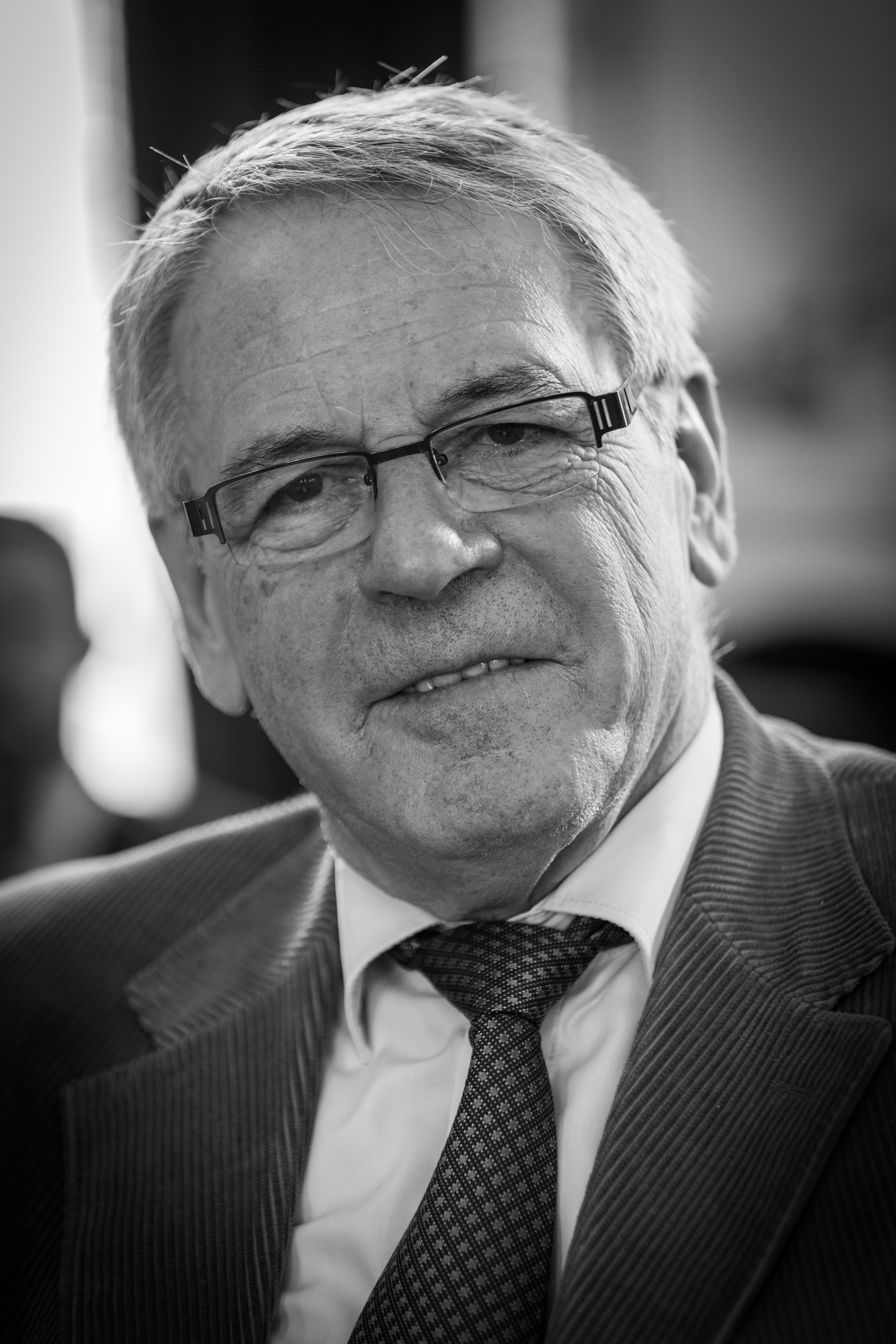
- Gilbert Meyer (2015)

Mayor of Colmar
- In office 1995 – 4 July 2020
- Preceded by: Edmond Gerrer
- Succeeded by: Éric Straumann

National Assembly
- In office 1993–2007
- Constituency: Haut-Rhin's 1st constituency

Personal details
- Born: 26 December 1941 Dessenheim, France
- Died: 21 September 2020 (aged 78) Colmar, France
- Party: Rally for the Republic (RPR); Union for a Popular Movement (UMP)
- Occupation: politician

Gilbert Meyer (26 December 1941 – 21 September 2020) was a French politician who served as a deputy in the National Assembly from 1993 to 2007, and Mayor of Colmar from 1995 to 4 July 2020.

== Biography ==
Meyer was born on 26 December 1941 in Dessenheim. From 1993 to 2007, Meyer was a member of the National Assembly for Rally for the Republic. On 1995, he became Mayor of Colmar.

In May 2020, Meyer who had been diagnosed with cancer, suffered a stroke. On 4 July 2020, Éric Straumann was appointed to succeed him as mayor. He died on 21 September 2020 aged 78.
