= Cantons of the Bas-Rhin department =

The following is a list of the 23 cantons of the Bas-Rhin department, in France, following the French canton reorganisation which came into effect in March 2015:

- Bischwiller
- Bouxwiller
- Brumath
- Erstein
- Haguenau
- Hœnheim
- Illkirch-Graffenstaden
- Ingwiller
- Lingolsheim
- Molsheim
- Mutzig
- Obernai
- Reichshoffen
- Saverne
- Schiltigheim
- Sélestat
- Strasbourg-1
- Strasbourg-2
- Strasbourg-3
- Strasbourg-4
- Strasbourg-5
- Strasbourg-6
- Wissembourg
