= Institut d'études politiques de Strasbourg =

French Grande Ecole, located in Strasbourg, France

Coordinates: 48°35′04″N 7°46′16″E

Sciences Po Strasbourg
- Institut d’études politiques de Strasbourg
- Other names: Sciences Po Strasbourg
- Type: Grande école Institut d'études politiques (public research university Political Science school)
- Established: 1945; 81 years ago
- Affiliations: Conférence des grandes écoles, Université de Strasbourg; Instituts d'études politiques
- Director: Emmanuel Droit
- Academic staff: 60 tenured professors
- Students: 1,500; 20% international
- Location: Strasbourg, France
- Language: English-only & French-only instruction
- Website: http://www.sciencespo-strasbourg.fr/

Institut d'études politiques de Strasbourg (French pronunciation: [ɛ̃stity detyd pɔlitik də stʁasbuʁ], abbreviated IEP Strasbourg) also known as Sciences Po Strasbourg ([sjɑ̃s po stʁasbuʁ]), is a Grande école located in Strasbourg, France. It was founded on 9 October 1945, with the IEP Paris (Sciences Po Paris). Since 1 January 2009, it is part of University of Strasbourg, the second largest university in France. Its current director is Emmanuel Droit. In 2024, Sciences Po Strasbourg was ranked 2nd of French schools of political science by Studiesadvisor.

== Overview ==
Sciences Po institutes are Grandes Écoles, a French institution of higher education that is separate from, but parallel and connected to the main framework of the French public university system. Similar to the Ivy League in the United States, Oxbridge in the UK, and C9 League in China, Grandes Écoles are elite academic institutions that admit students through an extremely competitive process. In 2013, the admission rate at Sciences Po Strasbourg was 14%; and 53% of accepted freshmen graduated high school summa cum laude and were in the top 10% of their high school class. Alums go on to occupy elite positions within government, administration, and corporate firms in France.

Although these institutes are more expensive than public universities in France, Grandes Écoles typically have much smaller class sizes and student bodies, and many of their programs are taught in English. International internships, study abroad opportunities, and close ties with government and the corporate world are a hallmark of the Grandes Écoles. Many of the top ranked schools in Europe are members of the Conférence des Grandes Écoles (CGE), as are the Sciences Po institutions. Degrees from Sciences Po are accredited by the Conférence des Grandes Écoles and awarded by the Ministry of National Education (France) (French: Le Ministère de L'éducation Nationale).

The institute is modeled on the former École Libre des Sciences Politiques, and as such, Sciences Po specializes in political science, but uses an interdisciplinary approach to education that provides student generalists with the high level of grounding in skills that they need in History, Law, Economic Sciences, Sociology, Political science and International relations, enriched by specialization in years 4 and 5, after a 3rd year either on a professional placement in France or overseas or alternatively studying at a foreign university. The third year of the curriculum is a year of mobility abroad, and students have the choice, they can spend two semesters in a foreign university, one semester in a university and one semester internship or they also have the opportunity to spend two semesters as a trainee. The academic course lasts five years, and it is a three-year undergraduate programme and a two-year graduate programme and the primary diploma is a master's degree.

== First cycle ==
The first two years cover a broad set of subjects ranging from Economics, History and Sociology to Corporate Finance, Modern Languages and Law (taught by Florence Benoit-Rohmer).

The third year is spent abroad, either at one of the IEP's 100+ partner universities, or as an intern in a firm or corporation (regardless of location). Partner universities include the University of Saint Andrews, Mount Allison University, Georgetown University, Aberystwyth University, Boston College and Trinity College Dublin. The IEP has recently stated it aims at developing many more partnerships with Asian universities including Toyo University, Hong Kong Baptist University and University of Seoul. Sciences Po Strasbourg also has partnership with universities of South America including Pontifical Catholic University of Rio de Janeiro and National University of Tucuman.

Since 2024, Sciences Po Strasbourg proposes a double degree in European and international politics with Saarland University. Students can join the course from the first academic year.

== Second cycle ==
On returning from their year abroad, students are required to specialise in one of the five following categories:

- Law and Public Administration
- Economy and Finances
- International Relations
- European Studies
- Politics and Societies

Sciences Po Strasbourg offers different double master's degrees :

- International Relations - Double Master in Public Affairs and International Relations with Glendon College in Toronto
- International Relations - Double Master in International Relations with Université catholique de Louvain and Saint-Louis University, Brussels
- International Relations - Double Master in International Relations with Hitotsubashi University in Tokyo
- European Studies - Double Master Franco-Germanic in European Studies with Viadrina European University in Frankfurt
- European Studies - Double Master Franco-Polish in European Studies with Jagellonne University in Cracovie
- Economy and Finances - Double Master in Corporate Strategy and Finances in Europe with Charles University in Pragues

If Sciences Po Strasbourg's students chose these double masters, they study the first year of their master's degree aboard. They return to Strasbourg for their Master 2.

In their final year, they specialise even more, e.g. students of the "Economics and Firms" branch may select three distinct Masters 2: "Gestion financière de la banque" [Financial Management of Banks], "Finance d'entreprise et Pratique des marchés financiers" [Corporate Finance and Financial Markets] or "Corporate Finance and Strategy in the EU" (taught in English). Many fifth-year lecturers are professionals.

=== Preparations for service public competitions ===
Sciences Po Strasbourg also has preparations for French civil service competitions:

- Prép'ENA : to prepare the entrance exam of the Ecole Nationale d'Administration
- Prép'INET : to prepare the entrance exam of the Institut national des études territoriales

== Campus ==
Sciences Po Strasbourg was, in first, situated in the Palais Universitaire, Strasbourg until 1988. After that, the IEP moved into the Ensemble Saint Georges until 2020. Since March 2020, Sciences Po Strasbourg is in the Cardo in Petite France, Strasbourg.

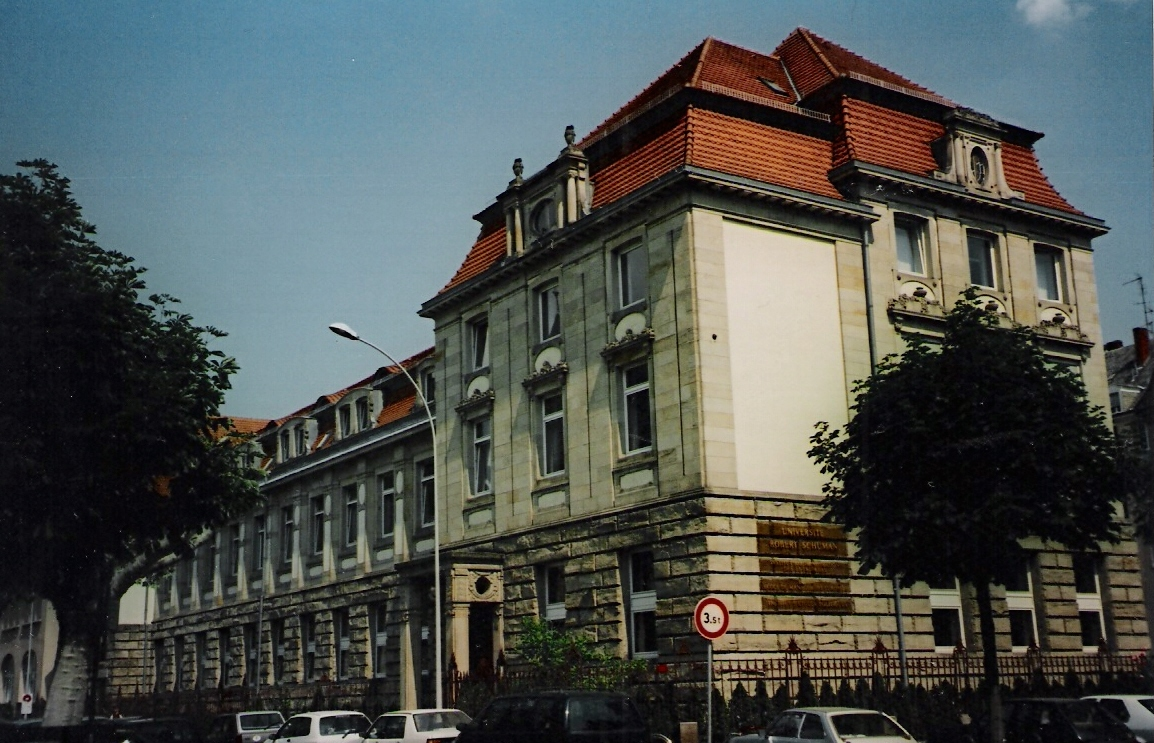
Ensemble Saint-Georges, building of Sciences Po Strasbourg from 1988 to 2020.

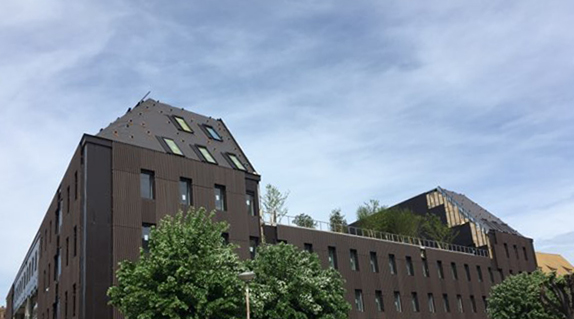
Le Cardo, building of Sciences Po Strasbourg since 2020.

== Associations ==
The numerous associations of the IEP also play a fundamental role in the students' day-to-day life.

- Bureau des Eleves (BDE) : association which organizes different events about integration of new students and help them in their schooling. Also, it organizes the Gala and the European Week at the European Parliament.
- Bureau des Sports (BDS)
- Bureau des Arts (BDA)
- Bureau des Initiatives (BDI)
- Propos
- Sciences Po Forum (SPF) : for instance, is a student research and debate association launched by students in October 2007 at the Institut d'Etudes Politiques of Strasbourg, which aims at developing an intellectual environment of excellence for all of its students, including incoming students. Through conferences, seminars, debates and many partnerships (with the academia, radios etc.), the students of the association have already addressed current debates about Political parties in Europe, Public Policies as concerns immigration or more recently the 08' Primaries in the US.
- Sciences Po Strasbourg Consulting: another society set up by students. The society is a junior enterprise, and part of the Junior Association for Development in Europe (JADE) network. Students provide various services spanning a broad expertise, ranging from translation to marketing studies. The society-firm is entirely run by students.

Their objectives, as students, is to participate in the internationalization of the institute to enhance academic achievement and increase career potential for the students of the association, through the organization of conferences, seminars or exchange visits. The final objective is to offer international visitors in Strasbourg the opportunity to meet highly motivated students who are dedicated to research and public debate.

== Directors ==
- 1945–1958 : Félix PONTEIL, historian.
- 1959–1964 : Pierre LAVIGNE, Lawyer.
- 1965–1968 : Étienne Juillard, geograph et historian.
- 1968–1969 : Jean-Claude Groshens, Lawyer et high official.
- 1969–1980 : François-Georges Dreyfus, historian.
- 1980–1988 : Gilbert Knaub, Lawyer.
- 1988–1993 : Michel Dietsch, economist.
- 1993–2001 : Renaud Dorandeu, political scientist.
- 2001–2006 : Pierre-Yves Gautier, Lawyer.
- 2006–2015 : Sylvain Schirmann, historian.
- 2015–2020 : Gabriel Eckert, Lawyer.
- 2020–2025 : Jean-Philippe Heurtin, sociologist.
- 2025- : Emmanuel Droit, Historian

== Alumni ==
- Jean-Baptiste Lemoyne (politician)
- Natalie Nougayrède
- Pieyre-Alexandre Anglade
- Julien Bayou
- Patrick Poivre d'Arvor
- Michel Liebgott
- Olivier Becht
- Jean-Luc Reitzer
