= Illzach =

Commune in Grand Est, France

Illzach Ìllzig (Alsatian)
- Commune
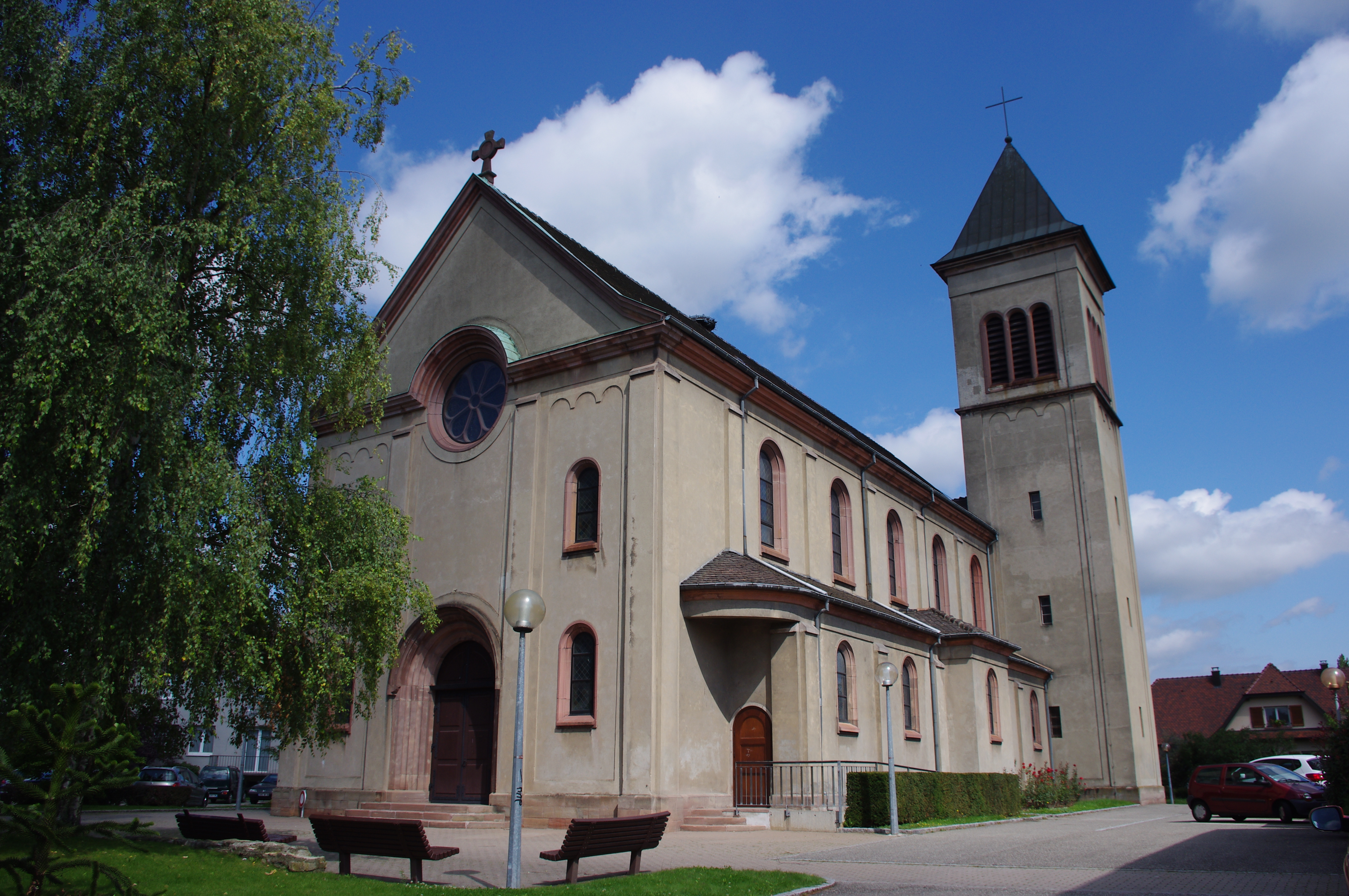
- The church in Illzach

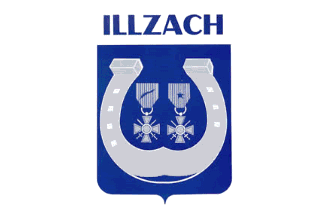
- Flag Coat of arms
- Location of Illzach
- Location within France Location within Grand Est
- Coordinates: 47°46′59″N 7°20′55″E
- Country: France
- Region: Grand Est
- Department: Haut-Rhin
- Arrondissement: Mulhouse
- Canton: Mulhouse-3
- Intercommunality: Mulhouse Alsace Agglomération

Government
  - Mayor (2020–2026): Jean-Luc Schildknecht (DVD)
- Area^{1}: 7.50 km^{2} (2.90 sq mi)
- Highest elevation: 237 m (778 ft)
- Lowest elevation: 228 m (748 ft)
- Population (2023): 14,923
  - Density: 1,990/km^{2} (5,150/sq mi)
- Time zone: UTC+01:00 (CET)
  - Summer (DST): UTC+02:00 (CEST)
- INSEE/Postal code: 68154 /68110
- ^{1} French Land Register data, which excludes lakes, ponds, glaciers > 1 km^{2} (0.386 sq mi or 247 acres) and river estuaries.

Illzach (French pronunciation: [ilzak]), in Alsatian Ìllzig (Alemannic German pronunciation: [ˈɪltsik]) is a commune in the Haut-Rhin department in Alsace in north-eastern France.

It is located in the north side of the Mulhouse metropolitan area, and forms part of the Mulhouse Alsace Agglomération, the inter-communal local government body for that area.

== Population ==
Historical population
Year	Pop.	±% p.a.
1968	10,575	—
1975	14,988	+5.11%
1982	15,396	+0.38%
1990	15,485	+0.07%
1999	14,947	−0.39%
2007	14,889	−0.05%
2012	14,812	−0.10%
2017	14,691	−0.16%
2023	14,923	+0.26%
Source: INSEE

== See also ==
- Communes of the Haut-Rhin département
