= European Collectivity of Alsace =

French territorial collectivity

European Collectivity of Alsace Collectivité européenne d'Alsace (French)
- Logo

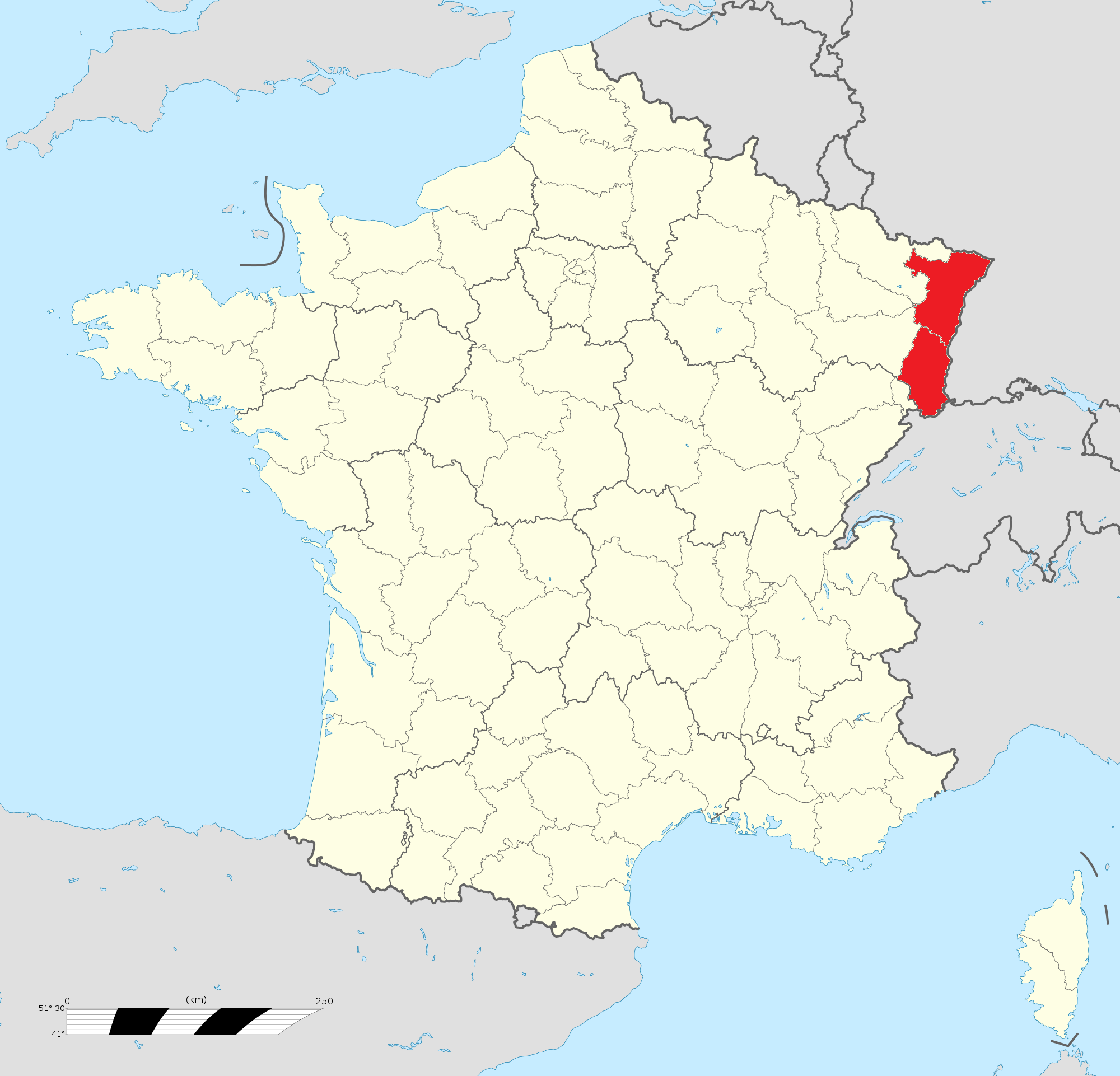
- Status: Collectivity of the French Republic
- Capital and largest city: Strasbourg; 48°35′N 7°45′E
- Official language: French
- Regional languages: Alsatian; Welche; Meridional Frankish; Rhine Frankish
- Demonym: Alsatian

Government
  - President of the Assembly: Frédéric Bierry
- Legislature: Assembly of Alsace

Establishment
  - Creation: 1 January 2021

Area
  - Total: 8,280 km^{2} (3,200 sq mi)

Population
  - 2021 census: 1,919,745
- ISO 3166 code: FR-6AE

The European Collectivity of Alsace (French: Collectivité européenne d'Alsace, pronounced [kɔlɛktivite øʁɔpeɛn dalzas], abbr. CEA) (Note: Alsatian: Europäischa Gebiatskärwerschàft Elsàss; German: Europäische Gebietskörperschaft Elsass) is a territorial collectivity in the Alsace region of France. On 1 January 2021, the territorial collectivities of the Bas-Rhin and Haut-Rhin departments merged to form a new territorial collectivity, but remained part of the Grand Est region. The creation of this new entity was approved by the French Parliament on 25 July 2019 and Law 2019-816, which delimits its powers, was promulgated on 2 August 2019.

Alsatian voters had already voted in favour of the creation of a single territorial collectivity in a referendum in 2013; however, in the less populous of the two departments, Haut-Rhin, a majority of voters had rejected the proposal.

On April 8, 2026, a bill to withdraw the CEA from the Grand Est region and grant it the competences of both a department and a region was passed by the French National Assembly.

== History ==
The original Region of Alsace, created in 1956, ceased to exist on 1 January 2016, when the French parliament voted to merge several administrative regions, reducing their number from 22 to 18.

== Status ==
Alsace has an intermediary status: its competencies are those of a department, plus some of the competencies of a region. As a result, Alsace is less autonomous than Corsica or the overseas departments and regions.

== Languages ==
While French is the sole official language of the country according to Article 2 of the Constitution of France, Law 2019-816 contains provisions to promote regional languages in schools. The collectivity will also be tasked with creating a Committee related to the Alsatian language and culture, with a focus on the German language spoken in Alsace. This last provision is closely related to Chapter 3 and Chapter 4 of the Aachen Treaty.

== Transport in Alsace ==
The A35 motorway runs through Alsace from south to north, covering approximately 180 km. This non-toll motorway was transferred from the state to the European Collectivity of Alsace on January 1, 2021, except for the section passing through the Strasbourg Eurometropolis. Alsace is also served by two major east-west axes: the A4 motorway (Paris - Strasbourg), operated by Sanef, and the A36 motorway (Beaune - Mulhouse), operated by APRR.

Alsace was one of the pioneering regions in railway development, with Nicolas Koechlin beginning the construction of the first railway lines as early as 1839. Today, the rail network offers dense coverage of the region. The Strasbourg to Basel line, known as the "Plain of Alsace Line", is serviced by regional trains (TER) running at speeds of up to 200 km/h. This line, along with the Alsatian portion of the Paris-Strasbourg line, forms part of an important transport corridor connecting Switzerland, Luxembourg, and Belgium. Alsace is also strategically positioned at the intersection of two high-speed rail lines, thanks to the LGV Est européenne and the LGV Rhin-Rhône. The European Collectivity of Alsace could play a role in reopening cross-border rail lines between Haguenau and Rastatt, and between Colmar and Vieux-Brisach.

The Rhine River is Europe's primary navigable waterway. The Central Commission for the Navigation of the Rhine has been headquartered in Strasbourg since 1920. The ports of Strasbourg and Mulhouse are the second and third largest river ports in France.

Alsace is home to two airports: the Basel-Mulhouse airport, the only bi-national airport in the world, and Strasbourg-Entzheim airport.
