= List of mayors of Colmar =

This is a list of mayors of Colmar in Alsace.

- 1789 - 1790 : Daniel Adam Eggerle
- 1790 - 1792 : Etienne Ignace de Salomon
- 1792 - 1795 : Nicolas Sébastien Simon
- 1795 - 1795 : André Rockenstroh
- 1795 - 1799 : Emmanuel Mussel
- 1799 - 1800 : Jean Buob
- 1800 - 1813 : Marx Anton Richert
- 1813 - 1815 : Dr Gabriel Louis François Anaclet Morel
- 1815 - 1816 : Jean Buob
- 1816 - 1817 : Jean Philibert de Minangoy
- 1817 - 1830 : baron Jean Chrysostôme Louis de Muller
- 1830 - 1841 : Dr Gabriel Louis François Anaclet Morel
- 1841 - 1855 : Charles Joseph Chappuis
- 1855 - 1877 : Marie Hercule Jean-Baptiste de Peyerimhoff
- 1877 - 1877 : Wilhelm Grote (Bürgermeisterverwalter)
- 1877 - 1877 : Adalbert von Neumann (Bürgermeisterverwalter)
- 1877 - 1879 : Hermann Ernst Julius Keetmann (Bürgermeisterverwalter)
- 1879 - 1880 : baron Friedrich von Reichlin-Meidegg (Bürgermeisterverwalter)
- 1880 - 1896 : Camille Schlumberger
- 1896 - 1898 : Jean Baptiste Victor Fleurent
- 1898 - 1905 : Auguste Riegert
- 1905 - 1914 : Daniel Blumenthal
- 1914 - 1918 : Friedrich Dieffenbach
- 1918 - 1918 : Max Lehmann
- 1918 - 1918 : Jean-Georges Baer
- 1918 - 1922 : Antoine François Conrath
- 1922 - 1929 : Charles Sengel
- 1929 - 1935 : Eugène Hertzog
- 1935 - 1940 : Jacques Edouard Richard
- 1940 - 1944 : Luzian Manny (Oberstadtkommissar)
- 1944 - 1945 : Karl Schmidt (Oberbürgermeister)
- 1945 - 1945 : Karl Hellstern (Stadtkommissar)
- 1945 - 1947 : Jacques Edouard Richard
- 1947 - 1977 : Joseph Rey
- 1977 - 1995 : Edmond Gerrer
- 1995 - 2020 : Gilbert Meyer
- 2020–present : Éric Straumann
