= Éric Straumann =

French politician

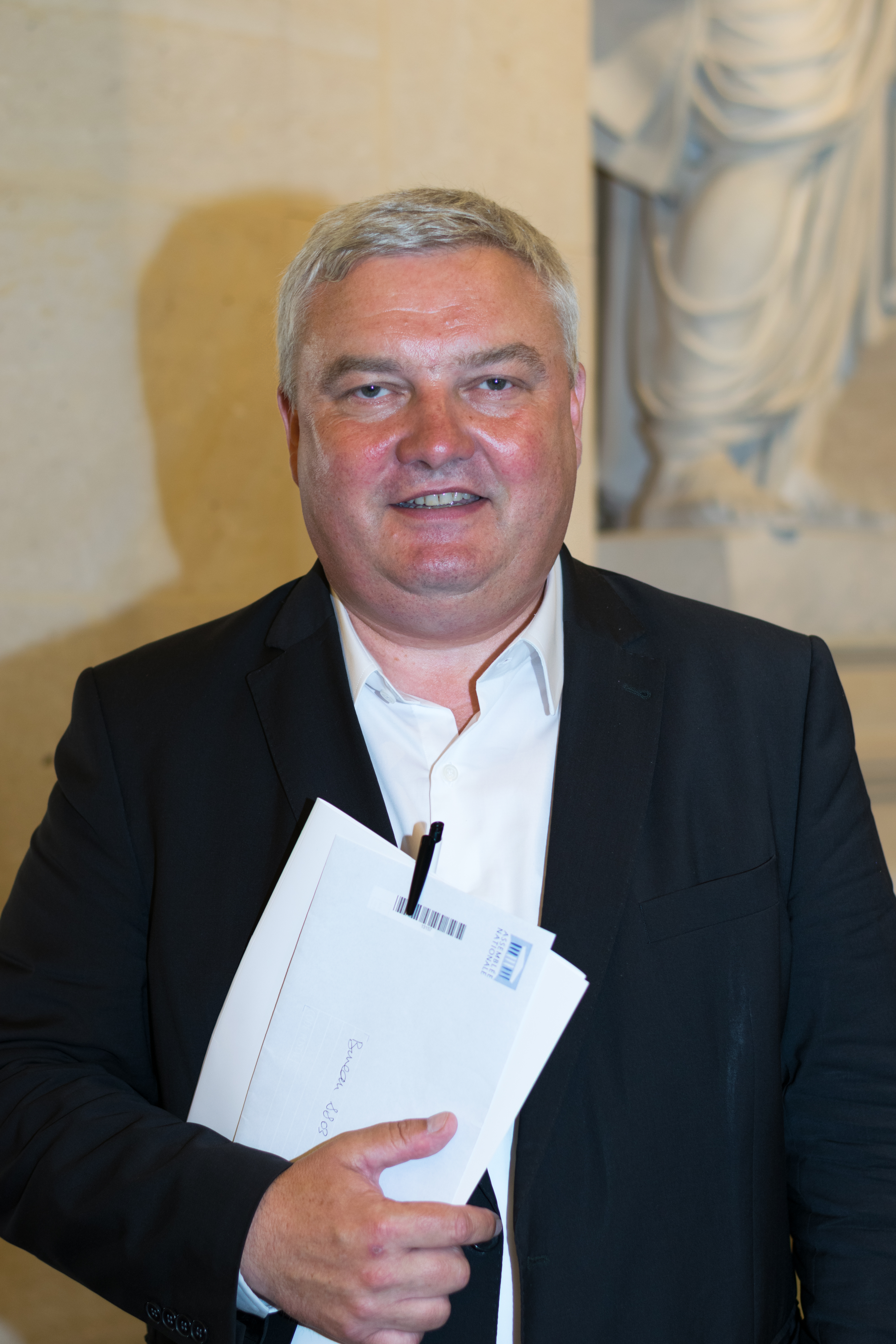
- Éric Straumann at the National Assembly, in June 2017.

Deputy for Haut-Rhin's 1st constituency
- In office 20 June 2007 – 28 July 2020
- Preceded by: Gilbert Meyer
- Succeeded by: Yves Hemedinger (Note: de jure successor was Straumann's substitute candidate, Brigitte Klinkert, but as she was Minister Delegate for Economic Inclusion, she was recorded as minister for just one day, then a by-election was called)

Mayor of Colmar
- Incumbent
- Assumed office 4 July 2020
- Preceded by: Gilbert Meyer

Personal details
- Born: 17 August 1964 (age 61) Colmar, Haut-Rhin, France
- Party: LR (2015–present)
- Other political affiliations: UMP (before 2015)
- Profession: Professor of Economics and Management

Éric Straumann (born 17 August 1964 in Colmar) is a French politician of the Republicans who served as a member of the National Assembly from 2007 until 2020, representing the Haut-Rhin department.

== Political career ==
Straumann was a member of the Union for a Popular Movement before joining the Republicans.

In parliament, Straumann served on the Committee on Legal Affairs (2007-2012), the Committee on Economic Affairs (2012-2020), and the Committee on European Affairs (2017-2020).

In addition to his committee assignments, Straumann was briefly a substitute member of the French delegation to the Parliamentary Assembly of the Council of Europe (PACE) in 2020, where he served on the Committee on Migration, Refugees and Displaced Persons.

On 4 July 2020, Straumann was appointed Mayor of Colmar. This triggered the accumulation of mandates rule, so he left the National Assembly. His substitute candidate, Brigitte Klinkert, was Minister Delegate for Economic Inclusion, so a by-election was called for his constituency. The by-election was won by Yves Hemedinger.

== Political positions ==
In the Republicans' 2016 presidential primaries, Straumann publicly endorsed Bruno Le Maire as the party's candidate for the 2017 French presidential election. Ahead of the party's 2017 leadership election, he supported Laurent Wauquiez as new chairman.
