= Didier Lemaire =

French politician (born 1975)

Member of the National Assembly for Haut-Rhin's 3rd constituency
- In office 22 June 2022 – 9 June 2024
- Preceded by: Jean-Luc Reitzer
- Succeeded by: to be elected

Personal details
- Born: 23 July 1975 (age 50) Altkirch, France
- Political party: Horizons

Didier Lemaire (born 23 July 1975) is a French politician. As a member of Horizons, he was elected member of parliament for Haut-Rhin's 3rd constituency in the 2022 French legislative election.

== See also ==
- List of deputies of the 16th National Assembly of France
