= Georges Bourgeois =

French politician (1913–1978)

Georges Bourgeois was a French judicial officer and politician. He was born on April 20, 1913, in Mulhouse and died on August 1, 1978, in the same city.

== Career ==
Judicial officer in Mulhouse from 1947, Georges Bourgeois got involved at the local level by becoming mayor of Pulversheim in 1945 and remained so until 1977. General councilor of Haut-Rhin in the canton of Ensisheim from 1945 to 1973, he was the president of the departmental council between December 1948 and September 1973, when he was defeated in the cantonal elections and retired.

At the national level, he was senator for Haut-Rhin from 1948 to 1951 then deputy for the department, elected on the list of the RPF then that of the CNIP and the Social Republicans (1951-1958), and of the 2nd constituency of Haut-Rhin (1958-1962).

During his mandates, he belonged to the various Gaullist movements.

He was also a member of various European institutions such as the Council of Europe, the Consultative Assembly of the Council of Europe and the Assembly of the Western European Union.
