= Brigitte Klinkert =

French politician

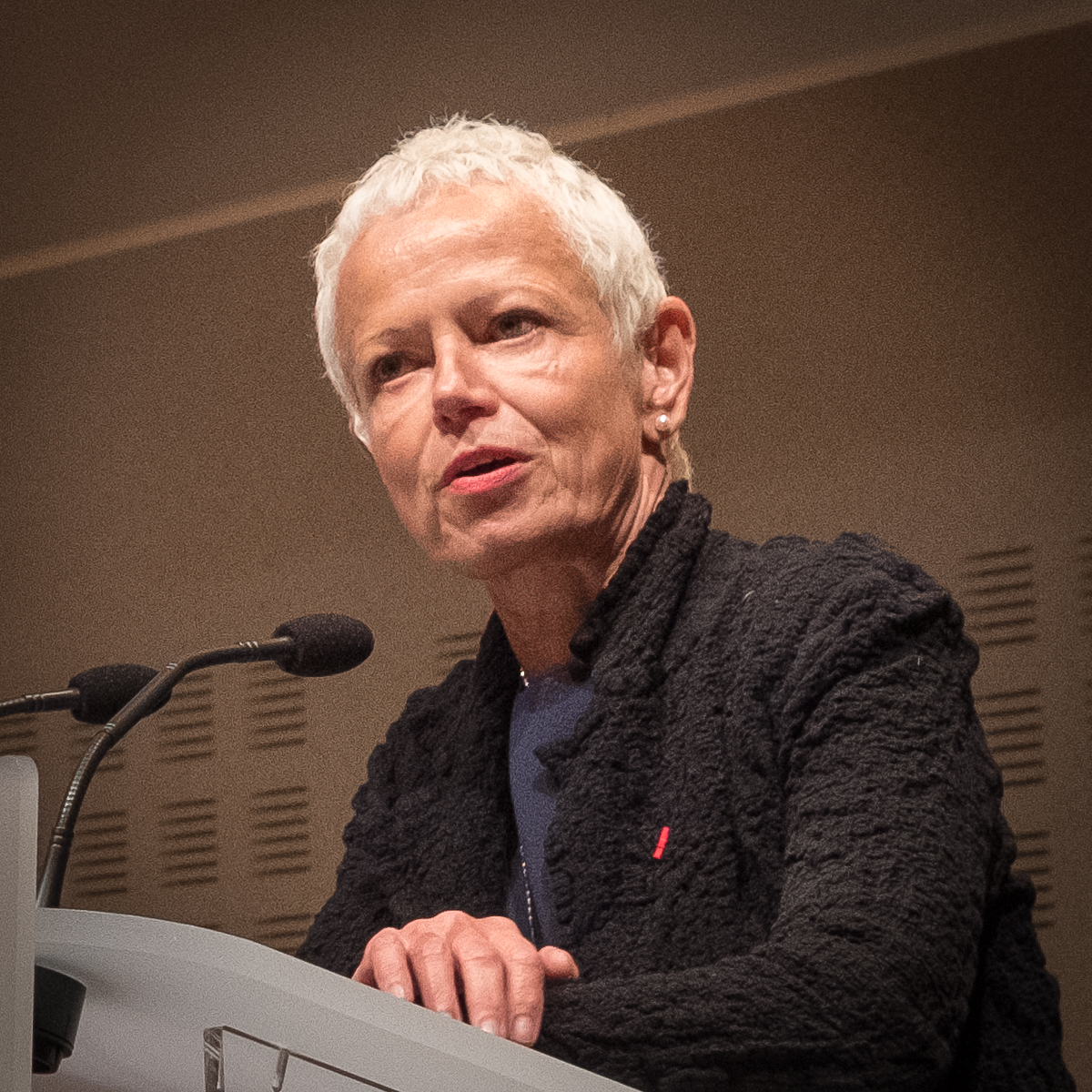
- Brigitte Klinkert in 2018

Member of the National Assembly for Haut-Rhin's 1st constituency
- Incumbent
- Assumed office 22 June 2022
- Preceded by: Yves Hemedinger

Minister Delegate for Integration
- In office 6 July 2020 – 22 June 2022
- President: Emmanuel Macron
- Prime Minister: Jean Castex

President of the Departmental Council of Haut-Rhin
- In office 1 September 2017 – 29 July 2020
- Preceded by: Éric Straumann
- Succeeded by: Rémy With

Personal details
- Born: Brigitte Anne Francine Klinkert; 22 July 1956 (age 70) Colmar, France
- Party: Renaissance
- Education: Institut Régional d'Administration de Metz

Brigitte Klinkert (born 22 July 1956) is a French politician who became the Member of Parliament for Haut-Rhin's 1st constituency in the 2022 French legislative election. She served as Minister Delegate in charge of Integration attached to the Minister of Labour, Employment and Integration in the government of Prime Minister Jean Castex from 2020 to 2022.

== Early life and education ==
Brigitte Anne Francine Klinkert was born on 22 July 1956 in Colmar, Alsace, France. Her grandfather, Joseph Rey, had been the mayor of Colmar from 1947 to 1977. After secondary school in a private catholic institution, she studied law (1976) before graduating from the Metz Regional Institute of Administration in 1978.

== Political career ==
Klinkert started her career as municipal councilor of Colmar in 1983, a position she will keep until 2020. She joined the departmental council of Haut-Rhin in 1994. She became President of the Haut-Rhin department in 2017, the first woman elected in that position, she left the position to enter the Castex government in July 2020, as Minister delegate for Integration under the direction of Minister of Labour, Élisabeth Borne.

After being a member of UDF from 1998 to 2002, Klinkert joined UMP then, after the party changed its named, LR in 2015 before leaving in 2019.

Klinkert was elected in Haut-Rhin's 1st constituency at the 2022 French legislative election.

== Political positions ==
Klinkert is considered to be part of her parliamentary group's conservative wing.

== Recognition ==
In 2021 Klinkert received the Grand Cross of the Order of Merit of the Federal Republic of Germany.

== See also ==
- Castex Government

== Sources ==
- Biographie Brigitte Klinkert (in French)
- Resumé Brigitte Klinkert (in French)
- "Qui est Brigitte Klinkert, la première femme présidente du Haut-Rhin ?". Rue89 Strasbourg (in French). 9 October 2017.
