= Yves Hemedinger =

French politician

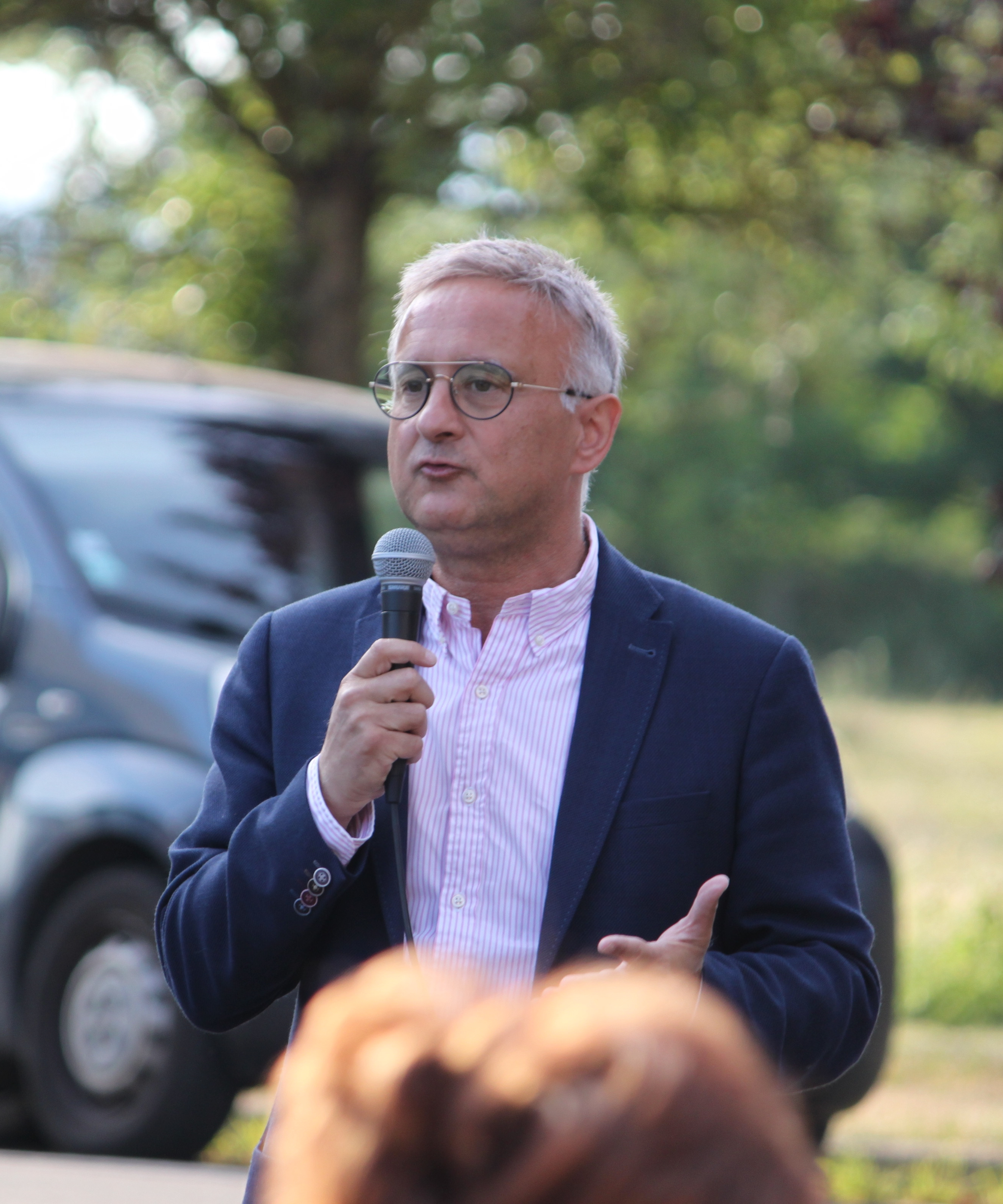
Yves Hemedinger June 2022

Yves Hemedinger (born 23 October 1965) is a French Republican politician was elected Member of Parliament for Haut-Rhin's 1st constituency in a 2020 by-election.

In the 2022 French legislative election, he lost his seat to former minister Brigitte Klinkert.
