= Cantons of Strasbourg =

Cantons in Grand Est, France

Coordinates: 48.58°N 7.75°E

The cantons of Strasbourg are administrative divisions of the Bas-Rhin department, in northeastern France. Since the French canton reorganisation which came into effect in March 2015, the city of Strasbourg is subdivided into 6 cantons. Their seat is in Strasbourg.

== Cantons ==
Name	Population (2019)	Cantonal Code
Canton of Strasbourg-1	48,109	6717
Canton of Strasbourg-2	44,877	6718
Canton of Strasbourg-3	50,667	6719
Canton of Strasbourg-4	43,373	6720
Canton of Strasbourg-5	40,527	6721
Canton of Strasbourg-6	59,675	6722
