= Altkirch =

Subprefecture and commune in Grand Est, France

Altkirch Àltkìrech (Alemannic German)
- Subprefecture and commune
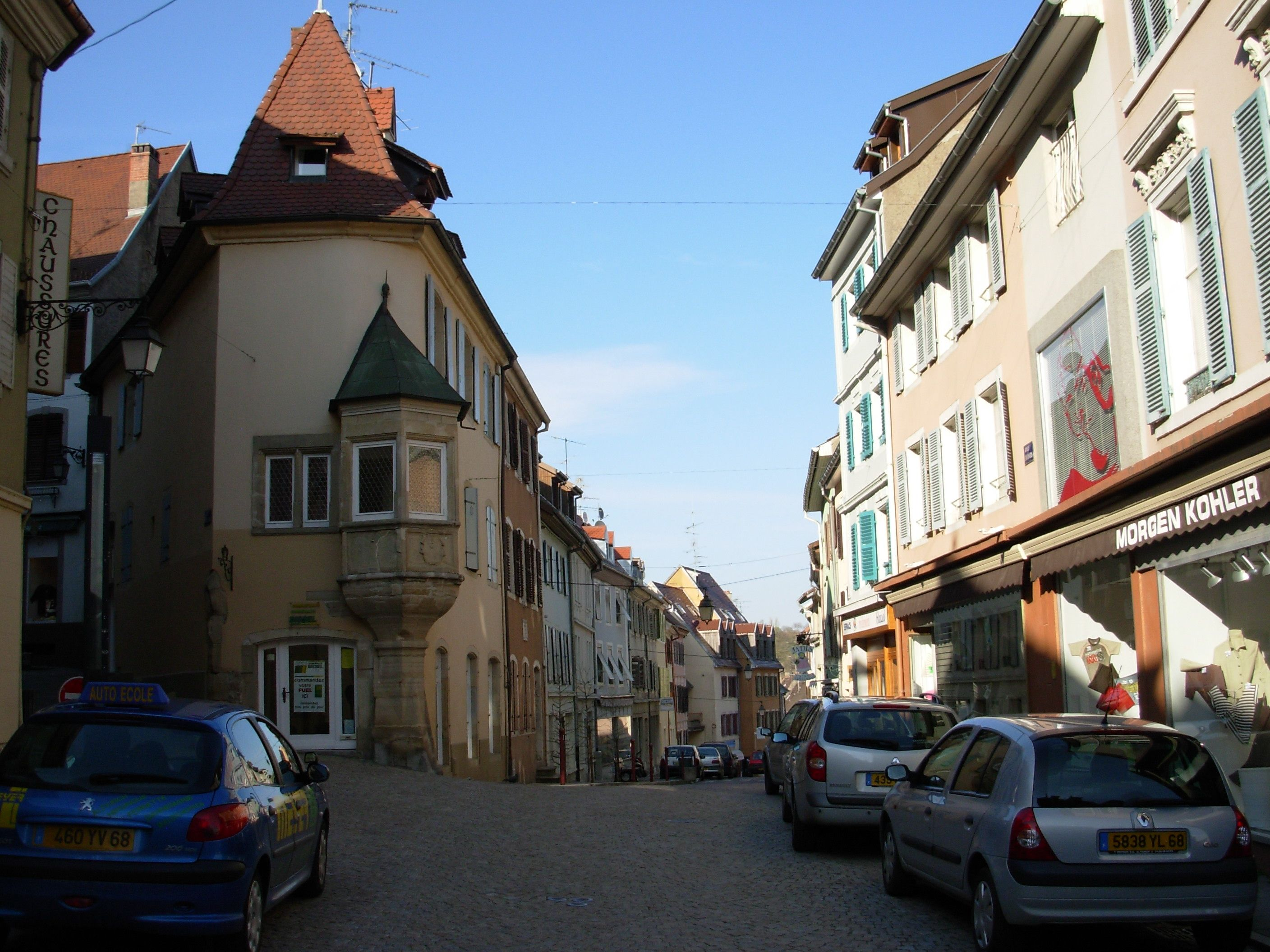
- The historic centre of Altkirch

- Flag Coat of arms
- Location of Altkirch
- Location within France Location within Grand Est
- Coordinates: 47°37′N 7°14′E
- Country: France
- Region: Grand Est
- Department: Haut-Rhin
- Arrondissement: Altkirch
- Canton: Altkirch
- Intercommunality: CC Sundgau

Government
  - Mayor (2020–2026): Nicolas Jander
- Area^{1}: 9.54 km^{2} (3.68 sq mi)
- Elevation: 310 m (1,020 ft)
- Highest elevation: 392 m (1,286 ft)
- Lowest elevation: 274 m (899 ft)
- Population (2023): 5,687
  - Density: 596/km^{2} (1,540/sq mi)
- Time zone: UTC+01:00 (CET)
  - Summer (DST): UTC+02:00 (CEST)
- INSEE/Postal code: 68004 /68130
- Dialling codes: 0389
- ^{1} French Land Register data, which excludes lakes, ponds, glaciers > 1 km^{2} (0.386 sq mi or 247 acres) and river estuaries.

Altkirch (French: [altkiʁʃ], German: [ˈaltkɪʁç]; Alsatian: Àltkìrech; Frainc-Comtou: Artçhelitçhe) is a commune in the Haut-Rhin department in Alsace in north-eastern France.

The town is traditionally regarded as the capital of Sundgau.

== Etymology ==
The name of the commune means old church (Alsatian: Àlta Kìrch or Àlta Kìrech; German: Alte Kirche).

== History ==
In the 1370s, the citizens of Altkirch battled and won against a company of Gugler mercenaries.

== Demography ==
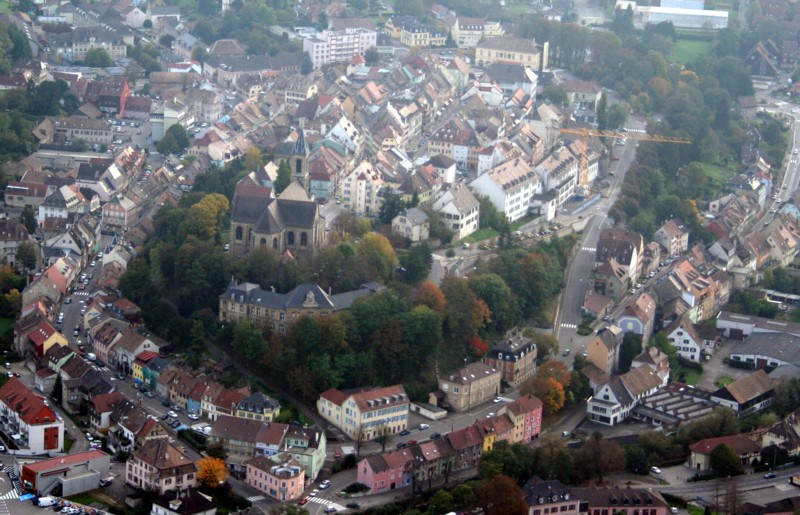
Altkirch

Its inhabitants are known as Altkirchois.

The resident population number of 5,700 is rather deceptive as some 15,500 people will be in town on a typical working day (4500 working, 3000 studying, 3000 for medical treatment and another 5000 divided between shopping, administrative offices, cultural and sporting activities).

Historical population
Year	Pop.	±% p.a.
1968	5,118	—
1975	5,319	+0.55%
1982	5,268	−0.14%
1990	5,090	−0.43%
1999	5,386	+0.63%
2007	5,644	+0.59%
2012	5,747	+0.36%
2017	5,737	−0.03%
2023	5,687	−0.15%
Source: INSEE

== Sister cities ==
- Azerbaijan (Nagorno-Karabakh) Füzuli (2016)

== See also ==
- Château d'Altkirch - destroyed castle in the town.
- Communes of the Haut-Rhin department
