= Haut-Rhin =

Department of France

Haut-Rhin 's Owerlànd / Owerelsàss (Alemannic German)
- Department of France
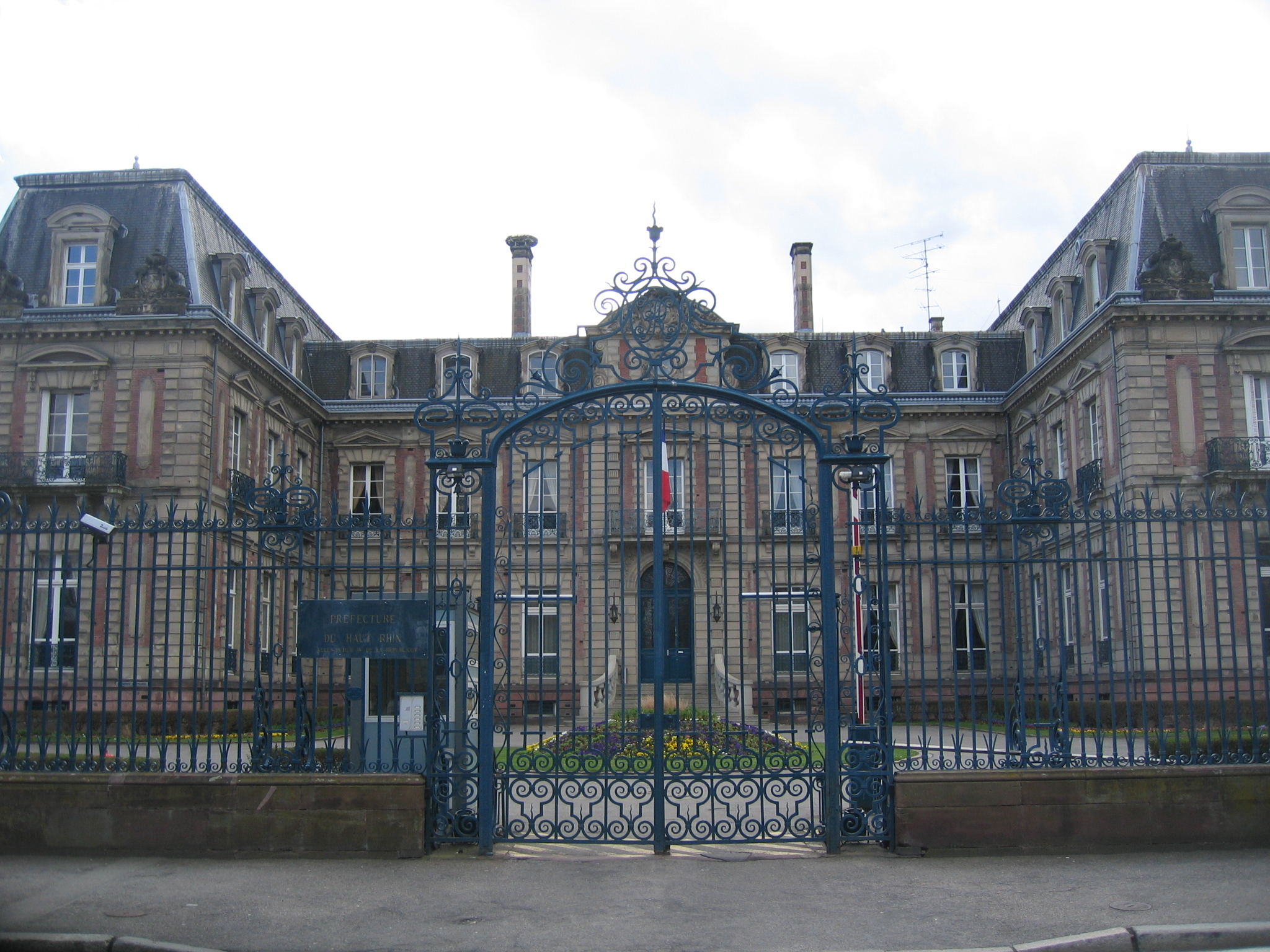
- Prefecture building of the Haut-Rhin department, in Colmar

- Coat of arms

- Location of Haut-Rhin in France
- Interactive map of Haut-Rhin
- Coordinates: 47°57′51″N 7°19′11″E
- Country: France
- Region: Grand Est
- Prefecture: Colmar
- Subprefectures: Altkirch; Mulhouse; Thann

Government
  - Prefect: Louis Laugier

Area^{1}
  - Total: 3,525 km^{2} (1,361 sq mi)

Population (2023)
  - Total: 770,738
  - Rank: 29th
  - Density: 218.6/km^{2} (566.3/sq mi)
- Time zone: UTC+1 (CET)
  - Summer (DST): UTC+2 (CEST)
- Department number: 68
- Arrondissements: 4
- Cantons: 17
- Communes: 366
- ^1 French Land Register data, which exclude estuaries and lakes, ponds and glaciers larger than 1 km^{2}

Haut-Rhin (French pronunciation: [oʁɛ̃]) is a department in the Grand Est region, France, bordering both Germany and Switzerland. It is named after the river Rhine. Its name means Upper Rhine. Haut-Rhin is the smaller and less populated of the two departments of the former administrative Alsace region, the other being Bas-Rhin (Lower Rhine), especially after the 1871 cession of the southern territory known since 1922 as the Territoire de Belfort, although it is still rather densely populated compared to the rest of metropolitan France. It had a population of 770,738 in 2023.

On 1 January 2021, the départemental collectivities of Bas-Rhin and Haut-Rhin were merged into the European Collectivity of Alsace.

== History ==
Haut-Rhin is one of the original 83 départements, created during the French Revolution, on 4 March 1790 through the application of the law of 22 December 1789 in respect of the southern half of the province of Alsace (Haute-Alsace).

Its boundaries have been modified many times:

- 1798, it absorbed Mulhouse, formerly a free city, and the last Swiss enclave in the south of Alsace;
- 1800, it absorbed the whole département of Mont-Terrible;
- 1814, it lost the territories which had been part of Mont-Terrible, which were returned to Switzerland, except for the former County of Montbéliard;
- 1816, it lost Montbéliard, which was transferred to the département of Doubs;
- 1871, it was mostly annexed by the German Empire (Treaty of Frankfurt); the remaining French part formed the Territoire de Belfort in 1922;
- 1919, it was reverted to France (Treaty of Versailles) but remains administratively separated from Belfort.
- 1940, it was annexed de facto by Nazi Germany.
- 1944, it was recovered by France.

== Geography ==
Haut-Rhin is bordered by the Territoire de Belfort and Vosges départements and the Vosges Mountains to the west, the Bas-Rhin département to the North, Switzerland to the south and its eastern border with Germany is also the Rhine. In the centre of the département lies a fertile plain. The climate is semi-continental.

=== Subdivisions ===
The department consists of the following arrondissements:

- Altkirch
- Colmar-Ribeauvillé
- Mulhouse
- Thann-Guebwiller

=== Principal towns ===
The most populous commune is Mulhouse; the prefecture Colmar is the second-most populous. As of 2023, there are 9 communes with more than 12,000 inhabitants:

Commune	Population (2023)
Mulhouse	104,978
Colmar	66,970
Saint-Louis	22,805
Wittenheim	15,553
Illzach	14,923
Rixheim	14,380
Kingersheim	13,354
Riedisheim	12,200
Cernay	12,057

== Demographics ==
Population development between 1801 and 2023:

Historical population

Year	Pop.	±% p.a.
1801	272,334	—
1806	299,877	+1.95%
1821	326,633	+0.57%
1831	375,473	+1.40%
1841	409,683	+0.88%
1851	436,744	+0.64%
1861	459,554	+0.51%
1871	458,873	−0.01%
1880	461,942	+0.07%
1890	471,609	+0.21%
1900	495,209	+0.49%
1910	517,865	+0.45%
1921	468,943	−0.90%
1931	516,726	+0.98%

Year	Pop.	±% p.a.
1936	507,551	−0.36%
1946	471,705	−0.73%
1954	509,647	+0.97%
1962	547,920	+0.91%
1968	585,018	+1.10%
1975	635,209	+1.18%
1982	650,372	+0.34%
1990	671,319	+0.40%
1999	708,025	+0.59%
2007	742,408	+0.59%
2012	755,202	+0.34%
2017	764,030	+0.23%
2023	770,738	+0.15%

== Economy ==
Haut-Rhin is one of the richest French départements. Mulhouse is the home of the Stellantis Mulhouse Plant automobile factory, where the Peugeot 2008 and Peugeot 508 are currently built. The lowest unemployment rate in France can be found in the Southern Sundgau region (approximately 2%). The countryside is marked by hills. Many Haut-Rhinois work in Switzerland, especially in the chemical industries of Basel, but commute from France where living costs are lower. However, the region does have some of France's worst socio-economic inequalities; Mulhouse has long been one of France's poorest major cities.

== Law ==
Alsace and the adjacent Moselle department have a legal system slightly different from the rest of France. The statutes in question date from the period 1871–1919 when the area was part of the German Empire. With the return of Alsace-Lorraine to France by the Treaty of Versailles in 1919, Paris accepted that Alsace and Moselle should retain some local laws in respect of certain matters, especially with regard to hunting, economic life, local government relationships, health insurance and social rights. It includes notably the absence of any formal separation between church and state: several mainstream denominations of the Christian church benefit from state funding, in contrast to principles applied in the rest of France.

== Politics ==
=== Presidential elections 2nd round ===
Election	Winning candidate	Party	%	2nd place candidate	Party	%
2022	Emmanuel Macron	LREM	52.90	Marine Le Pen	FN	47.10
2017	Emmanuel Macron	LREM	57.97	Marine Le Pen	FN	42.03
2012	Nicolas Sarkozy	UMP	63.33	François Hollande	PS	36.67
2007	Nicolas Sarkozy	UMP	65.39	Ségolène Royal	PS	34.61
2002	Jacques Chirac	RPR	77.65	Jean-Marie Le Pen	FN	22.35
1995	Jacques Chirac	RPR	57.26	Lionel Jospin	PS	42.74

=== Current National Assembly Representatives ===
Constituency	Member	Party
Haut-Rhin's 1st constituency	Brigitte Klinkert	Renaissance
Haut-Rhin's 2nd constituency	Hubert Ott	MoDem
Haut-Rhin's 3rd constituency	Didier Lemaire	Horizons
Haut-Rhin's 4th constituency	Raphaël Schellenberger	The Republicans
Haut-Rhin's 5th constituency	Olivier Becht	Renaissance
Haut-Rhin's 6th constituency	Bruno Fuchs	MoDem

== Tourism ==
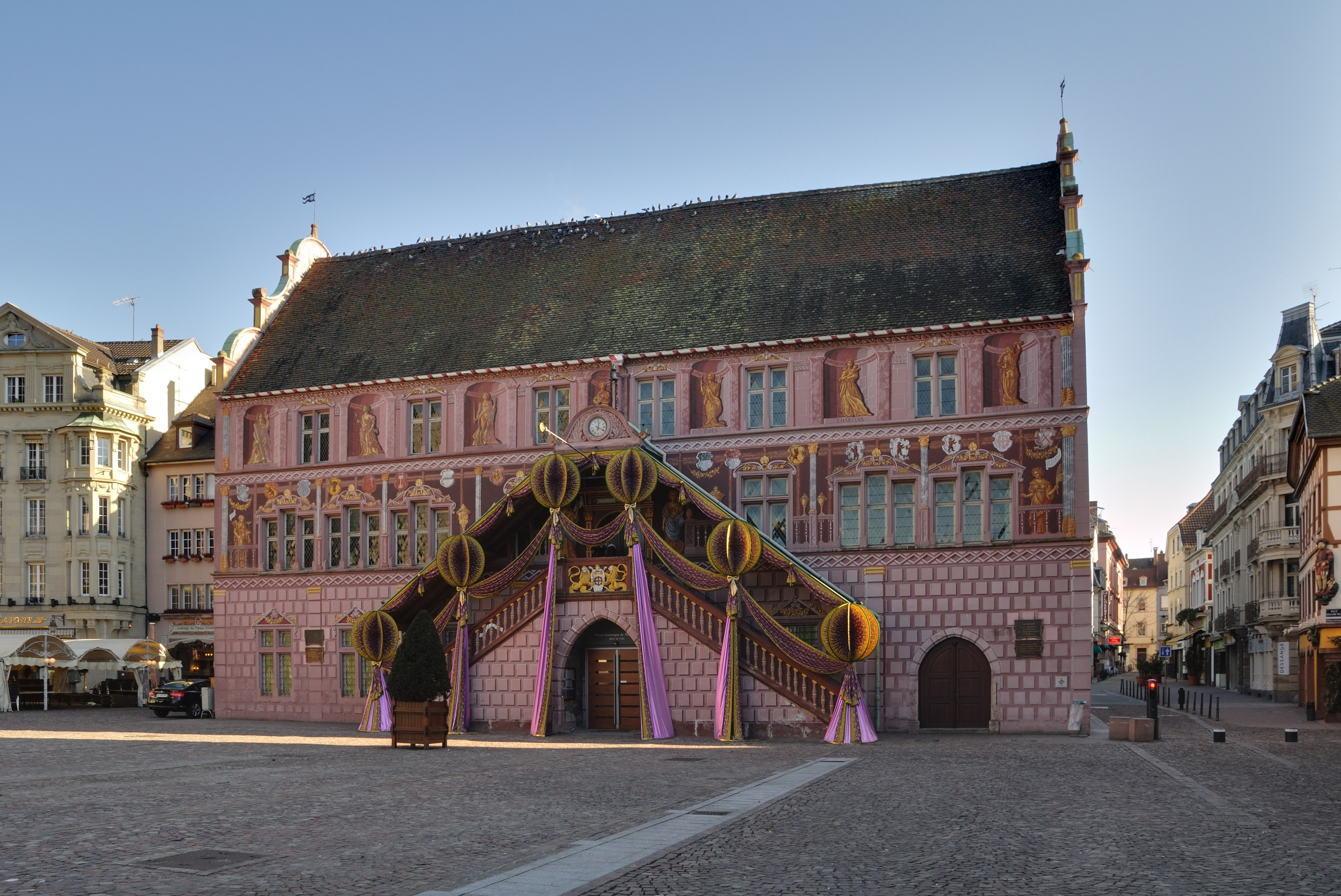
Mulhouse town hall

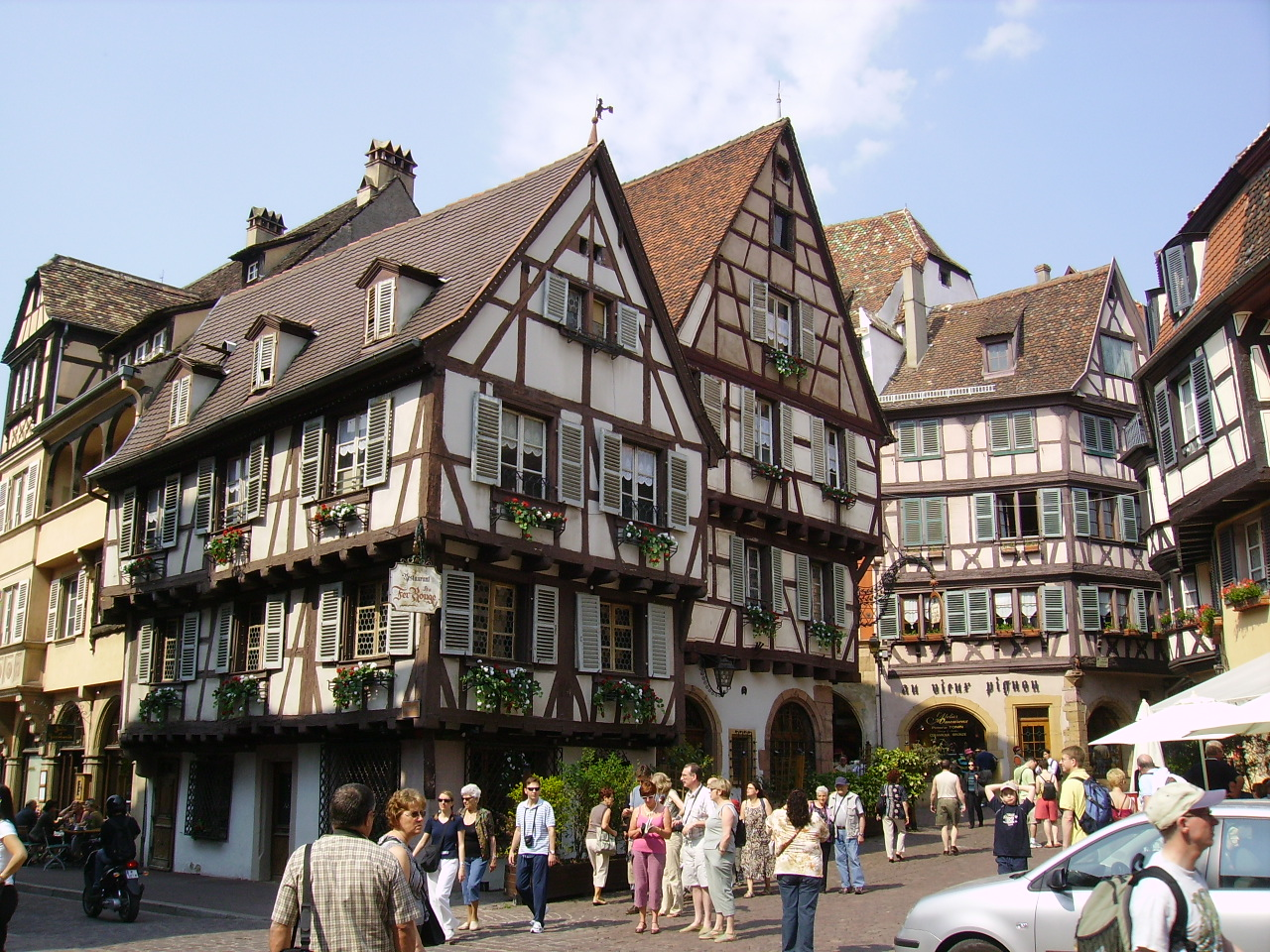
Colmar

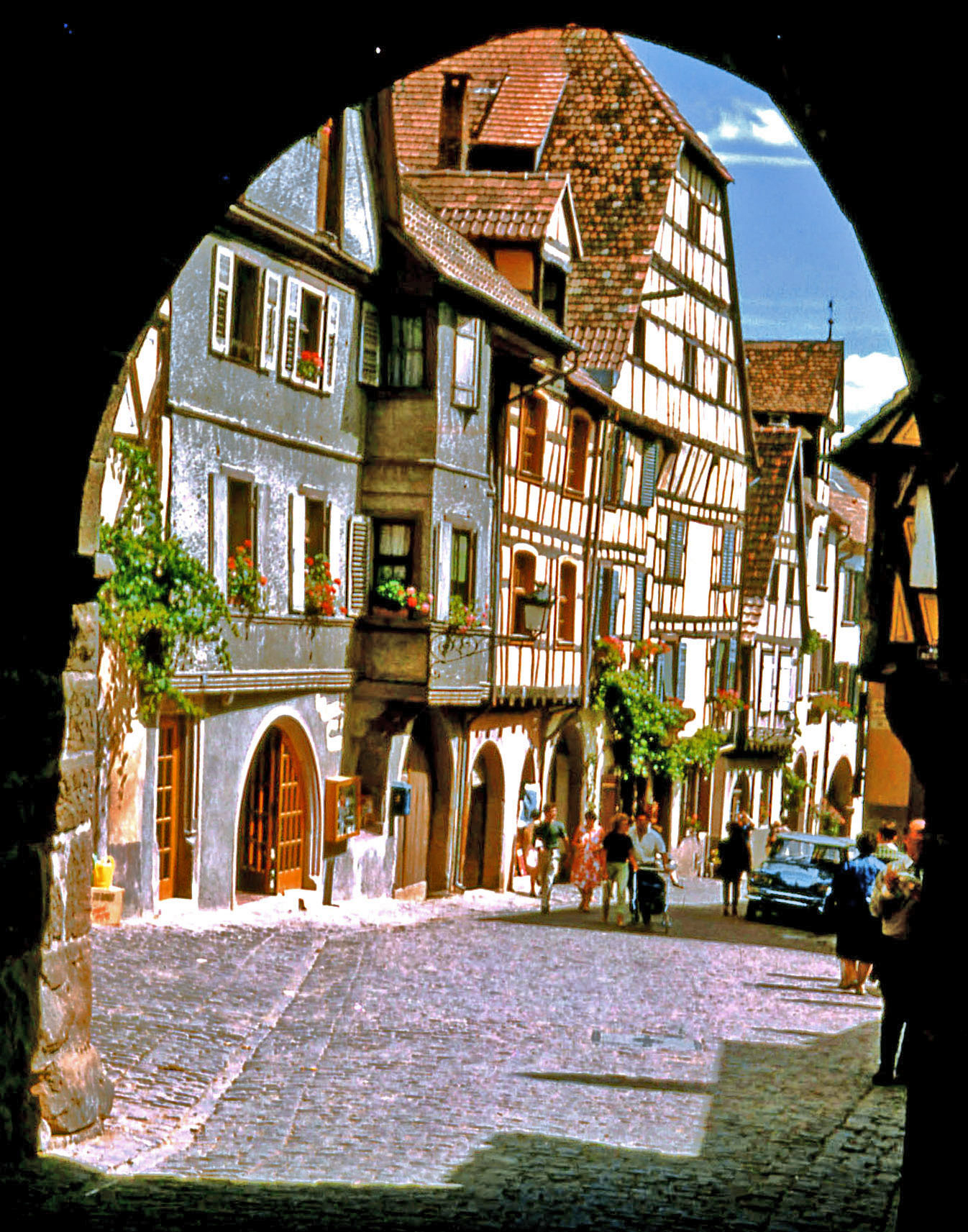
Riquewihr

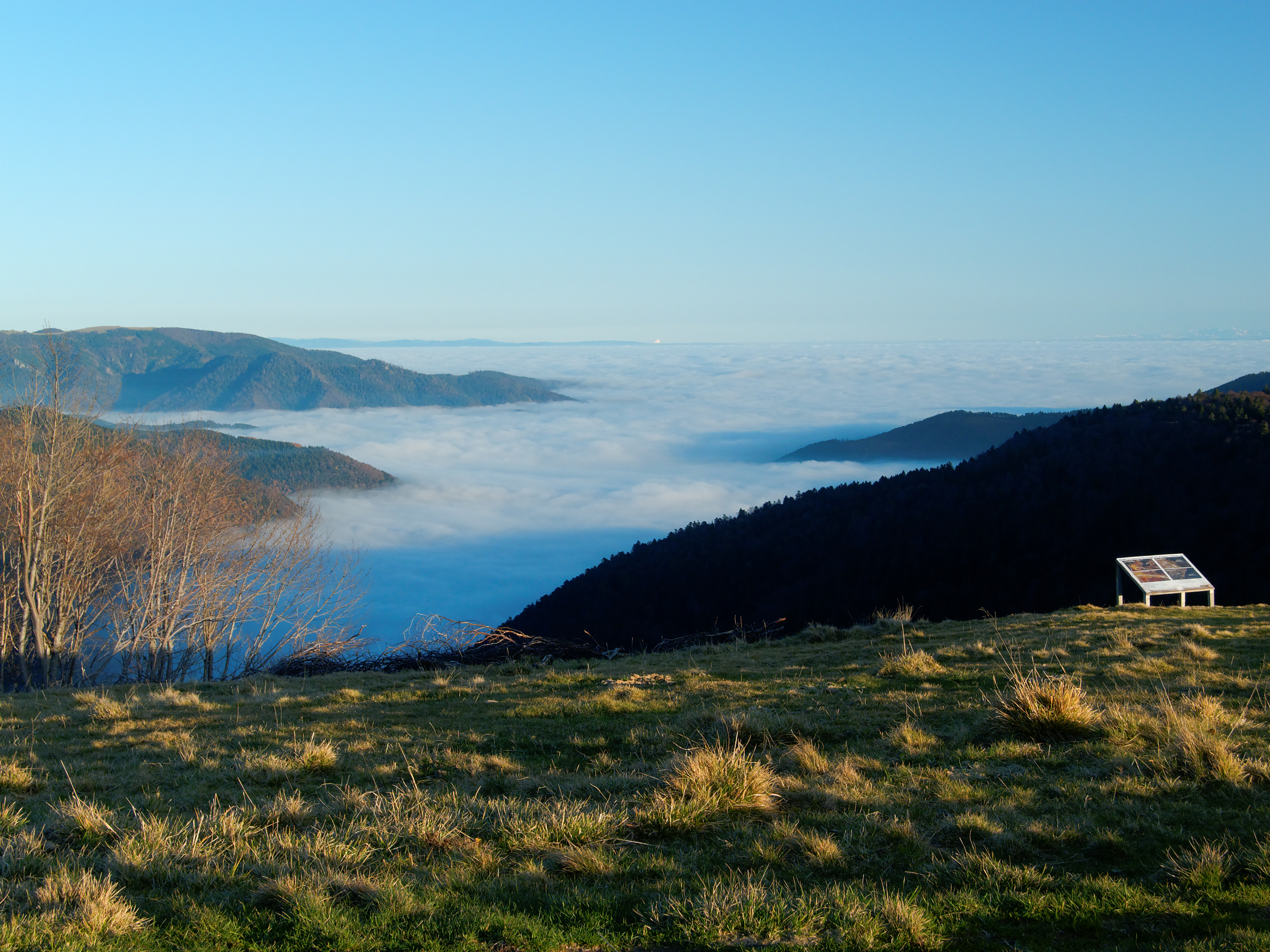
View from the Ballon d'Alsace

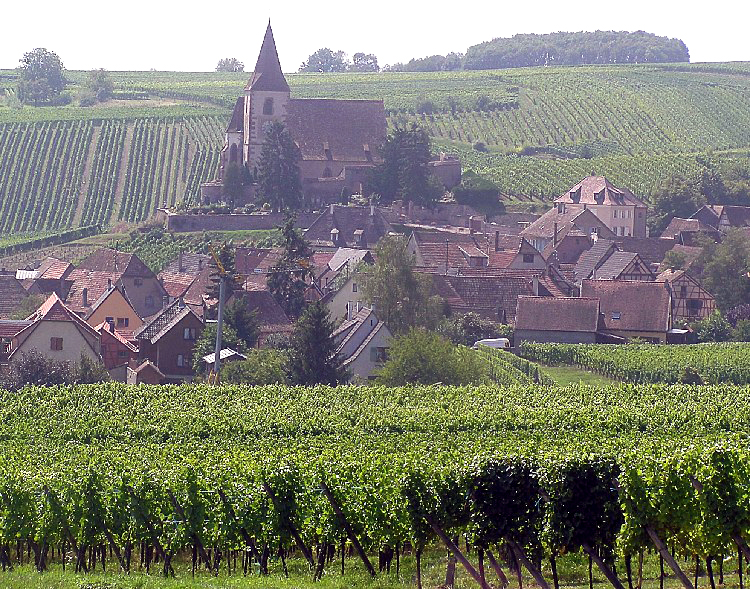
Hunawihr and Alsatian vineyards

== Transport ==
The department's main airport is served by EuroAirport Basel Mulhouse Freiburg located in Saint-Louis, it provides air travel for the department as well as Basel-Stadt in the nearby border of Switzerland and Freiburg im Breisgau in Germany. Strasbourg Airport is another alternative airport that the department also uses, it is located 109 km (68 mi) north of Mulhouse.

== Culture ==
- Alsatian language

== See also ==
- Cantons of the Haut-Rhin department
- Communes of the Haut-Rhin department
- Arrondissements of the Haut-Rhin department
