= List of ordained Christian women =

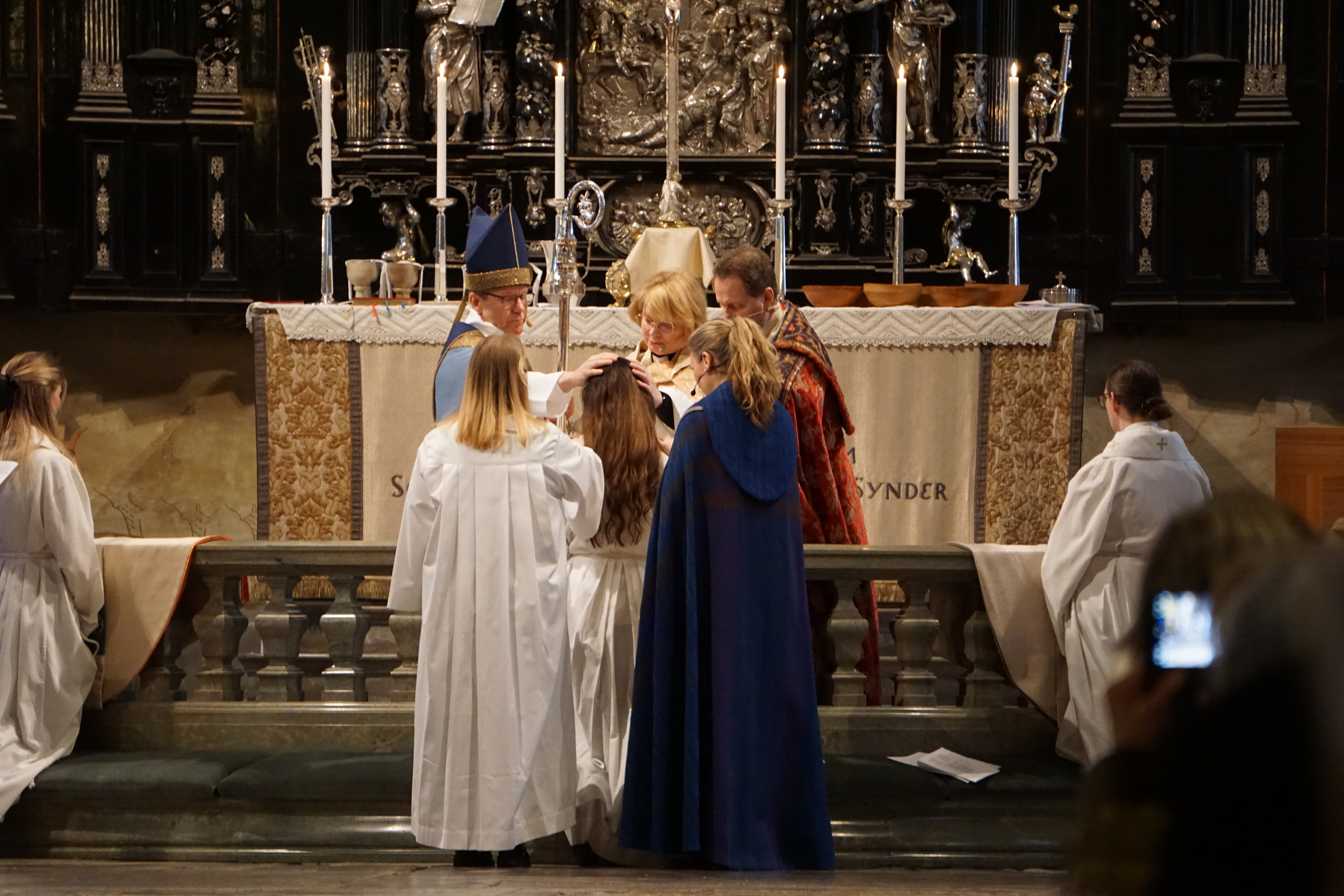
Evangelical-Lutheran ordination of a female priest to holy orders by the bishop in the Cathedral Church of Saint Nicholas, part of the Church of Sweden (2025)

In many denominations of Christianity the ordination of women is a relatively recent phenomenon within the life of the Church. As opportunities for women have expanded in the last 50 years, those ordained women who broke new ground or took on roles not traditionally held by women in the Church have been and continue to be considered notable. This list includes ordained ministers, bishops and other church leaders who have made an impact on their Christian denomination, or have been recognized as pathbreakers. Due to historical differences deaconesses will not be included. In Presbyterianism, Methodism and a few other denominations the ordination of women predates 1900 and is now common enough to be unremarkable. Therefore, most ordained women clergy in these denominations are not included. Where women are making ground-breaking strides in those denominations, some individuals are included.

== African Methodist Episcopal Church ==
- Carrie T. Hooper – first woman to run for election as bishop in AME Church
- Vashti Murphy McKenzie – first woman elected bishop in the African Methodist Episcopal Church

== Anglicanism ==
- Nerva Cot Aguilera – first woman bishop in the Episcopal Church of Cuba, and within the Anglican communion in all of Latin America, and first woman bishop in the Caribbean
- Joyce M. Bennett – first English woman to be ordained a priest in the Anglican Communion
- Mariann Budde – American Episcopal bishop (born 1959)
- Miriam Byrne – provost in the Scottish Episcopal Church
- Eleanor Clitheroe-Bell – priest and former businesswoman
- Barbara Clementine Harris – first woman consecrated as bishop in the Episcopal Church USA, and in the Anglican communion
- Griselda Delgado del Carpio – first woman to become a diocesan bishop in the Episcopal Church of Cuba
- Kay Goldsworthy – installed as Archbishop of Perth in 2018, first woman Archbishop in the Anglican Church of Australia
- Jane Hwang – along with Joyce M. Bennett, first regularly ordained Anglican priests in Hong Kong
- Penny Jamieson – first woman to become a bishop in the Anglican Church in Aotearoa, New Zealand and Polynesia; first woman to become a diocesan bishop in the Anglican Communion.
- Florence Li Tim-Oi – first woman ordained as an Anglican priest
- Molly McGreevy – former soap opera actress, ordained priest in the Episcopal Church
- Katharine Jefferts Schori – first woman to become primate of an Anglican church
- Libby Lane – first woman to become a bishop in the Church of England
- Rachel Treweek – first woman to become a diocesan bishop in the Church of England
- Dame Sarah Mullally – suffragan bishop in the Church of England, since January 2026 she is 106th Archbishop of Canterbury; announced on 3 October 2025, making her the first woman to be appointed to lead the Church of England in that role.
- Victoria Matthews – first woman to become a bishop in the Anglican Church of Canada; first woman to become a diocesan bishop; first woman to be translated from one diocese (Toronto) to another (Christchurch, New Zealand)
- Pat Storey – first woman to become a diocesan bishop in the Church of Ireland
- Ellinah Wamukoya – first woman to become a diocesan bishop in the Anglican Church of Southern Africa
- Sarah Macneil – first woman to become a diocesan bishop in the Anglican Church of Australia
- Pushpa Lalitha – first woman to become a diocesan bishop in the Church of South India
- June Osborne – first woman to become bishop in the Church in Wales
- Joanna Penberthy – second woman to become bishop in the Church in Wales
- Anne Dyer – first woman to become bishop in the Scottish Episcopal Church

== Baptist ==
- Regina Claas in Germany de:Bund Evangelisch-Freikirchlicher Gemeinden

== Catholic ==
Ludmila Javorová – made public in 1995 her claim to have been ordained in 1970 during Communist rule in Czechoslovakia. The ordination of Javorová, although officiated by a bishop in communion with the Pope, was declared to be invalid.

Several Catholic groups not in communion with the Pope allow women to be ordained.

- Christine Mayr-Lumetzberger – excommunicated for unlawful ordination
- Sinéad O'Connor – excommunicated for ordination by Independent Catholic Michael Cox
- Mary Ramerman – one of the founders of Spiritus Christi

== Lutheranism ==
- Elizabeth Platz – first woman ordained in Lutheran Church in America, American Lutheranism
- Margot Käßmann – bishop in Evangelical-Lutheran Church of Hanover, German Lutheranism (1999–2010)
- Maria Jepsen – bishop in North Elbian Evangelical Lutheran Church – first woman to become a Lutheran bishop worldwide Germany (1991–2010)
- Bärbel Wartenberg-Potter – bishop in North Elbian Evangelical Lutheran Church, Germany (2001–2008)
- Susanne Breit-Keßler – bishop in Germany
- Rosemarie Köhn – bishop in Church of Norway (1993–2006)
- Lise-Lotte Rebel – bishop in Church of Denmark (since 1995)
- Christina Odenberg – bishop in Church of Sweden — (1996–2007)
- Marie Jerge - bishop in Evangelical Lutheran Church in America (2002-)
- Irja Askola – bishop in Evangelical Lutheran Church of Finland (since 2010)
- Marianne Christiansen – bishop in Church of Denmark (since 2013)
- Antje Jackelén – bishop in Church of Sweden (since 2007)
- Eva Brunne – bishop in Church of Sweden (since 2009)
- Sofie Petersen – bishop in Greenland of Church of Denmark (since 1995)
- Ingeborg Midttømme – bishop in Church of Norway (since 2008)
- Elizabeth Eaton – bishop in Evangelical Lutheran Church in America (since 2013)
- Solveig Fiske – bishop in Church of Norway (since 2006)
- Helga Haugland Byfuglien – bishop in Church of Norway (since 2005)
- Susan Johnson – bishop in Evangelical Lutheran Church in Canada (since 2007)
- Tuulikki Koivunen Bylund – bishop in Church of Sweden (since 2009)
- Wilma Kucharek – bishop in Slovak Zion Synod (since 2002)
- Caroline Krook – bishop in Church of Sweden (since 1998)
- Laila Riksaasen Dahl – bishop in Church of Norway (since 2002)
- Agnes M. Sigurðardóttir – bishop in Church of Iceland (since 2012)
- Kirsten Fehrs – bishop in Evangelical Lutheran Church in Northern Germany (since 2011)
- Tine Lindhardt – bishop in Church of Denmark (since 2012)
- Ann Svennungsen - bishop in Evangelical Lutheran Church in America (2012-2024)
- Regina Hassanally - bishop in Evangelical Lutheran Church in America (since 2019)
- Kristina Kühnbaum-Schmidt – bishop in Evangelical Lutheran Church in Northern Germany (since 2019)
- Paneeraq Siegstad Munk - bishop in Church of Denmark, Greenland (since 2020)
- Katrina Foster - bishop in Evangelical Lutheran Church in America (since 2025), United States
- Christina-Maria Bammel - bishop in Evangelical Lutheran Church in Brunswick, Germany (since 2026)

== Methodist ==
- Rosemarie Wenner – bishop in Germany
- Minerva G. Carcaño – bishop in the United States
- Judith Craig – bishop in the United States
- Violet L. Fisher – bishop in the United States
- Carolyn Tyler Guidry – bishop in the United States
- Janice Riggle Huie – bishop in the United States
- Leontine T. Kelly – bishop in the United States
- Marjorie Matthews – bishop in the United States
- Mary Ann Swenson – bishop in the United States
- Mary Virginia Taylor – bishop in the United States
- Karen Oliveto – bishop in the United States

== Old Catholic ==
- Maria Kubin – bishop in Austria

== Pentecostal ==
- María Luisa Piraquive – Church of God Ministry of Jesus Christ International
- Aimee Semple McPherson – Founder of Foursquare International Church
- Maria Woodworth-Etter – Ordained Assemblies of God Holiness and Pentecostal Pastor and Evangelist
- Ida Robinson – Founder of Mount Sinai Holy Church of America
- Mary Magdalena Lewis Tate – Founder of Church of the Living God
- Florence L. Crawford – Founder of Apostolic Faith Mission (Brooklyn)
- Rosa Horn – Founder of Mt Calvary Pentecostal Church of All Nations
- Michel Girtman-White (1949–2020) – Founder of The Cathedral at Greater Faith and Former Assistant Presiding Bishop of the Churches of the Living

== Presbyterian ==
- Mary Levison – first woman to become a minister in the Church of Scotland
- Sheilagh Kesting – minister in the Church of Scotland
- Lorna Hood – minister in the Church of Scotland
- Margaret Towner – first woman to be ordained a minister of the United Presbyterian Church in the United States of America (UPCUSA) (1956)
- Rachel Henderlite – first woman to be ordained a pastor of the Presbyterian Church in the United States (PCUS) (1965)
- Katie Geneva Cannon – first African American woman ordained a minister in United Presbyterian Church in the United States of America (UPCUSA) (1974)
- Rebecca Reyes) – first Hispanic/Latina woman ordained a minister in the Presbyterian Church in the United States (PCUS) (1979)
- Elizabeth Kwon – transferred her ordination from Japan in 1979 and became the first female Korean-American minister in the United Presbyterian Church in the United States of America (UPCUSA) (1979)
- Holly Haile Smith Davis – first Native American woman ordained as a teaching elder in the Presbyterian Church, ordained in the Presbyterian Church (U.S.A.) (PCUSA) (1987)

== Reformed ==
- Susanne Bei der Wieden – Evangelical Reformed Church in Germany

== United and Uniting churches ==
- Brigitte Boehme – Evangelical Church of Bremen (2001–2013)
- Edda Bosse – Evangelical Church of Bremen (since 2013)
- Trijnie Bouw – Protestant Church in the Netherlands (since June 2024)
- Dosia Carlson – United Church of Christ minister and hymnwriter
- Yvonne V. Delk- first African-American woman ordained in the United Church of Christ
- Yvette Flunder – minister in United Church of Christ
- Beate Hofmann – Evangelical Church of Hesse Electorate-Waldeck (since 2019)
- Ilse Junkermann – bishop in Evangelical Church in Central Germany (2009–2019)
- Annette Kurschus – bishop (präses) in Evangelical Church of Westphalia (2012–2025)
- Adelheid Ruck-Schröder – bishop (präses) in Evangelical Church of Westphalia (since 2025)
- Madge Saunders – first woman in the United Church in Jamaica and the Cayman Islands to serve as a parish priest (1975)
- Heike Springhart – bishop in Protestant Church in Baden (since 2022)
- Christiane Tietz – bishop (Kirchenpresident) in Protestant Church in Hesse and Nassau
- Adlyn White – first woman ordained by the United Church in Jamaica and the Cayman Islands (1973); first woman to head the church (1991)
- Lois Miriam Wilson – first woman moderator of the United Church of Canada
- Dorothee Wüst – Church president of the Evangelical Church of the Palatinate (since 2021)

== See also ==
- Episcopa
- List of the first women ordained as priests in the Anglican Church of Australia in 1992
- List of women bishops in the Anglican Church of Australia
- Ordination of women in the Anglican Communion
- List of the first women ordained as priests in the Church of England in 1994
- Ordination of women in Methodism
- Ordination of women in Christianity
- Timeline of women's ordination
- Ordination of women and the Catholic Church
- Ordination of women in the Church of Scotland
