= Ordination of women in Christianity =

Ordination of women to holy orders

In Christianity, the ordination of women has been taking place in an increasing number of Protestant and Old Catholic churches, a trend that has accelerated in the 20th century to the present day. Since ancient times, certain churches of the Orthodox tradition, such as the Coptic Orthodox Church, have raised women to the office of deaconess. Within Protestantism, accounts of female preachers go back to at least the time of the English Dissenters, and regular ordination of women presbyters has been commonplace in the Holiness movement tradition since the 19th century. While ordination of women has now been approved in many denominations, it is a very controversial and divisive topic.

Ordination is the process by which people are consecrated by a Christian denomination, that is, set apart as clergy to perform various religious rites and ceremonies such as celebrating the sacraments. The process and ceremonies of ordination varies by denomination. One who is in preparation for, or who is undergoing the process of ordination is sometimes called an ordinand. The liturgy used at an ordination is sometimes referred to as an ordinal.

== Overview of the theological debate ==
Most (although not all) Protestant denominations ordain church leaders who have the task of equipping all believers in their Christian service (Ephesians 4:11–13). These leaders (variously styled elders, pastors, or ministers) are seen to have a distinct role in teaching, pastoral leadership.

Protestant churches have historically viewed the Bible as the ultimate authority in church debates (the doctrine of sola scriptura); as such, the debate over women's eligibility for such offices normally centers around the interpretation of certain Biblical passages relating to teaching and leadership roles. The main passages in this debate include 1 Cor. 11:2–16, 1 Cor. 14:34–35 and 1 Tim. 2:11–14, 1 Tim. 3:1–7, and Tit. 1:5–9.

Increasingly however, supporters of women in ministry argue that the Biblical passages used to argue against women's ordination might be read differently when more understanding of the unique historical context of each passage is available. They further argue that the New Testament shows that women did exercise certain ministries in the apostolic Church (e.g., Acts 21:9, Acts 18:18, Romans 16:1–4, Romans 16:7; 1 Cor. 16:19, Philippians 4:2–3, and John 20:1–18. Often quoting Galatians 3:28, they argue that the good news brought by Jesus has broken down all barriers and that female ordination is an equality issue that Jesus would have approved of. They also quote John 20:17–18, and argue that in talking to Mary, Jesus is calling for women to evangelize.

In turn, those who argue for a male only ministry say that the claims to contexts that change the apparent meaning of the texts at hand to one supporting female ordination are in fact spurious, that the passages that appear to show women in positions of authority do not in fact do so, and the idea that the good news of Jesus brings equality before God only relates to salvation and not to roles for ministry.

Catholics claim that, while all Christians have the right to receive the sacraments, there is no right to ordination. They further claim that the sacraments work ex opere operato, as manifestations of Jesus' actions and words during his life, and that Holy Orders is the manifestation of Jesus' calling of the twelve apostles. As a result, Catholics argue that women and transgender men cannot be ordained.

== By tradition ==
=== Anabaptist ===
Brethren

- The Church of the Brethren has ordained women since 1958.

==== Mennonite ====
- The Canadian Conference of Mennonite Brethren Churches' has ordained women.
- The Mennonite Church Canada ordains women.
- The Mennonite Brethren Church of Canada ordains some women, as determined by their local church communities.
- The US Conference of Mennonite Brethren Churches will license women but not ordain them.
- The Mennonite Church USA ordains women.
- The Brethren in Christ Church ordains women at all levels of leadership, including Bishop.
- The Mennonite Church of Congo, or CMCo ordains women since 2013, being also part of the bigger Church of Christ in the Congo or CCC.

1

=== Anglican ===
The ordination of women in the Anglican Communion has been increasingly common in certain provinces since the 1970s. However, several provinces (such as the Church of Pakistan—a united Protestant Church created as a result of a union between Anglicans, Lutherans, Methodists and Presbyterians) and certain dioceses within otherwise ordaining provinces (such as the Diocese of Sydney in the Anglican Church of Australia), continue to ordain only men. Disputes over the ordination of women have contributed to the establishment and growth of conservative separatist tendencies, such the Anglican realignment and Continuing Anglican movements.

Some provinces within the Anglican Communion, such as the Protestant Episcopal Church in the United States of America, ordain women to the three traditional holy orders of bishop, priest and deacon. Other provinces ordain women as deacons and priests but not as bishops; others still as deacons only; and seven provinces do not approve the ordination of women to any order of ministry. Sarah Mullally became Primate of the Church in England on 1 January 2026.

=== Baptist ===
Baptist groups that do not support the ordination of women include:

- The Southern Baptist Convention (the largest of the various Baptist denominations) does not support the ordination of women; however, some churches that are members of the SBC have ordained women. Though each SBC church is autonomous and may choose whether or not to ordain women, the local associations, state conventions, and national convention have the right to not seat messengers from those churches at the annual meetings.
- General Association of Regular Baptist Churches Not to be confused with General Association of Baptists).
- American Baptist Association (Not to be confused with American Baptist Churches USA).
- Baptist Bible Fellowship International
- Independent Baptist Fellowship of North America
- Baptist Christian Church of the Republic of Poland

Baptist groups that ordain women include;

- United States : American Baptist Churches USA, Alliance of Baptists, Cooperative Baptist Fellowship, National Baptist Convention, USA, Inc., Progressive National Baptist Convention, and Converge
- The Baptist Union of Great Britain since 1922
- The Canadian Baptist Ministries since 1947
- The Australian Baptist Ministries since 1978
- The Convention of Philippine Baptist Churches since 1980
- The Union of Evangelical Free Churches in Germany since 1992.
- The Okinawa Baptist Convention, Japan
- The Baptist Union of Scotland since 1999.

=== Catholic ===
In the Catholic Church women are not ordained to any clerical position. The independent organization Roman Catholic Womenpriests aims to try to reverse this policy.

=== Lutheran ===
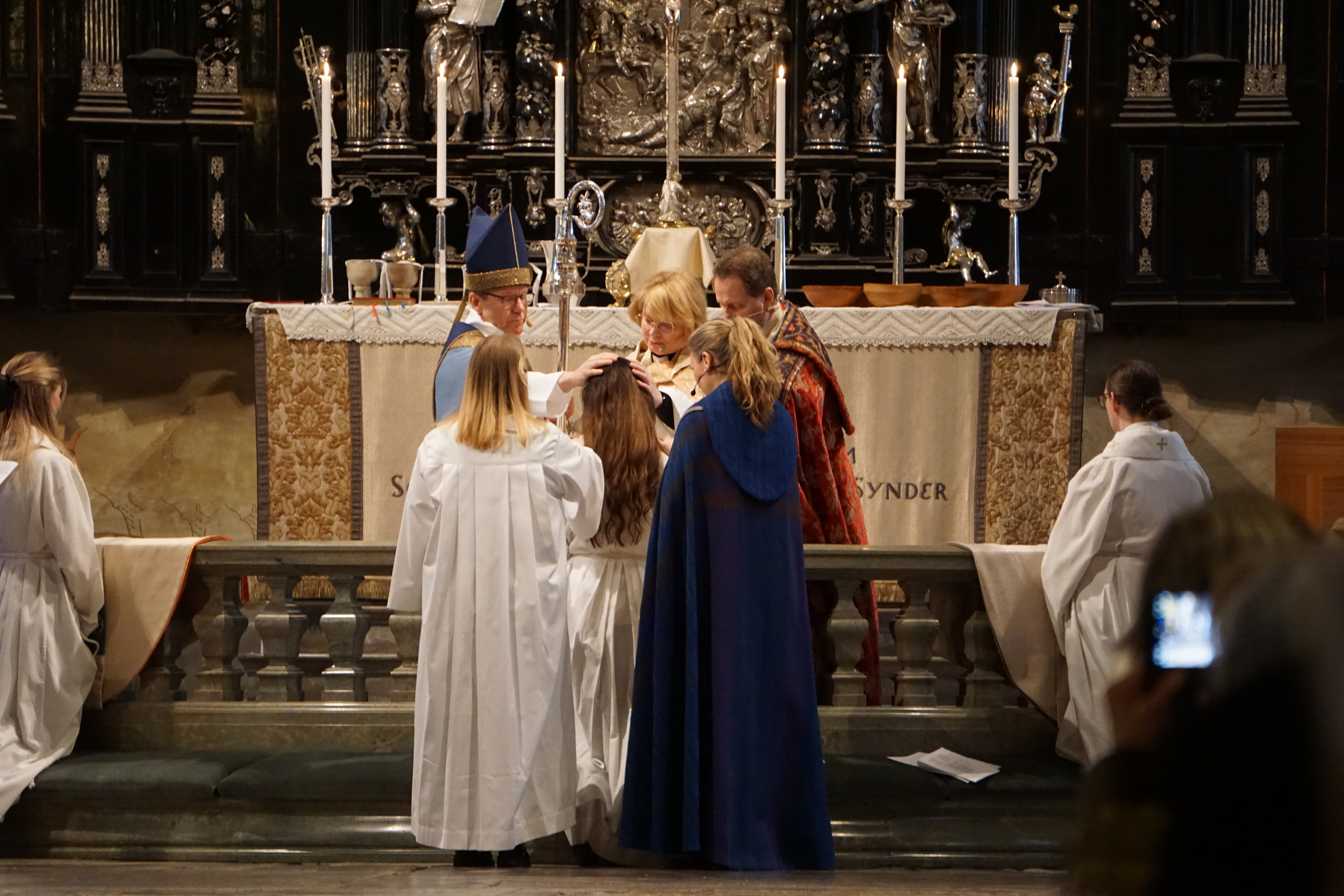
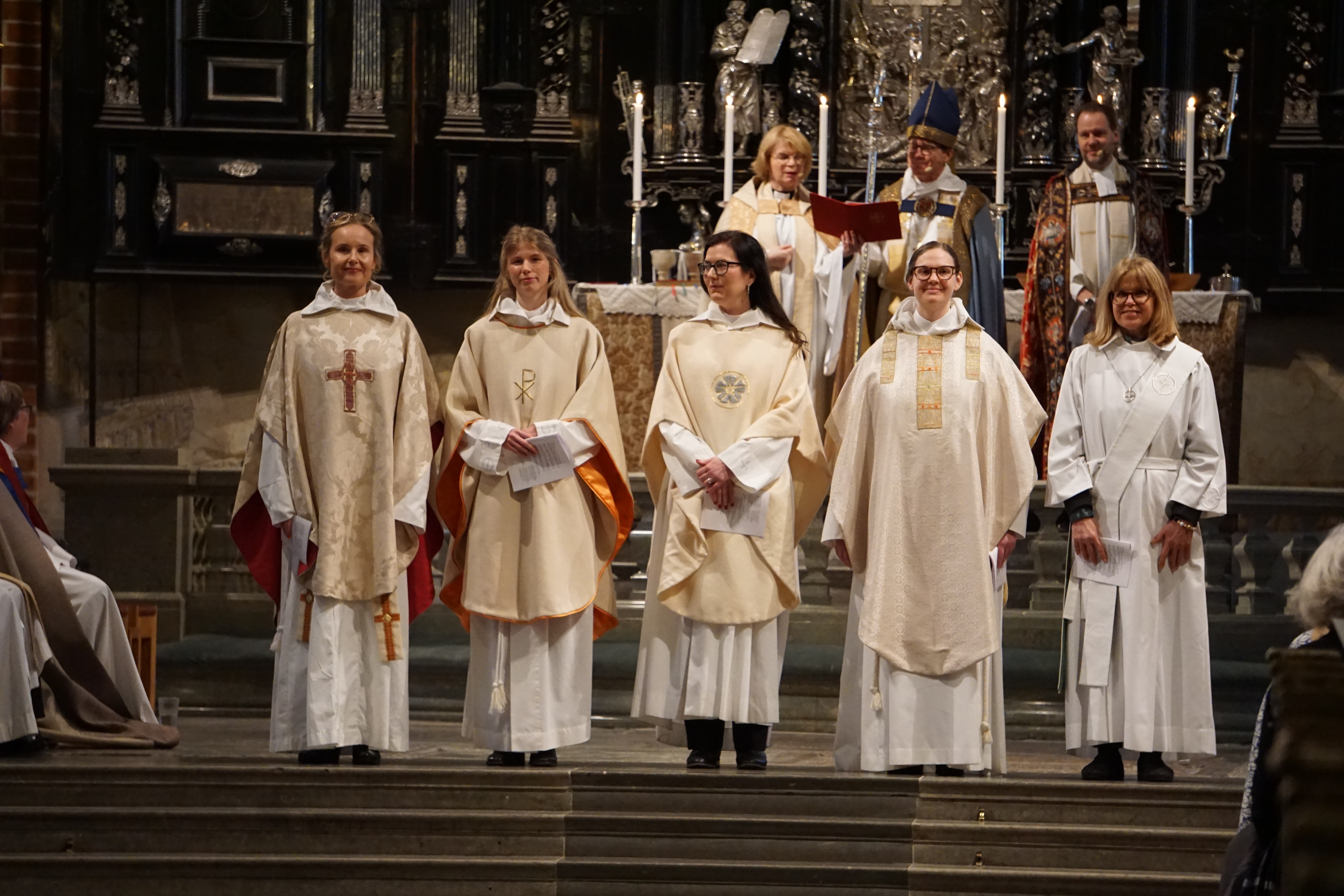
An Evangelical-Lutheran ordination Mass in which women were ordained to the priesthood by the bishop in the Cathedral Church of Saint Nicholas, part of the Church of Sweden (2025)

==== Europe ====
- The Lutheran churches within the Evangelical Church in Germany (EKD) ordain women and have women as bishops.
- The Independent Evangelical-Lutheran Church in Germany does not ordain women.
- The Evangelical Lutheran Church of Latvia reversed its earlier (1975) decision to ordain women as pastors. Since 1993 it no longer does so in practice. Since 2016 this principle has been affirmed in its constitution.
- The Lutheran state churches in the Nordic countries ordain women as pastors and have women as bishops. The first female pastors were ordained in the Church of Denmark in 1948, in Sweden in 1960, Norway in 1961, in Iceland in 1974 and in Finland in 1988.
  - While the Church of Sweden ordained its first female pastors in 1960, there was a considerable debate in this church of the ordination of women, which led to marginalization of a vocal high-church minority, which successively subdivided into loyalist high-church adherents on one hand and the splinter group Missionsprovinsen which was formed in 2003 but in 2005 was separated as a church body from the Church of Sweden.
  - Although the ordination of women was accepted by the Church of Finland in 1988, controversy over the issue occasionally surfaces among the more conservative wing of the church. Occasional debate on the matter has caused church membership resignations.
- The Estonian Evangelical Lutheran Church (EELC) began to ordain women in 1967 and 2004 all obstacles that forbade women to be consecrated as bishops were removed although none have yet been consecrated.
- The Evangelical Church of the Augsburg Confession in Poland ordains women as pastors since 2022. 9 pastors are women.
- The Evangelical Church of the Augsburg Confession in Slovakia ordains women as pastors since 1951 and women can be elected bishops.
- The Slovak Evangelical Church of the Augsburg Confession in Serbia ordains women as pastors. Out of 20 pastors in Serbia, 6 are women.

==== United States ====
- The Evangelical Lutheran Church in America (ELCA) is the largest Lutheran body in the US. The church bodies that formed the ELCA in 1988 began ordaining women in 1970 when the Lutheran Church in America ordained Elizabeth Platz. In 2017 about 27% of the rostered leaders were women and about 50% of the seminarians preparing for ministry were women. In 2013 the first female presiding bishop of the ELCA, Elizabeth Eaton, was elected. In 2018 16 of the 65 synodical bishops (17 bishops including Presiding Bishop Eaton) in the ELCA were women
- The General Lutheran Church ordains women.
- The Lutheran Church–Missouri Synod (LCMS), which is the second largest Lutheran body in the United States, does not ordain women.
- The Lutheran Congregations in Mission for Christ (LCMC) also allows for the ordination of women.
- The North American Lutheran Church, was founded in 2010 does ordain women. The NALC has established ecumenical dialog with a number of Lutheran bodies, both those that ordain women and those that do not.
- The Wisconsin Evangelical Lutheran Synod does not ordain women.
- The Evangelical Lutheran Synod does not ordain women.
- The Church of the Lutheran Confession does not ordain women.
- The Lutheran Evangelical Protestant Church (GCEPC) has ordained women since its inception in 2000. Ordination of women is not a controversial issue in the LEPC/GCEPC. Women are ordained/consecrated at all levels, including deacon, priest, and bishop in the LEPC/GCEPC.

==== Africa ====
- The Evangelical Lutheran Church in Tanzania (ELCT) decided to ordain women in 1990, but does not have any women bishops. Some dioceses are still opposed to the ordination of women.
- The Ethiopian Evangelical Church Mekane Yesus (EECMY) began to ordain women in 2000 but does not continue this practice since confessional Lutheranism has become stronger in this church body during recent years.

==== Australia/Oceania ====
- The Lutheran Church of Australia endorses the ordination of women.

=== Methodist ===
- The United Methodist Church ordains women. In 1880, Anna Howard Shaw was ordained by the Methodist Protestant Church; Ella Niswonger was ordained in 1889 by the United Brethren Church. Both denominations later merged into the United Methodist Church. In 1956, the Methodist Church in America granted ordination and full clergy rights to women. Since that time, women have been ordained full elders (pastors) in the denomination, and 21 have been elevated to the episcopacy. In 1967 Noemi Diaz is the first Hispanic woman ordained by an Annual Conference. The New York Annual Conference did the honors. The first woman elected and consecrated Bishop within the United Methodist Church (and, indeed, the first woman elected bishop of any mainline Christian church) was Marjorie Matthews in 1980. Leontine T. Kelly, in 1984, was the first African-American woman elevated to the episcopacy in any mainline denomination. In Germany Rosemarie Wenner is since 2005 leading bishop in the United Methodist Church. Bishop Karen Oliveto, currently serving, is the first openly lesbian bishop in The United Methodist Church.
- The Primitive Methodist Church does not ordain women as elders nor does it license them as pastors or local preachers; the PMC does consecrate women as deaconesses.
- The Evangelical Wesleyan Church (EWC) does not ordain women as elders although it does commission women as deaconesses.
- The Fundamental Methodist Conference does not ordain women.
- The Southern Methodist Church does not ordain women.
- The Free Methodist Church has ordained women since 1911.
- The Bible Methodist Connection of Churches ordains women.
- The Salvation Army ordains women and has done since its inception. Catherine Booth was co-founder, with her husband William.
- The Church of the Nazarene ordains women, with the first women being ordained since 1908.
- The Wesleyan Methodist Church (which is now the Allegheny Wesleyan Methodist Connection and Wesleyan Church) has ordained women as ministers since near its inception, and claims to be one of the first to ordain women in the modern era.

=== Old Catholic ===
Many Old Catholic denominations ordain women to the episcopate and to the presbyterate, such as the Old Catholic Churches International. In 2023, Maria Kubin became bishop of Old Catholic Church of Austria in Austria. The Polish National Catholic Church does not ordain women.

=== Orthodox Churches ===
In the Eastern Orthodox Church, women have been ordained as deaconesses, but not as bishops or priests.

=== Pentecostal ===
Pentecostal groups that do not support the ordination of women include:

- The Indian Pentecostal Church of God does not ordain women pastors.
- The Pentecostal Mission does not ordain women pastors.
- Church of God in Christ (COGIC) does not ordain women as elder or bishop

Pentecostal groups that ordain women include:

- The Federation of Pentecostal Churches (Germany)
- The Assemblies of God USA, 1927
- The Foursquare Church, 1975
- The Pentecostal Alliance of Independent Churches allows ordination of women.
- The occurrence of women pastors, often as co-pastors along with their husbands, is frequent in the Pentecostal movement especially in churches not affiliated with a denomination; they may or may not be ordained.

=== Presbyterian, United or Reformed ===
==== Scotland ====
- The Church of Scotland

- Women were commissioned as deacons from 1935, and allowed to preach from 1949.
- In 1967 Margaret Forrester, Claude Barbour, Elizabeth Hewat, Mary Levison, Mary Weir, and Sheila White petitioned the General Assembly for ordination.
- Woman elders were introduced in 1966 and women ministers in 1968.
- The first female Moderator of the General Assembly was Dr Alison Elliot in 2004.

- The United Free Church of Scotland has ordained women since 1929 and elected its first female general assembly moderator in 1960.
- The Free Church of Scotland does not ordain women.
- The Free Church of Scotland (Continuing) does not ordain women.
- The Free Presbyterian Church of Scotland based in Scotland, Australia, and Zimbabwe does not ordain women.
- The Associated Presbyterian Churches based in Scotland does not ordain women.

==== England/Wales ====
- The United Reformed Church in the United Kingdom ordains women.
- The International Presbyterian Church based in the UK, Europe, and Korea does not ordain women.
- The Evangelical Presbyterian Church in England and Wales does not ordain women.
- The Free Church of England does not ordain women.
- The Presbyterian Church of Wales ordains women.

==== Ireland ====
- The Presbyterian Church in Ireland ordains women.
- The Non-subscribing Presbyterian Church of Ireland ordains women.
- The Free Presbyterian Church of Ulster does not ordain women.
- The Evangelical Presbyterian Church (Ireland) does not ordain women.
- The Reformed Presbyterian Church of Ireland does not ordain women.

==== Netherlands ====
- The Dutch Reformed Church ordains women except the reformed union.
- The Reformed Churches in the Netherlands (Liberated) does not ordain women.
- The Reformed Congregations in the Netherlands does not ordain women.

==== Belgium ====
- The United Protestant Church in Belgium ordains women.

==== Luxembourg ====
- The Protestant Reformed Church of Luxembourg ordains women.
- The Protestant Church of Luxembourg ordains women.

==== France ====
- The Reformed Church of France ordains women.
- The United Protestant Church of France ordains women.

==== Switzerland ====
- The Swiss Reformed Church ordains women.

==== Germany ====
- The United and Reformed churches within the Evangelical Church in Germany (EKD) ordain women and have women as bishops.

==== Eastern Europe ====
- The Reformed Church in Hungary ordains women.
- The Polish Reformed Church has ordained women since 2003.

==== North America ====
- The National Presbyterian Church in Mexico, which is the largest Presbyterian church in all of the Americas with 2.8 million members, does not ordain women.
- The Presbyterian Church (USA). The PC(USA) was formed in 1983 by a merger of the southern Presbyterian Church in the United States (PCUS) and the northern United Presbyterian Church in the United States of America (UPCUSA). The PC(USA) has always ordained women. With regards to its predecessor bodies - in 1893, Edith Livingston Peake was appointed Presbyterian Evangelist by First United Presbyterian of San Francisco. Between 1907 and 1920 five more women became ministers. The Presbyterian Church (USA) began ordaining women as elders in 1930, and as ministers of Word and sacrament in 1956. By 2001, the numbers of men and women holding office were almost equal. The first woman to be ordained in the Presbyterian Church in the United States was Rev. Rachel Henderlite who was ordained by a predominantly African American congregation in Richmond, Virginia, in 1965.
- The Presbyterian Church in America does not ordain women. In 1997, the PCA even broke its fraternal relationship with the Christian Reformed Church over this issue.
- The Reformed Church in the United States does not ordain women.
- The Evangelical & Reformed Synod ordain only men as deacons, presbyters, and bishops.
- The Free Reformed Churches of North America ordain men only.
- The Cumberland Presbyterian Church. In 1888 Louisa Woosley was licensed to preach. She was ordained in 1889. She wrote Shall Woman Preach.
- The Christian Reformed Church in North America began ordaining women in 1995. As a result, several conservative congregations formed the United Reformed Churches in North America, and the CRC's position as a member of the North American Presbyterian and Reformed Council (NAPARC) was suspended in 1997. Several individual congregations continue to oppose women's ordination and women are not seated at some Classes (regional assemblies).
- The Orthodox Presbyterian Church does not ordain women.
- The Reformed Church in America began allowing for the ordination of women in 1979.
- The United Church of Christ ordains women. Antoinette Brown was ordained as a minister by a Congregationalist Church in 1853, though this was not recognized by her denomination. She later became a Unitarian. The Christian Connection Church, which later merged with the Congregationalist Churches to form the Congregational Christian Church, ordained women as early as 1810. Women's ordination is now non-controversial in the United Church of Christ.
- The Evangelical Covenant Order of Presbyterians (ECO) ordains women as both Teaching Elders (pastors) and Ruling Elders.
- The Evangelical Presbyterian Church (EPC) allows individual congregations to determine whether or not they ordain women.
- The Presbyterian Church in Canada began ordaining women as elders and as ministers in 1966.
- The United Church of Canada ordains women. The church was divided during the 1930s by this issue inherited from the churches it brought together, the United Church ordained its first woman minister, Reverend Lydia Emelie Gruchy, of Saskatchewan Conference in 1936. In 1953, Reverend Lydia Emelie Gruchy was the first Canadian woman to receive an honorary Doctor of Divinity.

==== Australia ====
- The Uniting Church in Australia has ordained women since it formed in 1977. The three member denominations, the Congregational Union of Australia, the Methodist Church of Australasia and the Presbyterian Church of Australia had all ordained women prior to Union. The Congregational Union of Australia ordained the first woman in Christian ministry in Australia, Rev Winifred Kiek in 1927. The Methodist Church of Australasia first ordained women (Rev Margaret Sanders and Rev Coralie Ling) in 1969, while the Presbyterian Church of Australia ordained its first woman minister in 1974. After formation of the Uniting Church in Australia, the continuing Presbyterian Church of Australia reversed the decision to ordain women in 1991.
- The Presbyterian Church of Australia does not ordain women. As mentioned above some of its congregations left to join the new Uniting Church in 1977, 14 years later in 1991 it ceased ordaining women to the ministry, but the rights of women ordained prior to this time were not affected.

==== Nigeria ====
- The Presbyterian Church of Nigeria does ordain women. In 1982, Mgbeke George Okore was ordained as a test case for women in ministry.

==== Pakistan ====
- The Presbyterian Church of Pakistan ordains women.

=== Other ===
- The Religious Society of Friends (Quakers) do not ordain anyone but have had women in leadership roles such as Recorded Minister since they first started in 1652. See Elizabeth Hooton and Mary Fisher It was longer before women held leadership roles in decision-making bodies that were historically exclusively men (e.g. Mary Jane Godlee was the first woman to clerk the London Yearly Meeting in 1918) - though the separate women's meetings did exercise significant authority.
- 'Christian Connection Church: An early relative of the Christian Church (Disciples of Christ) and the United Church of Christ, this body ordained women as early as 1810. Among them were Nancy Gove Cram, who worked as a missionary with the Oneida Indians by 1812, and Abigail Roberts (a lay preacher and missionary), who helped establish many churches in New Jersey. Others included Ann Rexford, Sarah Hedges and Sally Thompson.
- The Christian and Missionary Alliance in Canada has ordained women since 2016.
- The Christian and Missionary Alliance in the US has ordained women since 2023.
- The Moravian Church ordains women.
- The Czechoslovak Hussite Church ordains women.
- The Seventh-day Adventist Church officially does not ordain women in most of the world, but in regions of the United States, the Netherlands, parts of Germany, and China may occasionally ordain women. These ordinations are considered irregular and are not officially recognized in the church yearbook. In some parts of the world the Adventist Church commissions women instead of ordaining them. They can perform almost all of the same duties as an ordained minister but do not hold the title of ordained. This is because recent votes at the worldwide General Conference Sessions turned down a proposal to allow ordination of women. There was a strong polarization between nations, with Western countries and North Asia Pacific generally voting in support and other countries generally voting against. A further proposal to allow local choice was also turned down. In practice, there are numerous women working as ministers and in leadership positions. The most influential co-founder of the church, Ellen G. White, was a woman, but never ordained.
- Churches of Christ, because of their conservative stance, generally do not ordain women.
- The Christian Leaders Alliance allows women to serve as deacon ministers.

== Women as Protestant bishops ==
Some Protestant Churches, including those of the Lutheran, Hussite, Anglican, Methodist, and Moravian traditions, have allowed women to become bishops:

- 1924: Mount Sinai Holy Church of America – Ida B. Robinson served as founder and first presiding bishop
- 1929: Old Catholic Mariavite Church in Poland (and Catholic Mariavite Church, a 1935 schism from the Old Catholic Mariavite Church) – Maria Izabela Wiłucka-Kowalska and 11 nuns
- 1980: United Methodist Church – Marjorie Matthews
- 1988: Episcopal Church in the United States of America – Barbara Clementine Harris
- 1990: Anglican Church of New Zealand – Penelope Ann Bansall Jamieson
- 1992: North Elbian Evangelical Lutheran Church – Maria Jepsen
- 1993: Church of Norway (Lutheran) – Rosemarie Köhn
- 1993: Anglican Church of Canada – Victoria Matthews
- 1995: Church of Denmark (Evangelical Lutheran) – Lise-Lotte Rebel
- 1995: Church of Greenland – Sofie Petersen
- 1996: Church of Sweden (Evangelical Lutheran) – Christina Odenberg
- 1998: Moravian Church in America – Kay Ward
- 1998: United Church of Christ in the Philippines – Nelinda Primavera-Briones
- 1999: Czechoslovak Hussite Church – Jana Šilerová
- 1999: Evangelical Lutheran State Church of Hanover – Margot Käßmann
- 2000: African Methodist Episcopal Church – Vashti Murphy McKenzie
- 2001: North Elbian Evangelical Lutheran Church – Bärbel Wartenberg-Potter
- 2003: The Lutheran Evangelical Protestant Church (GCEPC) USA – Nancy K. Drew
- 2003: Church of Denmark (Evangelical Lutheran) – Elisabeth Dons Christensen
- 2007: Evangelical Lutheran Church in Canada – Susan Johnson
- 2008: Anglican Church of Australia – Kay Goldsworthy
- 2008: African Methodist Episcopal Zion Church – Mildred Hines
- 2009: Evangelical Church in Central Germany – Ilse Junkermann
- 2010: Evangelical Lutheran Church of Finland – Irja Askola
- 2011: North Elbian Evangelical Lutheran Church – Kirsten Fehrs
- 2011: Evangelical Church of Westphalia – Annette Kurschus, titled praeses
- 2012: Church of Iceland (Lutheran) – Agnes M. Sigurðardóttir
- 2012: Anglican Church of Southern Africa – Ellinah Wamukoya
- 2012: Anglican Church of Southern Africa – Margaret Vertue
- 2012: Church of Denmark – Tine Lindhardt
- 2013: Church of Denmark – Marianne Christiansen
- 2013: Church of Ireland (Anglican) – Pat Storey
- 2013: Evangelical Lutheran Church of America – Elizabeth Eaton
- 2014: Anglican Church in Aotearoa, New Zealand and Polynesia – Helen-Ann Hartley
- 2015: Church of England – Libby Lane, Alison White, Rachel Treweek, Sarah Mullally, Anne Hollinghurst, Ruth Worsley, Christine Hardman, Karen Gorham, Jo Bailey Wells, Jan McFarlane
- 2017: Church of England – Guli Francis-Dehqani, June Osborne
- 2017: Church of Denmark – Marianne Gaarden
- 2018: Scottish Episcopal Church – Anne Dyer
- 2018: Church in Wales – Joanna Penberthy
- 2019: Evangelical Church of Hesse Electorate-Waldeck – Beate Hofmann
- 2019: Evangelical Lutheran Church in Northern Germany – Kristina Kühnbaum-Schmidt
- 2022: Protestant Church in Baden – Heike Springhart
- 2025: Evangelical Church of Westphalia – Adelheid Ruck-Schröder
- 2026: Evangelical Lutheran Church in Brunswick – Christina-Maria Bammel
- Others: Protestant churches in German Lutheran, Reformed and United churches (EKD), Protestant Church of the Netherlands

=== Women as archbishops or denominational heads ===
- 1934 Salvation Army – Evangeline Booth becomes General of The Salvation Army.
- 1960 United Free Church of Scotland – Elizabeth Barr becomes Moderator of the General Assembly of the United Free Church of Scotland.
- 2001: Evangelical Church of Bremen – Brigitte Boehme, titled president, a laywoman since the presidency does not require theological skills
- 2004 Church of Scotland – Dr. Alison Elliot becomes moderator of the General Assembly
- 2005 Metropolitan Community Church – Nancy Wilson, first woman installed as moderator.
- 2006 The Episcopal Church – The Most Reverend Dr. Katharine Jefferts Schori. Installed as Presiding Bishop of the Episcopal Church and Primate (the same position which some other provinces in the Anglican Communion refer to as an Archbishop) at Washington National Cathedral on 4 November 2006, though she technically took office on the first of November.
- 2007 Evangelical Lutheran Church in Canada – Susan Johnson. First woman to serve as National Bishop of the ELCIC. She was consecrated 29 September 2007.
- 2008 The Wesleyan Church – Jo Anne Lyon. First woman to serve as a General Superintendent of the Wesleyan Church, and first to serve as the sole General Superintendent of the Wesleyan Church in its history. She was elected in June 2008 and 2012 respectively.
- 2012: Evangelical Church of Westphalia - Annette Kurschus
- 2013: Evangelical Church of Bremen - Edda Bosse
- 2013: Evangelical Lutheran Church of America – Elizabeth Eaton. First women installed as Presiding Bishop.
- 2014: Church of Sweden – Antje Jackelén Archbishop of Uppsala. Installed in Uppsala Cathedral on 15 June 2014.
- 2020: Evangelical-Lutheran Church in Denmark - Paneeraq Siegstad Munk As archbishop head of Greenland dioceses.
- 2021: Evangelical Church of the Palatinate – Dorothee Wüst, titled president.
- 2021: Evangelical Reformed Church in Germany – Susanne Bei der Wieden, titled president.
- 2022: Protestant Church in Baden - Heike Springhart
- 2024: Protestant Church in the Netherlands – Trijnie Bouw, titled president of synode.
- 2025: Protestant Church in Hesse and Nassau – Christiane Tietz, titled president.
- 2025: Evangelical Church of Westphalia - Adelheid Ruck-Schröder
- 2025: Church in Wales - Cherry Vann.
- 2025: Anglican Church of England - Sarah Mullally.
