= Union of Evangelical Churches in the EKD =

Evangelical churches' organization in Germany

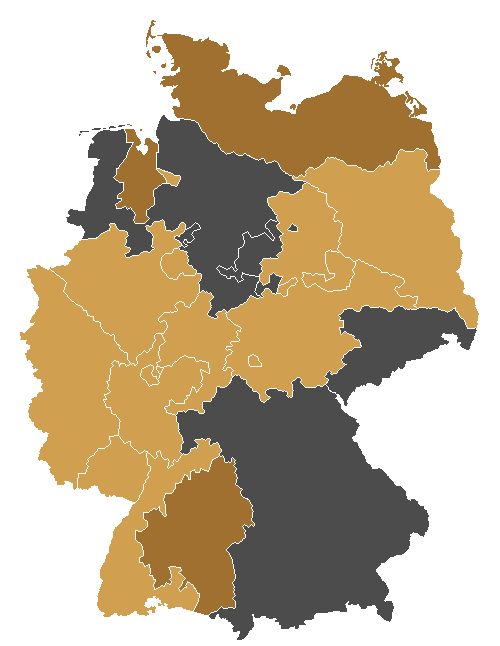
Member churches of the UEK are coloured in light brown, churches with the status of guests to the UEK are kept in a darker brown. The Evangelical Reformed Church is not depicted in the map.

The Union of Evangelical Churches (German: Union Evangelischer Kirchen, UEK) is an organisation of 10 United and 2 Reformed evangelical churches in Germany, which are all member churches of the Protestant Church in Germany.

== Member churches in the UEK ==
- Protestant Church of Anhalt
- Protestant Church in Baden
- Protestant Church Berlin - Brandenburg - Silesian Upper Lusatia (EKBO)
- Protestant Church of Bremen (BEK)
- Protestant Church of Hesse Electorate-Waldeck (EKKW)
- Protestant Church in Hesse and Nassau (EKHN)
- Church of Lippe
- Protestant Church in Central Germany
- Evangelical Church of the Palatinate
- Evangelical Reformed Church (regional church)
- Evangelical Church in the Rhineland
- Evangelical Church of Westphalia

Guests are

- Evangelical Lutheran Church in Northern Germany
- Evangelical Lutheran Church in Oldenburg
- Reformierter Bund
- Evangelical-Lutheran Church in Württemberg

== History ==
The UEK was founded on July 1, 2003. The organisation succeeded the former organisation Evangelical Church of the Union (German: Evangelische Kirche der Union, EKU). The seat of the organisation used to be Berlin. For structural reasons, it was moved to the seat of the Protestant Church in Germany (EKD) in Hanover though. On November 9, 2019, Union of Evangelical Churches allowed blessings of same-sex marriages.

== Structure ==
The parliament (=Vollkonferenz) of the organisation is an elected group of 47 members, which are elected for six years each term. The 47 members elect a "Präsidium".
