= Chrismon (magazine) =

German Lutheran magazine

Chrismon is a German Lutheran magazine appearing monthly as a supplement to the weekly journal Die Zeit and the daily newspapers Süddeutsche Zeitung, Frankfurter Allgemeine Zeitung (Hessen, Rheinland-Pfalz, Nordrhein-Westfalen, and as an ePaper in FAZ Kiosk) Altmark Zeitung, Die Welt, Dresdner Neueste Nachrichten, Hannoversche Allgemeine, Kölner Stadt-Anzeiger/Kölnische Rundschau, Kreiszeitung (Syke), Leipziger Volkszeitung, Märkische Allgemeine Zeitung, Neue Presse, General-Anzeiger, Neue Osnabrücker Zeitung, Rheinische Post (Teilauflage), Welt am Sonntag (nur Norddeutschland), Westdeutsche Allgemeine Zeitung (gelegentlich, Teilauflage) und Westfälischer Anzeiger. About 1.5 million copies are distributed monthly. It was founded in 2000 under the Name "Chrisma", (from 2002 "Chrismon") and arose from the Deutsches Allgemeines Sonntagsblatt. It is owned by the Evangelical Church in Germany.

Publishers are Annette Kurschus, Praeses (or in German Präses) of the Evangelical Church in Germany (EKD), and Anna-Nicole Heinrich (born 1996), the current praeses of the synod of the Evangelical Church in Germany.
