= Mgbeke =

- Gender: Female
- Language: Igbo

Origin
- Origin: Igboland
- Meaning: On Eke day
- Region of origin: Igboland

Mgbeke audio is a feminine Igbo name from south-eastern Nigeria which means "on Eke day". It is usually given to girls born on Eke day.

== Notable people with the name ==
- Mgbeke George Okore, Nigerian Presbyterian minister
