= Adelheid Ruck-Schröder =

German Protestant theologian and pastor (born 1966)

The Right Reverend Adelheid Ruck-Schröder
- Church: Protestant Church in Germany
- Appointed: 2025
- Predecessor: Annette Kurschus

Orders
- Ordination: 1999
- Consecration: 2025

Personal details
- Born: 1966 (age 59–60) Bietigheim, Baden-Württemberg, West Germany
- Spouse: Bernd Schröder
- Children: 2

Adelheid Ruck-Schröder (born 1966) is a German Protestant theologian, author and pastor. She is the president of the Protestant Church of Westphalia.

== Early life ==
Ruck-Schröder was born in 1966 in Bietigheim, Baden-Württemberg. She studied Protestant theology in Tübingen and Berlin.

== Career ==
In 1999, she was ordained in Havixbeck, North Rhine-Westphalia. She worked as pastor in Havixbeck and then in Saarbrücken. From 2011 she worked as pastor in Göttingen. From 2010 to 2012 she was moderator of the televangelist program Das Wort zum Sonntag (Note: English: The Word for Sunday) on ARD. From 2015 to 2021, she worked as theologian director at Loccum Abbey in Lower Saxony. From 2021 to 2025, she was regional bishop in Hildesheim/Göttingen for the Evangelical-Lutheran Church of Hanover. She published several works over Protestant theology.

In July 2025, Ruck-Schroeder became president (präses) of the Protestant Church of Westphalia.

== Personal life ==
Ruck-Schröder is married to Lutheran theologian Bernd Schröder. They have together two children.

== Works by Ruck-Schröder ==
- Muss die Bibel am Rand des Religionsunterrichtes stehen? In: Der evangelische Erzieher. Zeitschrift für Pädagogik und Theologie. Bd. 58 (2006), 3, p. 278–285.
- Der Name Gottes und der Name Jesu: eine neutestamentliche Studie (Wissenschaftliche Monographien zum Alten und Neuen Testament Bd. 80), Neukirchen-Vluyn 1999, zugl. Diss. Berlin 1997/98.
- F. Erichsen-Wendt, A. Ruck-Schröder: Pfarrer:in sein (Praktische Theologie konkret Band 5). 2022, ISBN 978-3-525-63065-5.
