= Mgbeke George Okore =

Nigerian Presbyterian minister

Mgbeke George Okore (1934–2014) was the first woman ordained for ministry in the Presbyterian Church of Nigeria.

== Biography ==
Okore was born in Mkpakpi village, in the local government area of Arochukwu/Ohafia in Abia State. She received her primary education from the Church of Scotland Mission School (1940–1946) and domestic science teacher training at Asaga-Ohafia Girls' School (1947), after which she taught for a number of years. She was the first woman to study at Trinity Union Theological College, Umuahia, and later left behind her six children to study in Canada, where she completed a diploma in Christian education from Ewart College and a BA in Religious Studies from the University of Toronto in 1976.

On February 20, 1982, Okore was ordained as the first female minister of the Presbyterian Church of Nigeria, as a test case for women in ministry in the denomination. She took up her first ministry post at St. Stephen's Presbyterian Church, Aba, in Abia State, and later served as principal the Hugh Goldie Lay/Theological Training Institution and as a consultant to the World Alliance of Reformed Churches. Her life and ministry has since been noted as inspiring other women into leadership positions in the Presbyterian Church of Nigeria.

== Works ==
- Okore, Mgbeke George (2005). Women in the Church Ministry. Lagos: JONAI.
