= Anna-Nicole Heinrich =

German church official

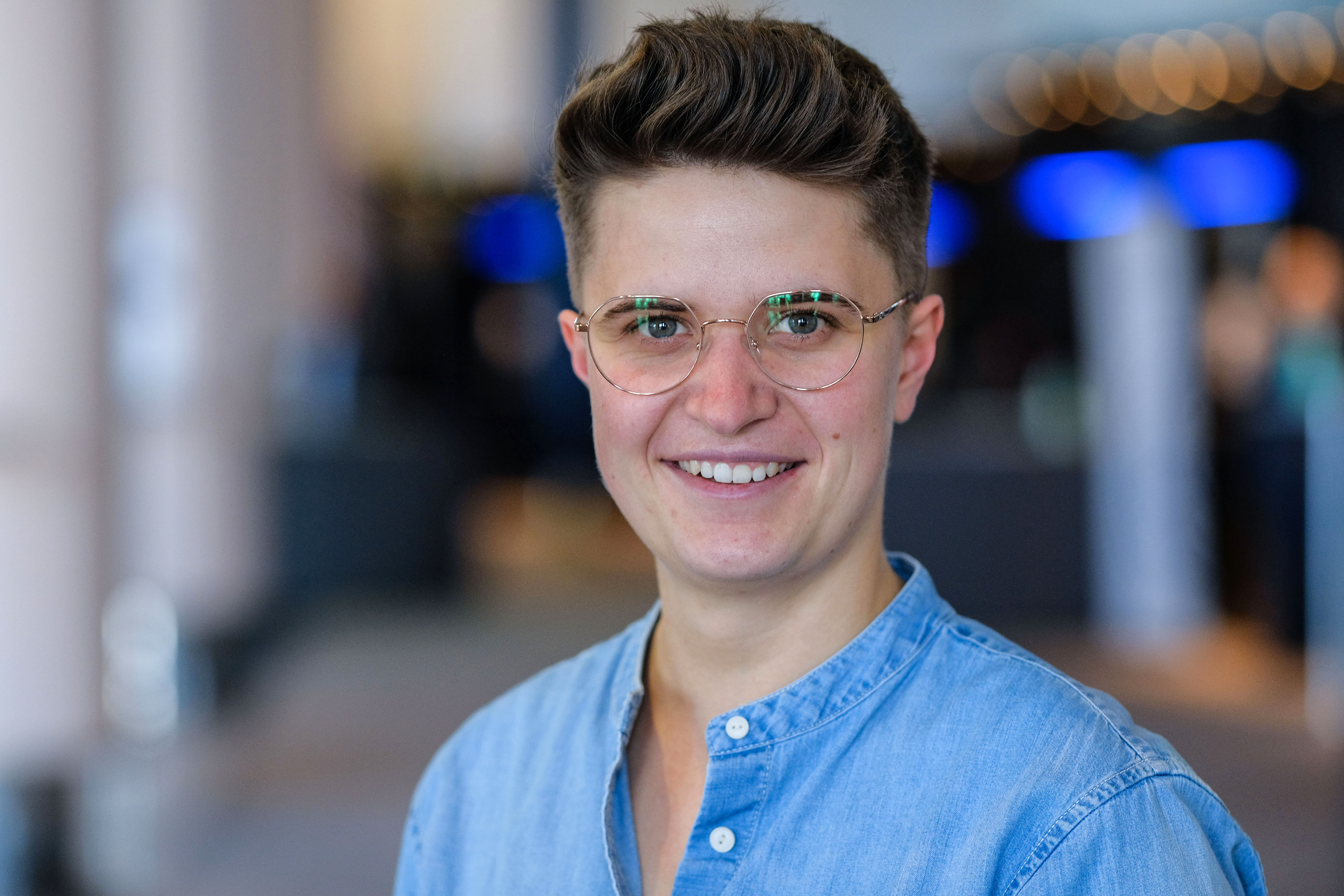
Anna Nicole Heinrich, 2021

Anna-Nicole Heinrich (born 1996) is the current praeses of the synod of the Evangelical Church in Germany.

== Biography ==
Heinrich was born to non-religious parents in Schwandorf. She grew up in Nittenau with her father working as a truck driver. She was baptised at school age with her mother. She studied philosophy at the University of Regensburg from 2015 to 2019, followed by a master's in digital humanities and ethics. She works as a research assistant at the chair of pastoral theology and homiletics.

Heinrich has been a board member of the youth wing of the German evangelical church since 2017 and member of the Bavarian synod since 2020. She was elected praeses in May 2021. At the age of 25, she is the youngest praeses of the Evangelical Church in Germany to date.
