= Kay Ward =

American Moravian bishop (born 1942)

Kay Lynaugh Ward (born 1942) is an American Moravian bishop. Ward was the first woman to be named a bishop in the Moravian Church.

== Career ==
She was director of continuing education at the Moravian Theological Seminary when she was elected a bishop by the Northern Province of the Moravian Church in 1998, becoming the first woman bishop in the Moravian Unity. Ward received her graduate degree from the Claremont School of Theology and has written books including a Bible study.
