= Yvonne V. Delk =

United Church of Christ religious leader (born 1939)

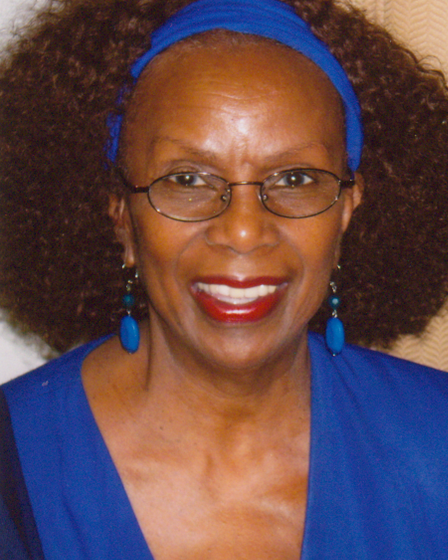
- Rev. Dr. Yvonne V. Delk in 2010
- Born: May 15, 1939 (age 87); Norfolk, Virginia
- Occupations: Christian minister, denominational executive, social justice activist
- Known for: Anti-racism and social justice advocacy
- Awards: Antionette Brown Award, YWCA Sojourner Truth Racial Justice Award

Yvonne V. Delk (born 1939) is a leader within the United Church of Christ (UCC), a Christian educator and social justice advocate. She was the first Black woman ordained in the United Church of Christ, and the second woman to hold a national leadership role in the denomination, serving as the head of the Office for Church and Society. She later served as executive director of the Community Renewal Society, an organization focused on issues of racism and poverty in Chicago. In this role, she addressed issues of homelessness, poverty, systemic racism, community health and affordable housing. She was the first woman and person of color to lead the organization. In 1997, Delk was recognized by Ebony as one of the top fifteen Black woman preachers in the US. In 2023, she edited and contributed to Afro-Christian Convention: The Fifth Stream of the United Church of Christ (Pilgrim Press), providing history of a forgotten tradition in African-American history.

== Biography ==
=== Early life and education ===
Yvonne Virginia Delk was born in Norfolk, Virginia on April 15, 1939, the third child born to her parents, Marcus Thomas Delk Sr. and Cora Elizabeth Chambers Delk. Delk recalls that her parents had lost a child prior to her birth and that her mother, Cora, experienced Delk's birth as a moment of rejuvenation. Delk credits this origin story of healing as a seed that fostered her focus on spirituality. In Norfolk, Delk's family experienced the impacts of Jim Crow laws, threats of violence, redlining, and other forms of anti-Black racism. Due to redlining, the family lived in the city's red light district. Although her father worked on the maintenance staff at Norfolk State College, he also took on additional jobs, including woodcutter, grave digger, and shipyard worker, in order to provide for the family.

Delk was encouraged by her family members to lead a life of spiritual devotion. Her mother, Cora, fostered this devotion by saying "No matter where life takes you, Yvonne, remember who you are and whose you are." Delk was also influenced by the example of her grandmother, Julia Anna Pope Delk, a minister in the United Holy Church and a co-founder of the church's Woman's Home and Foreign Missionary Department in 1917.

Yvonne's religious education started at home and at church, but she also attended a summer camp sponsored by the Convention of the South at Franklinton Center at Bricks in Whitakers, North Carolina. Franklinton Center, located on the grounds of a former college for previously enslaved persons, Brick Junior College, drew Delk toward an understanding of history, suffering, and spirituality and contributed to her focus on Christian education and the struggle for liberty. At Franklinton and in her home church, Delk met additional mentors who encouraged her to pursue training in Christian education. These mentors included Leila Waite Anderson, a traveling Christian educator, and Rev. Percel O. Alston, a superintendent of Christian education for the Convention of the South. Delk completed three Christian education programs prior to graduating from high school, served as a camp counselor at Franklinton Center, and taught Vacation Bible School and other Christian education programs in Black churches during her college years.

Delk graduated from high school in 1957 and began attending an HBCU, Norfolk State College. While in college, she joined the NAACP Youth Council of Virginia. As a young activist, she participated in organizing 103 sit-ins in segregated businesses in Norfolk, Virginia. Following the efforts of the Youth Council in Norfolk, the city's lunch counters were desegregated on July 23, 1960.

Delk graduated from Norfolk State College in 1961, having completed a Bachelor of Arts in sociology. She received a full scholarship to study Social Work at Atlanta University, but chose to pursue a master's degree in Religious Education at Andover Newton Theological Seminary in Newton, Massachusetts. Attending the predominantly white institution came with social and cultural barriers, but Delk persevered with the encouragement of her family and church. While studying at Andover, Delk joined the Student Nonviolent Coordinating Committee's Eastern Shores campaign in the Cambridge Civil Rights movement. Delk completed her master's degree in Religious Education and graduated from Andover in 1963.

=== Career ===
After graduating from seminary, Delk began working as a Christian educator in Atlanta, Georgia, at the First Congregational Church, a historic Black congregation. She served in this role from 1963 to 1965, during the time of the civil rights movement. Delk then moved to Cincinnati, Ohio, where she worked as a parish minister at the First Reformed Church of the UCC, a predominately white congregation that sought to integrate as the inner city neighborhood changed. Following the assassination of Martin Luther King Jr. and related unrest in the city, Mayor Eugene P. Ruehlmann appointed Delk to a commission to focus on the economic and racial inequities in Cincinnati. That same year, she began working at the national level, as one of only a handful of women on the UCC's National Committee of Black Churchmen.

In 1969, Delk left Cincinnati and joined the staff of the United Church Board for Homeland Ministries, thereby becoming the first Black woman to hold a national, program staff role in the denomination. She was secretary for Urban and Black Church Education, and specialized in producing educational materials relevant for use in these church settings. Her work called on her to travel throughout the United States to promote ecumenism and Afrocentric approaches to Christian education. It was through these travels that Delk met and worked with Jeremiah Wright and Barbara Jean Allen at Trinity Church UCC in Chicago. (She worked in this role until 1977.) She also led the Black Church Education Task Force for Joint Educational Development, an ecumenical Christian education program.

While attending her first meeting of the UCC General Synod, Delk met William Land, a civil rights activist and a leader of the UCC's Ministers for Racial and Social Justice (MRSJ). Delk joined with the MRSJ and James Foreman in support of a Black Manifesto that called for increased influence over the direction of the denomination's Interchurch Office in New York City. Although her participation in the protest, resulted in missing her formal introduction to the Synod members, her activism drew the attention of other church leaders. For example, the incoming Synod president, Robert V. Moss Jr., selected Delk to deliver the charge for the denomination's social justice mission.

In 1970, Delk traveled to Africa and visited countries in both West and East Africa. She remembered the experience as a formative one that contributed to her focus on Black liberation and anti-apartheid activism. For example, in 1973 Delk took the role as the leader of the Black Church Education Team of the Joint Education Development (an ecumenical organization of six denominations). In this role, Delk emphasized that Christian educators should seek to help Black children to see themselves as liberated, full human beings and not as objects of oppression.

After many years of working as a church educator, Delk was ordained in the United Church of Christ on November 17, 1974. Delk had struggled to become ordained because the process required a "call" from a local congregation, but due to her national activities, she did not have many opportunities to establish local relationships. To remedy this problem, several Black churches in Virginia collaborated to advocate for her ordination. The ordination service was completed at Fellowship United Church of Christ in Chesapeake, Virginia.

Although newly ordained and still completing graduate studies, Delk's reputation in the UCC resulted in the opportunity to provide the charge for the incoming president (1977) of the denomination, Avery D. Post. In the charge, Delk called for Post to "Be a drum major for justice." The following year, she completed a Doctor of Ministry degree in New York Theological Seminary.

In 1981, she was chosen to lead the UCC's Office of Church and Society, becoming the first Black woman to lead a national department for the UCC, and only the second woman. She had previously served as the affirmative action officer for the UCC, and before that she was an associate for constituency development in the Office of Church and Society. In 1989, Delk was nominated as a candidate in the election for the General Minister and President of the UCC, becoming the first woman nominated to lead the denomination. She lost the election to Rev. Dr. Paul Sherry.

Delk moved to Chicago to become the executive director of the Community Renewal Society, a UCC-affiliated non-profit organization that worked in the Chicago area to address poverty and homelessness. She was the first woman and first person of color to head the organization. While in Chicago, Delk also served on the editorial board of Sojourners and contributed essays calling for racial justice. After retiring from the Community Renewal Society, Delk founded the Center for African American Theological studies and taught classes affiliated with the Seminary Consortium for Urban Pastoral Education in Chicago.

=== Influence ===
Delk contributed to many programs that focused on ecumenism, racial justice, anti-poverty, and the full inclusion of marginalized persons in religious life. She mentored other women leaders and became an advocate for the LGBTQ participation in church leadership. She served as the chair of the Programme to Combat Racism of the World Council of Churches and chaired the WCC's Convocation on "Justice, Peace and the Integrity of Creation." While serving on the board of the Black Theology Project, an ecumenical Christian organization that pursued Black liberation theology, she worked with Cornel West to bring more women's voices the project. She chaired the National Planning Committee on Children in Poverty and presented its findings to the U.S. House of Representatives in 1988.

Delk's ordination and work for the UCC provided a pathway for the inclusion of other women in religious leadership. Her work on a Black church curriculum inspired others to pursue leadership positions in the UCC. And her efforts to combat injustice at local, national, and global levels encouraged others to work toward building a more inclusive church.

=== Personal life ===
In retirement, Delk moved to Norfolk, Virginia, to be closer to her extended family. Although retired and in her eighties, Delk continued to preach and advocate for social justice in area churches.

== Awards ==
Delk received the UCC's Antionette Brown Award in 1979 for "trailblazing leadership". She was awarded the YWCA Sojourner Truth Racial Justice Award in 1994. In 1997, she was named by Ebony Magazine as one of the "15 Greatest Black Women Preachers" in the country. In 2020, the Virginia Council of Churches gave her a lifetime award in ecumenism.
