= Marie Jerge =

American Lutheran bishop (born 1953)

- Church: Evangelical Lutheran Church in America
- Diocese: Upstate New York Synod
- In office: 2002–2014
- Predecessor: Lee M. Miller
- Successor: John S. Macholz

Orders
- Ordination: 1978

Personal details
- Born: Mineola, NY, United States
- Denomination: Lutheranism

Rev. Marie C. Jerge (née Scharfe, born c. 1953) is a former bishop of the Evangelical Lutheran Church in America.

She graduated from Babylon High School in 1970 and earned a bachelor of arts degree from Smith College in 1974. In 1978, she received a master of divinity degree from Lutheran Theological Seminary at Philadelphia and was ordained as a minister.

She was elected in 2002 to a six-year term as bishop of the Evangelical Lutheran Church in America's (ELCA) Upstate New York Synod. She was the sixth woman to be elected as a synod bishop in the ELCA. Jerge (YER-gee) succeeded the Rev. Lee M. Miller, who did not seek re-election after serving as bishop of the synod for 10 years. She was installed on September 21, 2002.

In her time as bishop, she oversaw 198 churches with over 150,000 congregants. She requested the resignation of a pastor who was accused of sexual activity with multiple minors in 2004. In January 2009, during the Gaza War, she traveled with a delegation of American bishops to Israel and Palestine to meet with local officials.

She led the final service at Christ Lutheran Church in Little Falls, New York.

Jerge has written on the benefits of immigration reform.

She received an honorary degree from Thiel College in 2006 and an alumni award from Lutheran Theological Seminary at Philadelphia in 2015.

After serving two terms, she was succeeded in 2014 by John S. Macholz.

== Personal life ==
Jerge was born Marie Charlotte Scharfe in Mineola, New York. Her father, Charles L. Scharfe Jr., was vice chairman and chief executive officer of L. K. Comstock & Company.

Jerge married James N. Jerge in 1977; he is also a minister in the ELCA.
