= Susanne Bei der Wieden =

German Protestant theologian and pastor (born 1966)

The Right Reverend Susanne Bei der Wieden
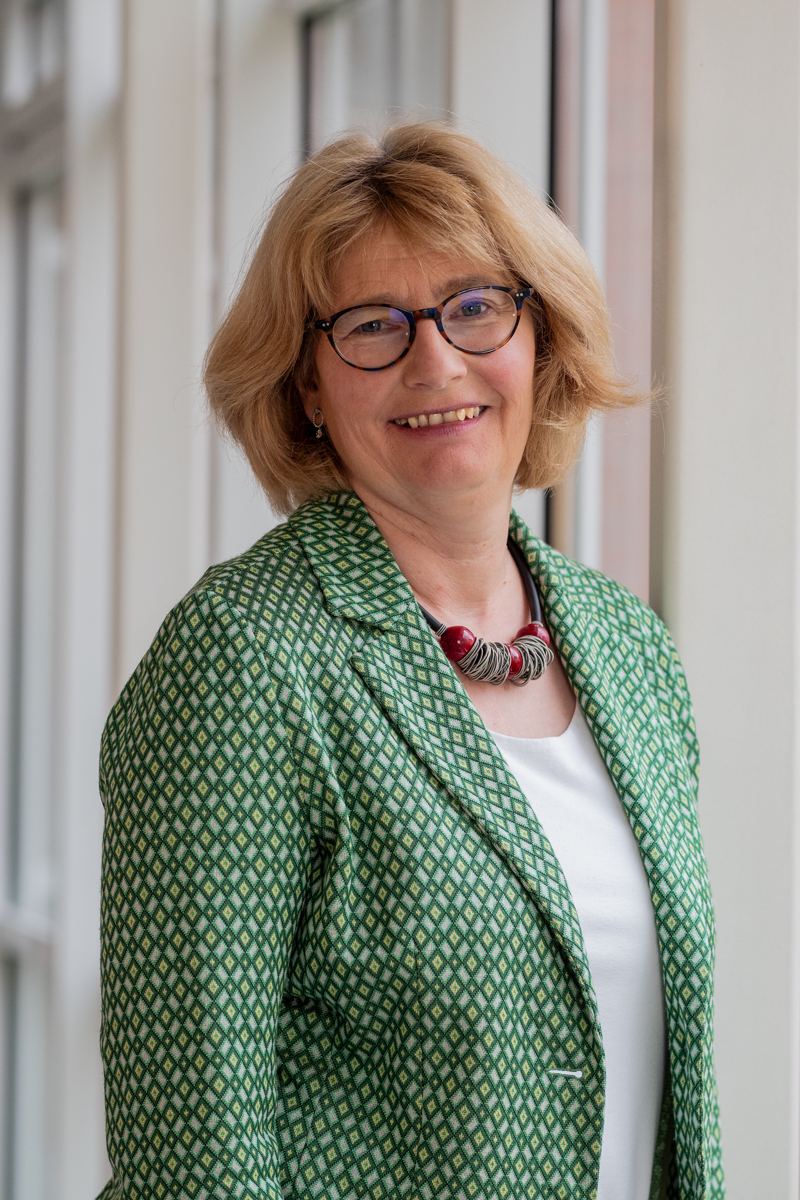
- Church: Protestant Church in Germany
- Appointed: 2021
- Predecessor: Martin Heimbucher

Personal details
- Born: 1966 (age 59–60) Darmstadt, West Germany
- Children: 1

Susanne Bei der Wieden (born 1966) is a German theologian of Reformed Christianity.

== Life ==
Bei der Wieden was born in Darmstadt. She studied theology in Wuppertal and in Göttingen. She worked as vicar in Kinzenbach in Hessen and has been a pastor in Frankfurt am Main since 2003.

Since 2021 she has been church president of Evangelical Reformed Church in Germany.
