= Susan Johnson (bishop) =

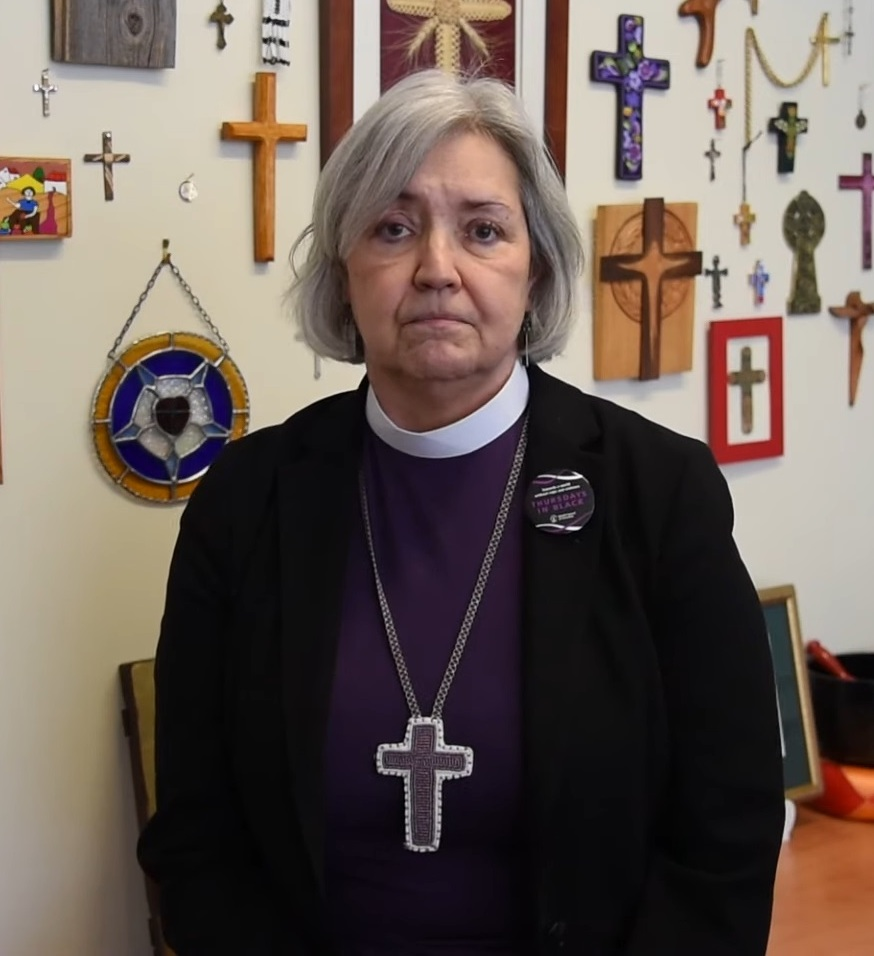
Johnson in 2022

Susan Johnson is a Lutheran minister who served as National Bishop of the Evangelical Lutheran Church in Canada (ELCIC) from 2007 to 2025.
