= Dorothee Wüst =

German Protestant theologian and pastor (born 1966)

The Right Reverend Dorothee Wüst
- Church: Protestant Church in Germany
- Appointed: 2021
- Predecessor: Christian Schad

Orders
- Consecration: 2021

Personal details
- Born: 1965 (age 60–61) Pirmasens, West Germany
- Children: 1

Dorothee Wüst (born March 25, 1965 in Pirmasens) is a bishop of Evangelical Church of the Palatinate.

== Life ==
Wüst was born in 1965 in Pirmasens. Since 2021 Wüst is president of Evangelical Church of the Palatinate. She studied Protestant theology in Mainz and in Heidelberg. She worked as vicarin in Imsbach. In Kaiserslautern and in Weilerbach she worked as pastor Since 2012 she worked at university in Kaiserslautern. Since 2021 she is bishop, titled president, of Evangelical Church of the Palatinate.
