= Evangelical Reformed Church (Germany) =

Christian denomination

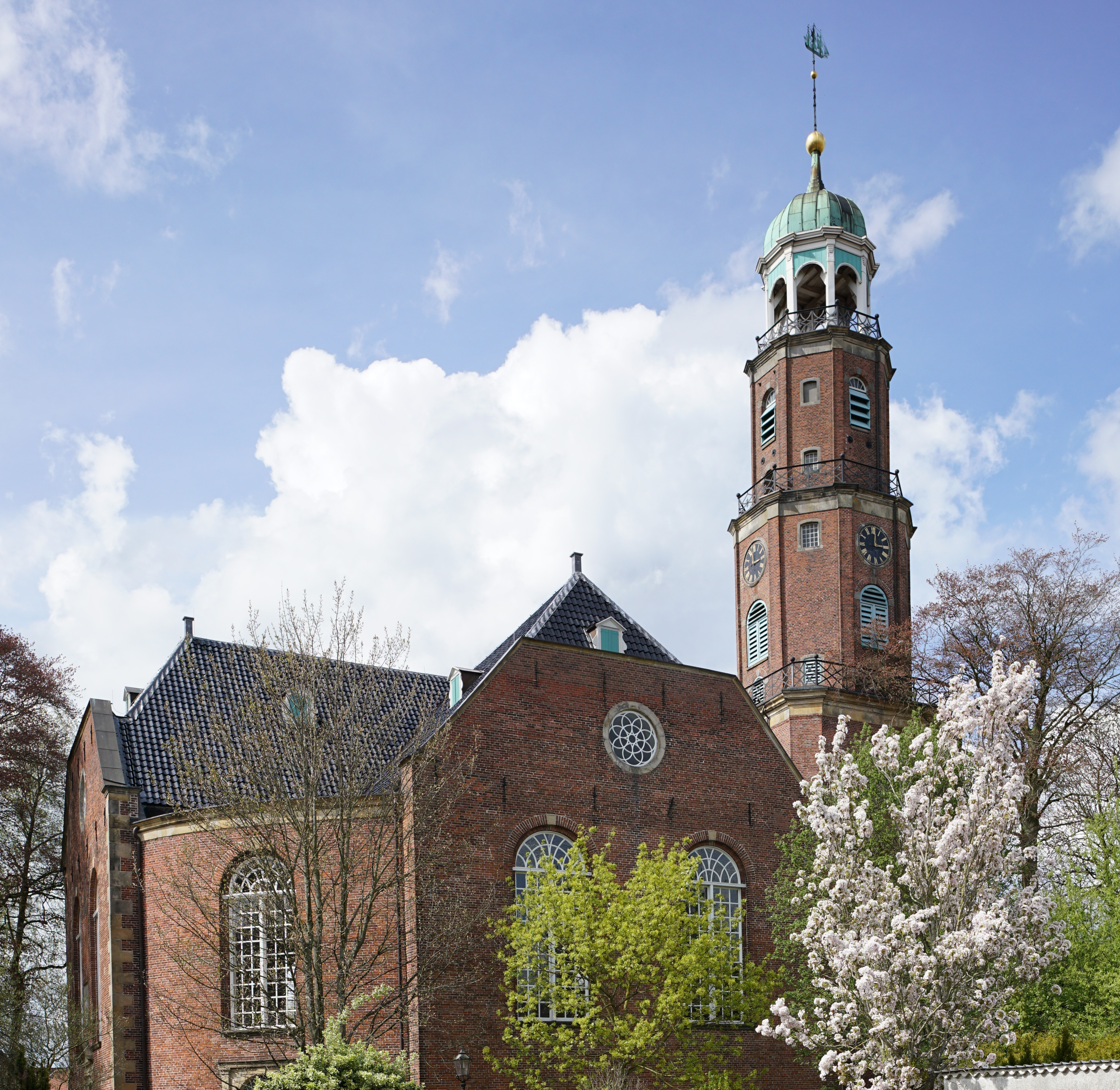
The Big Church in Leer

The Evangelical Reformed Church (German: Evangelisch-reformierte Kirche), until 2009 Evangelical Reformed Church – Synod of Reformed Churches in Bavaria and Northwestern Germany (German: Evangelisch-reformierte Kirche – Synode evangelisch-reformierter Kirchen in Bayern und Nordwestdeutschland) is a Calvinist member church of the Evangelical Church in Germany (EKD).

It has its seat in Leer (East Frisia). The church has 146,848 parish members in 136 parishes (December 2025) and is one of the two reformed churches within the EKD. Member of the Reformed Alliance. It also belonged to the Confederation of Evangelical Churches in Lower Saxony, and is a member of the Union of Evangelical Churches in the EKD. It is also a member of the Communion of Protestant Churches in Europe. The main church of the Protestant Reformed Church is the Große Kirche ("Big Church") in Leer. Since 2021 Susanne Bei der Wieden is president of the Protestant Reformed Church.

Ordination of women and blessing of same-sex marriages are allowed.
