= Heike Springhart =

German Protestant theologian and pastor

The Right Reverend Heike Springhart
- Church: Protestant Church in Germany
- Appointed: 2022
- Predecessor: Jochen Cornelius-Bundschuh

Orders
- Ordination: 2008
- Consecration: 2022

Personal details
- Born: 1975 (age 50–51) Basel

Heike Springhart (born 1975) is a German bishop of Protestant Church in Baden.

== Life ==
Springhart was born in 1975 in Basel. She studied Protestant theology in Bielefeld, Leipzig, Basel and Heidelberg. She worked in Waldwimmersbach and Lobenfeld and was ordained as pastor in 2008. From 2008 to 2013 she worked at university in Heidelberg. From 2018 o 2020 Springhart worked as pastor in Mannheim. Since April 1, 2022 Springhart is bishop of Protestant Church in Baden.

== Works by Springhart ==
- Aufbrüche zu neuen Ufern: der Beitrag von Religion und Kirche für Demokratisierung und Reeducation im Westen Deutschlands nach 1945. EVA, Leipzig 2008.
- Der verwundbare Mensch: Sterben, Tod und Endlichkeit im Horizont einer realistischen Anthropologie. Mohr Siebeck, Tübingen 2016.
- „... wie auch wir vergeben unseren Schuldigern...“? Zu einer theologischen Lehre von der Vergebung. In: Evangelische Theologie 76/2 (2016), p. 111–121.
- Wer redet, wenn „die Kirche“ redet? Über frommes Schweigen, unfrommes Dauerreden und wohlfeile Kirchenkritik. In: Zeitzeichen 21/8 (2020), p. 8–11.
- Gottesdienstliches digitales Neuland in Zeiten der Pandemie: ein Erfahrungsbericht in theologischer Absicht. In: Evangelische Theologie 81/2 (2021), p. 124–135.
- Wunder aus Wunden. Die Notkirchen als Räume der Versöhnung aus der Kraft der Ökumene, Sonderpublikation anlässlich der Vollversammlung des Ökumenischen Rats der Kirchen 2022 in Karlsruhe in Deutsch, English, Francais und Espanol, together with Jeff Klotz (ed.), Peter Scherhans, Christian Albecker, Sybille Stohrer, Rudi Popp und Victor Dehez (translator), J.S. Klotz Verlagshaus, Bauschlott 2022.
- Hoffnungsstur und glaubensheiter. Warum wir starke Kirchen brauchen, Annette Kurschus, Jürgen Moltmann, Evelyn Finger. J. S. Klotz Verlagshaus, Bauschlott 2022.
