= Brigitte Boehme =

German lawyer and church administrator

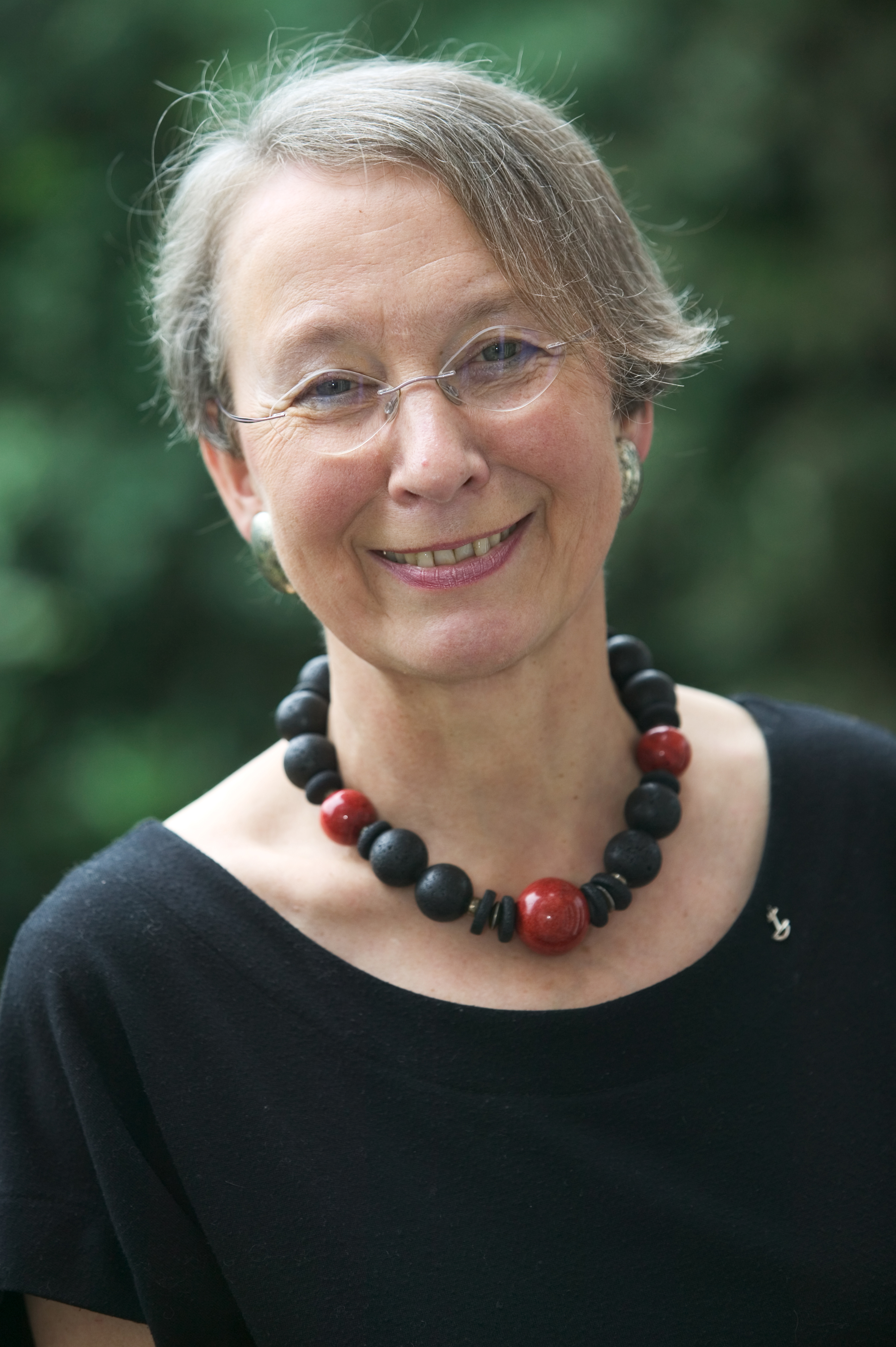
- Born: 21 June 1940 (age 85); Oldenburg, Germany
- Education: Marburg University
- Occupations: Judge; Church administrator
- Organizations: Bremische Evangelische Kirche
- Awards: Bremer Stadtmusikantenpreis

Brigitte Boehme (born 21 June 1940) is a German lawyer and church administrator. She was the president of the Kirchenausschuss (church committee) of the Bremische Evangelische Kirche (Bremen Protestant Church) from 2001 to 2013.

== Life ==
Born in Oldenburg, Boehme studied law in Marburg from 1959 to 1965, taking the first Staatsexamen in 1966, the second in 1970. She worked as a judge at the Amtsgericht in Bremen until 1988, then as a judge at the Hanseatisches Oberlandesgericht Bremen, the Oberlandesgericht, until her retirement in 2005.

She grew up without contact with religion, but decided to become baptized in 1982. As president, she conducted the meetings of the synod of the Bremen Protestant Church. She was trained from 2004 to 2006 to be a lay preacher. She has served in that function in her parish, St. Ansgarii.

Boehme was instrumental in having the German Kirchentag (literally: Church Day, the German Evangelical Church Assembly) of 2009 in Bremen and organizing it. The motto of the 32nd Kirchentag was "Mensch, wo bist du?" (Man, where are you?) It was the first time that a biblical motto was a question. Boehme expressed the hope that the "new challenge" ("neue Herausforderung") of organizing the event, with support from neighbour churches and the political and social forces of Bremen ("mit Unterstützung der Nachbarkirchen sowie der politischen und gesellschaftlichen Kräfte in unserem Zwei-Städte-Staat"), would result in a win of impulses and experiences, contacts and meetings ("Zugewinn an Impulsen und Erfahrungen, an Kontakten und Begegnungen"). She was awarded the Bremer Stadtmusikantenpreis of 2009 in the category Bürgerschaftliches Engagement (Citizen's engagement), along with Victor von Bülow in the category Media. From 2009 to 2014, Boehme was a member of the synod of the EKD (Protestant Church in Germany). She was a candidate for the highest office of the synod, Präses, in 2013, received the highest number of votes, but not the needed majority.
