= Bremen Evangelical Church =

United Protestant member church of the Protestant Church in Germany

Map of the Bremen Evangelical Church in Germany

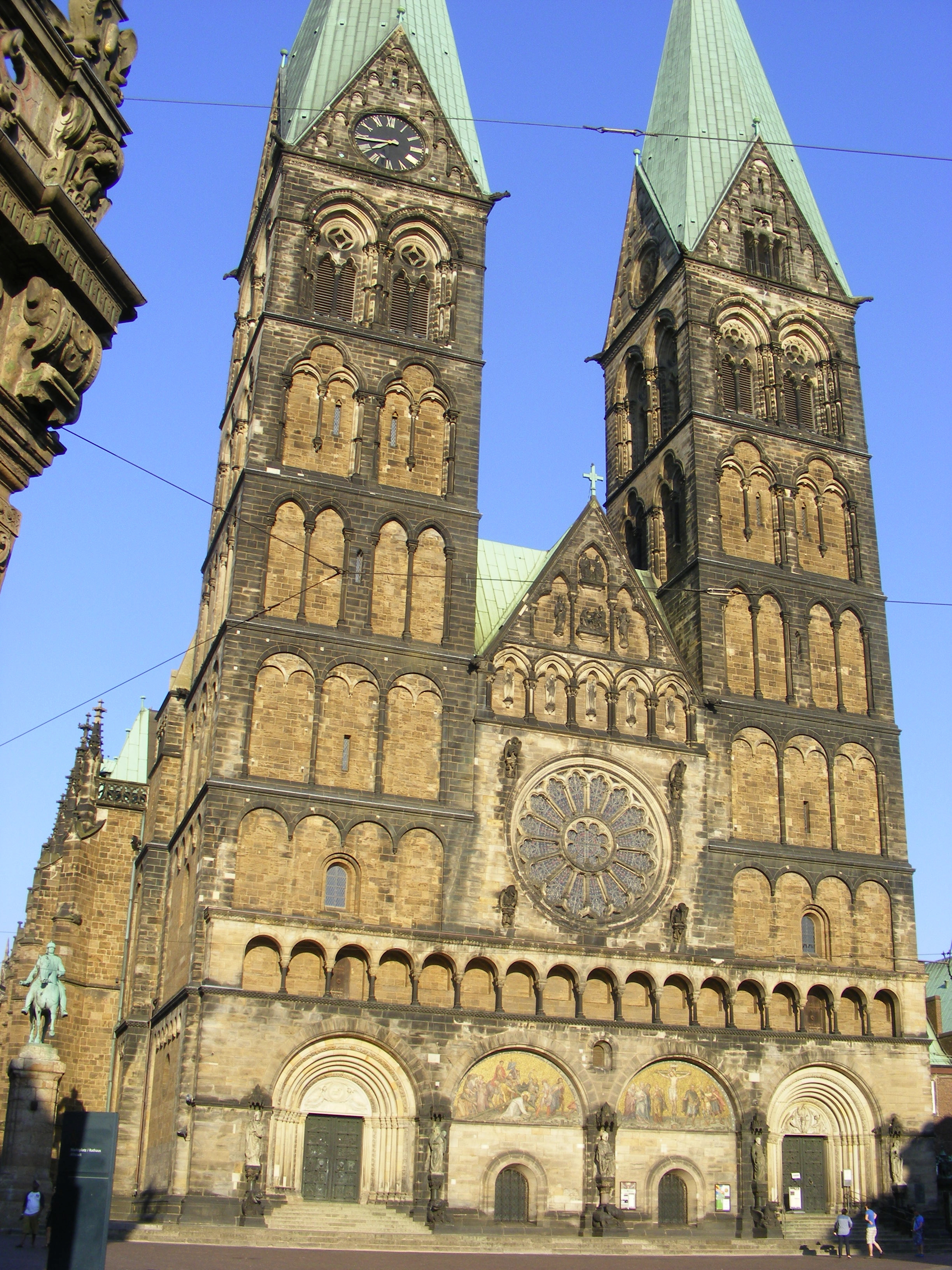
Bremen Cathedral, western façade

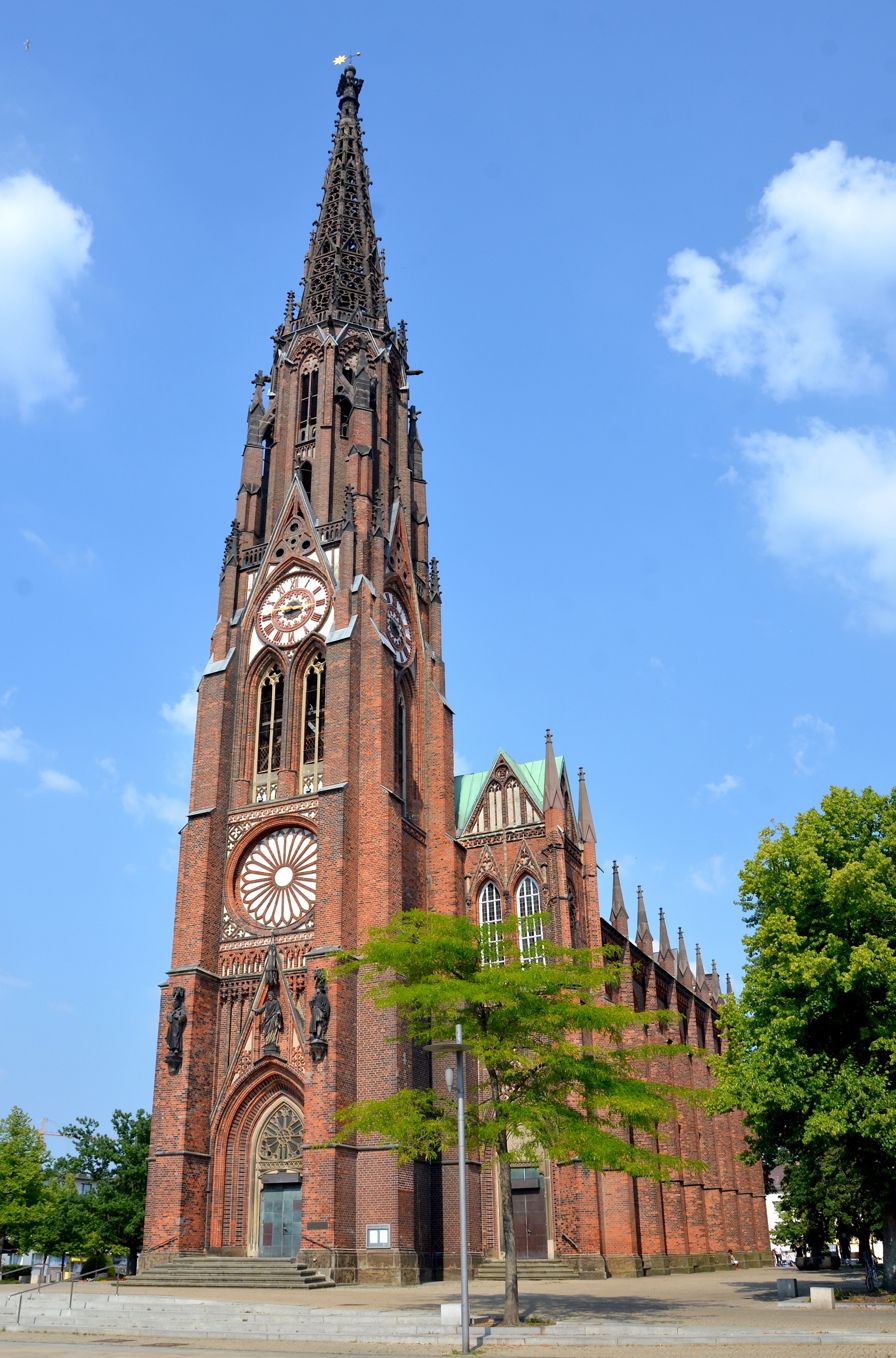
Mayor Smidt Memorial Church

The Bremen Evangelical Church (German: Bremische Evangelische Kirche) is a United Protestant member church of the Evangelical Church in Germany in the Free Hanseatic City of Bremen.

The seat of the church is in Bremen. It is a full member of the Evangelical Church in Germany (EKD), and is a United church combining both Lutheran and Reformed traditions. Brigitte Boehme became the church's first female president in 2001. The church had 147,745 members as of December 2025 in 52 parishes. Laic presidency is one of the special characteristics of the Bremen Evangelical Church. It has no theological headmaster. The parishes have a high degree of autonomy, and there is a great variety between liberal and conservative ones. Each member of the church has the free choice, which parish he wants to join. Bremen Cathedral is the most prominent place of worship, but it has no higher status than any other parish. The Bremen Evangelical Church is a member of the Union of Evangelical Churches in the EKD and of the Communion of Evangelical Churches in Europe. In Bremen the church has its own academy. The church has allowed the ordination of women and the blessing of same-sex marriages.

== Area covered ==
The area covered by the Bremen Evangelical Church (BEK) is essentially equivalent to the city of Bremen. In the city of Bremerhaven, which together with Bremen forms the state Free Hanseatic City of Bremen, only the most important Protestant church, the united Protestant Mayor Smidt Memorial Church, belongs to the BEK. The bulk of the other Protestant church parishes in Bremerhaven is Lutheran and they belong to the Evangelical Lutheran Church of Hanover, some form part of other not regionally-delineated Protestant denominations. The area covered by these parishes belonged to the former Province of Hanover before 1947.

== Presidents of the church committee ==
- 1920–1932: Dr. Theodor Lürman
- 1932–1933: Dr. Rudolph Quidde
- 1933–1945: ?
- 1945–1946: Richard Ahlers
- 1946–1959: Ferdinand Donandt
- 1959–1969: Dr. Arnold Rutenberg
- 1969–1977: Heinz Hermann Brauer
- 1976–1989: Eckart Ranft
- 1989–2001: Heinz Hermann Brauer
- 2001–2013: Brigitte Boehme
- 2013-2025: Edda Bosse
- since 2025: Bernd Kuschnerus

== Synod (Kirchentag) ==
The election of the synod is for six years. The elected leader of the "Kirchentag" is also leader of the church.

== History ==
When the Protestant Reformation swept through Northern Germany, Bremen's first Protestant prayer took place in one of the chapels of St. Ansgar's Church, Bremen on 9 November 1522. Since that year Bremen was a prevailingly Protestant city. St Peter's Cathedral then belonged to the cathedral immunity district (German: Domfreiheit; cf. also Liberty), an extraterritorial enclave of the neighbouring Prince-Archbishopric of Bremen. The then still Catholic cathedral chapter closed St Peter's in 1532, after a mob of Bremen's burghers forcefully interrupted the Catholic mass and prompted Jacob Probst, the pastor of the nearby Our Lady Church, to preach a Lutheran sermon.

The Roman Catholic Church was condemned as a symbol of the abuses of a long Catholic past by most local burghers. In 1547 the chapter, meanwhile prevailingly Lutheran, appointed the Dutch Albert Hardenberg, called Rizaeus, as the first Cathedral preacher of Protestant affiliation. Rizaeus turned out to be a partisan of the rather Zwinglian understanding of the Lord's Supper, which was rejected by the then Lutheran majority of burghers, city council, and chapter. So in 1561, after tremendous quarrels, Rizaeus was dismissed and banned from the city and the cathedral shut again its doors.

However, as a consequence of that controversy the majority of Bremen's burghers and city council adopted Calvinism until the 1590s, while the chapter, being simultaneously the body of secular government in the neighbouring Prince-Archbishopric, clung to Lutheranism. This antagonism between a Calvinistic majority and a Lutheran minority, though of a powerful position in its immunity district (belonging since 1648 to Bremen-Verden and annexed to the Free Hanseatic City of Bremen in 1803), remained determinant until in 1873 the Calvinist and Lutheran congregations in Bremen reconciled and founded a united administrative umbrella, the still existing Bremian Evangelical Church, comprising the bulk of Bremen's burghers.

In 1922 the Bremian church counted about 260,000 parishioners.

== Books ==
- Book for singing of the evangelisch-lutherischen Domgemeinde to Bremen, Bremen, since 1779
- New Bremisches Psalm- and Book for Singing for official and "besonderen Erbauung der Reformirten Stadt-und Landgemeinden, mit Hoch-Obrigkeitlicher Bewilligung", editor from the Bremischen Ministerio, Bremen, 1767; with later title "Evangelisches Gesangbuch, hrsg. vom Predigerverein der fünf reformierten Gemeinden im Herzogtum Bremen", Vegesack, since 1857
- Praying book and book for singing - "Neue durch einen Anhang vermehrte Ausgabe", Bremen, 1864
- "Christliches Gesangbuch zur Beförderung öffentlicher und häuslicher Andacht", Bremen, 1812
- Book for singing "gemeinschaftlicher und einsamer Andacht, at the beginning only for the "vereinigte evangelische Gemeine of Bremerhaven", Bremerhaven", since February 1857
- Evangelical book for singing of parishes in Bremen, Bremen, since March 1873
- Bremer Gesangbuch, Gütersloh, since 1917
- Evangelical book for singing - Book for singing of the Evangelical-Lutheran Churches in Schleswig-Holstein-Lauenburg, Mecklenburg, Hamburg, Lübeck, Eutin and the Evangelical Church of Bremen, Hamburg, 1949
- Evangelical Kirchengesangbuch - Edition for the Evangelical Church of Bremen, Hamburg, since 1950
- Evangelisches Gesangbuch - Edition for the Evangelical-Lutheran Churches in Lower-Saxony and for the Evangelical Church of Bremen, Hanover/Göttingen, since 1994
