= Marjorie Matthews =

American bishop (1916–1986)

Bishop Marjorie Matthews
- Church: United Methodist Church

Orders
- Ordination: 1965
- Consecration: 1980

Personal details
- Born: July 11, 1916 Onaway, Michigan
- Died: June 30, 1986 (aged 69) Grand Rapids, Michigan

Marjorie Swank Matthews (July 11, 1916 – June 30, 1986) was an American bishop of the United Methodist Church and the first woman to serve as a Methodist bishop.

== Early life ==
She was born July 11, 1916, in Onaway, Michigan, to Jesse Alonzo and Charlotte Mae (Chapman) Swank. She married young and divorced after World War II. She had one son, William Jesse Matthews. She worked at Lobdell-Emery Manufacturing Company in Alma, Michigan to support herself and her son.

== Education ==
Matthews graduated summa cum laude with a bachelor's degree from Central Michigan University in 1967. She then went on to receive a Bachelor of Divinity degree from Colgate Rochester Divinity School in 1970. Completing her schooling at Florida State University, she received both a master's in religion and a doctorate in humanities in 1976.

== Ministry ==
While Matthews was completing her education, she served as an elder in churches in her home state of Michigan, as well as New York and Florida. She was the second female district superintendent in the United Methodist Church. She served as superintendent of the Grand Traverse District from 1976.

=== Ordained ministry ===
During July 1980, the North Central Jurisdiction of United Methodist Church met for an annual conference. There were only 23 female clergy in attendance out of 460 delegates. The delegates in attendance represented the states of Illinois, Indiana, Iowa, Michigan, Minnesota, North Dakota, Ohio, South Dakota, and Wisconsin. During the conference, there were 13 delegates, Matthews included, who were running for three bishop seats. After twenty-nine ballots, two bishops were elected by acclamation on the thirtieth ballot at the North Central Jurisdictional Conference on July 17, 1980. Matthews was elected the first woman bishop at the United Methodist Church North Central regional conference in Dayton, Ohio. She served as bishop for the Wisconsin area for four years before retiring in 1984. On June 30, 1986, Matthews died of breast cancer in Grand Rapids, Michigan. She was inducted into the Michigan Women's Hall of Fame in 1986.

== See also ==
- List of bishops of the United Methodist Church
