= Ilse Junkermann =

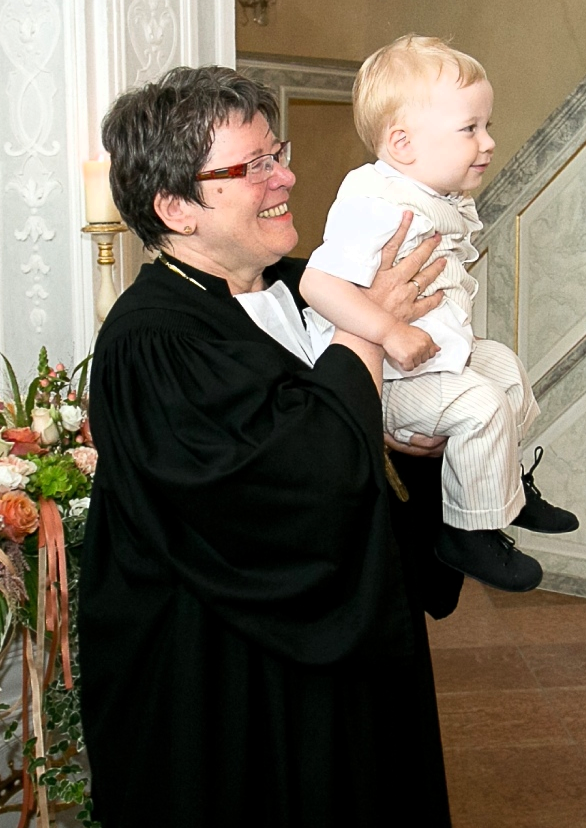
Ilse Junkermann

Ilse Junkermann (born 31 May 1957 in Dörzbach an der Jagst) is a German bishop and was from 2009 to 2019 German bishop of the Evangelical Church in Central Germany, a member church of the Evangelical Church in Germany. She was the first woman to become Landesbischof there. She is a pacifist.

== Life ==
Junkermann studied Protestant theology at the universities of Tübingen and Göttingen. Junkermann is divorced and has one son.
