= Evangelical Church of Westphalia =

United Protestant church body in North Rhine-Westphalia

Coordinates: 52°01′16.98″N 8°31′59.16″E

The Evangelical Church of Westphalia (German: Evangelische Kirche von Westfalen, EKvW) is a United Protestant church body in North Rhine-Westphalia.

Lutheran Church of Westphalia

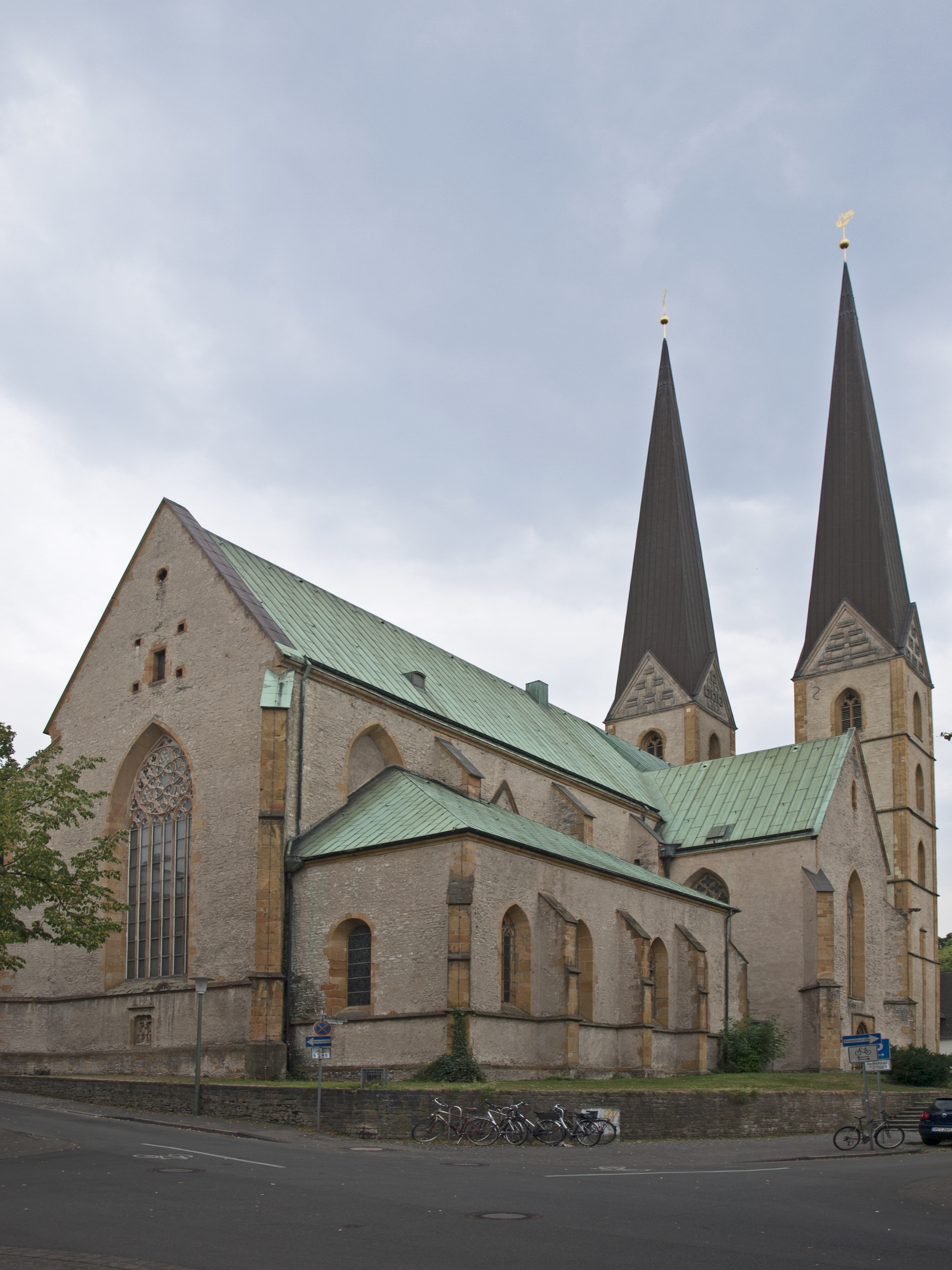
Neustädter Marienchurch in Bielefeld

The seat of the praeses (German: Präses, the head of the church) is Bielefeld. The EKvW emerged on 13 June 1945, when the ecclesiastical province of Westphalia within the Lutheran Church of the old-Prussian Union assumed its independence as church body of its own. The EKvW is a full member of the Evangelical Church in Germany (EKD), and the Reformed Alliance and is a church whose bases are in a Union between parishes in Lutheran and Calvinistic traditions. The church is also a member of the Communion of Protestant Churches in Europe. Präses (president) of the EKvW is Annette Kurschus (2012), as its first female leader.

== Präses (President) ==
- 1834–1835: Jakob von der Kuhlen
- 1835–1841: Christian Nonne
- 1841–1843: Bernhard Jacobi
- 1844–1874: Wilhelm Diedrich Albert
- 1874–1902: Ludwig Polscher
- 1902–1914: Friedrich König
- 1914–1927: Heinrich Kockelke
- 1927–1949: Karl Koch (until 1934 Präses der Provinzialsynode, 1934–1945 of Bekenntnissynode, since 1945 of synode)
- 1949–1968: Ernst Wilm
- 1969–1977: Hans Thimme
- 1977–1985: Heinrich Reiß
- 1985–1996: Hans-Martin Linnemann
- 1996–2004: Manfred Sorg
- 2004–2012: Alfred Buß
- 2012–2023: Annette Kurschus
- since 2025: Adelheid Ruck-Schröder

== Practices ==
The church permits the ordination of women. Blessing of same-sex marriages has been allowed from 2019.
