= Annette Kurschus =

German Protestant theologian and pastor (born 1963)

The Right Reverend Annette Kurschus
- Chair of the Council of the Protestant Church in Germany (2021–2023); Praeses of the Protestant Church in Westphalia (2012–2023)
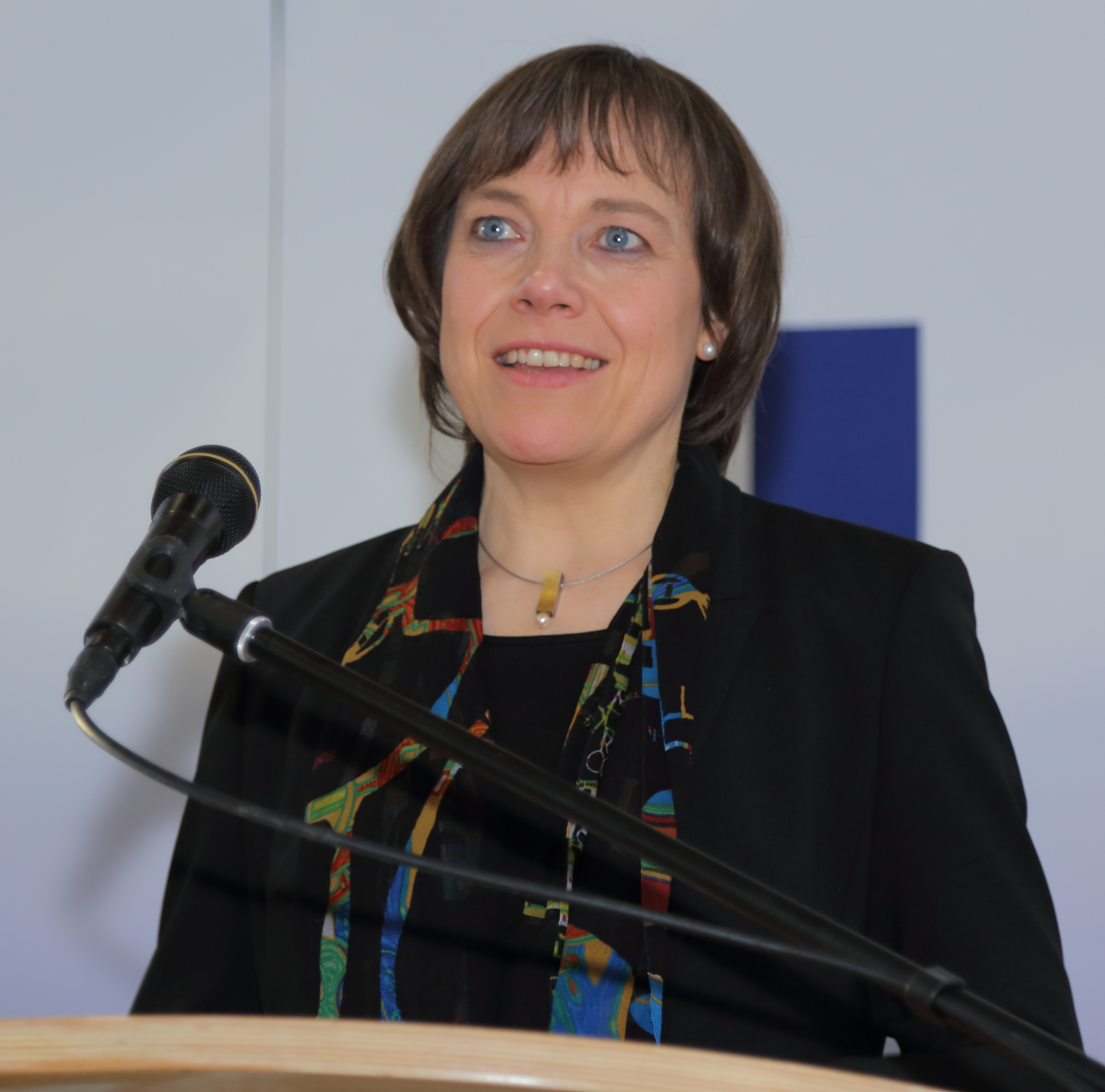
- Church: Protestant Church in Germany
- Appointed: 2021
- Predecessor: Heinrich Bedford-Strohm
- Successor: Kirsten Fehrs

Orders
- Ordination: 1993
- Consecration: 4 March 2012

Personal details
- Born: 14 February 1963 (age 63) Rotenburg an der Fulda, West Germany
- Parents: Georg Kurschus

Annette Kurschus (born 14 February 1963 in Rotenburg an der Fulda) is a German Protestant theologian and pastor. She was Praeses (or in German Präses) of the Protestant Church of Westphalia from 2012 until 2023, in November 2015 she became vice-president of the Council of the Protestant Church in Germany (EKD – Evangelische Kirche in Deutschland). She was President of the Council of the EKD from 2021 until 2023.

== Origin and education ==
Annette Kurschus grew up in Obersuhl in Hessen and in Siegen. Her father Georg Kurschus (1930–2017) was a Protestant pastor at the Nikolai Church in Siegen. After graduating from high school in Siegen in 1982, she studied medicine for a short time. From 1983 she studied Protestant theology at the universities of Bonn, Marburg, and Münster and at the Wuppertal Ecclesiastical University. She completed her vicariate in Siegen-Eiserfeld.

== Career and position ==
After her vicariate Kurschus became parish priest in Siegen-Klafeld in 1993 and in Siegen-Weidenau in 1999. Since 2001 she was also deputy superintendent of the Evangelical Church District of Siegen. From 2005 to 2012 she held the function of Superintendent of the Protestant Church District of Siegen.

In November 2011 she was elected by the Westphalian regional synod as Praeses of the Protestant Church of Westphalia (EKvW) and was introduced into the function of the leading clergy on 4 March 2012.

Kurschus became a member of the Council of the Protestant Church in Germany and deputy chairwoman of the Council in November 2015. She became commissioner of the EKD Council for relations with the Polish churches in 2016.

On 20 November 2019 Kurschus was confirmed in the function of the Praeses and re-elected for a further term.

On 10 November 2021, Kurschus was elected as the President of the Council of the Protestant Church in Germany.

On 20 November 2023, Kurschus resigned from her positions as the President of the Council of the Protestant Church in Germany and Praeses of the regional Protestant Church of Westphalia after allegations of having attempted to cover up a case of alleged inappropriate sexual behaviour by a church employee some twenty years ago.

== Further functions ==
Kurschus is co-editor of the Protestant magazine chrismon and the Protestant monthly magazine zeitzeichen. She is chairwoman of the board of the Evangelical Press Association and of the supervisory board of the German Bible Society. Furthermore, she is a member of the board of trustees of the Detmold University of Music and since 2020 she is a member of the university council of the University of Münster.

== Award ==
The University of Münster awarded Kurschus an honorary doctorate (Dr. theol. h.c.) on 28 January 2019. She received the award due to her merits concerning the dialogue between religion and society.
