= Evangelical Church of the Palatinate =

United Protestant church in parts of two German states

- Evangelische Kirche der Pfalz (Protestantische Landeskirche)
- Type: Landeskirche, member of the Evangelical Church in Germany
- Classification: Protestant
- Orientation: United Protestant (Lutheran & Reformed)
- Director: Kirchenpräsidentin Dorothee Wüst
- Associations: Union Evangelischer Kirchen
- Region: 5.928 km² in Palatinate (in today's Rhineland-Palatinate, parts of Saarland)
- Headquarters: Speyer, Germany
- Origin: 1818; 1848
- Members: 415.536 (2025); 26,3% of total population
- Official website: https://www.evkirchepfalz.de

The Evangelical Church of the Palatinate (Protestant Regional Church) (Evangelische Kirche der Pfalz (Protestantische Landeskirche)) is a United Protestant church in parts of the German states of Rhineland-Palatinate and Saarland, endorsing both Lutheran and Calvinist orientations.

The seat of the church is in Speyer, where the Protestation at Speyer took place. During this historical event, German Lutheran princes protested the Reichsacht against Martin Luther and called for unhindered spread of the Protestant faith. As the Roman Catholic party urged for religious unity in the Holy Roman Empire, it dismissed all those participants who argued against an Imperial Ban on Luther as "Protestants"; it has since entered various other languages beside German language, and became a dominant term to describe churches coming out of the Reformation, as well as all these derived from them. It is the only EKD member church to formally use the word Protestant (protestantisch in German language) in its name, since most EKD member churches call themselves Evangelical (evangelisch in German language).

It is a full member of the Evangelical Church in Germany (EKD). The current president of the Church ("Kirchenpräsident") is Dorothee Wüst. The Evangelical Church of the Palatinate is one of 20 Lutheran, United Protestant and Reformed churches of the EKD. As of December 2025, the regional church had 415,536 members in 374 parishes.

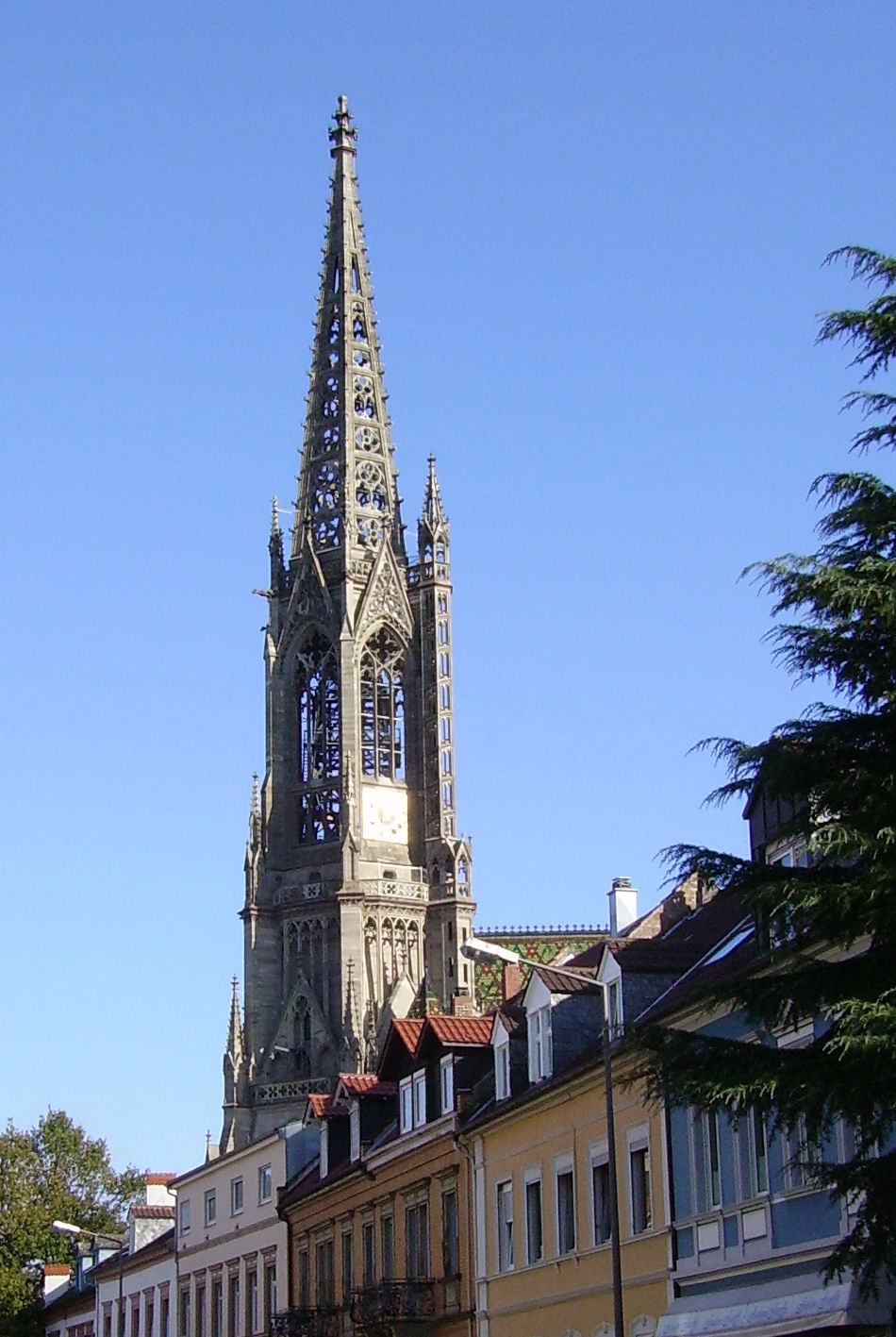
Main church: Gedächtniskirche in Speyer

The Evangelical Church of the Palatinate is a member of the UEK and of the Communion of Protestant Churches in Europe. In Speyer, the church has its own Protestant academy. The principal church is the Gedächtniskirche in Speyer. Because the church has no bishop, it is not a cathedral.

== History ==
Since 1816, the Palatine Reformed and Lutheran congregations were subordinate to the Evangelical Church administration of the Kingdom of Bavaria, of which the then Governorate of the Palatinate formed a part. Following the parishioners' plebiscite in 1817, all Palatine Lutheran and Reformed congregations merged into confessionally united Protestant congregations. In 1848, the Palatine Protestant congregations formed a regional church, then called Vereinigte protestantisch-evangelisch-christliche Kirche der Pfalz (Pfälzische Landeskirche) (i.e. United Protestant Evangelical Christian Church of the Palatinate [Palatine State Church]), independent of that regional church in the rest of Bavaria. In 1922, the United Church of the Palatinate counted 506,000 parishioners.

The official Palatine church body became a destroyed church (German: zerstörte Kirche) since it was taken over by Nazi-submissive German Christians, who gained a majority in the synod by the unconstitutional election imposed by Adolf Hitler on 23 July 1933. Nazi opponents then formed the Confessing Church of the Palatinate. In 1976, the Palatine church renamed into Evangelische Kirche der Pfalz (Protestantische Landeskirche) (i.e. Evangelical Church of the Palatinate [Evangelical State Church]). In 1941 the commander of the CdZ-Gebiet Lothringen subjected the Protestant congregations in that occupation zone of France to the jurisdiction of the United Church of the Palatinate. In 1944 they returned to their previous umbrellas the Reformed Church of Alsace and Lorraine and the Protestant Church of Augsburg Confession of Alsace and Lorraine.

== Practices ==
Ordination of women and blessing of same-sex marriages were allowed.

== Elected leaders ==
The leading person is the "Kirchenpräsident" (Church President), until 1921 titled Konsistorialdirektor (consistorial director), which is elected from the synod for seven years.

- 1886 - 1896: Theodor Michael von Wand, Konsistorialdirektor
- 1896 - 1915: Ludwig von Wagner, Konsistorialdirektor
- 1915 - 1930: D. Dr. Karl Fleischmann, Konsistorialdirektor, since 1921 Kirchenpräsident
- 1930 - 1934: Jakob Kessler, Kirchenpräsident
- 1934 - 1945: Ludwig Diehl,
- 1946 - 1964: Dr. Hans Stempel, Kirchenpräsident
- 1964 - 1969: Dr. Theodor Schaller, Kirchenpräsident
- 1969 - 1975: Walter Ebrecht, Kirchenpräsident
- 1975 - 1988: Heinrich Kron, Kirchenpräsident
- 1988 - 1998: Werner Schramm (Speyer), Kirchenpräsident
- 1998 - 2008: Eberhard Cherdron, Kirchenpräsident
- 2008 - 2021: Christian Schad, Kirchenpräsident
- since 2021: Dorothee Wüst, Kirchenpräsidentin

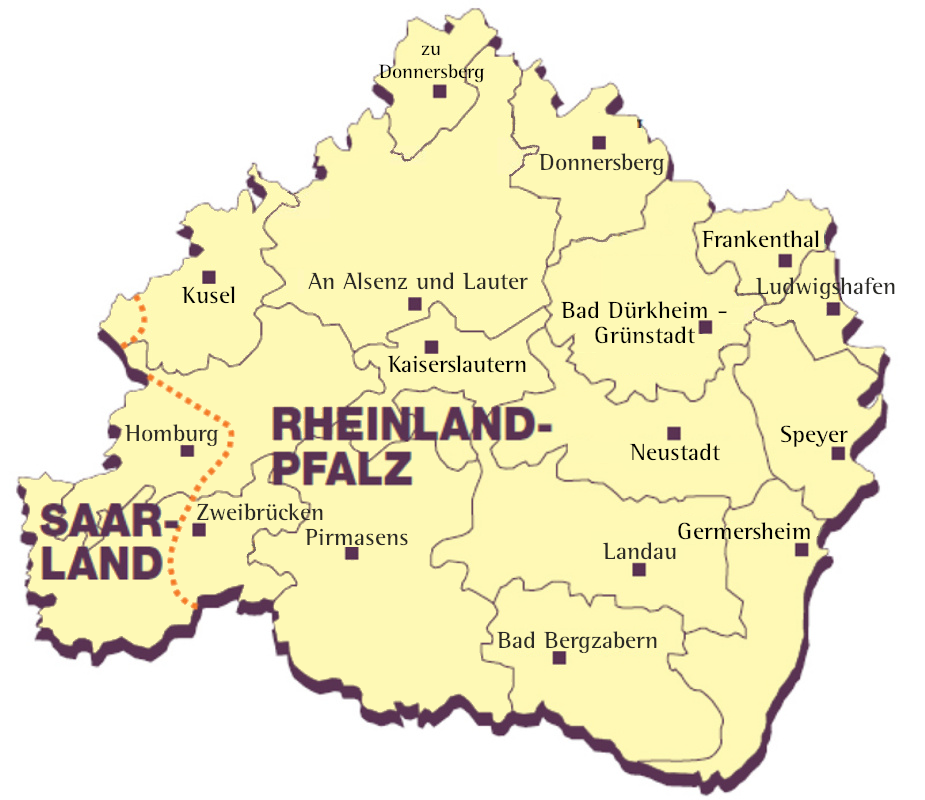
The deaneries in 2017

== Books ==
- Gesangbuch zum gottesdienstlichen Gebrauche für protestantisch-evangelische Christen, Speyer, 1823
- Evangelisch-protestantisches Gesangbuch für Kirche und Haus, Speier
- Gesangbuch für die vereinigte protestantisch-evangelische christliche Kirche der Pfalz, Speyer, 1861 ?
- Evangelisches Kirchen-Gesangbuch - Edition for Vereinigte, protestantisch-evangelische, christliche Kirche der Pfalz, Speyer,
- Evangelisches Gesangbuch, Edition for Evangelische Kirche der Pfalz (Protestantische Landeskirche), Speyer, 1994
