= Evangelical Church in Central Germany =

United church body covering several German states

Coordinates: 50.97960°N 11.02805°E

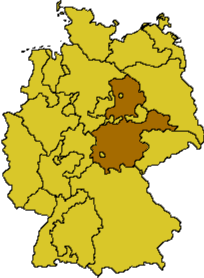
Area covered by the EKM as of 2009

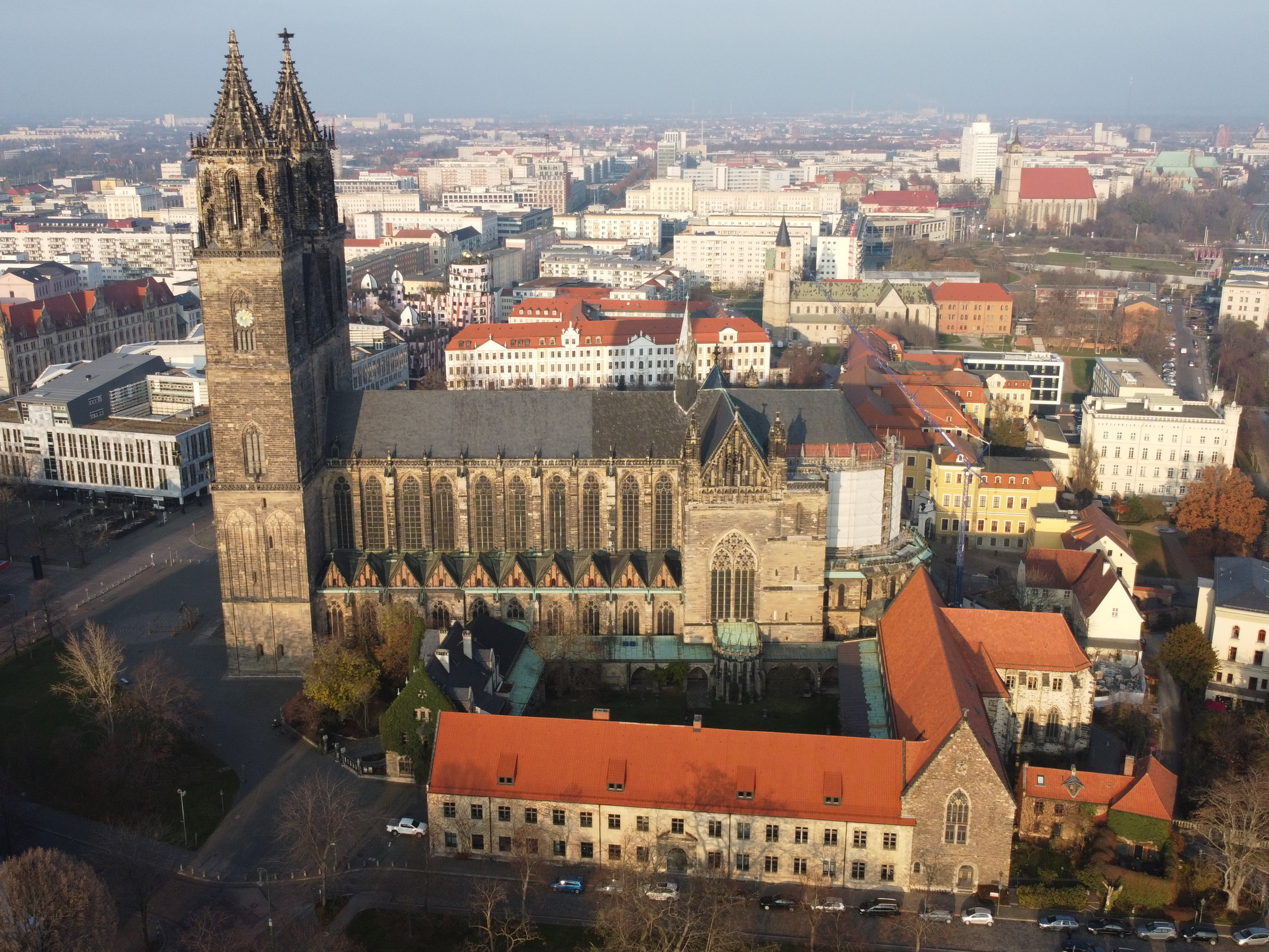
Cathedral Magdeburg

The Evangelical Church in Central Germany (German: Evangelische Kirche in Mitteldeutschland; EKM) is a United church body covering most of the German states of Saxony-Anhalt and Thuringia and some adjacent areas in Brandenburg and Saxony.

== History ==
The Church was formed on 1 January 2009 when the Evangelical Church of the Church Province of Saxony merged with the Evangelical Lutheran Church in Thuringia and became the Evangelical Church in Central Germany. The Church is the most important Christian denomination in Thuringia and Saxony-Anhalt.

The bishop's seat is Magdeburg, the capital of Saxony-Anhalt. The Church is a full member of the federation of Lutheran, Reformed and United Protestant churches in Germany called the Evangelical Church in Germany. Its principal church is Magdeburg Cathedral.

Ilse Junkermann was the Landesbischof (bishop) of the church from 2009 for 10 years. In September 2019, Friedrich Kramer (b. 1964) became her successor.

== Practices ==
Ordination of women and blessing of same-sex marriages are allowed.
