= Evangelical Regional Church in Baden =

United Protestant member church of the Evangelical Church in Germany

Coordinates: 49.0071°N 8.3990°E

Ambit of the Evangelical Regional Church in Baden besides the ambits of other Protestant regional churches in Germany
Basic data
Ambit area:	c. 15,000 km^{2} (5,800 sq mi)
Spiritual leader:	Landesbischöfin; Heike Springhart
Memberships:	EKD (as of 1945), UEK (as of 2004)
Prelatures (Kirchenkreise, led by prelates):	2 (Northern and Southern Baden)
Deaneries (Dekanate/ Kirchenbezirke):	26
Parishes:	by 715 (2011)
Number of parishioners:	945,054 (31.12.2025)
Share of parishioners in the overall population in the ambit:	19.9 % (31.12.2025)
Website:	www.ekiba.de

The Evangelical Regional Church in Baden (German: Evangelische Landeskirche in Baden; i.e. Evangelical Regional Church in Baden) is a United Protestant member church of the Evangelical Church in Germany (EKD), and member of the Conference of Churches on the Rhine (since 1961), which now functions as a regional group of the Communion of Protestant Churches in Europe (CPCE). The Evangelical Regional Church in Baden is a united Protestant church. Its headquarter, the Evangelical Superior Church Council (German: Evangelischer Oberkirchenrat, EOK) is located in Karlsruhe.

The church is not to be confused with the Evangelical Lutheran Church in Baden, based in Karlsruhe as well.

== History ==
In 1821 the Evangelical Regional Church in Baden was founded by uniting Lutheran and Reformed churches in the Grand Duchy of Baden, thus its then name United Evangelical Protestant Church of the Grand Duchy of Baden. The church body comprises only congregations of united Protestant confession. After the grand duchy had become the Republic of Baden in 1918 and after the separation of religion and state by the Weimar Constitution in 1919 the church adopted a new constitution in December 1919 accounting for these changes, renaming as the United Evangelical Protestant Regional Church of Baden (Vereinigte Evangelisch-protestantische Landeskirche Badens). In 1922 the church counted 821,000 parishioners.

Nazi-aligned Protestant activists, emerging from the 1931-founded Nazi Federation of pastors of Baden (NS-Pfarrbund, Gau Baden), candidated for the nominating group called the German Christians and some won already in the ordinary election for synodals and presbyters in late 1932. They still formed a minority in the legislating assembly of the church, the Landessynode. After the Nazi takeover the synodals standing for the nominating group of the Ecclesiastical Liberal Union (Kirchlich-Liberale Vereinigung, KLV) jumped ship and joined the German Christians' faction.

On 1 June 1933, together with the votes of further other sympathisers of the Nazi takeover among the synodals a new majority led by the German Christians voted in a new episcopal church constitution, doing away with most of the say of the Landessynode for the future. Instead the new office of the Landesbischof (i.e. regional bishop) was formed bundling the spiritual, legislative and executive church leadership (before the first was with the prelate, the second with the Landessynode, and the third with the EOK) in the hands of one single man, as typical for the concept of the Führerprinzip, in harsh contradiction to the Protestant tradition of synodal legislation and collegiality in the consistorial executive.

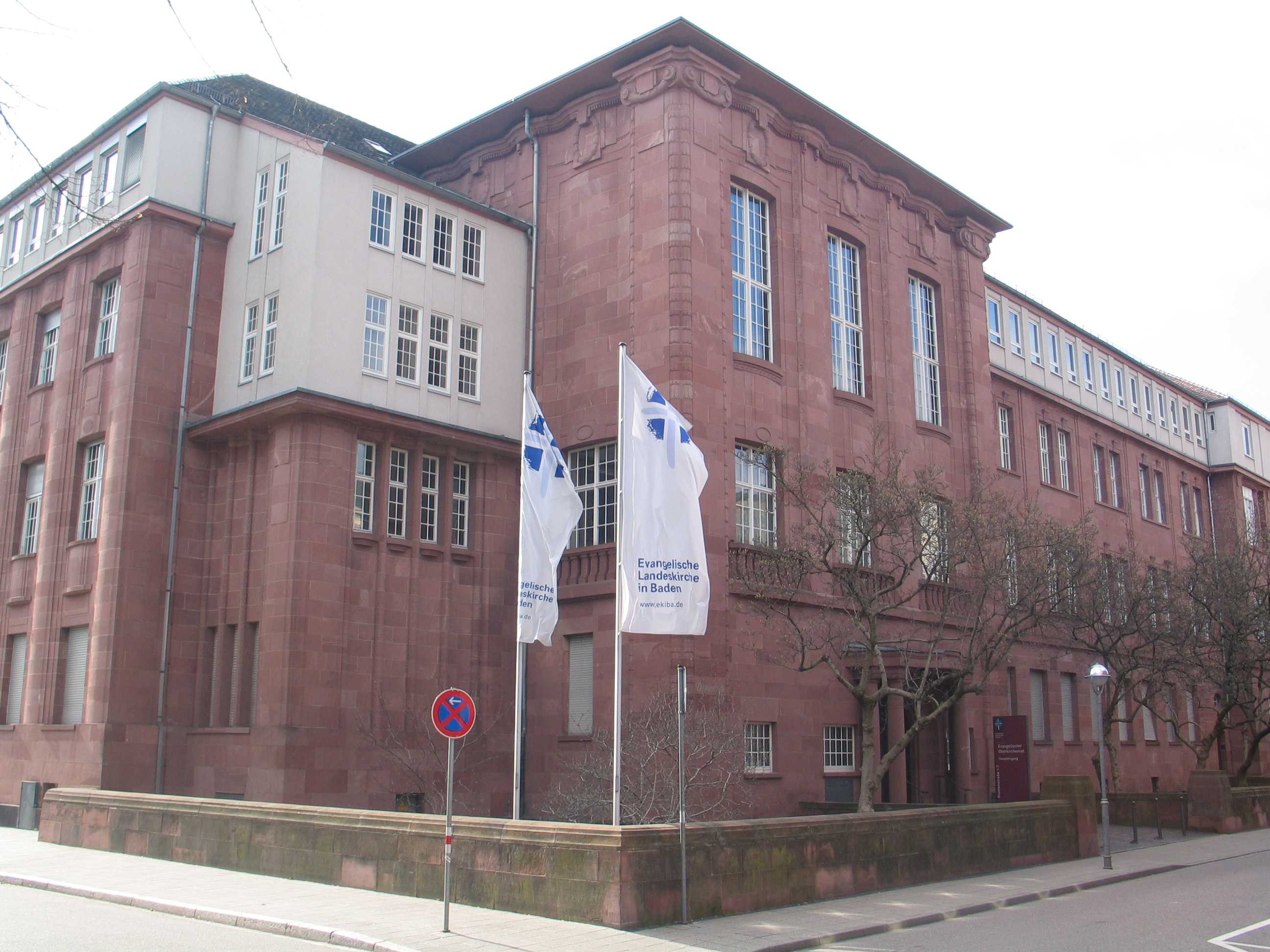
The Evangelical Superior Church Council (EOK) in Karlsruhe.

This adulteration of Evangelical Church governance started the Kirchenkampf (1933–1945; i.e. struggle of the churches) in Baden. On 24 June 1933 the Landessynode elected the incumbent Prelate Julius Kühlewein the new powerful Landesbischof regnant, being ex officio the head of the EOK, downsized in members.

On 23 July 1933, the day of the unconstitutional premature reelection of synodals and presbyters imposed by Hitler, the Nazi-submissive German Christians then gained a majority of 32 seats against the only remaining opposition of 25 members of the conservative Ecclesiastical Positive Association (Kirchlich-Positive Vereinigung, KPV, another nominating group not to be confused with the proponents of the so-called Positive Christianity) in the widely self-disenfranchised Landessynode.

On 5 April 1934 the various opposing church groups merged in the Badischer Bekennerbund (i.e. Baden Covenant of Confessors), the Confessing Church branch in Baden, considering the official church body as a destroyed church (German: zerstörte Kirche), since it had been taken over by Nazi-submissive leaders. Representatives of the Baden Covenant of Confessors participated in the first Reich's Synod of Confession (Reichsbekenntnissynode) and voted in, with others, the Barmen Declaration. On 19 June 1934 the Baden Covenant of Confessors and more intra-church opponents formed the Regional Brethren Council (Landesbruderrat), considered the new parallel church leadership in opposition to the official church led by Kühlewein.

After polling the pastors of the Church of Baden, resulting in a majority of supporters for a merger of the church into the new Protestant Reich Church (478 yeas, against 92 nays, with 18 abstentions and 32 pastors not having answered), on 13 July Kühlewein declared the merger of his church into the new streamlined Reich church. The Baden Confessors protested that self-aggrandising act of Kühlewein. By the end of 1934 Kühlewein changed his mind, and reversed the merger, after the biggest destroyed regional Evangelical Church in Germany, the Evangelical Church of the old-Prussian Union with more than 19 million members, was reestablished as a separate legal entity by a sentence contended by an old-Prussian German Christian faction fighting the authoritative leadership of the old-Prussian Landesbischof, a German Christian too.

This again split Kühlewein's previous supporters in two, those following his new course, and those who did not. When the Reich bishop, claiming leadership over Baden as part of the Reich church, in April 1935 visited his supporters in Baden, he was mostly welcomed by local Nazi party leaders and local German Christians, but completely ignored by any representative of the official Baden church under Kühlewein. In May 1936 Kühlewein in a meeting with the Nazi Gauleiter for Baden, explained that the members of his church clung by 50% to the Confessing Church, 25% were undecided and maximally 25% followed the German Christians. His task would be to protect church members, also when attacked as subversive Confessing Christians by the Nazi government. This shift of behaviour and opinion opened the way for reconciliation of many Baden Confessors with the official church leader. In 1937 Kühlewein joined with the Baden church the moderately Nazi-opposing block of the so-called intact regional Lutheran churches, to wit Bavaria, Hanover, and neighbouring Württemberg.

In order to suppress the Confessing Church in Baden, now obviously not fought anymore by Kühlewein, the Nazi Reich government decided to block the Baden Confessors by draining their access to any finances. To this end, on 25 May 1938 the decree with the euphemising title Law on the Wealth Formation within the Regional Evangelical Churches, passed on 11 March 1935 and then already applied to Regional churches within Prussia, was also implemented in Baden. So any offertory, to-be-collected, all budgets, remittances and payments by any entity of the church, were subject to approval by government-appointed comptrollers. This caused an outrage of pastors, rallying for public demonstrations, and a sharp protest by Kühlewein, backing the demonstrators, but in vain.

After the government waged war on Poland and thus started the Second World War, male members of the Confessing Church were preferently drafted for the army. Hanns Kerrl demanded to calm down the struggle of the churches, since the Wehrmacht wanted no activities against pastors of the Confessing Church during the war. So the Gestapo concentrated on pastors of the Confessing Church, who were not drafted. In January 1940, urged by the Wehrmacht, Hitler repeated that no wide-ranging actions against the Confessing Church are to be taken, so that the Gestapo returned to selective forms of repression.

After Kühlewein had resigned after the war, in November 1945, on the first Landessynode convened after the World War II, Julius Bender, a proponent of the Confessing Church, was elected the new Landesbischof. After the war a movement developed within a number of regional Protestant churches promoting constitutional changes drawing lessons from the vulnerability of their churches and its staff for giving way to state pressure. Synodalism was strengthened and the separation of religion and state was reinforced in a number of church renamings from the church of a certain nation, to the church of a certain denomination within a certain nation. So on 1 July 1957 the present name, "Evangelical Regional Church in Baden" replaced the former naming "United Evangelical Protestant Regional Church of Baden".

== Practices ==
Ordination of women and blessing of same-sex marriages were allowed.

== Bishops ==
- 1819–1826: Johann Peter Hebel
- 1826–1828: Johannes Bähr
- 1829–1853: Ludwig Hüffell
- 1853–1861: Carl Christian Ullmann
- 1861–1877: Karl Julius Holtzmann
- 1877–1895: Karl Wilhelm Doll
- 1895–1900: Friedrich Wilhelm Schmidt
- 1900–1903: Albert Helbing
- 1904–1909: Friedrich Karl Oehler
- 1909–1924: Ludwig Schmitthenner
- 1924–1945: Julius Kühlewein
- 1945–1964: Julius Bender
- 1964–1980: Hans Heidland
- 1980–1998: Klaus Engelhardt
- 1998–2014: Ulrich Fischer
- 2014-2022: Jochen Cornelius-Bundschuh
- since April 2022: Heike Springhart
