= Antoine Pfeiffer =

French reformist pastor (1940–2021)

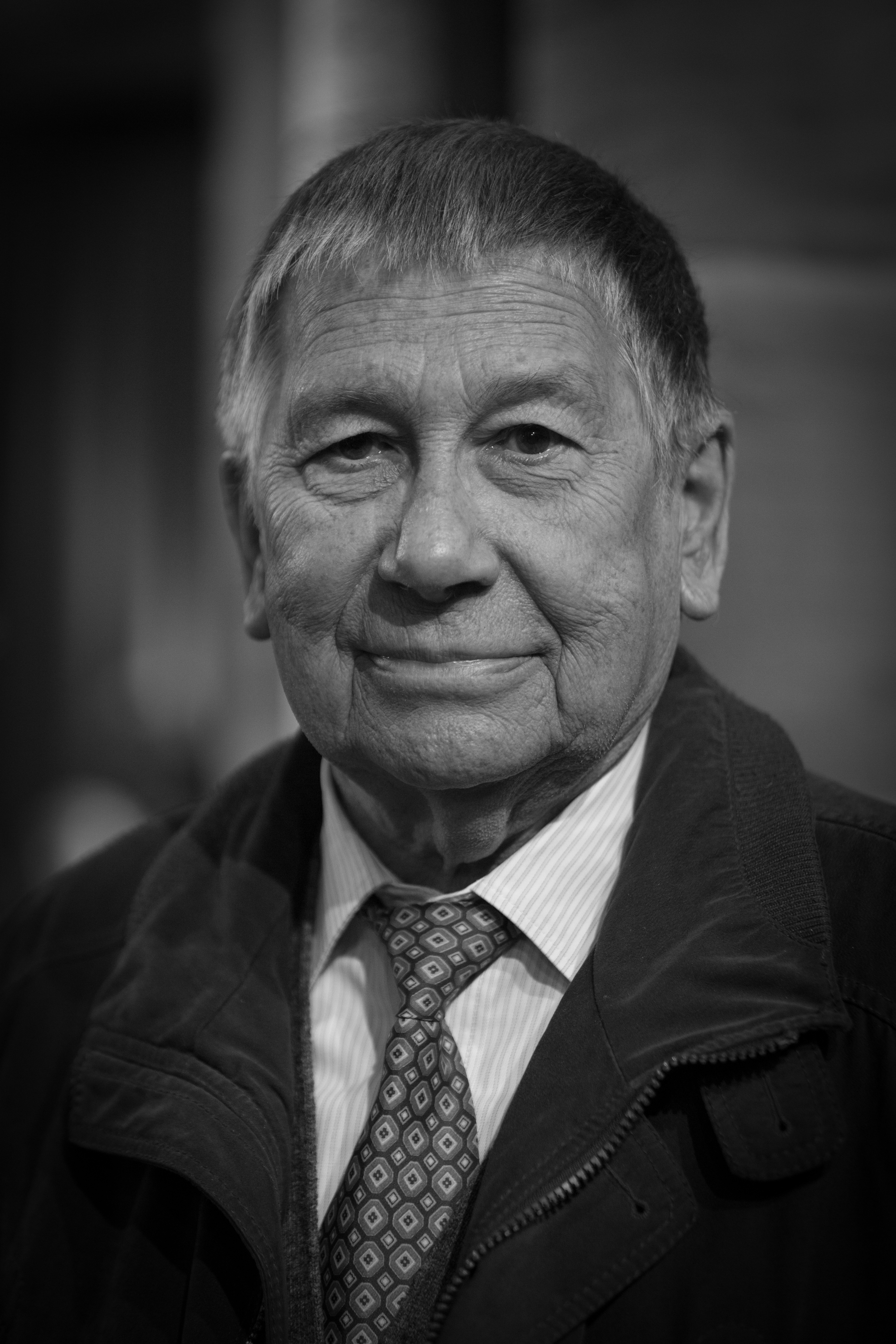
- Pfeiffer in 2015
- Born: 27 February 1940; Périgueux, France
- Died: 25 February 2021 (aged 80); Strasbourg, France
- Occupation: Pastor

Antoine Pfeiffer (27 February 1940 – 25 February 2021) was a French reformist pastor. He served as President of the Protestant Reformed Church of Alsace and Lorraine from 1988 to 2000 and was a member of the Communauté d'Églises en mission.

== Biography ==
Born in Périgueux, Pfeiffer's family evacuated to the south of France just before World War II. He was the son of accountant Germain Pfeiffer and Marguerite Brunner. His family returned to Alsace after the war and he studied in Saint-Louis and Mulhouse. He then became a Sunday school teacher and organized summer camps. He also took classes for laypeople at the Faculté de théologie protestante de Strasbourg, where he obtained a certificate in theology in 1964. He became a trainee pastor at the Église réformée du Bouclier in 1968 before becoming a pastor at the Église réformée de Bischwiller. He became head pastor of the Église réformée du Bouclier in 1976.

In 1982, Pfeiffer was elected to the executive council of the Protestant Reformed Church of Alsace and Lorraine. He then succeeded Thérèse Klipffel as president in 1988, serving four terms until 2000. After his term, he helped assemble the Union of Protestant Churches of Alsace and Lorraine. He was also a member of the Communauté évangélique d'action apostolique, a partnership between churches in the Global North and Global South.

In 1998, Pfeiffer was a representative and consultant to Strasbourg Mayor Roland Ries on the issue of the Strasbourg Mosque. On 14 May of that year, as President of the Protestant Reformed Church of Alsace and Lorraine, he signed a statement in support of the mosque's construction alongside Catholic Archbishop of Strasbourg Joseph Doré, Chief Rabbi of Strasbourg René Gutman, and director of the Protestant Church of the Augsburg Confession of Alsace and Lorraine Marc Lienhard.

Antoine Pfeiffer died in Strasbourg on 25 February 2021, two days shy of his 81st birthday.

== Publications ==
- Protestants d'Alsace et de Moselle. Lieux de mémoire et de vie (2006)
