= Jean Tartier =

French Protestant pastor (1942–2025)

Co-President of the Dombes Group
- In office 2000–2014
- Preceded by: Alain Blancy
- Succeeded by: Jacques-Noël Pérès

President of the Protestant Federation of France
- In office 1997–1999
- Preceded by: Jacques Stewart
- Succeeded by: Jean-Arnold de Clermont

Personal details
- Born: 22 February 1942; La Voulte-sur-Rhône, France
- Died: 17 July 2025 (aged 83)
- Education: Faculté de théologie protestante de Strasbourg
- Occupation: Pastor

Jean Tartier (French: [ʒɑ̃ taʁtje]; 22 February 1942 – 17 July 2025) was a French Protestant pastor.

== Biography ==
Born on 22 February 1942 in La Voulte-sur-Rhône, Tartier was the son of pastor Roland Tartier and nurse Madeleine Tissot. He attended secondary school in Montbéliard before earning a master's degree in theology from the Faculté de théologie protestante de Strasbourg. He was named a pastor in the Evangelical Lutheran Church in France and served as ecclesiastical inspector of Montbéliard from 1977 to 1992. He was elected to succeed Jacques Stewart as president of the Protestant Federation of France on 21 September 1996. He took office in 1997 and was succeeded by Jean-Arnold de Clermont in 1999. He was criticized for his lack of an official platform on the civil solidarity pact, passed by the National Assembly in 1999. He then served as co-president of the Dombes Group from 2000 to 2014.

Jean Tartier died on 17 July 2025, at the age of 83.
