= Conference of Churches on the Rhine =

The Conference of Churches on the Rhine (German: Konferenz der Kirchen am Rhein (KKR); French: Conférence des églises riveraines du Rhin) is an ecumenical organization of European Christians founded in 1961. It is a member of the World Council of Churches and a grouping within the Communion of Protestant Churches in Europe. It includes churches in Germany, France, Austria, Liechtenstein, Luxembourg, and Switzerland. Its members include:

- Evangelical Church of the Augsburg Confession in Austria
- Evangelical Church of the Palatinate
- Evangelical Church in Baden
- Evangelical-Lutheran Church in Württemberg
- Evangelical Church in the Rhineland
- Evangelical Church in Germany
- Evangelical Church of the Canton of Thurgau
- Evangelical Reformed Church of the Canton Basel-Landschaft
- Evangelical-Reformed Church of the Canton Basel-Stadt
- Evangelical Reformed Church of the Canton of Schaffhausen
- Evangelical Reformed Church of the Canton of St. Gallen
- Evangelical Reformed Church of the Canton of Zürich
- Federation of Swiss Protestant Churches
- Protestant Church in Baden
- Protestant Church in Hesse and Nassau
- Protestant Church of Augsburg Confession of Alsace and Lorraine
- Protestant Church in the Netherlands
- Protestant Federation of France
- Protestant Reformed Church of Alsace and Lorraine
- Reformed Church of Aargau
