= French Confession of Faith =

French Protestant Reformed statement of faith

The French Confession of Faith (Latin: Confessio Gallicana, French: Confession de La Rochelle), also known as the Gallic Confession or the Confession of La Rochelle, is a Reformed confession of faith. The Confession was adopted at the first Reformed national synod in 1559. It is currently the official doctrinal standard of the Evangelical Reformed Churches of France and was also the standard of the Reformed Church of France before its merger with the Lutheran church.

== Background ==
Initially, the French Reformed Protestants, also called Huguenots, had neither an official creed nor centralised organisation. A brief statement of doctrinal principles ("biblical truths") was included in their editions of the Bible, the translation and publication of which was undertaken by Protestants in the middle of the 16th century. In 1534, Jacques Lefèvre d'Étaples published a French translation of the New Testament. In 1552, Robert Estienne published the Bible and New Testament in Latin, and in 1553, J. Gerard published a French translation of the Bible.

After the Peace of Augsburg (1555), Reformed congregations no longer needed to operate underground and thus grew to around 400,000 members. They organised in various parts of France between 1555 and 1558 with formal organisation and regular services. The need for a single, centralised church organisation and common confessional document arose. In 1558, doctrinal differences arose among the Reformed churches of Poitiers, leading a visiting Parisian pastor, Antoine de la Roche Chandieu (1534–1591), to propose the convening of a synod with the intention of producing a common confession and book of discipline upon his return to Paris. In 1559, the first national French Reformed synod met in Paris, at which the two documents were produced.

All this activity took place in conditions of strict secrecy. As early as 1555, Henry II issued an edict which mandated the death penalty for all those guilty of heresy, threatening the Huguenots with burning at the stake. After the conclusion of the Italian Wars with the Peace of Cateau-Cambrésis in March–April 1559, the king set about eradicating heresy with particular zeal. In 1559, a special commission (Chambre ardente) was established in each parlement to monitor the execution of the edicts on heretics. Nevertheless, on May 25–28, 1559, the first national Synod of the Reformed Church of France was held in Paris under the chairmanship of the pastor of the Parisian congregation, Jean Morel, a student and friend of John Calvin. The exact number of delegates to the synod is unknown.

== Development ==
The Confession was based on a statement of faith sent by the Reformed churches of France to John Calvin in 1557 during a period of persecution. Working from this, and probably with the help of Theodore Beza and Pierre Viret, Calvin and his pupil Antoine de la Roche Chandieu wrote a confession in French for them in the form of thirty-five articles. The Confession was to be presented with a letter to the King Charles IX of France that vindicated their principles.

When persecution subsided, twenty delegates representing seventy-two churches met secretly in Paris from 23 to 27 May 1559. With François de Morel as moderator, the delegates produced a Constitution of Ecclesiastical Discipline and a Confession of Faith. Calvin's thirty-five articles were used in the Confession but were revised and extended to forty articles (the first two articles were expanded to six articles).

== Content ==
The Confession begins with the subtitle "Confession of Faith, made in one accord by the French people, who desire to live according to the purity of the Gospel of our Lord Jesus Christ. A.D. 1559." Each article is accompanied by references to the Bible. The structure is similar to Calvin's Institutes of the Christian Religion (1559) and Genevan Catechism (1542/1545), being divided into the following four sections.

1. God
2. Christ
3. Holy Spirit
4. Church
- Articles 1–2 open the first section, dealing with the nature of God (his attributes including eternity, unchangeableness, omnipotence, etc.) and his revelation to man, first in the works of creation and then in Scripture.
- Articles 3–5 are devoted to Scripture, which is called the true Word of God and considered the sole rule of faith. The Holy Spirit enables believers to distinguish canonical from non-canonical books. Article 5 confesses the Apostles', Athanasian and Nicene Creeds to be 'in accordance with the Word of God'.
- Article 6 confesses the doctrine of three divine hypostases of the one divine essence: God the Father, the first cause, the basis and the source of all that exists; God the Son, his eternal Word of Wisdom, eternally begotten by the Father; God the Holy Spirit, his energy and power, proceeding from the Father and the Son. This article rejects all heresies and sects condemned by the "holy doctors, such as St. Hilary, St. Athanasius, St. Ambrose, and St. Cyril.'
- Article 7 states that the Triune God created all things visible and invisible.
- Article 8 states that God ordains all that happens in the world, without being the author of evil, but rather turning the evil which is done by sinners into good.
- Article 9 opens the second section on sin and redemption. It says that man was created perfect, but due to the Fall became subject to original sin. Articles 10–11 state that all descendants of Adam are 'in the bondage to original sin,' and “even little children in the mother's womb' are not free from it. Baptism does not take away sin, but by God’s grace the imputation of sin is cancelled.
- Article 12 states that God, according to his eternal and unchangeable purpose, before the creation of the world, predestined some to salvation in the Lord Jesus Christ, regardless of their merits, but only by his Grace, and others to condemnation, in order to 'show in them his justice” (this doctrine of predestination clearly distinguishes the Reformed faith from other forms of Protestantism).
- Article 13 states that Jesus Christ is all that is necessary for our salvation. Article 14 continues that in Jesus Christ two natures were united—divine and human. He became a man like us, but there was no sin in him. This same article rejects all ancient heresies concerning the person of Christ, and especially the heresy of Michael Servetus, who denied the divine nature in Jesus Christ. Article 15 discusses in detail the two natures of Christ in one hypostasis.
- Articles 16–17 state that through Christ's sacrifice on the cross alone, we have been reconciled with God and have received forgiveness of sins.
- Articles 18–20 emphasise that justification is based on Christ's atoning sacrifice, without any merit on our part, and is given to us by faith alone.
- Articles 21–22 continue that by this faith we are renewed and receive a special gift to live a holy life in the Holy Spirit. Faith necessarily produces good works, but these good works are not counted towards our righteousness, which rests solely on the atoning sacrifice of Christ.
- Articles 23–24 state that Christ is our only intercessor before God the Father. Christ is the fulfilment of the law; other ways of salvation are to be rejected. On this basis, the French Confession rejects the intercession of the saints and everything that, from the Reformed point of view, detracts from the all-sufficiency of the sacrifice of Jesus Christ, namely: purgatory, monastic vows, pilgrimages, fasts, secret confession and indulgences.
- Articles 25–28 begin the third and fourth sections, on the work of the Holy Spirit in the Church and Sacrament as well as the institutions of the Church itself. Here, the idea is developed that the Church with its ministry and preaching of the Word of God is a divine institution. The Church is to be respected and obeyed. The true Church is a community of believers who live according to the Word of God and strive for holiness. Although hypocrites and immoral people may appear in the Church, they are not capable of staining the Church. Having rejected the 'papacy' for its many superstitions, idolatry, and distortions of the Word and Sacraments, the Confession states that traces of the true Church remained in the papacy thanks to the power and efficacy of baptism, which does not depend on the faith of the one who ministers it. Therefore, those baptised Roman Catholic do not need re-baptism.
- Articles 29–33 constitute the fourth section, concerning the institutions of the Church. The true Church must be governed by pastors, overseers and deacons. True pastors must be lawfully elected, and have equal authority and power among one another and are subject to one universal bishop, Jesus Christ. No Church can claim dominion over another Church.
- Articles 34–38 are devoted to the sacraments, which complement the Word and are defined as 'pledges and seals of the grace of God, and by this means aid and comfort our faith'. They are outward signs through which God works by the power of His Spirit. There are two sacraments: baptism and the Lord's Supper, rather than seven as in the Roman Catholic view. Baptism is the seal of our adoption, through which we are 'grafted into the body of Christ' to be cleansed by His blood and renewed by the Holy Spirit. The Lord's Supper is a testimony of our union with Christ, who truly nourishes us with his 'body' and 'blood' through the 'secret and incomprehensible powe'r of the Holy Spirit. But this is accomplished 'spiritually' by faith. He who approaches the throne of the Lord with true faith receives the body and blood of Christ, which nourish the soul no less than bread and wine nourish the body. There is no literal presence of God in the eucharistic elements, as the 'papists' claim.
- Articles 39–40 points to the necessity of obedience to civil authorities, which was established by God to keep the peace and to oppose sin and heresy. God created kingdoms, republics, and other forms of government, both hereditary and elected, so that peace and order would reign in society. God put a sword in the hands of judges so that they would punish crimes against the first and second commandments of the Decalogue . Therefore, everyone must obey judges, willingly and voluntarily pay taxes, even if the rulers are unbelievers. Those who resist the authorities commit unlawful acts and violate the law and order and are therefore subject to condemnation

== Reception ==
On 10 July 1559, Henry II died in Paris. In 1560, the Confession was presented in Amboise to the new king of France, Francis II. A preface was added to the document—an request for the king to cease the persecution of Protestants. However, on 5 December 1560, the king, who had not yet reached the age of 17, suddenly died in Orléans. A year later, in 1561, Theodore Beza introduced the Confession to the new king of France, Charles IX, at a religious conference in Poitiers. A few years later, the Confession received approval in Germany, and was recognised by German synods at Wesel (Westphalia) in 1568 and Emden (Lower Saxony) in 1571.

The Piedmontese Waldensians, who had already affiliated themselves with the Reformed churches in 1532, presented the French Confession as their own confession of faith to the Duke of Savoy in 1560. The 1655 shortened and revised form of the French Confession is still considered a confession of faith of the Waldensians today.

The Belgic Confession (1561) is closely related to the French Confession; the author Guido de Brès closely followed and replicated the order of doctrines in his confession.

In 1571, the seventh national synod of the French Reformed churches was held at La Rochelle, which had become the center of the French Reformation. Among the honored guests present were Jeanne III, Queen of Navarre, her son Henry of Navarre (later King Henry IV), Prince Louis of Condé, Admiral Gaspard Coligny and other high-ranking French Huguenots. The text of the French Confession was read to all the representatives of the congregations and guests present at the synod, and then signed by them. After this solemn procedure, the Gallican Confession received a second name—the Confession of La Rochelle.

Notable participants of the seventh national synod at La Rochelle (1571)

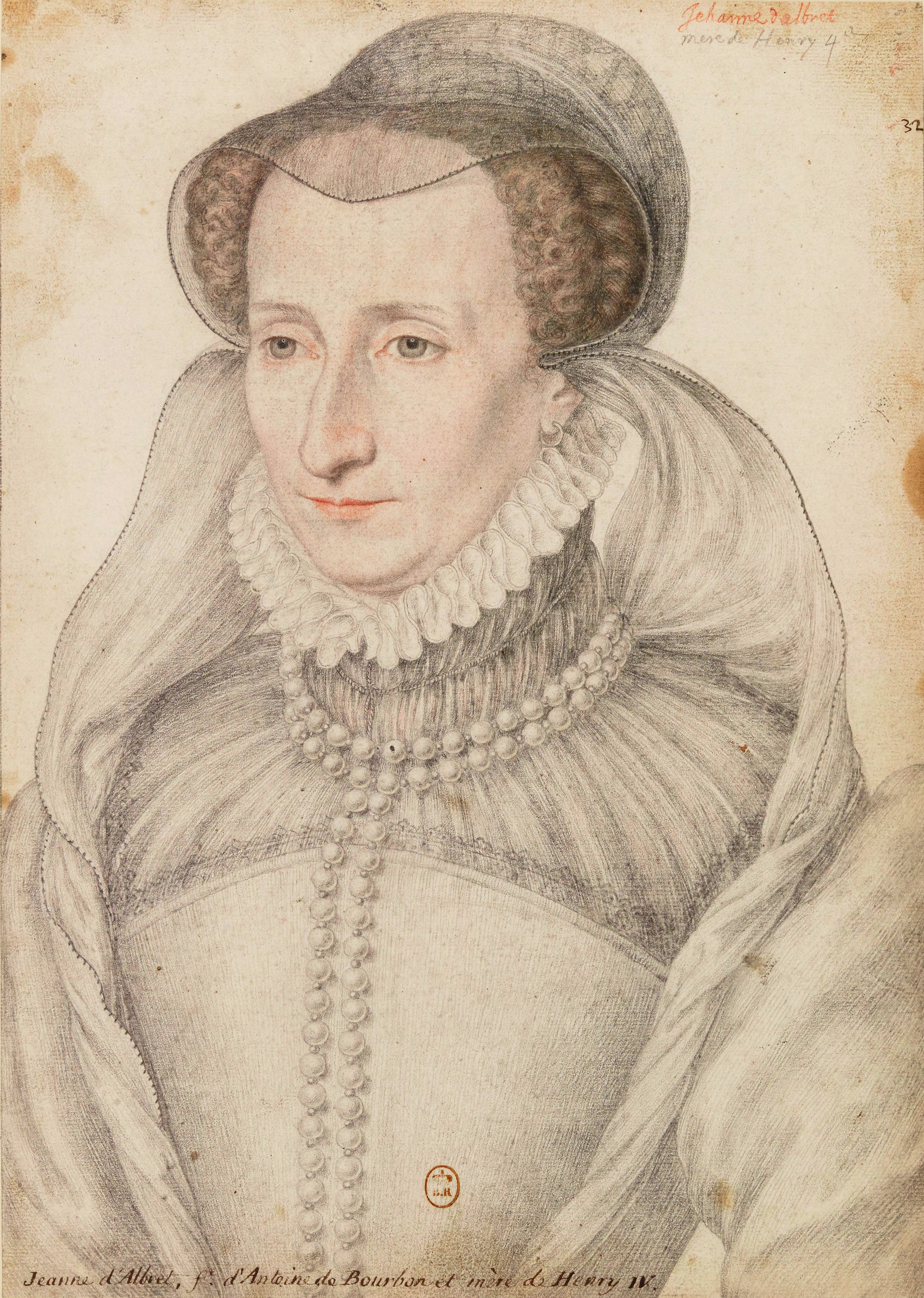
Jeanne III, Queen of Navarre
(1528–1572)

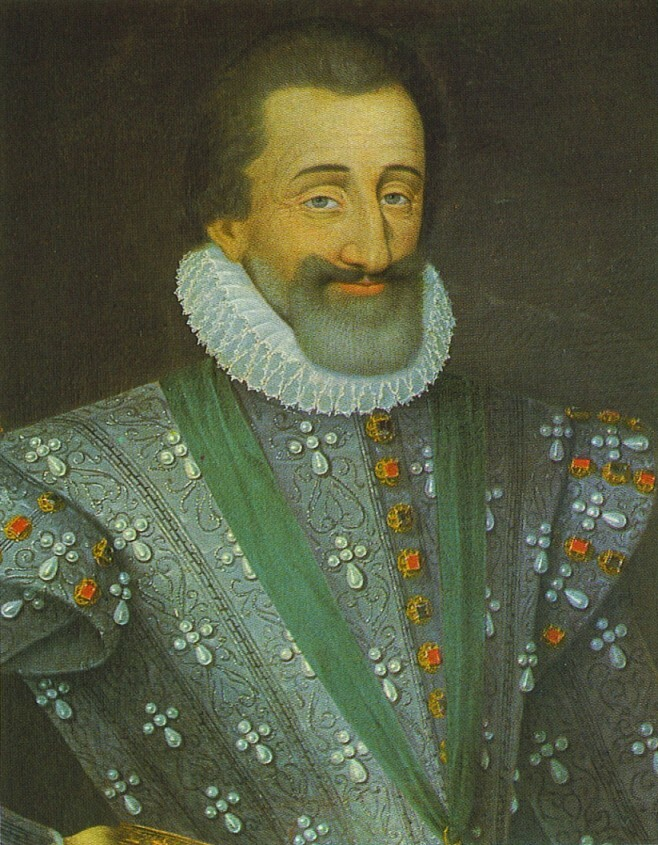
Henry of Navarre
(1553–1610)
King of France (1589–1610)

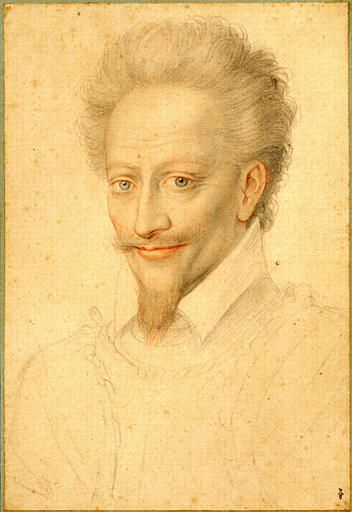
Henry I of Bourdon, second prince of Condé
(1552–1588)

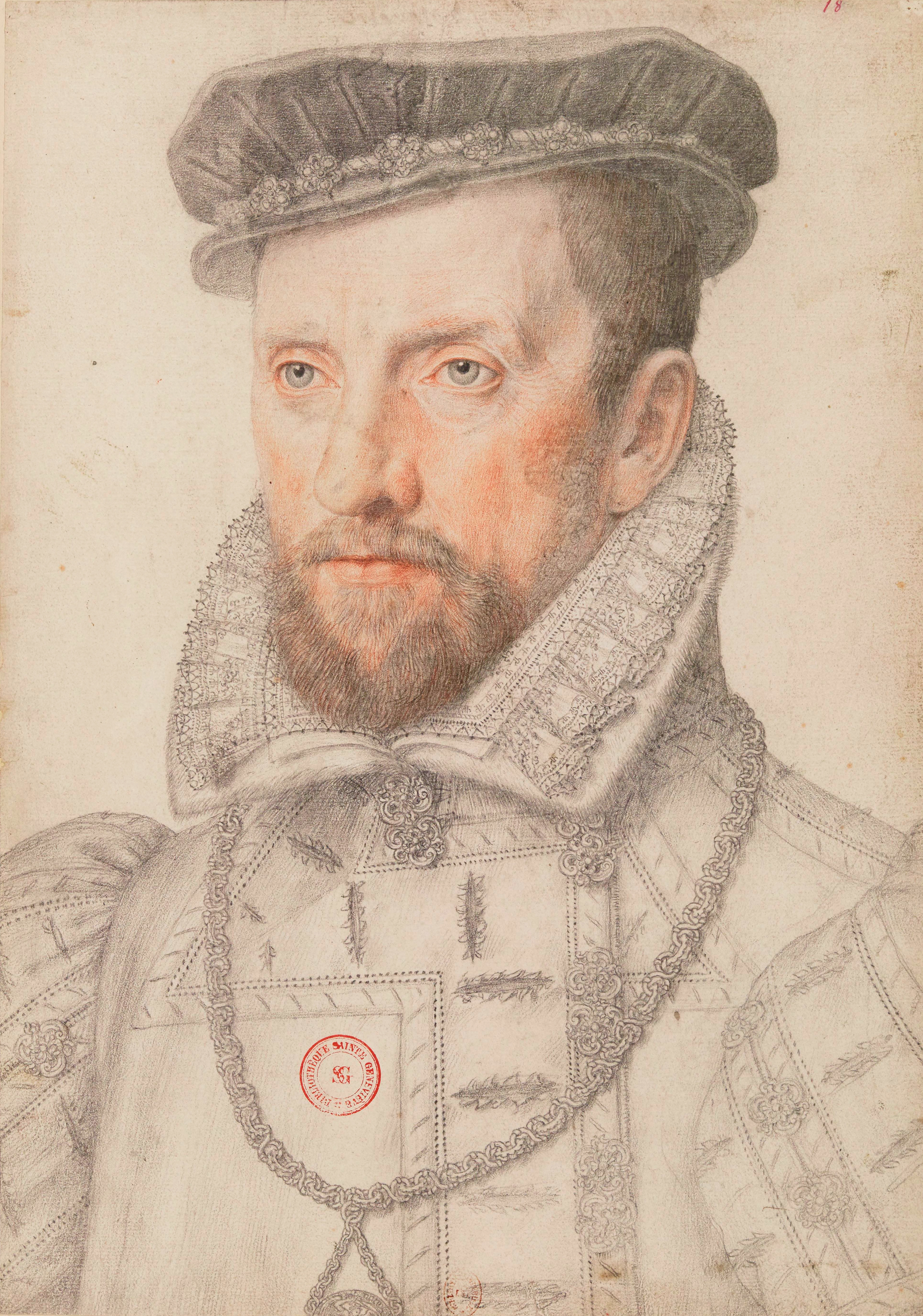
Gaspard II of Coligny
(1519–1572)
Assassinated on St. Bartholomew's Day

The Confession remained significant in the Reformed Church of France until the 19th century.
