= Laurent Schlumberger =

French Protestant leader

Laurent Schlumberger (French pronunciation: [loʁɑ̃ ʃlœ̃bɛʁʒe]; born 1957) has been the first President of the United Protestant Church of France from 2013 to 2017.

== Life ==
Schlumberger exercised his pastoral ministry in the Paris region in Asnières-sur-Seine - Bois-Colombes (Hauts-de-Seine), then Nantes and Laval. He was elected president of the West region of the Regional Council of the Reformed Church of France in 1997. In 2006 he became pastor of the Foyer de Grenelle (15th district of Paris), a fellowship of evangelical popular Mission which is a component the Protestant Federation of France. He was elected to the Reformed Church of France National Council of which he is vice-president from 1995 to 1998.

In 2010, he was elected president of the National Council of the Reformed Church of France. It participates in the process of union of the two main French historic Protestant Churches, the Reformed Church of France and the Evangelical Lutheran Church of France in 2013, under the name of United Protestant Church of France. He became president of the new ecclesial structure that date.

He married Sophie Schlumberger, pastor and Biblical scholar.

== Distinction ==
2017: Knight of the Legion of Honor

== Bibliography ==
- Devant Dieu. Éléments d'un catéchisme théologique pour les adolescents, Paris, SED, 1995
- Dieu, l'absence et la clarté. Essai sur la pertinence du protestantisme, Lyon, éditions Olivétan, 2004
- Sur le seuil. Les protestants au défi du témoignage, Lyon, Olivétan, 2005
- A l’Église qui vient, Lyon, Olivétan, 2017
- Du zapping à la rencontre. Mobilités contemporaines et mobile de Dieu, Lyon, Olivétan, 2018

== Sources ==
- Élection de Laurent Schlumberger à la présidence du Conseil national de l’Église protestante unie, La Vie, 15 mai 2013
- Document de présentation de Laurent Schlumberger sur le site de la Fédération protestante de France
- Entretien avec Laurent Schlumberger, Antoine Nouis, «Choisir la confiance». Journal Réforme, n°3541, 19/12/2013.

== See also ==
- Protestantism
- Lutheranism
