= National Union of Protestant Reformed Evangelical Churches of France =

The National Union of Protestant Reformed Evangelical Churches of France (French: Union nationale des Églises protestantes réformées évangéliques de France, abbr. UNEPREF), better known as the Evangelical Reformed Churches of France, is a Calvinist denomination in France. It has currently around 10,600 members spread over 68 churches, predominant in the Paris area, the southwest, and the southeast of France.

== History ==
The Evangelical Reformed Churches of France was founded in 1938 as the continuation of the Evangelical Reformed Church of France.

Led by pastor Marc Boegner, parts of four Protestant denominations of France merged into the Reformed Church of France in 1938: the Evangelical Reformed Church of France (a majority); the Union of Reformed Churches (completely); the Free Evangelical Churches (a minority); and the Methodist Church of France (a majority). A minority of more conservative churches in the Evangelical Reformed Church of France were opposed to theological liberalism, and therefore, continued their current denomination under the name National Union of Independent Reformed Evangelical Churches of France (EREI or UNEREI) with the emphasis on 'independent'.

In March 2009, the denomination changed its name to National Union of Protestant Reformed Evangelical Churches of France (UNEPREF). Local churches, however, are still referred to as 'evangelical Calvinist churches'.

On June 20, 2024 the denomination entered into a fraternal relationship with the EPC.

== Beliefs ==
The Evangelical Reformed Churches of France adhere the Apostles' Creed and the Nicene Creed. In addition, they adhere to the Calvinist French Confession of Faith of La Rochelle (1559) and the Confession of Faith of the French Reformed Church (version 1872).

== Organization and structure ==
The denomination is organised according to the presbyterian model. Each church sends representatives to the national synod, held annually. Once every three years, the general national synod convenes and elects its president (currently pastor Jean-Raymond Stauffacher).

The church has strong links with the theological seminary Faculté Jean Calvin (formerly: Faculté Libre de Théologie Réformée) in Aix-en-Provence. The majority of its pastors are educated here.

Within France, UNEPREF participates in the Protestant Federation of France, the Protestant Missionary Service, the Protestant Lutheran-reformed communion (affiliation only), and the French national council of evangelicals.

Internationally, it is a member of the World Communion of Reformed Churches and the Community of Churches with a Mission. In addition, it maintains many relations with Presbyterian churches in the US and elsewhere in Europe.

== See also ==
- Reformed Church of France (former Reformed Church of France, merged in 2013)
- United Protestant Church of France
- Protestant Reformed Church of Alsace and Lorraine (former Calvinist church, merged in 2006)
