= Jacques Maury =

French pastor (1920–2020)

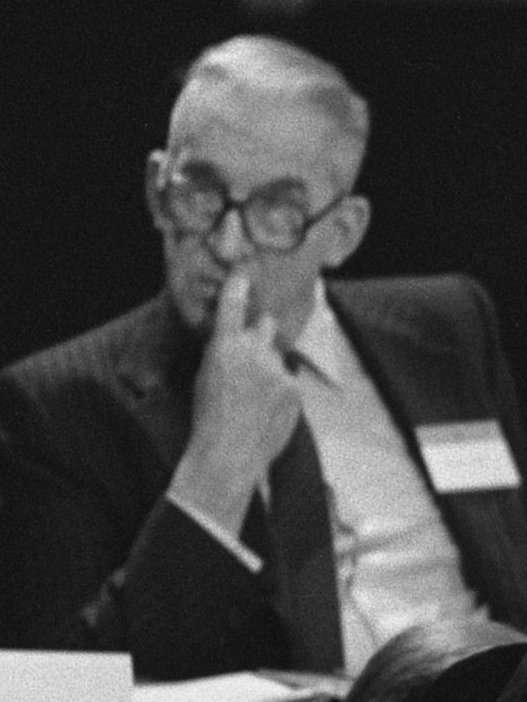
- Maury in 1981
- Born: 10 November 1920; Clamart, France
- Died: 12 April 2020 (aged 99); Clichy, France
- Occupation: Pastor

Jacques Maury (10 November 1920 – 12 April 2020) was a French pastor.

== Biography ==
Jacques was the son of Pierre Maury, a dogmatic professor at the Protestant Faculty of Theology in Paris. Pierre Maury introduced the ideas of Karl Barth in France. Maury's grandfather was Léon Maury, a professor at the Protestant Faculty of Theology in Montauban.

Maury attended the Faculté de théologie protestante in Montpellier. During World War II, he worked for Cimade at the Camp de Rivesaltes and as an assistant military chaplain in the 2nd Armored Division.

Maury became pastor of the Reformed Church in Lezay after the war. He was President of the French Federation of Christian Student Associations from 1957 to 1962, and then pastor at the Reformed Church in Poitiers. He developed ecumenical relations with the Catholics.

In 1968, Maury was elected President of the Reformed Church of France, then President of the Protestant Federation of France in 1977. He left this position in 1987, and was elected President of Cimade in 1989, serving until 1995. From 1981 to 1990, he chaired working group between the World Council of Churches and the Pontifical Council for Promoting Christian Unity.

Jacques Maury died on Easter Sunday, 12 April 2020 in Clichy at the age of 99.

== Decorations ==
- Officer of the Legion of Honour (1995)
