= United Protestant Church of France =

Largest Protestant church in France, est. 2013

- Église protestante unie de France
- Classification: Protestant
- Orientation: Calvinist and Lutheran
- President: Christian Baccuet
- Associations: WCRC, LWF, FPF, WCC, CPCE
- Region: France (except Alsace and Moselle)
- Origin: 2013
- Merger of: Reformed Church of France; Evangelical Lutheran Church of France
- Congregations: 1,000
- Members: 250,000
- Ministers: 456
- Official website: epudf.org

The United Protestant Church of France (French: Église protestante unie de France) is the main and largest Protestant church in France.

== History ==
It was created in 2013 through the unification of the Reformed Church of France and the Evangelical Lutheran Church of France. It is active in all parts of Metropolitan France apart from Alsace and Moselle, where the Union of Protestant Churches of Alsace and Lorraine is established, mainly in that it incorporates both kinds of parishes throughout the country.

According to a Church census, by 2025 it will have 1,000 places of worship and 250,000 participants.

== Beliefs ==
Ordination of women is allowed.

The church believes abortion may be allowable under certain circumstances.

=== Marriage ===
A 2015 resolution allows blessings of same-sex marriage.

== See also ==
- Huguenots
- National Union of Independent Reformed Evangelical Churches of France
- Protestant Federation of France
- Temple of the Holy Spirit, Besançon
- Union of Protestant Churches of Alsace and Lorraine
  - Protestant Church of Augsburg Confession of Alsace and Lorraine
  - Protestant Reformed Church of Alsace and Lorraine
