= Evangelical-Reformed Church of the Canton Basel-Stadt =

The Evangelisch-reformierte Kirche Basel-Stadt (literally: Evangelical-Reformed Church of the Canton Basel-Stadt) is a Reformed denomination in the canton of Basel-Stadt. In 2004, it had 51,000 members in six German parishes with 3 German speaking congregations, one Italian congregation, one French Reformed congregation, and 49 ordained clergy. It is a member of the Federation of Swiss Protestant Churches and the Conference of Churches on the Rhine.

The church was established by Johannes Oekolampad in 1529. For 400 years, it was the state church in Basel. Women's ordination is allowed.
