= Protestant Reformed Church of Alsace and Lorraine =

Alsatian reformed church

Église protestante réformée d'Alsace et de Lorraine Protestant Reformed Church of Alsace and Lorraine
- Classification: Protestant
- Orientation: Continental Reformed
- Theology: Calvinism
- Polity: Presbyterian
- Leader: Christian Krieger
- Associations: CCR, CPCE, FPF, UEPAL, WCC and WCRC
- Headquarters: Strasbourg, Alsace
- Origin: 1895 in Strasbourg
- Branched from: pre-1905 Reformed Church of France
- Congregations: 52
- Members: 33,000

The Protestant Reformed Church of Alsace and Lorraine (French: Église protestante réformée d'Alsace et de Lorraine (EPRAL); German: Reformierte Kirche von Elsass und Lothringen; Alsatian: d'Reformierta Kìrch vum Elsàss ùn Lothringa) is a Calvinist denomination in Alsace and northeastern Lorraine (the Département of Moselle), France. As a church body, it enjoys the status as an établissement public du culte (public establishment of cult).

== Creeds and memberships ==
The EPRAL adheres to the Apostles Creed, Nicene Creed, Heidelberg Catechism and the Second Helvetic Confession. The EPRAL has approximately 33,000 members in 52 congregations served by 50 pastors. Congregations holding services in German and use the current German Protestant hymnal Evangelisches Gesangbuch issued by the Protestant church bodies in Austria, France (Alsace-Moselle), Germany and Luxembourg (1993–1996), in a regional edition (Ausgabe Baden / Elsass-Lothringen) including traditional hymns from Alsace, Baden and Moselle.

In 2006, the EPRAL formed with the EPCAAL the Union of Protestant Churches of Alsace and Lorraine. This is no united body, but it provides common decision making structure and single body of pastors. However, the two churches maintain their own organisation. The EPRAL is member of the Protestant Federation of France and of the World Communion of Reformed Churches, and the World Council of Churches. The EPRAL was a founding member of the Conference of Churches on the Rhine in 1961, which now functions as a regional group of the Community of Protestant Churches in Europe (CPCE). The EPRAL has close fellowship with the Reformed Church of France.

== History ==
The first Calvinist congregation in the area was founded by John Calvin in Strasbourg in Alsace. It has its origin in the very early times of the Reformation. In the 16th and 17th centuries, the populations in a number of small imperial estates or free imperial cities including their governments (princes or city councils) had adopted the Calvinist confession; in other such territories, the ruling princes introduced the Calvinist faith using their privilege of Cuius regio, eius religio. Calvinist confessions spread in the northern and eastern part of the area with concentrations in Mulhouse and Metz. In Strasbourg, some enclaves in northern Alsace and the Vosges, Calvinists form only small minority communities but the Republic in Mulhouse was Calvinist at the time of the French Revolution, when all of their land had become a part of France.

After the conclusion of the Concordat of 1801 with the Vatican applying to French Catholicism, in 1802 Napoleon I decreed the organic articles which constituted also the other then-existing major religious groups in France, the Calvinists, Jews and Lutherans, as recognised public religious bodies (établissements publics du culte). These bodies all followed a similar model with semigovernmental leading bodies, such as the Reformed Central Council (Conseil central; est. on 26 March 1852) in Paris, the Lutheran General Consistory (renamed as supreme consistory as of 1852) in Strasbourg and the Israelite Central Consistory in Paris. Subordinate to the chief bodies there were regional consistories each comprising several congregations altogether counting at least 6,000 souls. The organic articles shaped the constitution of the pre-1905 Reformed Church of France.

The representatives of the Calvinist church accepted the governmentally imposed structure, since it did not put the Calvinist church in a worse position than the other creeds. However, Napoleon's model of hierarchical parastatal governance was a harsh breach with many crucial Reformed presbyterial and synodal traditions. Pastors were not employed and paid by the church people, constituted in the congregations, but were chosen and paid by the government and subordinate to the government-appointed members of the consistories.

Napoleon's law did not provide for a general synod, the only body relevant in taking decisions in matters of doctrine and teaching for all the church, and while the law de jure provided for regional synods combining representatives of at least five consistorial ambits the government de facto never allowed their convocation. Lacking a general synod, last convened in 1659, and with no provincial synods convoked, the Calvinist congregations formed the only decision-taking body, though restricted to local church matters, legitimised by the Calvinist doctrine. Until 1852 the law did not even recognise Calvinist congregations but considered them as legally indistinct local outposts of the parastatal consistories.

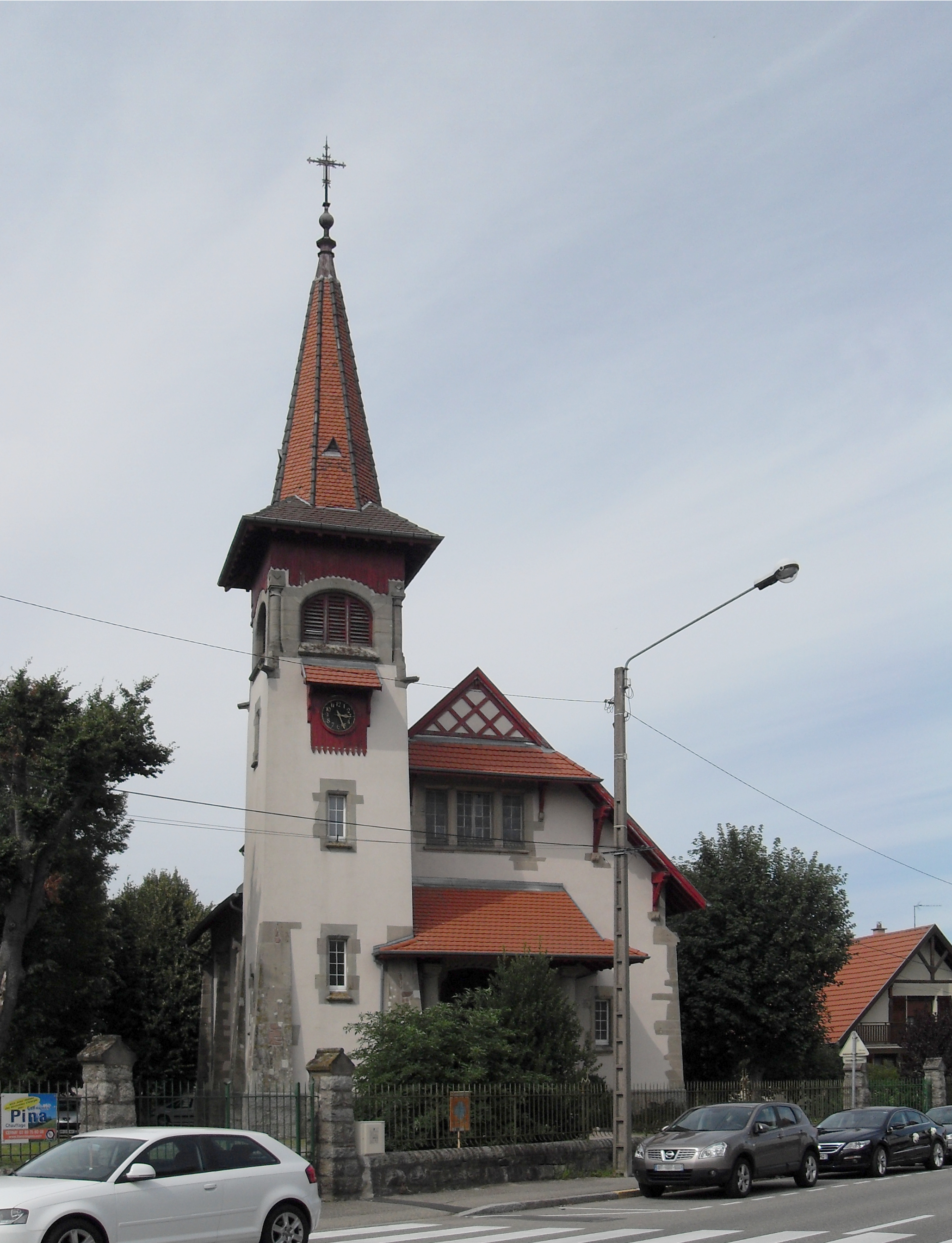
Reformed Temple in Cernay

On 26 March 1852 Napoleon III signed a decree, influenced by Charles Read, which still did not provide for a general synod, but at least made the Reformed congregations distinct legal entities, whose governing bodies (called presbyteries) - according to then Reformed doctrine - were elected by the male adult members. The new Central Council established in 1852, the supreme executive body of the Reformed Church of France, was staffed with incumbents appointed by the government, a practice clearly contradicting the presbyterial and synodal doctrine of Calvinism.

In the course of the 19th century, Calvinists in France clung to different theological movements, such as traditionalist Calvinism, rationalist theology, Christian revival and liberal Christianity. So, the pre-1905 Reformed Church of France entered into heavy controversies on doctrinal and teaching matters which could not be resolved due to the lacking general synod. Many Calvinists were adherents of the Christian revival movement (in France, they were then called évangéliques), colliding with proponents of religious liberalism. The congregations still could not employ the pastors, since the advowson was with the parastatal consistories. When the consistories appointed pastors of a particular theological leaning to a congregation whose members and elected bodies clung to another opinion, it often created hefty quarrels.

Two pastoral conferences were convened each by proponents of one of the two main currents in French Calvinism; the liberals met in Nîmes and the revivalists in Paris. They had no mandate for binding decisions, since elected laymen were not represented. Revivalists demanded a general synod, in order to conclude a binding confession of faith, while moderate liberals agreed but radical liberals denied that a general synod decision would at all be binding in matters of teaching and doctrine. Only in June and July 1872 the French government finally allowed the gathering of a general synod.

However, the Calvinist congregations in Alsace and the Lorraine department could not benefit from this any more. After France had waged war on Prussia (then a member of the North German Confederation) the former was defeated by the latter and its allies. By the Treaty of Frankfurt France ceded Alsace and parts of two northeastern départements of Lorraine to the newly united Germany. The Reformed congregations there with approximately 39,000 parishioners were separated from the Reformed Church of France in May 1871. Unlike the Lutheran Church of the Confession of Augsburg of France (Église de la Confession d’Augsbourg de France) whose directory (directoire) and supreme consistory (consistoire supérieur) were located in Strasbourg in Alsace, with the vast majority of its members also residing in Alsace-Lorraine and subsequently transforming into the Protestant Church of Augsburg Confession of Alsace and Lorraine (Église protestante de la Confession d'Augsbourg d'Alsace et de Lorraine; EPCAAL) territorially confined to the new German state of Alsace-Lorraine, the central governing body of the French Calvinists, the Central Council, was based in Paris. Evading from the subordination to the non-elected Central Council, which was mostly staffed with proponents of liberal Christianity, whom the French government preferred, was rather welcome to the Calvinists in Alsace-Lorraine.

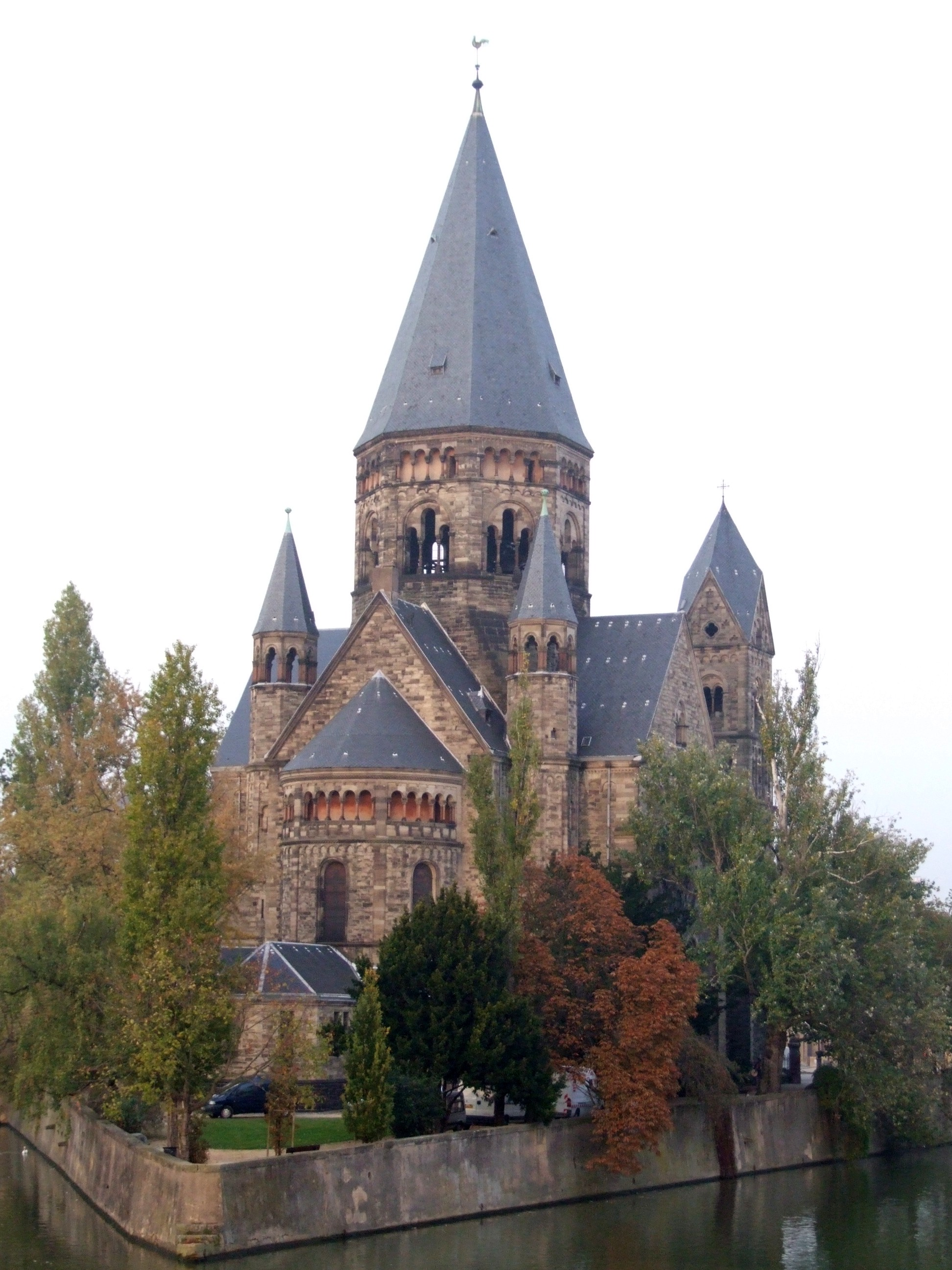
Temple Neuf, Metz

Whereas the Alsatian Reformed consistories comprised all the Calvinist congregations in Alsace, the Calvinist congregations in the new German Lorraine department used to be part of the Nancy consistorial ambit since 1850, so that a Reformed consistory of Metz was refounded in 1871, however, competent only for the Calvinists in German Lorraine. Already in 1822 the French government had established a Reformed consistory in Metz, which, however, had been moved to Nancy in 1850. The then five Reformed consistorial ambits in Alsace-Lorraine existed side by side without any umbrella organisation.

In this, their situation was similar to that of the three Israelite consistories in the area which had been cut off from the Paris-based Central Consistory. Proponents of Calvinism and Judaism then took the endeavour to form new statewide umbrella organisations. According to Calvinist doctrine, the new central body needed the mandate of an elected synod rather than being a parastatal authority. In 1872, Upper President Eduard von Moeller rejected the Calvinist and Jewish proposals, arguing he would interfere as little as possible in the current state of legal affairs of Alsace-Lorraine as long as no Alsace-Lorrainese legislative body were established. At the same time, Moeller forbade the Calvinist consistories to send delegates to the 1872 Eisenach Church Conference (Eisenacher Kirchenkonferenz). When in 1882 the five Reformed consistories were invited to send a delegate to the Eisenach Church Conference, the consistories lacking any joint body long quarrelled about whom to send.

In 1885, the state administration proposed that the Calvinist consistory of Metz apply to merge into EPCAAL. The Metz consistory, the other four Calvinist consistories and EPCAAL opposed that proposal. So the Alsatian Reformed consistories felt the need to establish a statewide Calvinist church and started a new initiative to that end. By mid-1892 the four Alsatian consistorial delegates formed a committee in order to prepare a constitutive synod, while Metz refused to participate. In October the committee sent its proposal to the state administration and asked it to convene that synod. Although the state administration rejected a constitutive synod in February 1892, as being not provided by French law, this time it offered the Reformed committee an alternative, by convoking a regional synod as provided by the French organic articles if five consistories apply.

Now, the Alsatian Calvinists took the administration up on its proposal postponing any decisions of the Calvinist consistories as to new examination rules for Strasbourg University graduates of Protestant theology, arguing these can only effectively be taken, once a Calvinist church body be established. Now the consistory of Metz threw a spanner into the preparatory works by demanding its merger into the EPCAAL. However, the Department of Justice and Religious Affairs of the state administration now "determined that the law required only that there be five consistories available for the synod, not that all five consent to form the body." This was because by French law the government convened regional synods for the ambits of at least five consistories, whereas the concerned consistories had no say in this matter.

French law contradicted itself in how to choose delegates for a Calvinist regional synod, either the consistories would send delegates (Organic articles), or the parishes would elect representatives (1852 decree). So only on 16 and 17 April 1895, representatives of the four Alsatian Reformed consistorial ambits, with Metz boycotting, formed their synod, thus formally constituting today's Protestant Reformed Church of Alsace and Lorraine (EPRAL). Since then the synodals elect the Synodal Council (Conseil Synodal, Synodalvorstand), as central governing body of the church representing the synod when not convened.

In 1901, the Lutheran Supreme Consistory of the EPCAAL had definitely rejected the Metz consistory to be accepted into the EPCAAL as a united Protestant consistorial ambit and the Lorrain department president Hans von Hammerstein-Loxten, favouring the union of Calvinists and Lutherans, terminated his presidency term. In November 1902 the Calvinist Consistory of Metz gave itself up to fate and agreed to be part of the EPRAL and started participating in the statewide Calvinist bodies established seven years earlier. So Metz set some conditions, which the Reformed synodals willingly fulfilled in 1903. The special united Protestant character of several congregations in the Metz consistorial ambit was to be maintained and congregations were to be entitled to officially use, if they wished so, the brand Protestant (evangelisch) instead of Reformed as part of the parish name.

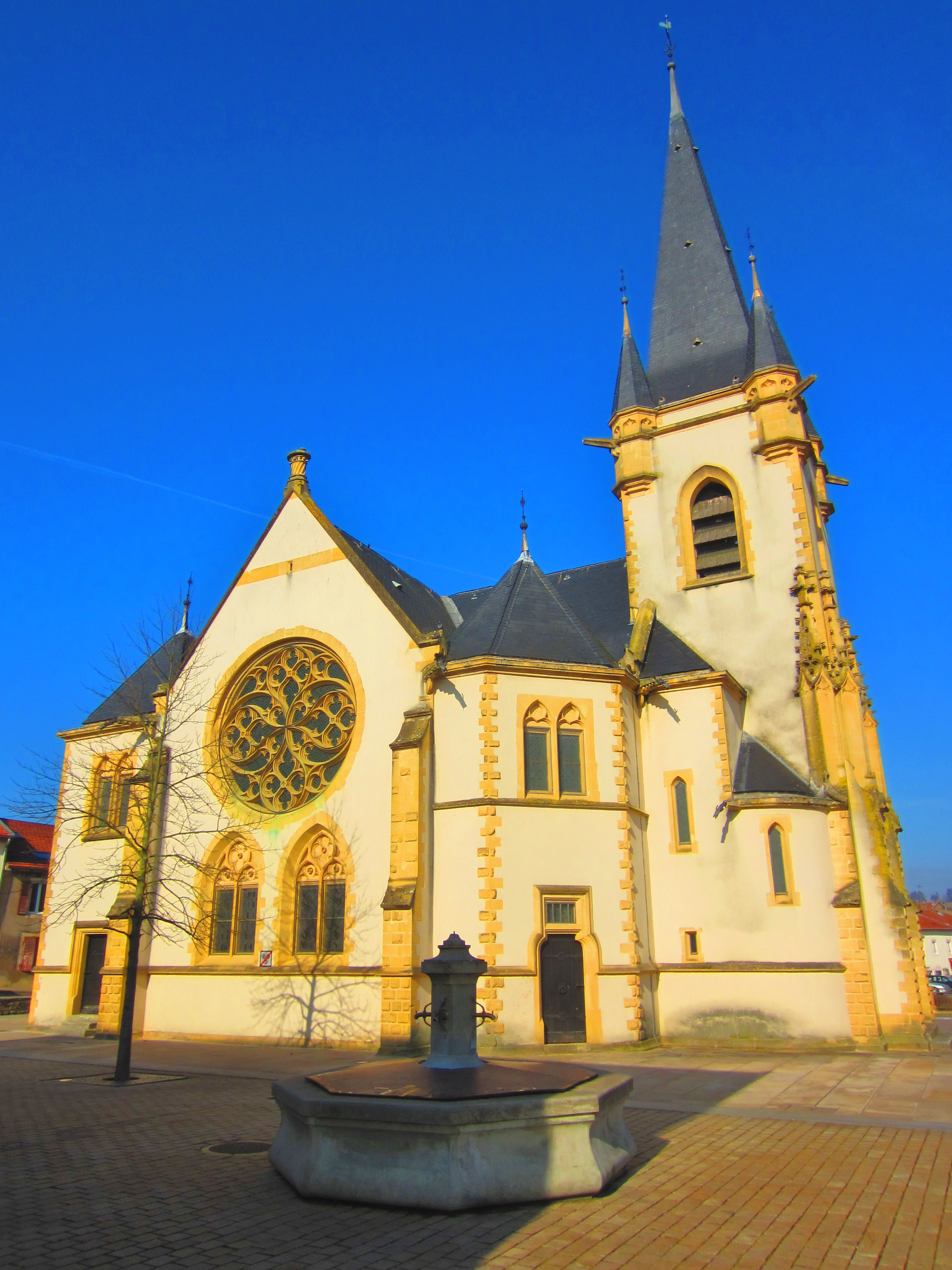
Reformed Temple in Courcelles-Chaussy

After 1871, many people from interior Germany settled in Alsace-Lorraine, among them rather few Calvinists, because Calvinism is a minority faith among the German Protestants, who then still formed a majority in the German overall population.

In all the then-three German federal states adjacent to Alsace-Lorraine, Baden, the Bavarian Palatinate and the Prussian Rhineland, the Calvinist and Lutheran church bodies had merged, either through a united Protestant confession (Evangelical State Church in Baden as of 1821, Protestant State Church of the Palatinate as of 1817) or in administration only (by way of a united umbrella) maintaining separate confessions in the local congregations (Evangelical State Church of Prussia's older Provinces; united umbrella since 1817). So Protestant officials from interior Germany delegated to posts in Alsace-Lorraine often had no routine with a Calvinist and a Lutheran church existing side by side. This caused their expectation for the Reformed and the Lutheran churches in Alsace-Lorraine to unite, promoted by the administration of Alsace-Lorraine, especially since the head of state of Alsace-Lorraine, the German Emperor himself, in personal union king of Prussia was as such the supreme governor of the united old-Prussian church body.

However, the Lutheran Supreme Consistory in Strasbourg asserted its continued existence as recognised public-law religious body in 1872, although reconfined to Alsace-Lorraine only, so that thereafter any merger with the – by membership – smaller Calvinist consistories turned unlikely and did not materialise in the end. Nevertheless, the recognition of an all Alsatian-Lorrain Reformed church umbrella was protracted by the authorities. Only on 21 June 1905 did the Alsatian-Lorrain state committee (Landesausschuss, between 1874 and 1911 the indirectly elected parliament), passing the first law altering the French legal situation as to religious bodies, recognised the Synodal Council as governing body of the Reformed Church of Alsace and Lorraine. By the new Constitution of Alsace-Lorraine, enacted in 1911, the president of the Synodal Council as a representative of one of the two Protestant regional churches in Alsace-Lorraine, like one representative of each public-law religious body in Alsace-Lorraine, became an ex officio member of the first chamber of the parliament of Alsace-Lorraine (the Landtag). Charles Piepenbring, president of the Synodal Council from 1898 to 1913, represented the church in the Landtag, then followed by Albert Kuntz.

Whereas in metropolitan France, the 1905 French law on the Separation of the Churches and the State did away with the Concordat of 1801 and the organic articles; these provisions remained valid law in Alsace-Lorraine also after its return to France as part of the Local law in Alsace-Moselle. Only during the German occupation (1940–1944/1945) the organic articles had been abolished in 1941 as part of the Nazi Weltanschauung policy doing away with public funding of religious bodies and religious instruction in all schools. But with the reestablishment of French law, the pre-1940 legal status was reconstituted. Therefore, the EPRAL cannot merge with the new Reformed Church of France, a religious association established in 1938 by merging four religious bodies, unless the EPRAL would waive its concordatory status, which also provides for the clergy being paid by the government and Calvinist pupils in public schools entitled to participate in religious instruction classes following EPRAL guidelines.

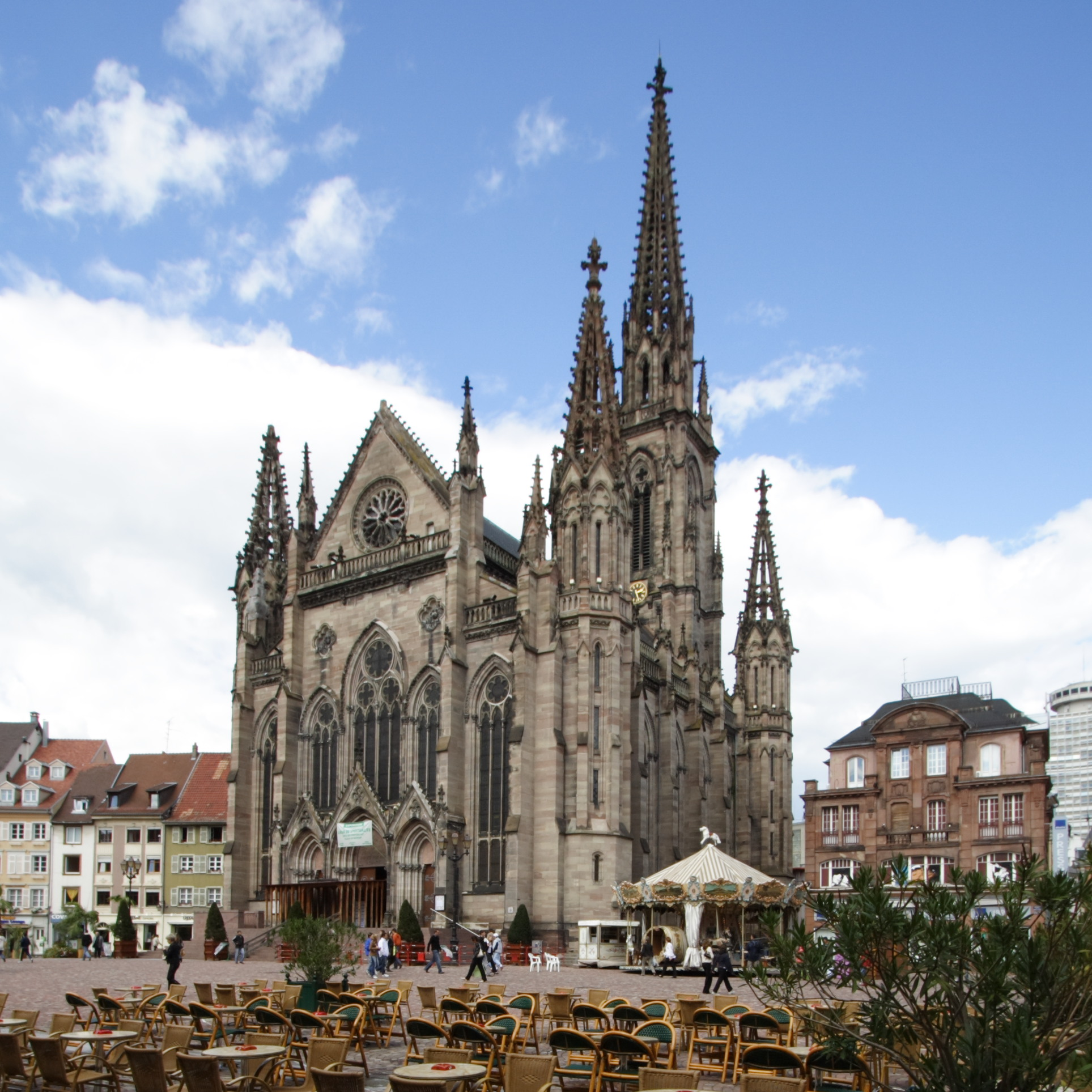
Temple Saint-Étienne in Mulhouse

== Organisation ==
The EPRAL has a presbyterial-synodal system of church government. The legislative body of EPRAL is the synod with 33 synodals. They elect and control the Synodal Council (Conseil synodal) and its president for three year terms. Since 1 September 2012 Pastor Christian Krieger serves as president of the Synodal Council. The EPRAL has its headquarters (Synodal Council) in Strasbourg.

EPRAL has a mobile form of pastoral ministry. The congregations (paroisses, i.e. parishes) are grouped in four (till 2009 five) consistorial ambits: The consistories are based in Bischwiller, Metz, Mulhouse und Strasbourg. The former consistorial ambit of Sainte-Marie-aux-Mines was merged into that of Strasbourg due to decreasing numbers of parishioners in 2009. By the French Organic Articles each time several congregations form a consistory (consistoire), with the term used for the board and its district alike. As religious statutory law corporations (établissements publics des cultes) the consistories have legal entity status, holding property of their own and receiving contributions from member parishes.

Each consistory comprises all the pastors active in its district and the double number of laypersons, elected for three year terms by the local church presbyteries. The consistorial members elect from their midst their executive, the consistorial council (Conseil consistorial) of four members. Consistorial decisions are presented to the French minister of the Interior, who may oppose them within a two-month period, and reported to the EPRAL Synodal Council. The consistories appoint the pastors after proposition by the presbytery of the concerned congregation. The ordination of women and blessings of same-sex marriages are allowed.

== Presidents ==
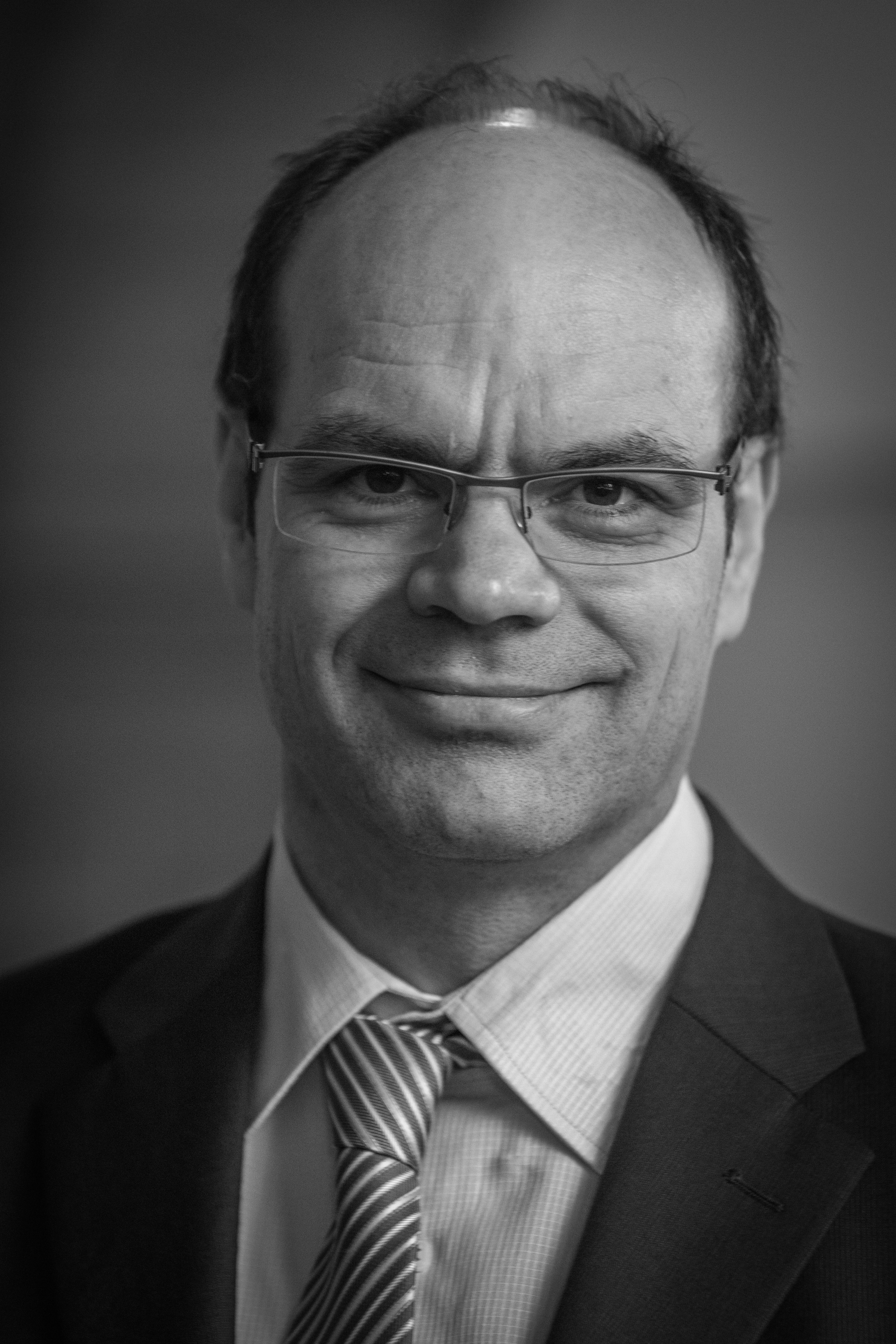
Christian Krieger, president of the Synodal Council of EPRAL.

A selection of presidents of the Synodal Council (French: Président du Conseil Synodal):

- 1895–1898: Karl Buhl (1821–1898), titled Präsident des Synodalvorstands
- 1898–1913: Charles Piepenbring (1840–1928), titled Präsident des Synodalvorstands
- 1913–1935: Albert Kuntz, till 1919 titled Präsident des Synodalvorstands
- 1935–1955: Charles Bartholmé (1881–1962)
- 1955–1970: Philippe Edouard Wagner
- 1970–1982: Christian Schmidt
- 1982–1988: Thérèse Klipffel
- 1988–2000: Antoine Pfeiffer
- 2000–2006: Jean-Paul Humbert
- 2006–2012: Geoffroy Goetz
- 2012–present: Christian Krieger
