= Local law in Alsace–Moselle =

Overview of local law in Alsace-Moselle

The territory of the former Alsace–Lorraine, legally known as Alsace–Moselle, is a region in the eastern part of France, bordering with Germany. Its principal cities are Metz and Strasbourg. Alsace-Moselle was part of the German Empire from 1871 to 1918, and was subsequently reoccupied by Germany from 1940 until its recapture by the Allies at the end of World War II. Consisting of the two departments that make up the region of Alsace, which are Haut-Rhin and Bas-Rhin, and the department of Moselle, which is the northeastern part of Lorraine, there are historical reasons for the continuance of local law in Alsace-Moselle. Alsace–Moselle maintains its own local legislation, applying specific customs and laws on certain issues in spite of its being an integral part of France. These laws are principally in areas that France addressed by changing its own law in the period 1871–1919, when Alsace-Moselle was a part of Germany.

Alsace-Moselle has many speakers of a form of High German known as Alsatian, an Alemannic dialect of Upper German. Its native speakers are mostly in Alsace. Several Franconian dialects of West Middle German are also spoken in the district of Moselle, although their number of native speakers has dwindled significantly since the Second World War and the French language is now overwhelmingly heard in these districts. The region's German-language past is now, at the beginning of the 21st century, mostly evident in the names of towns, streets, villages and rivers.

== Principles ==
The local law (French: droit local) in Alsace-Moselle is a legal system that operates in parallel with French law. Created in 1919, the local law preserves some French laws that were in force before 1870 and were maintained by the German government but were repealed after 1871 in France. It also maintains some German laws enacted by the German Empire between 1871 and 1918, some specific provisions adopted by the local authorities, and some French laws that have been enacted after 1919 to be applicable only in the three concerned departments.

In 1919, a Commissioner of the Republic (Commissaire de la République), whose duty was to restart the French administration in Alsace-Moselle following German defeat in World War I, had to choose between local law and general law. These provisions were supposed to be temporary. However, two further enactments of 1 June 1924 made them permanent. These laws were extended six times between 1934 and 1951. The 1951 legislation did not have a time limit. Even at the beginning of the 21st century, the German language text for some laws in force in Alsace-Moselle is considered the binding one, the translated French text serving only as a non-binding commentary.

== Religion ==
Perhaps the most striking of the legal differences between interior France and Alsace-Moselle is the absence in Alsace-Moselle of a separation of church and state (cf. 1905 French law on the Separation of the Churches and the State), even though a constitutional right of freedom of religion is guaranteed by the French government. Alsace-Moselle is still governed by a pre-1905 French law established by the Concordat of 1801 which provides for the public subsidy to the Roman Catholic Dioceses of Metz and of Strasbourg, the Lutheran Protestant Church of Augsburg Confession of Alsace and Lorraine, the Calvinist Protestant Reformed Church of Alsace and Lorraine and the Jewish religion of the three local Israelite consistorial ambits of Colmar, Metz, and Strasbourg, as well as providing for public education in these faiths, although parents are now allowed to refuse religious education for their children. The clergy for these religions are on the state's payroll. Catholic bishops are named by the President of the French Republic following a proposal by the Pope. The heads of the Lutheran and Calvinist churches are appointed by the prime minister, after being elected by the competent religious bodies. The public University of Strasbourg has courses in theology and is famous for its teaching of Protestant theology.

This situation is unusual in a country like France where church and state are more strictly separated than in most other nations. There is debate over whether the second largest religion in France, Islam, should enjoy comparable status with the four official religions.

== Some specific provisions ==
In the area of work and finance, specific provisions have been made in local law for a local social security system, including additional, compulsory insurance and regulations governing remuneration during a short sickness absence. There are differences with French law also in the areas of personal bankruptcy, voluntary associations and in local work law (Code professionnel local). Working is generally prohibited on Sundays and public holidays. Alsace-Moselle has two more public holidays (Good Friday and 26 December) than the rest of France and there are differences in the status of some crafts and trades, for example, winemakers and brewers.

Communes have to provide aid to resourceless people and they generally have more power than in the rest of France. They manage hunting rights, which are sold by auction for nine years at a time; land owners are not the owners of the game and cannot forbid hunting on their land although the hunters are responsible for game's damage.

During political elections, most election literature is written bilingually in both French and German. The land book (livre foncier) is not held by the tax directorate but by a court service. Trains run on the right of the double tracks, as they did under the administration of the Imperial Railways in Alsace–Lorraine and still do in Germany, whereas in the rest of France they normally run on the left.

Since the end of the 20th century, some of the local laws have been incorporated into general law, especially in the areas of social security, personal bankruptcy and social aid. Some others have been repealed, like the work law and the election literature, which meet now the French general law. A long unenforced law against blasphemy was also repealed in 2016. However, working on Sundays remains restricted as of August 2009.
