= Protestant Federation of France =

French Non-Profit Organization

- Fédération protestante de France
- Abbreviation: FPF
- Classification: Protestant
- Orientation: Reformed, Lutheran evangelical
- President: Christian Krieger
- Region: France
- Headquarters: Paris
- Origin: 1905
- Official website: www.protestants.org

The Protestant Federation of France (Fédération protestante de France) is a religious organisation created on 25 October 1905, which united the main Protestant Christian groupings in France. In 2023, the current president is Christian Krieger, who took over from previous president François Clavairoly in 2022.

It is a member of the World Council of Churches.

== Federation ==
The Protestant Federation of France may be further divided as follows:

- Lutheran
- Reformed
- Evangelical
- Pentecostal

Exhaustive list (2019) of Churches or unions of Churches which are members of the PFF:

- United Protestant Church of France (EPUF, Église protestante unie de France), 2013 union of the Reformed Church of France (ERF) and the Evangelical Lutheran Church in France (EELF)
- Union of Protestant Churches of Alsace and Lorraine (UEPAL, Union des Églises protestantes d'Alsace et de Lorraine), 2006 union of the Protestant Church of Augsburg Confession of Alsace and Lorraine (EPCAAL) and the Protestant Reformed Church of Alsace and Lorraine (EPRAL)
- National Union of Independent Reformed Evangelical Churches of France (UNEPREF, Union nationale des églises protestantes réformées évangéliques de France, formerly EREI)
- Fédération des Églises évangéliques baptistes de France (FEEBF)
- Mission populaire évangélique de France (MPEF)
- Union des Églises évangéliques libres de France (UEEL)
- Salvation Army (AdS, Armée du Salut)
- Malagasy Protestant Church in France (FPMA, Église protestante malgache en France)
- Communauté des Églises d'expressions africaines en France (CEAF)
- Union of the Church of God in France (UEDF, Union de l’Église de Dieu en France)
- Gypsy Evangelical Mission in France (Light and Life) (METF, Vie et Lumière)
- Union des Églises évangéliques de Réveil (UEER)
- Church of the Nazarene (UEPN, Union de l'Église protestante du Nazaréen)
- Communion des Églises de l’espace francophone (CEEF)
- Communion d'Églises protestantes évangéliques (CÉPÉE)
- International Church of the Foursquare Gospel (UEPFF, Union des Églises protestantes Foursquare France
- Union d'assemblées protestantes en mission (UAPM)
- Seventh-day Adventist Church (UFA, Union des Fédérations adventistes de France
- Église de Pentecôte de France (EPF)
- Église Hillsong de Paris
- Fédération des Églises coréennes en France (FECF)
- Union d'Assemblées de Dieu membre de la FPF (ADFP)
- Armenian Evangelical Church (UEEAF, Union des Églises évangéliques arméniennes de France)
- Union de l’Église évangélique méthodiste de France (UEEMF)
- Union des Églises protestantes évangéliques Horizon (UEPEH)

Associated members

- Agapé - France
- Communauté d'Églises protestantes francophones (Ceeefe)
- German Protestant Church in Paris (Église évangélique allemande de Paris)
- Japanese Protestant Church (Église protestante de langue japonaise)
- Église protestante évangélique de Rochefort
- American Church in Paris (Église américaine de Paris)
- Swedish Church in Paris (Église luthérienne suédoise)

Former members

- Apostolic Church (EA, Église apostolique)

In 2023, the federation unites approximately 30 churches or unions of churches, as well as 80 associations which represent about 500 communities, institutions and movements; the member churches of the PFF comprise more than 1,400 parishes and 1,600 pastors.

The churches cooperate in variety of sectors: childcare, care of the elderly, social and medical action, holidays and outings in the community, education, communication, art, international relations, development.

== Presidents ==
1. Édouard Gruner (1905–1927)
2. Rev. Émile Morel (1927–1929)
3. Rev. Marc Boegner (1929–1961)
4. Rev. Charles Westphal (1961–1970)
5. Jean Courvoisier (1970–1977)
6. Rev. Jacques Maury (1977–1987)
7. Rev. Jacques Stewart (1987–1997)
8. Rev. Jean Tartier (1997–1999)
9. Rev. Jean-Arnold de Clermont (1999–2007)
10. Rev. Claude Baty (2007–2013)
11. Rev. François Clavairoly (September 2013–June 2022)
12. Rev. Christian Krieger (July 2022–present)

== See also ==
- Lyon Anglican Church
