= Jean-Arnold de Clermont =

French minister

Jean-Arnold de Clermont (born 22 October 1941 in Paris) is a minister in the French Reformed Church. He was president of the Council of the Protestant Federation of France from 1999 to 2007 and president of the Conference of European Churches from 2003 to 2009.
