= Reformed Church of France =

Main Protestant denomination in France until merger in 2013

- Logo of the Reformed Church of France, featuring the burning bush and the Huguenot cross. The script in the left side of the bush reads, "Exode III.2 Flagror Non Consumor" (Exodus 3:2 Burning, yet not consumed)
- Classification: Protestant
- Orientation: Calvinist
- Polity: Presbyterian
- Associations: World Alliance of Reformed Churches, World Council of Churches, Protestant Federation of France
- Origin: 1559
- Separated from: Catholic Church
- Defunct: merged in 2013 with the Evangelical Lutheran Church in France to form the United Protestant Church of France
- Members: 300,000 at the time of merger
- Official website: https://www.eglise-protestante-unie.fr/

The Reformed Church of France (French: Église réformée de France, ERF) was the main Protestant denomination in France with a Calvinist orientation that could be traced back directly to John Calvin. In 2013, the Church merged with the Evangelical Lutheran Church in France to form the United Protestant Church of France.

The church was a member of the Protestant Federation of France (Fédération protestante de France), the World Communion of Reformed Churches and the World Council of Churches.

The church had approximately 300,000 members at the time of merger, distributed in a somewhat unequal fashion throughout French metropolitan territory, with the exception of Alsace-Moselle and the Pays de Montbéliard, as the Protestant Reformed Church of Alsace and Lorraine brings together most of the local Calvinists there. The church consists of 400 parishes, organised in 50 presbyteries (consistoires) and eight administrative regions.

== History ==
=== Background to formation ===
Areas controlled and contested by Huguenots are marked purple and mauve on this map of modern France.

Emerging from the Reformation in the 16th century, the reformed churches in France were organised independently and, by force of circumstance, clandestinely. The first national synod of the Reformed Churches was held in 1559; the first formal confession of faith, the Confession of La Rochelle, was composed in 1571. Recognised but restricted by the Edict of Nantes in 1598, the last official synod met in 1659; subsequently, the churches were suppressed in France by the Edict of Fontainebleau of 1685, which revoked the Edict of Nantes.

The revocation of the Edict of Nantes began a period of systematic state persecution known in French as the Désert (wilderness), an allusion to the sufferings of the Hebrews when they wandered in the wilderness following the flight from Egypt. This was associated with mass emigration to other European countries, North America, and South Africa (les pays de Refuge). In 1787, the Edict of Versailles, issued by Louis XVI, ended most legal discrimination against non-Roman Catholics – including Huguenots. In 1802, the church was recognised in accordance with the Organic Articles (les Articles organiques) which followed Napoleon Bonaparte's concordat with the Roman Catholic Church. This permitted a local and non-national organisation of the church, which did not reflect its traditional organisation (synods, participation of lay members in the pastoral organisation of the Church, etc.)

In the 19th century, the Awakening (le Réveil) and other religious movements influenced the French and European Reformed churches; this was also accompanied by division within French Protestantism. In 1871 the Reformed congregations in German-annexed Alsace and the newly formed Bezirk Lothringen of Lorraine were separated from the Reformed Church in what remained of France. The consistorial districts of the conquered territories then formed the still-existing Protestant Reformed Church of Alsace and Lorraine (EPRAL). At the time of the promulgation of the Separation of Church and State in 1905, which did away with the établissements publics du culte (religious statutory corporations) leaving the status of a religious association, there were no less than four groupings of the Reformed Church: the Evangelical Reformed Churches (les Églises réformées évangéliques), the United Reformed Churches (les Églises réformées unies), the Free Reformed Churches (les Églises réformées libres), and the Methodist Church (l'Église méthodiste).

=== The Reformed Church of France today ===
The horrors of the First World War, combined with new departures in theology (in particular the thought of Karl Barth), allowed for a partial restoration of a national grouping: the Reformed Church of France (L'Église Réformée de France, ÉRF), established in 1938. However, some Reformed congregations preferred not to merge and form their separate union since. The ÉRF is the largest of the four French Protestant churches and is in full communion with the other three (which are also members of the World Council of Churches): the Evangelical Lutheran Church of France (l'Église évangélique luthérienne de France) and in Alsace-Moselle the EPRAL and the Lutheran Protestant Church of Augsburg Confession of Alsace and Lorraine.

In June 2012, it was announced that the Reformed Church of France and the Evangelical Lutheran Church of France would unite to form the United Protestant Church of France (Eglise Protestante unie de France or EPUF).

== Beliefs ==
The 30th General Synod held 1872-1873 was the first national synod held in 213 years. The General Synod arrived at a new confession of faith, the main principles of which were rejected by a significant minority. The official practice of the Calvinist faith in France distanced itself from stricter interpretations. The current Reformed Church adopted liberal currents in Calvinist theology including pietism, neo-Lutheranism, Methodism, social Christianity, etc. The opportunities, substance and limits of theological pluralism are set out in the 1936 Declaration of Faith (which is read at the opening of all synods, adherence to which is required of all pastors licensed to preach and the laity who express membership of the Calvinist church)

== Organisations and relations ==
The church was organised according to a Presbyterian synodal system, with an annual national Synod, composed mainly of representatives from each of the eight administrative regions with equal numbers of clergy and laity in attendance. The president of the National Council (Conseil national) was elected every three years by the Synod.

=== Sister denominations and fraternal relations ===
The Reformed Church in France was involved in the work of other Protestant churches in France, through its membership of the Protestant Federation of France (Fédération protestante de France)

In 2005, Pope Benedict sent a message to the national synod of the Reformed Church of France, which thanked the Pontiff for this "gesture of consideration".

=== Missions ===
In common with other churches, the Reformed Church in France operated a missionary service (le Défap). The mission service supported reformed churches in Africa and Oceania, primarily those arising from the work of the now defunct Paris Evangelical Missionary Society (Société des missions évangéliques de Paris)

=== Theological seminaries ===
Training for the ministry took place in the Institut Protestant de Théologie, which formed part of the Protestant theology faculties of the Universities of Paris and Montpellier.

=== Universities, colleges, and schools ===
The church also operated a distance education programme for lay members called Théovie.

== Symbols ==
Until recently, the Huguenot cross was not an official symbol of the Reformed Church of France. Rather it has served as a sign of popular recognition. The official logo of the former reformed churches was the "burning bush". A new logo of the Reformed Church of France was adopted, a stylised representation of the burning bush with the Huguenot cross as an insert and the Latin phrase Flagror Non Consumor (I am burned, I am not consumed) taken from Exodus 3:2, "...and he looked, and, behold, the bush burned with fire, and the bush was not consumed."

== See also ==
- Camisard
- John Calvin
- Huguenots in South Africa
- French Australian
