= Jean-François Collange =

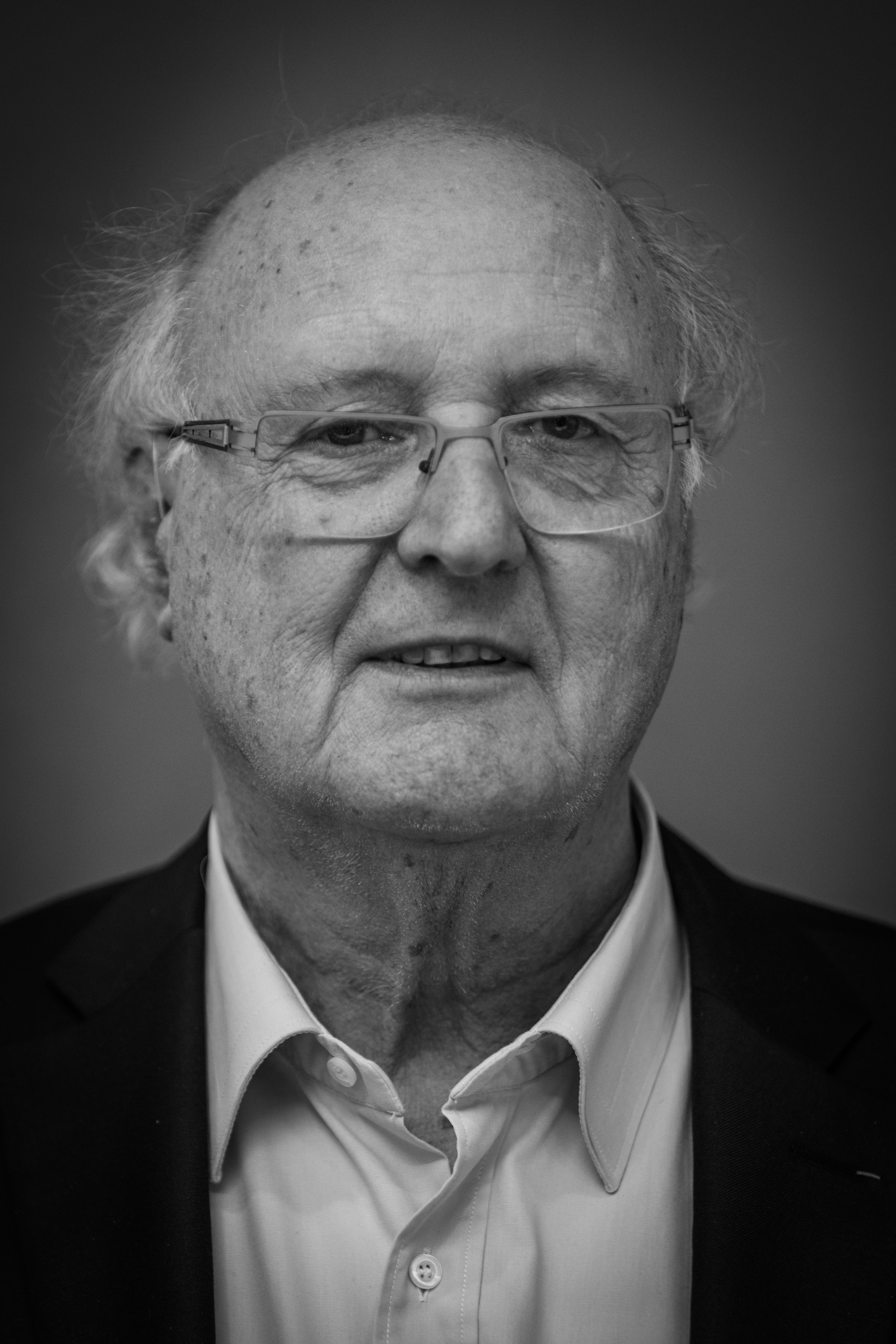
Jean-François Collange (2013)

Jean-François Collange (born Le Puy-en-Velay, 1944) is a French Lutheran pastor and professor of theology.

He served as Lutheran pastor in Alsace and New Caledonia, before turning to exegetical studies, taking up a post of practical theology at the Faculty of Protestant Theology of the University of Strasbourg in 1981. He continued teaching at the faculty until 2000.

In 2003 he was elected President of the Protestant Church of Augsburg Confession of Alsace and Lorraine.

He taught practical theology and ethics at the Faculty of Protestant Theology of the University of Strasbourg, where he served as dean, and went on to lead the Protestant churches of Alsace and Lorraine, becoming in 2006 the first president of the Union of Protestant Churches of Alsace and Lorraine (UEPAL). He was re-elected in 2009 and again in 2012, but announced that he would be standing down at the end of 2013. In an interview in 2013, he admitted that UEPAL was his own initiative.

== Bibliography ==
- Epitre au Corinthiens - 1972
- The Epistle of Saint Paul to the Philippians, 1979 (translation of Epitre au Philippiens - 1973)
- L'éthique du nouveau testament - 1980
- L'épître de Saint Paul à Philémon (Labor et Fides) - 1987
- Théologie des droits de l'homme Editions du Cerf, 1989
- Ethique et transplantation d'organes, 2000
- La vie, quelle vie? [Texte imprimé] : bioéthique et protestantisme, Editions Olivétan, 2007
