= Huguenot cross =

Christian religious symbol

The Huguenot cross

The Huguenot cross is a Christian religious symbol originating in France and is one of the more recognizable and popular symbols of the French evangelical reformed faith. It is commonly found today as a piece of jewellery (often in gold or silver) or engraved on buildings connected with the Reformed Church in France, of which it is the official logo.

It is sometimes asserted that the cross appeared for the first time during the Huguenot Wars (1562–1598) in the south of France. Bertrand Van Ruymbeke asserts instead that the Huguenot cross stands out as "the most revealing" of symbolic signs of latter-day Huguenot solidarity: "Although a Huguenot cross was indeed designed in Nîmes in the 1680s, never was it in France the symbole de reconnaissance it later became for the descendants of the Huguenot refugees in the last third of the nineteenth century" Van Ruymbeke identifies the late 19th-century Huguenot revival as sharing characteristics with two of historian Eric Hobsbawm's three categories of "invented traditions": First, "those establishing or symbolizing social cohesion or the membership of groups, real or artificial communities", and, second, "those whose main purpose [is] socialization, the inculcation of beliefs, value systems and conventions of behavior."

Long after the revocation (1685) of the Edict of Nantes (1598), the Huguenot cross came into general use among 19th-century Huguenot descendants in countries where Huguenot refugees settled, as a sign of both identification with French Huguenot ancestry and confirmation of the wearer's faith.

In 1942, the Free French Protestants in Great Britain issued a badge that paired the Huguenot cross with the Cross of Lorraine, which had been taken up by the Free French Forces.

== Symbolism ==
The Huguenot cross contains significant symbolism:

- The cross as an eminent symbol of the Christian faith, represents not only the death of Christ but also victory over death and piety. This is represented also in the Maltese cross.
- The boutonné, the eight points symbolizing the eight Beatitudes (Matthew 5:3–12)
- Cross of the Order of the Holy Spirit
  Between the arms of the cross is the stylized fleur-de-lys (on the French Coat of Arms), each having 3 petals; the total of twelve petals of the fleur-de-lys signify the Twelve Apostles. Between each fleur-de-lys and the arms of the Maltese cross with which it is joined, an open space in the form of a heart, the symbol of loyalty, suggests the seal of the French Reformer, John Calvin.
- The pendant dove symbolizes the Holy Spirit (Romans 8:16). In times of persecution a pearl, symbolizing a teardrop, replaced the dove.

The elements of the Huguenot cross mirrored those of the cross of the 1578 Order of the Holy Spirit, the senior chivalric order of France by precedence.
