= Protestant Church of the Augsburg Confession of Alsace and Lorraine =

Lutheran denomination in France

- Église protestante de la Confession d’Augsbourg d’Alsace et de Lorraine
- Classification: Protestant
- Orientation: Lutheran
- Polity: Presbyterial-synodal polity
- Leader: Christian Albecker
- Associations: CCR, CPCE, FPF, LWF, UEPAL and WCC
- Headquarters: Strasbourg, Grand Est
- Origin: 1872 in Strasbourg
- Branched from: Evangelical Lutheran Church of France
- Separations: Evangelical Lutheran Church – Synod of France
- Congregations: 208
- Members: 210,000

The Protestant Church of the Augsburg Confession of Alsace and Lorraine (French: Église protestante de la Confession d’Augsbourg d’Alsace et de Lorraine, EPCAAL; German: Protestantische Kirche Augsburgischen Bekenntnisses von Elsass und Lothringen, Kirche A.B. von Elsass und Lothringen; Alsatian: d' Protäschtàntischa Kìrch vum Augsburigischa Bekänntniss vum Elsàss ùn Lothringa) is a Lutheran church of public-law corporation status (établissement public du culte) in France. The ambit of the EPCAAL comprises congregations in Alsace and the Lorrain Moselle department.

== Creeds and memberships ==
The EPCAAL adheres to the Apostles Creed, Nicene Creed, Luther's Small and Large Catechisms, the Formula of Concord, and the Tetrapolitan Confession. The EPCAAL has approximately 210,000 members (as of 2010) in 208 congregations. Congregations holding services in German language use the current German Protestant hymnal Evangelisches Gesangbuch (EG) in a regional edition (Ausgabe Baden / Elsass-Lothringen) that includes traditional hymns from Alsace, Baden, and the Moselle.

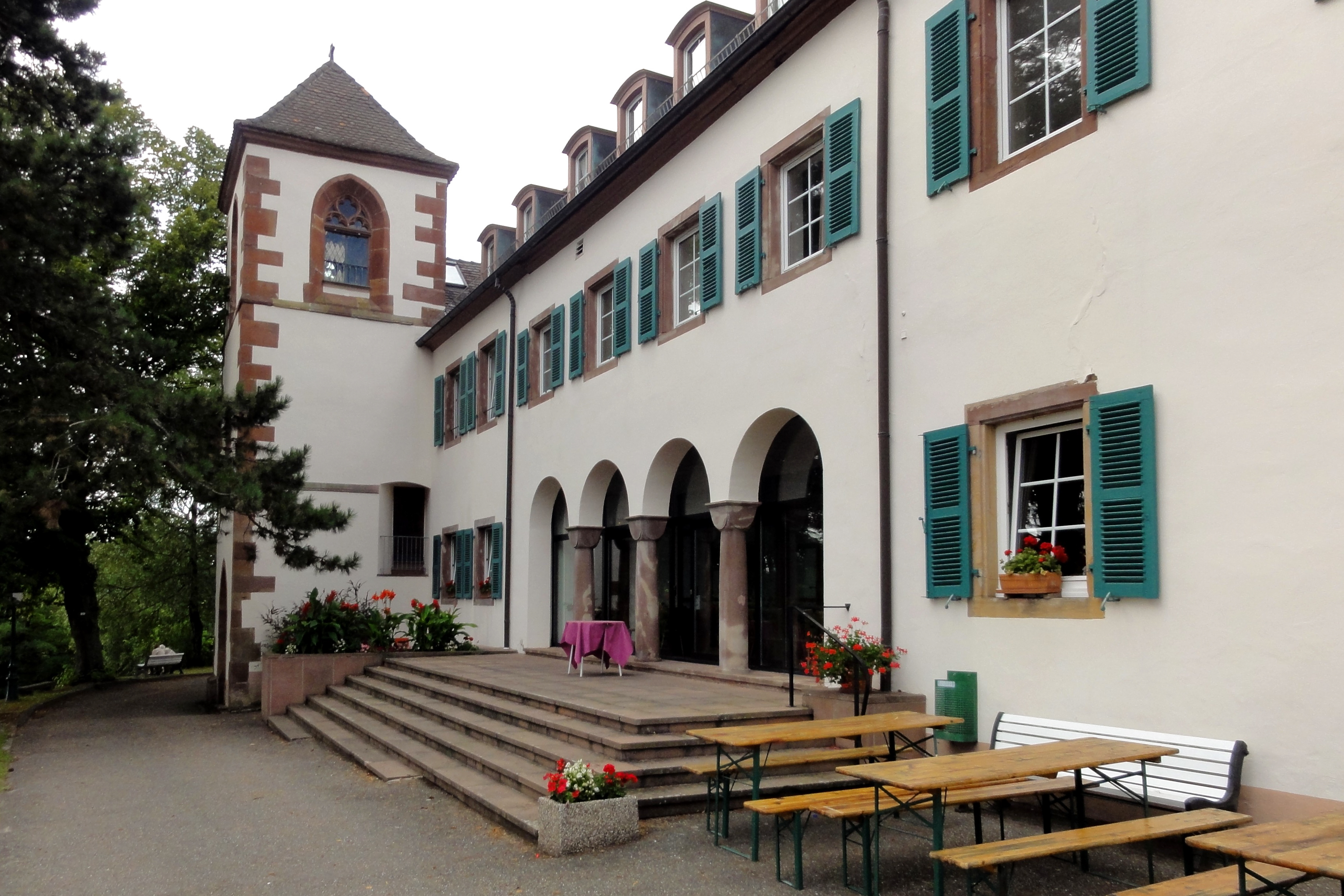
Liebfrauenberg Convent used as Lutheran convention venue

In 1961 the EPCAAL was a founding member of the Conference of Churches on the Rhine, which now functions as a regional group of the Community of Protestant Churches in Europe (CPCE). The first conference took place in EPCAAL's conference centre, the former convent of Liebfrauenberg near Gœrsdorf. Since 2006, the EPCAAL has been a member of the Union of Protestant Churches of Alsace and Lorraine, an administrative umbrella with the Protestant Reformed Church of Alsace and Lorraine (EPRAL). This is not a united body, but it provides a common decision-making structure and a common body of pastors. However, the two churches maintain their own organization. The EPCAAL is also a member of the Fédération protestante de France (FPF, Protestant Federation of France) and of the Lutheran World Federation, and the World Council of Churches. The EPCAAL had close fellowship with the Evangelical Lutheran Church of France.

== History ==
=== Reformation in Alsace and northeastern Lorraine ===
In the early 16th century Alsace and northeastern Lorraine were part of the Holy Roman Empire with the region being partitioned into many different imperial states. Most were monarchies (Duchy of Lorraine, County of Saarwerden, Landgraviate of Upper Alsace, County of Salm), but also several republics (ten free imperial cities federated in the Décapole) and portions of certain ecclesiastical principalities (prince-bishoprics of Metz, Speyer, and Strasbourg).

While the prince-bishops tried to suppress any change towards the Reformation, the monarchies either adopted it or fought it, depending on the positions of their lords. The free imperial cities went through a process of discussion and conflict, winning over a majority of the burghers for the Reformation or not. The Free Imperial City of Mulhouse adopted Calvinism and joined the Swiss Confederation until the French blockade forced the city to accept French supremacy in 1795.

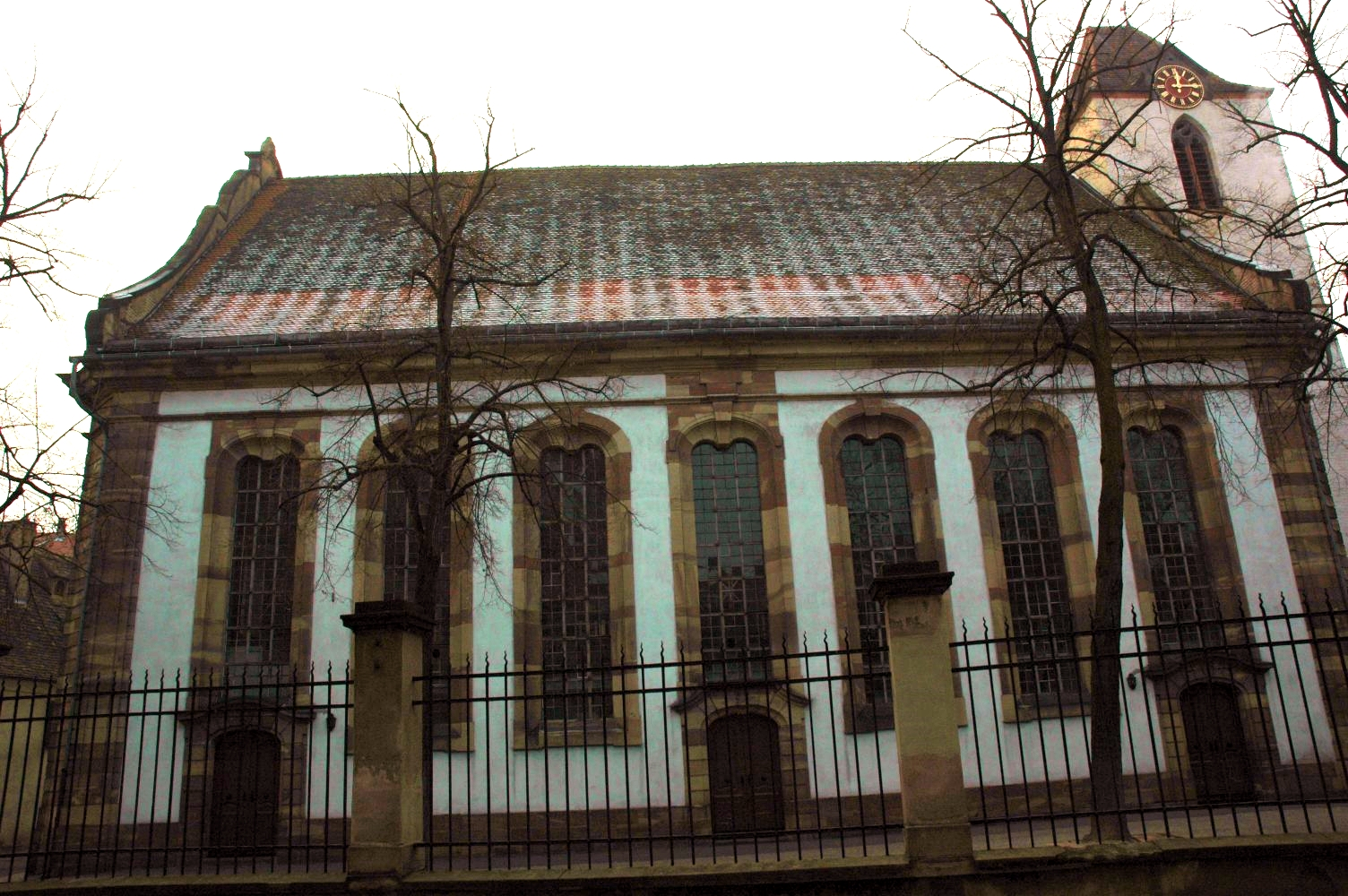
St. Aurelia Church in Strasbourg

In 1523 and 1524, the Free Imperial City of Strasbourg became the next state in Alsace to adopt Lutheranism. Most publishers in Strasbourg agreed to diffuse new ideas by issuing Reformers' tracts and numerous pamphlets. This allowed well-known preachers such as Matthäus Zell, a priest at the Strasbourg Cathedral, to propagate Reformatory theses to a large, enthusiastic community. In the same year theologians and exegetes including Wolfgang Capito, Caspar Hedio, and Martin Bucer, strengthened and built up the Reformatory movement amongst craftsmen and the moderately well to do of Strasbourg. In 1524, St. Aurelia, the market gardeners' parish, asked Bucer to become its pastor and preacher.

Bucer had met Martin Luther in 1518 and adopted his ideas. He then helped implement the Reformation in the Free Imperial City of Wissembourg in Alsace, which resulted in his excommunication by George of the Palatinate, the bishop of Speyer, and his conviction as outlaw. In 1523 he found asylum in Strasbourg, where he set up Bible reading classes and later, in 1529, presented the Reformation. He received John Calvin, who had been expelled from Geneva in 1538. Bucer tried to safeguard the unity of the Church, but failed in reconciling Luther and Zwingli, or bringing Catholics and Protestants to agree at least on some points. At his urging, the city of Strasbourg granted asylum to the persecuted anabaptists. By 1525 the Reformation was gradually spreading not only into the countryside possessions of Strasbourg, but also into territories of other overlords.

Although most capitular canons in the Great Chapter, the chapters of Strasbourg's Old St. Peter's and Young St. Peter's, like much of the traditional clergy, rejected the Reformation, the prince-bishop of Strasbourg, William III of Hohnstein, failed to satisfy the demand for change. Already before the start of the Reformation, adherents of the Bundschuh movement in Alsace had demanded the right to elect their pastors on their own.

The Lutheran church was the state church in the Free Imperial City of Strasbourg, administered by the city government (Magistrate). The city government passed laws on preaching and appropriated the Strasbourg Cathedral for the Lutheran state church in 1524. It granted the Lutheran church the right to induct pastors in the seven parishes in the town and took the responsibility, normally attributed to deacons, of supporting the poor. In 1529 the city government, supported by a large part of the population, decided that the Holy Mass should be abolished. Violent iconoclasm spread – notably among craftsmen – destroying many religious images. The Church of Strasbourg built up its liturgical, doctrinal, and ecclesiastical structures. The church authorities instituted a bimonthly meeting of the pastors and three representatives of the Magistrate (Kirchenpfleger), in order to deal with all matters concerning teaching and doctrine.

Later, upon more reflection, some liturgical aspects of iconographic nature as well as other previously abolished traditions of church life were reintroduced (such as the Christmas Feast Day). On the occasion of the Diet of Augsburg in 1530, where Luther's followers presented the Augsburg Confession, theologians from Strasbourg, Bucer and Capito, authored the Tetrapolitan Confession, adopted by the cities of Constance, Lindau, Memmingen, and Strasbourg. The Church of Strasbourg adopted this confession and developed a theology midway between Zwinglian symbolism and the Lutheran conception of Holy Communion. This midway position was of a moderate and diaconal nature, and quite characteristic of the Reformation along the Rhine.

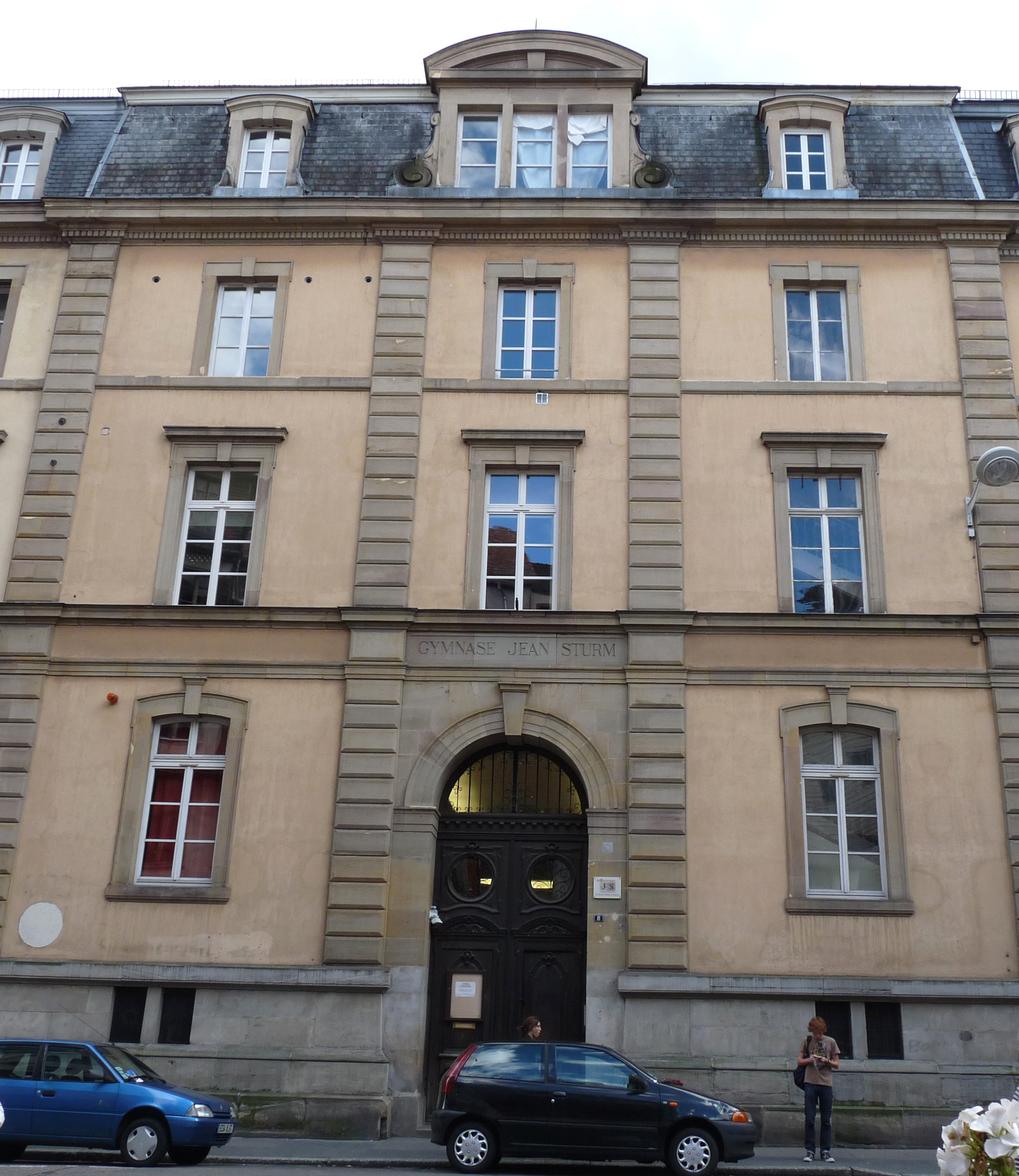
The Gymnase Jean-Sturm in Strasbourg

In the beginning, church discipline was not too strict. Various religious groups were tolerated within the parishes until 1534, when the Magistrate, for fear of dissent, put an end to the toleration. A decree of that year emphasised the importance of the study of the Bible and of inner piety. The educational level of the pastors enabled the development of a catechism and the improvement of the quality of instruction given to future pastors. In 1538 a Great School was opened, now known as the Gymnase Jean-Sturm, which is still run by the EPCAAL today. It was directed by the humanist Johannes Sturm and educated the elite of Lower Alsace.

The Augsburg Interim (1548), demanding the re-institution of Catholicism, had little effect in Alsace and northeastern Lorraine, so that most Protestant states were able to maintain their faith until the Treaty of Augsburg granted the summepiscopate to the regnant princes or magistrates ruling the respective imperial states. Summepiscopate included the cuius regio, eius religio privilege to impose the faith of the inhabitants of one's state.

At the end of the 16th century, under the guidance of Johann Marbach, Alsace adopted the orthodox Lutheran ideas contained in the Formula of Concord of 1577. Even within the cathedral chapter of the Strasbourg diocese, Lutheran capitular canons formed the majority (Strasbourg Chapter Strife, 1583–1604). In 1592 this majority elected John George of Brandenburg as the first Lutheran prince-bishop of Strasbourg.

After the Catholic counts of the House of Nassau-Saarbrücken, ruling the County of Saarwerden, became extinct in the male line in 1574, the Lutheran House of Nassau-Weilburg inherited the county and Philip IV, Count of Nassau-Weilburg introduced the Reformation there. The territory of the former county in the environs of Sarrewerden still shows a high Lutheran share among the overall population.

=== Since the French annexation of Alsace and northeastern Lorraine ===
In the course of the 16th to 19th centuries during its eastward expansion France gradually annexed more and more territories of the Holy Roman Empire. Unlike in France proper (or interior France) Protestants in the Alsatian and Lorrain territories annexed by France after 1648 enjoyed a certain protection by the Treaty of Westphalia, of which France was a signatory. The treaty guaranteed to maintain the religious status quo as given in the reference year of 1624 in all the territories acquired since.

So Alsatian and Lorrain Protestants were spared from the worst persecutions such as compulsory reconversion, galley slavery or religious child abduction. But other restrictions were imposed. The Lutheran Strasbourg Minster was expropriated and Prince-Bishop Franz Egon of Fürstenberg reconsecrated it as Catholic Cathedral on 30 September 1681. In 1684 Louis XIV decreed that all Lutheran and Reformed congregations have to leave the quires of their church buildings for celebrating Holy Masses if there was no Catholic church at the place but at least seven Roman Catholic families. Thus hundreds of church buildings owned by Protestant congregations became de facto simultaneums.

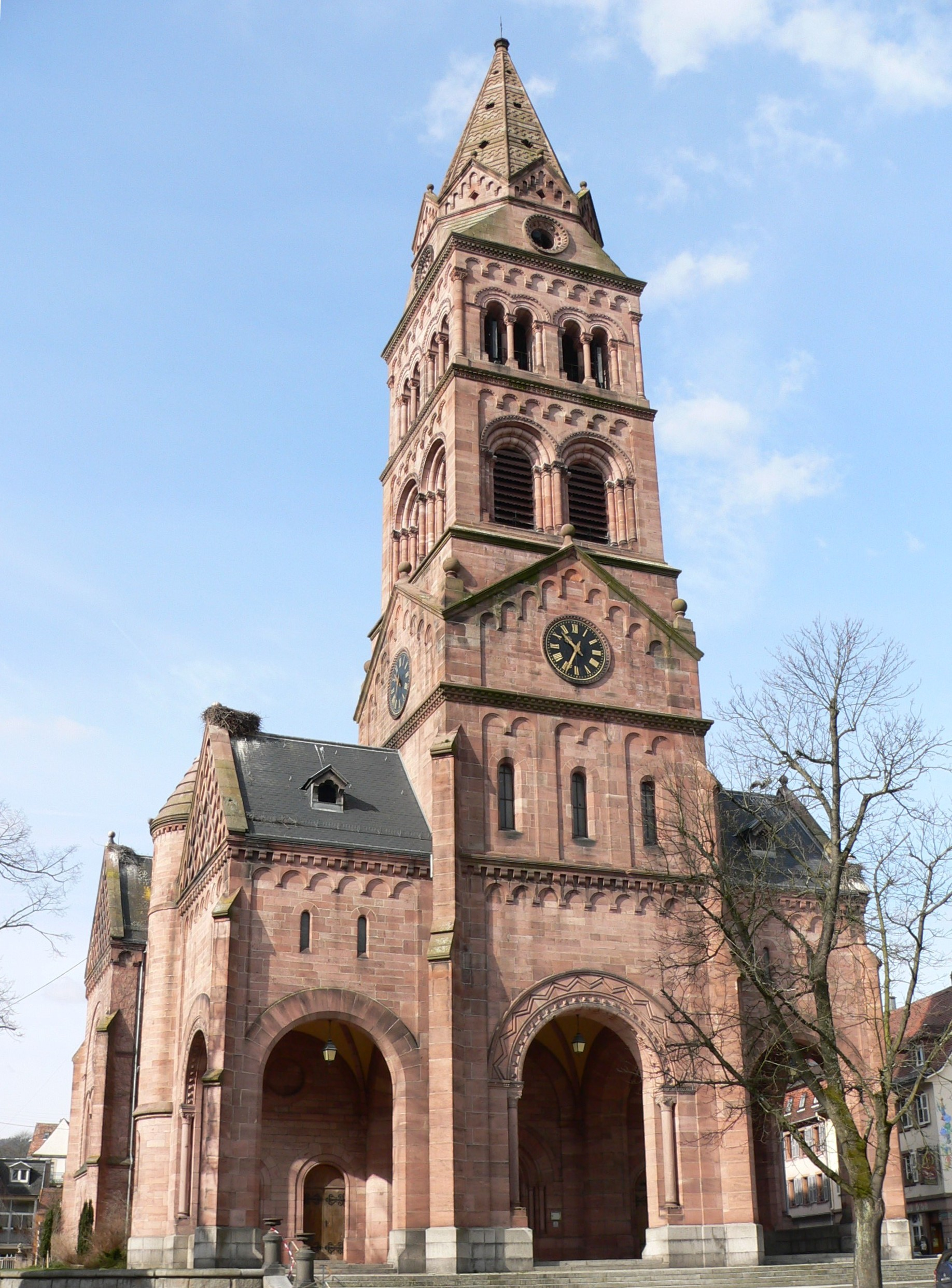
Lutheran Church in Munster

In 1800 220,000 Lutherans in Alsace and the territory of Belfort accounted for one third of the population, and lived mostly in ancient free cities such as Munster, Colmar in Alsace, and Wissembourg, but mainly in Strasbourg where 25,000 out of the 38,000 inhabitants were Protestants, mostly Lutherans. There were 160 Lutheran parishes and over 200 active pastors.

The Protestant churches in France experienced a restructuring under Napoléon I. After he had concluded the Concordat of 1801 with the Vatican he decreed the organic articles also concerning the non-Catholic communities of religion (Calvinists, Jews, Lutherans) imposing on them parastatal executive bodies (consistories), constituting and recognising these communities as établissements publics du culte (public bodies of cult) and subjecting them to state control. On 8 April 1802 Napoleon decreed the establishment of 27 Lutheran consistories, with their ambits comprising several congregations with parishioners amounting to at least 6,000 souls altogether. The chief spiritual board, the General Consistory (Consistoire générale) was established in Strasbourg in Alsace, the region with the biggest share of Lutherans among the overall population. Thus the Église de la Confession d’Augsbourg de France (under this name until 1906) received the basics of its constitution. The chief executive body, the directory (directoire) was also seated in Strasbourg.

The strong parastatalism within consistorial system proved in March 1848, when after overthrowing the monarchy the royalist Lutheran directory was forced into resignation under the accusation of antirepublicanism. The then planned democratisation of the Lutheran bodies did not materialise for the time being. With Louis-Napoléon's takeover the decree of 26 March 1852 streamlined and further centralised the governing body of the church, renaming the General Consistory as Supreme Consistory. Accounting for the population growth and migration (mostly labour migration) new congregations emerged in the former Lutheran Diaspora; therefore the number of Lutheran consistories was increased to 40 by the same decree.

=== Reshape: Lutheran bodies in Alsace-Lorraine forming the EPCAAL ===
After France had declared war on North Germany and invaded its component state of Prussia in 1870 the latter's troops and allied forces had defeated France in 1871 (Franco-German War). By the Treaty of Frankfurt France then ceded Alsace and northeastern Lorraine, becoming the new Alsace-Lorraine. 286,000 French Lutherans and their chief bodies then happened to reside within Unified Germany. The 45,000 Lutherans living in remaining France (la France intérieure), soon growing in number to 80,000 through Lutheran Optants from the annexed areas and other immigrants, had to reorganise their religious community forming new bodies.

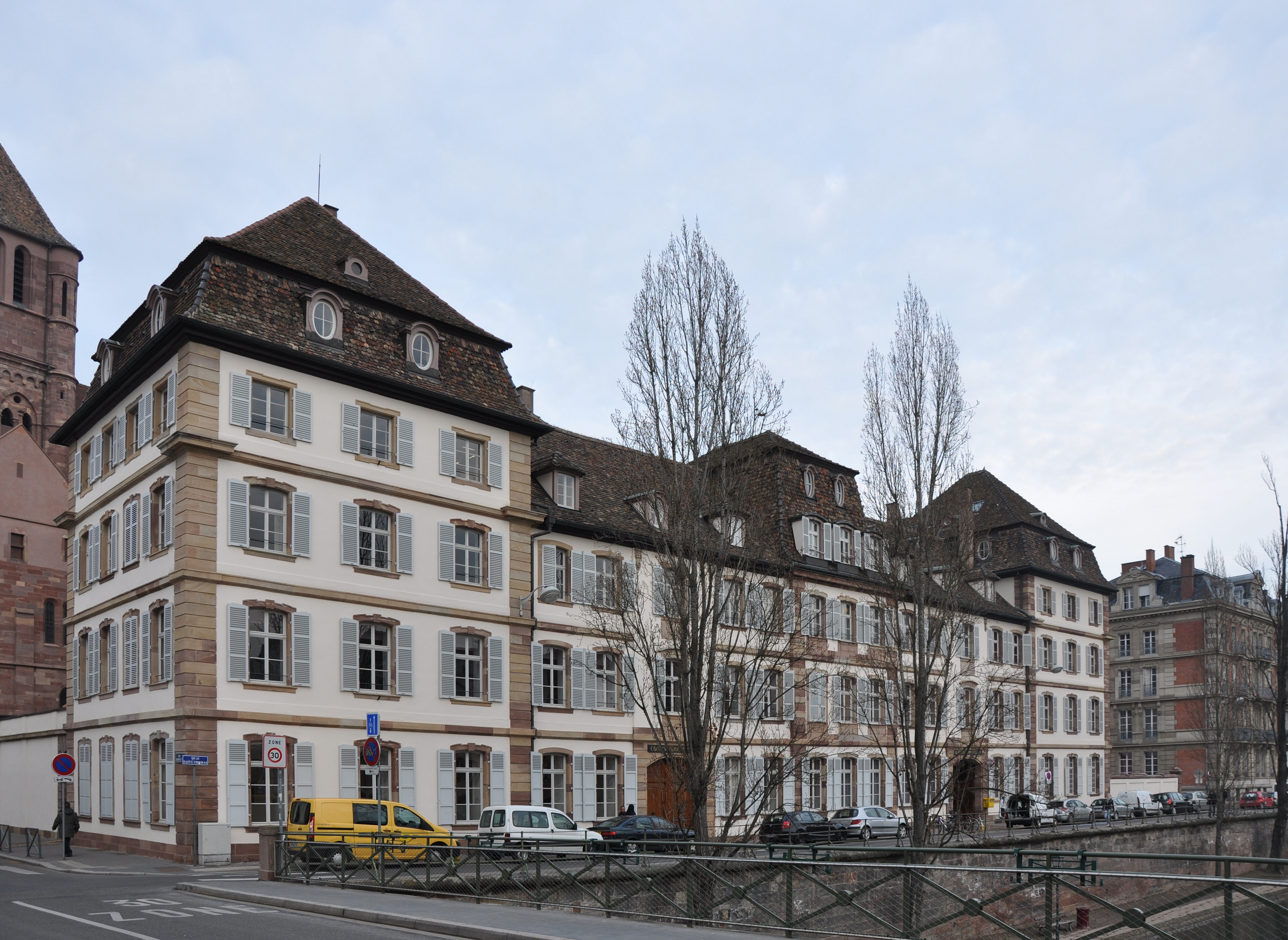
Lutheran Consistoire supérieur (supreme consistory) in Strasbourg, towered by St. Thomas Lutheran Church

The new German administration was very reluctant to alter or pass new laws concerning the religion. Jean-Frédéric Bruch, already since 1849 consistorial councillor in the Supreme Consistory and a member of the Directory since 1866, rendered great service to the Lutheran church during its adaptation to the altered political situation and its transformation into a regionally confined Protestant church within Alsace-Lorraine. Bruch was a member of the interim church directory and pushed through the reconstitution of the Lutheran church in the German-annexed area as the Kirche Augsburgischen Bekenntnisses von Elsass und Lothringen. This smooth transformation was possible since the Supreme Consistory and the Directory were both based in Strasbourg.

With most French Lutherans living in Alsace-Lorraine the church and its parishes remained intact, while the 45,000 Lutherans in interior France were cut off from their central bodies. With the Reformed Church in Alsace-Lorraine the situation was reversed, the 35,000 Calvinists were disconnected from their mainland and central institutions in interior France. Also the three Israelite consistories in the area had been cut off from the Paris-based Central Consistory.

Catholics formed the majority in Alsace-Lorraine but Lutherans, a religious minority, came second before the Calvinists, whereas in interior France this ranking among the Protestants was reversed. In centralist France Calvinists had a certain influence with their vivid and active community in Paris, in Strasbourg Lutherans formed the majority and had their headquarters, while Calvinists were underrepresented there. Thus in Alsace-Lorraine the relative strength of the two Protestant churches was reversed, enforcing Lutheran self-confidence with intact institutions.

Proponents of Calvinism and Judaism then took the endeavour to form new statewide umbrella organisations. But in 1872 Upper President Eduard von Moeller rejected the Calvinist and Jewish proposals, arguing he would interfere as little as possible in the current state of legal affairs of Alsace-Lorraine as long as no Alsace-Lorrainese legislative body were established.

After 1871 many people from interior Germany settled in Alsace-Lorraine, among them rather few Calvinists, because Calvinism is a minority faith among the German Protestants, who then still formed a majority in the German overall population. In all the then three German federal states adjacent to Alsace-Lorraine, Baden, the Bavarian Palatinate and Prussia, the Reformed and Lutheran church bodies had merged, either through a united Protestant confession (Evangelical State Church in Baden as of 1821, Protestant State Church of the Palatinate as of 1817) or in administration only (by way of a united umbrella) maintaining separate confessions in the local congregations (Evangelical State Church of Prussia's older Provinces; united umbrella since 1817). So Protestant officials from interior Germany delegated to posts in Alsace-Lorraine often had no routine with a Reformed and a Lutheran church existing side by side. This caused their expectation for the Reformed and the Lutheran churches in Alsace-Lorraine to unite, especially since the head of state of Alsace-Lorraine, the German Emperor himself, in personal union king of Prussia was as such the supreme governor of the united old-Prussian church body. Also among the Lorrain Calvinists was a strong preference for a united church.

However, the Protestant Church of Augsburg Confession perpetuated its existence with the ambit of its supreme consistory and directory restrained to the congregations in Alsace and the new German Department of Lorraine only.

In the last quarter of the 19th century quarrels over the Catholic joint use of Lutheran (and Reformed) church buildings rose. 120 Lutheran and Reformed church buildings were jointly used for Holy Masses in the 1880s. Between 1903 and 1914 Friedrich Curtius, son of Ernst Curtius, led the EPCAAL as president of the directory. In 1905 he was further elected president of the supreme consistory. Together with Bishop Adolf Fritzen he tried to calm down the quarrels over the simultaneum churches but in vain. Many disputes only ended when the Catholic parishes moved out into new-built Catholic churches. The charitable fund of the Œuvre des églises mixtes enabled the construction of new Catholic churches so that the number of simultaneous uses of Protestant church buildings decreased to 64 cases by 1914.

By the 1911 constitution of Alsace-Lorraine the heads of the établissements publics du culte, of the 1898-formed Calvinist EPRAL, of the two Catholic dioceses, of the community of the three Israelite consistories and of the EPCAAL were ex officio members of the upper house of the parliament of Alsace-Lorraine, the Landtag. After the outbreak of the First World War in 1914 the imperial administration forbade using French as preaching language. Curtius and other church leaders sharply protested at the administration. When it did not revoke the prohibition, Curtius resigned as president of the directory of the EPCAAL in 1914.

=== From 1919 to 1940 ===
According to the ceasefire German troops had to leave Alsace-Lorraine still in November 1918 and French troops, warmly welcomed, captured the territory in the same month. The Landtag continued to govern, but revolutionary revolts were only to be subjected by the French troops. Between 1918 and 1920, the year when the Treaty of Versailles by which Germany ceded Alsace-Lorraine to France became effective, the autonomy continued before the French law was implemented in the reannexed territory.

After much of debate and complaints over the uniformity by which existing law and practice in Alsace-Lorraine would be levelled to French standards, a compromise was found. All French law, never abolished in Alsace-Lorraine, but in France, such as the 1801 concordat and the Organic Articles done away with by the French Law on separating Religion and state in 1905, would continue in Alsace and the Moselle department. Other laws, also newer regulations enacted by the Alsace-Lorrain legislation or the Reichstag, would persist if they were deemed better or without adequate French counterpart replacing them. So the organic articles, the concordat, Bismarck's social security laws (later replaced when French social security developed) became the system of the Local law in Alsace-Moselle. As to Christianity Alsace and Moselle have two more Christian feasts, Good Friday and the 26 December as Second Christmas Day, as public holiday. Also labour on Sundays is much more restrained in Alsace and Moselle than in interior France.

So the EPCAAL – like the Catholic dioceses, the Israelite consistories and the Reformed church – retained its status as établissement public du culte, whereas other religious bodies rank as religious associations in French law. This meant that clergy is paid with government funds, the State University of Strasbourg runs a faculty of Protestant theology, religious instruction is a subject in public schools and denominational schools are allowed. On the other hand, all elected functionaries and pastors of the EPCAAL are to be government-confirmed and can only then be appointed. This legal difference between Alsace and Moselle and interior France prevents the EPCAAL to reunite with the Evangelical Lutheran Church of France (this name as of 1906), which is subject to strict laïcity. After France – in the scope of French centralism – had abolished the parliament of Alsace-Lorraine and many other features of regional autonomous administration the religious communities and the droit local form elements establishing Alsatian and Lorrain identity. In 1927 - after substantial doctrinal quarrels – some congregations split from EPCAAL and form today's Evangelical Lutheran Church – Synod of France and Belgium.

In the Second World War many representatives of French statehood and politics fled Alsace and Lorraine or were evacuated in 1939 and 1940, among them Robert Hœpffner, president of the directory of the EPCAAL, who was exiled in Périgueux like many more EPCAAL pastors.

=== Under German occupation ===
The German occupation started in May 1940 and the occupants subjected Alsace to a Nazi party administration by joining Alsace with Baden through forming the Nazi party Gau Baden-Alsace. The Moselle department became the CdZ-Gebiet Lothringen, to be administered by Nazi officials of the Gau Westmark.

The Nazi administration suspected EPCAAL to be a potential obstacle to the streamlining. So EPCAAL was territorially divided into an Alsatian and a Lorrain branch. The Lutheran congregations in the CdZ-Gebiet Lothringen were assigned to the united Protestant German United Protestant-Evangelical-Christian Church of the Palatinate, a synod governed by a majority of proponents of the so-called Movement of German Christians. The Alsatian rump of the Lutheran church with its supreme consistory and directory was reconstituted as the Evangelical Lutheran Regional Church of Alsace (Evangelisch-lutherische Landeskirche des Elsass). On 26 June 1940 the Nazi administration appointed Charles Maurer, Pastor in Schwindratzheim, as acting president of the directory. He had earlier been the editor of the weekly «Friedensbote» and active within the movement of Alsatian autonomists. After the outbreak of the war in 1939 the French government had interned him and other autonomists in Arches, from where he was released when the French forces withdrew into interior France. In 1941 the Nazi administration repealed the Organic Articles, stopped salarying the pastors, closed the denominational schools, forbade religious instruction in public schools and confiscated the estates of religious associations and foundations. The status as établissement public du culte was repealed too and the church turned into a mere private association, similar to the legal situation of the churches in the Warthegau.

With support by the Martin Luther Federation and aided by the Nazi-opposing Confessing Church movement the Alsatian Lutheran church could prevent its incorporation into the Protestant Reich Church. The Alsatian Lutheran church smarted from shortage of funds and pastors, of whom many were exiled in interior France. Under Maurer the church could carry on the work of several expropriated charitable associations and endowments, however, under restrictive conditions. The remaining pastors tried to compensate the shortage of clergy by copying preaches then read by laymen from the pulpits (so-called Lesepredigten) and pupils got religious instruction in newly formed Sunday school courses. Collegial bodies, like the Alsatian Lutheran consistories, were replaced by deaneries (Dekanate) supervised by one-man hierarchies following the Führerprinzip.

In order to escape the supervision by the Gestapo, important items were not discussed anymore in the official church bodies but in spontaneously formed unofficial circles (such as the Pfarrkonvente, pastors' conventions). Maurer succeeded to rescue the personal belongings left behind by exiled pastors and professors from being seized by the occupants. When the occupation force offered Maurer to restitute the Catholic Strasbourg Cathedral for Lutheran service Maurer refused recognising this proposal as attempt to rule and divide the Alsatian denominations. When the combat actions reached Alsace in late 1944 Maurer resigned from church leadership. On 1 May 1945 Hœpffner resumed his office and EPCAAL resumed existence including the Lutheran congregations in Moselle. In 1947 Maurer was arrested and sentenced as collaborationist in the following year.

=== Since 1945 ===
After the Second World War French authorities again aimed at levelling the regional peculiarities in Alsace-Moselle, however, the plans never materialised. Since 1905 strict laïcité is the organising principle in most of France, whereas the previously recognised religious communities of the Calvinists, Catholics, Jews, and Lutherans in Alsace-Moselle preserved their concordatary status of the period between 1802 and 1904 including the Organic Articles. So EPCAAL, like the other afore-mentioned communities, enjoys government cofinancing of denominational schools, the faculty of Protestant theology at the Strasbourg University, which anyway had emerged from the former Lutheran academy of Strasbourg, is used by students to become theologians or pastors and its professors of theology are appointed with consent of the church.

Therefore, the EPCAAL cannot merge with the new Evangelical Lutheran Church of France unless the EPCAAL would waive its concordatary status, which also provides for the clergy being paid by the government and Lutheran pupils in public schools entitled to participate in religious instruction classes following EPCAAL guidelines. In the 21st century still about 50 Protestant churches in Alsace-Moselle are co-used for Catholic masses as provided by the decree of 1684.

== Organisation ==
The EPCAAL has its headquarters in Strasbourg. The Church has a presbyterial-synodal system of church government. The legislative body of EPCAAL is the supreme consistory, consisting of elected and ex officio members. Before formally taking on office each member is to be appointed, and thus confirmed by the French prime minister. The central executive body is the directory.

=== Ecclesiastical inspections and consistories ===
According to the Organic Articles the 208 congregations (paroisses, literally parishes) of the EPCAAL (as of 2005) are grouped in 40 consistories, terming the board and its district alike. The consistories are établissements publics des cultes too, each disposing of property of its own and receiving contributions by the member parishes. Each consistory comprises all the pastors active in its district and the double number of laypersons, elected in three year terms by the local church presbyteries, as well as some members coöpted by the church executive Directory. The consistorial members elect from their midst their executive, the consistorial council (Conseil consistorial) of four members.

Consistorial decisions are presented to the French minister of the Interior, who may oppose them within a two-months period, and reported to the superior EPCAAL Supreme consistory (Consistoire supérieur). The 40 consistories form again part of seven ecclesiastical inspections (inspections ecclésiastiques), seated in Bouxwiller (Lower Alsace), Brumath, Colmar (Upper Alsace), Dorlisheim, La Petite-Pierre, Strasbourg and Wissembourg in Alsace.

=== Presidents of the directory ===
The presidents of the directory (French: président du directoire) and their vice presidents are ex officio members of the supreme consistory. Furthermore, the president is ex officio president of the Lutheran Chapter at St. Thomas in Strasbourg (Chapitre de Saint-Thomas; confirmed on 29 November 1873). Presidents of the directory were:

- 1871: Théodore Braun, président du directoire of the Église de la Confession d'Augsbourg de France (since 1850), resigned
  - 1871–1872: Jean-Frédéric Bruch, per pro
- 1872–1886: Jean Louis Édouard Kratz), titled Präsident des Direktoriums
- 1885–1903: Christian Frédéric Petri (a.k.a. Christian Friedrich Petri), Präsident des Direktoriums
- 1903–1914: Friedrich Curtius, Präsident des Direktoriums
- 1914–1920: Johann Freiherr von der Goltz (a.k.a. Hans von der Goltz; 1864–1941), Präsident des Direktoriums, then consistorial president of APU's Rhenish Ecclesiastical Province from 1920 till his dismissal in 1933
- 1920–1938: Frédéric Ernwein (a.k.a. Friedrich Ernwein, 1865–1952), président du directoire
- 1938–1940: Robert Hœpffner (1882–1972), suspended during the German occupation from 1940 to 1945;
  - 1940–1944: Charles Maurer (a.k.a. Karl Maurer), per pro
- 1945–1954: Robert Hœpffner
- 1954–1974: Étienne Jung
- 1974–1987: André Appel (1921–2007)
- 1987–1997: Michel Hoeffel
- 1997–2003: Marc Lienhard
- 2003–2013: Jean-François Collange (resignation announced for December)
- 2014- : Christian Albecker (elected October 2013)
