= Evangelical Reformed Church of the Canton Basel-Landschaft =

Coordinates: 47.5560°N 7.5928°E

The Evangelical-Reformed Church of the Canton Basel-Landschaft is a Reformed cantonal church in the canton of Basel-Landschaft, which does not include the eponymous city. In 2004, it had 113,537 members, 35 parishes, and 65 ordained clergy. It is a member of the Federation of Swiss Protestant Churches. Women's ordination is allowed.
