= Eduard von Möller =

Prussian politician (1814–1880)

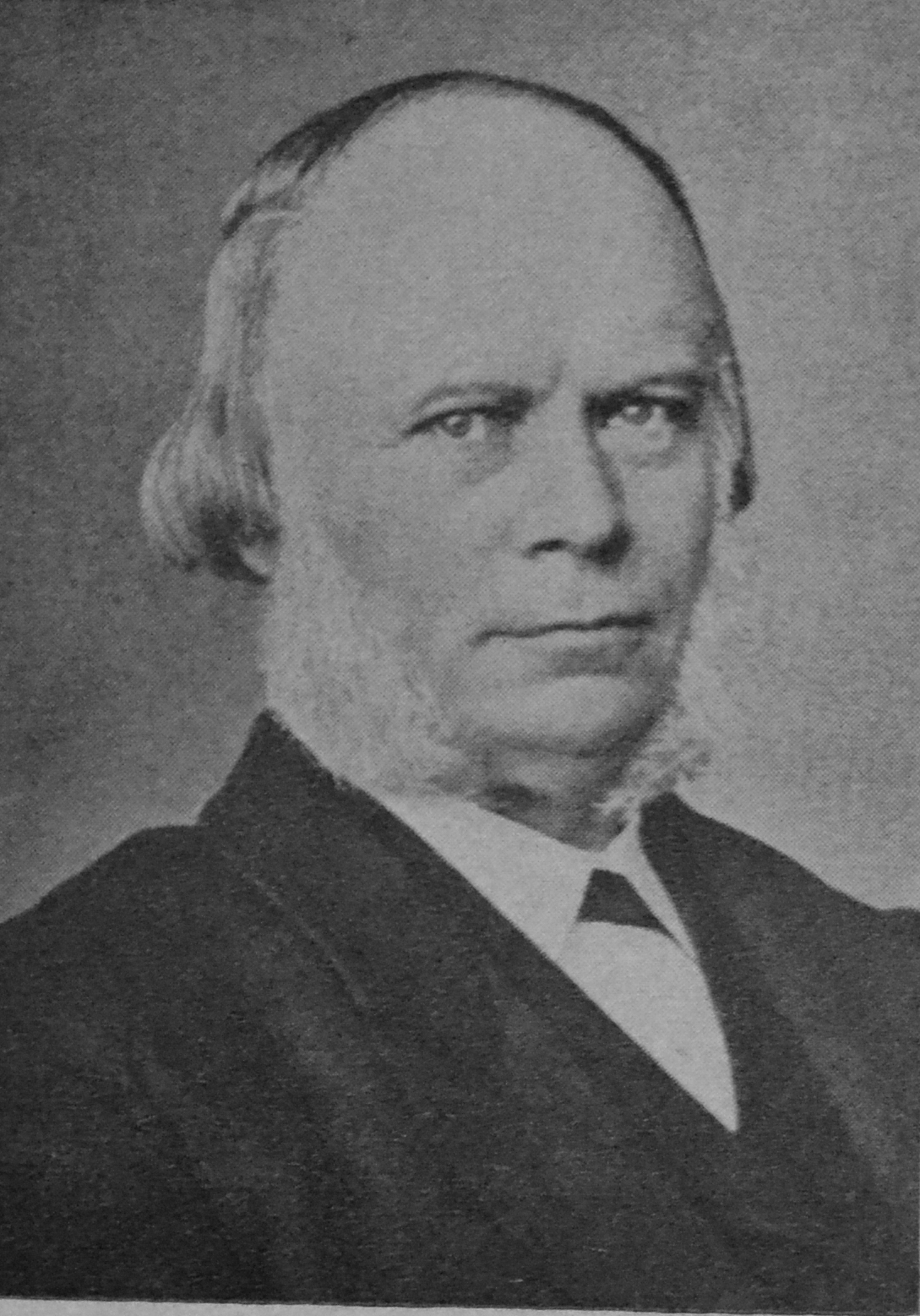

Oberpräsident of Hesse-Nassau
- In office 1867–1871
- Monarch: Wilhelm I

Oberpräsident of Alsace-Loraine
- In office 1871–1879
- Monarch: Wilhelm I

Personal details
- Born: 3 June 1814
- Died: 2 November 1880 (aged 66)

Eduard von Möller (also spelled Moeller; 3 June 1814 – 2 November 1880) was a Prussian politician. He was Oberpräsident of Province of Hesse-Nassau from 1867 to 1871. He later became Oberpräsident of Alsace–Lorraine from 1871 until the office was replaced by the office of Reichsstatthalter in 1879.
