= Union of Protestant Churches of Alsace and Lorraine =

French protestant organisation

The Union of Protestant Churches of Alsace and Lorraine (French: Union des Églises protestantes d'Alsace et de Lorraine, UEPAL; German: Die Union der Protestantischen Kirchen von Elsass und Lothringen; Alsatian: D' Union vu da Protäschtàntischa Kìrcha vum Elsàss ùn Lothringa) was created in 2006 by bringing together the Protestant Church of Augsburg Confession of Alsace and Lorraine (EPCAAL) and the Protestant Reformed Church of Alsace and Lorraine (EPRAL).

While the new body is not a united church, it provides a common decision-making structure and a single body of pastors. The church claims 250,000 members.

== Overview ==
The Union was established by virtue of a decree of 18 April 2006. It was celebrated on 7 May 2006 with a special service at St. Thomas Church in Strasbourg.

It has the responsibility for organizing joint activities and strengthening relations between the two constitutive churches in Alsace and the department of Moselle in Lorraine.

UEPAL totals some 250,000 church members, served by 250 pastors. About 80% belong to EPCAAL, with the remaining 20% belonging to EPRAL. The two churches keep their own structures and retain separate membership in international organizations. Both are members of the Protestant Federation of France (FPF).

UEPAL normally holds two assemblies each year, in June and November. At the first assembly in 2006, the former Dean of the Faculty of Protestant Theology of the University of Strasbourg and President of EPCAAL, Jean-François Collange, was elected president. The term of office is three years. In 2009 Collange was elected for a second term. In 2012 he announced that he would be standing down at the end of 2013.

In June 2013, the UEPAL announced that it was studying the issue of blessings for unions of same-sex couples. The churches decided to consider the study, which would last for three years, and the issue at the assembly in 2017. In November 2019, UEPAL allowed the blessing of the same sex marriages.
