= Evangelical Lutheran Church in France =

Lutheran denominaion in France

Evangelical Lutheran Church in France (French: Église évangélique luthérienne en France) was a Lutheran denomination in France until its 2013 merger with the Reformed Church of France to form the United Protestant Church of France. It had 100,000 members at the time of the merger.

It covered all of France except for Alsace and Moselle. In those areas the Protestant Church of Augsburg Confession of Alsace and Lorraine is the governing Lutheran denomination.
