= Religious association =

The 1905 French law on the Separation of the Churches and the State instituted in France (at the time without the Alsace-Lorraine, where the law does not apply) of religious associations also say parochial or sometimes in some churches, presbyteries, and even today Islamic associations.

These associations are non-profit associations, according to the law in 1901, but with certain limitations: only object of worship and education of their ministers, only individual members (not Association member), minimum number of members etc.. and some benefits, including tax.

== History ==
The 1905 law made it possible for the religious associations "to take care of their expenses, maintenance and public exercise of their religion" so they could perform all the missions previously performed only by the four religions recognized by the government constituted under the law of April 8, 1802 (The Catholic, the Lutheran and the Reformed Churches and the Jewish Synagogue). An independent legal entity was needed indeed in order for these religious associations to acquire a property and buildings to be made available for public worship and with respect the public exercise of worship only. This included also the exercise of worship such as the maintenance of the places of worship, the receiving of donations, and the remuneration and the training of ministers. These religious associations are sole responsible for the theological education of their ministers and for the content of their theological training which reflect their belief system. (association cultuelle 1905)

Catholicism refused to apply the law in 1905 (It would create later the diocesan associations.) Judaism retained its past structures with Israelite consistories. The Protestant churches thus form the vast majority of religious associations, the associative model presenting the obvious parallels with their traditional presbyterial system of organization.

The being and mission of these churches are not yet exhausted in these associations: they had to establish, among themselves or together with other associations only 1901 law that allows them to exercise including self-help and Mission.

== Legal system ==
=== Declaration of a religious association ===
Any association may be declared in the prefecture as an association of worship under the law of December 9, 1905, the Republic does not recognize any religion. The prefect may nevertheless initiate subsequent action for annulment with the Court of First Instance, if the association pursues an unlawful purpose.

=== Legal value of the term cult ===
However the term cult does not carry legal force at the time of the declaration of the association. As recalled by the Minister of Interior (in charge of the Central Bureau of Religious Affairs) to prefects it is only when the administration gives him the benefit of tax advantages as a religious association under the 1905 Act, its nature of worship is regularly recognized.

=== Prerequisites ===
The administrative law has established three requirements so that an association can be considered religious under the law of December 9, 1905:

- It must be devoted to the exercise of religion.
- Its purpose must be exclusively religious. It should therefore be limited to the following activities: the celebration of ceremonies for the fulfillment of people united by a common religious belief, some rites or practices; the acquisition, leasing, construction, l 'development and maintenance of buildings used for worship, as well as maintenance and training of ministers and other persons contributing to the exercise of the religion. Thus are excluded cultural activities, publishing, social or humanitarian, that must eventually be another association nonprofit (Act 1 July 1901).
- Its statutory purpose as its actual activity must not undermine public order. The fact that an association has been the subject of various convictions for serious and willful violations of law may prevent the benefit status of religious association to other associations connected to the same religion, and operating in close liaison with this one In contrast, the only qualification of "sectarian movement" given by parliamentary reports does not justify any disturbance of public order

=== Prefectural control ===
Under the new wording of Article 910 of the Civil Code the acceptance of gifts and bequests is not subject to prior approval by prefectural order. Any religious association is authorized to receive gifts and bequests, with reporting obligations to the administrative authority, which retains an opponent power retrospectively. Are explicitly excluded from these provisions "associations and foundations whose activities or those of their leaders are referred to in Article 1 of the Act of June 12, 2001 to strengthen the prevention and repression of sectarian movements affecting the human rights and fundamental freedoms ".

The same applies for the purposes of sections 200 and 238b of the General Tax Code, which allows patrons of religious associations to deduct a certain percentage of their payments to a certain limit of their income.

== Bibliography ==
- Proceedings of the symposium "News of religious associations: Should we change the law of separation of church and state? "(National Assembly, November 24, 1995), Les Petites Affiches, 1 May 1996, No. 53.
- Gilles BACHELOR, Conclusions of the government commissioner, Journal of Public Law and Political Science in France and abroad, 2000, No. 6, pp. 1839–1849.
- Sophie BOISSARD, "Conditions for the refusal of the status of religious association to association," Conclusions of the Government Commissioner, The Legal News - Administrative Law, 2004, p. 1367.
- Alain Boyer and Michel Brisacier, "The religious associations and congregations" in "The State and Religion", Administration, No. 161, October / December 1993, pp. 65–79.
- Alain Boyer, "The prefectural government and worship," Book Law and Religion, No. 1, 2005, pp. 13–19.
- Brisacier Michel, "The State Council said the criteria of the cult," Administration, No. 177, 1997, pp. 91–93.
- Thierry DAUPS, "Public Order and religious associations", Yearbook Law and Religion, No. 1, 2005, pp. 129–147.
- Xavier Delsol, Alain GARAY, Emmanuel Tawil, Law Religion - People, activities, goods and structures, associations, Juris Publishing, Lyon, 2005.
- Alain Garay and Philippe GONI Note Court Administrative Journal of Public Law and Political Science in France and abroad, 2000, No. 6, pp. 1825–1837.
- Gerard Gonzalez, "Jehovah's Witnesses can they establish religious associations? "Journal of French administrative law, January–February 1998, pp. 61-73.
- Gerard Gonzalez, "Jehovah's Witnesses may establish religious associations", Quarterly Journal of Human Rights, No. 2001/48, pp. 1208-1219.
- Mattias Guyomar and Pierre Collin, "General Chronicle of French administrative law - Contributions and taxes", The Legal News - Administrative Law, 20 juillet/20 August 2000, pp. 597–602, 671, 672.
- Ministry of Interior (Directorate of Civil Liberties and Legal Affairs), circular of December 20, 1999, on "Fight against the reprehensible acted sectarian movements" (Int. 9900262C).
- Caroline Leclerc, "The status of religious association and sects," French Review of Administrative Law, May–June 2005, pp. 565–576.
- Hocine SADOK, "Cults and religious associations," Administrative Law, November 1998, pp. 7–11.

== See also ==
- 1905 French law on the Separation of the Churches and the State
- Full text of the law of December 9, 1905, on Wikisource
- Jehovah's Witnesses and governments
