= List of Christian denominations in India =

The Church of the East was the earliest form of Christianity in India, as adopted by the St Thomas Christians of the Malabar region (present-day Kerala) from at least the third century, and possibly much earlier. (Note: By long-held tradition, Malabar Christianity began in 52 AD. Although not confirmable, this early date is a canonical belief for St Thomas Christians; nothing in historical sources rules out such an ancient beginning.) This diversified into different churches over time. Later, from the 17th century, the Catholic and Eastern Orthodox churches, and Protestant denominations were introduced, brought by European missionaries and colonisers.

== A ==
- All Nations Ministries Villivakkam
- Aaradhanalaya Church of India
- Advent Christian Conference
- Amazing Grace Ministries
- Andhra Evangelical Lutheran Church
- Anglican Church of India (Continuing Anglican)
- Apatani Christian Fellowship
- Apostolic Christian Assembly
- Apostolic Church of Pentecost
- Apostolic Evangelical Church of India
- ASMD New Anglican Synod
- Anglican Church of India
- Arise and Shine Missionary Diocese
- Apostolic Fellowship Tabernacle
- Apostolic Pentecostal Church
- Apostolic Trinity Ministries
- Asia Evangelistic Fellowship
- Assam Baptist Convention
- Assemblies Jehovah Shammah
- Assemblies of Christ Church
- Assemblies of God
- Assemblies of Jesus Christ
- Assembly Hall Churches
- Assembly of Believers Church
- Association of Vineyard Churches
- Assyrian Church of the East

== B ==
- BIBLE MISSION FOUNDED BY ST.DEVADAS IN 1936
- Baptist Christian Association
- Baptist Church of Mizoram
- Baptist Union of North India
- Bengal Baptist Fellowship
- Believers Eastern Church
- Bengal-Orissa-Bihar Baptist Convention
- Bethany Fellowship Ministries
- Bethel Pentecostal Church
- Bharatiya Jukta Christa Prachar Mandali
- Bible Brethren Fellowship
- Bible Christian Mission
- Bible Pattern Church
- Bible Presbyterian Church
- Biblical Church Indian Synod of Dioceses
- Bihar Mennonite Mandli
- Bible Faith Lutheran Church of India
- Blessing Youth Mission
- Brethren in Christ Church in India
- Bro Bakht Singh Assemblies(All over the World)
- Brethren Assembly (All over the World)

== C ==
- Cachar Hill Tribes Synod
- Carmel Gospel Missions
- Catholic Church
  - Roman Catholic Church (Latin rite)
  - Syro-Malabar Catholic Church
  - Syro-Malankara Catholic Church
- Chaldean Syrian Church
- Christ Groups
- Christadelphians
- Christian Believers' Assembly Fellowship, Kota(Raj.)
- Christian Congregation in India
- Christian Fellowship Centre
- Christian Mission Church International (CMCI)
- CHRISTIAN CHURCH
- Christian Revival Church
- Church Of Episcopal Fellowship International Diocese (CEFI Diocese)
- Church of God (Anderson)
- Church of God (Full Gospel) in India
- Church of God of Prophecy
- Church of God (Seventh Day)
- Church of North India
- Church of South India
- Church of the Apostolic Faith
- Church of the Nazarene
- Churches of Christ
- Churches of Christ in Western India
- Churches of Christ (Instrumental)
- Churches of Christ (Non-Instrumental)
- Council of Reformed Churches in India
- Congregational Church of India (Maraland)
- Celtic Cross Ministries India

== D ==
- Deliverance City Church
- Diocese of Cosmopolis
- Disciples of Christ
- Divyadarshana Ministries
- Dohnavur Fellowship
- Dwarka Christian Fellowship

== E ==
- Eastern Orthodox
  - Greek Orthodox
  - Russian Orthodox
- Elim Church
- Elite Jesus Ministries Welfare Society
- El Shaddai
- Ecumenical Catholic Church of Christ in India
- Episcopal Church Diocese of India Council
- Eternal Light Ministries
- Eternal Life International Ministries
- Evangelical Alliance of Churches
- Evangelical Church of India
- Evangelical Church of Maraland
- Evangelical Congregational Church
- Evangelical Free Church of India
- Evangelical Missionary Society in Mayurbhanj
- Evangelical Presbyterian Church of Sikkim
- Eternal rock ministry

== F ==
- Fellowship of Evangelical Friends
- Fellowship of Gospel Churches
- Fellowship of Indigenous Gospel Churches
- Filadelfia Fellowship Church of India
- Free Methodist Church of India
- Friends Missionary Prayer Band
- Faith Gospel Mission Kerala
- Faith Gospel Mission (FGM)

== G ==
Garment India Ministries

- Garo Baptist Convention
- Good News Mission (Apostle.M. Rajendran)
- Gospel Association of India
- Gospel Echoing Missionary Society
- Geoffrey Ministries Chennai Tamil Nadu
- Gospel Outreach Ministries
- Gypsy Evangelical Movement
- Global Christian Church Of India
- Grace of God Ministries
- Greek Orthodox Church
- Gossner Evangelical Lutheran Church in Chotanagpur and Assam

== H ==
- Harvest Church India
- Hebron church Of Almighty God
- Hebron Missionary Fellowship
- HERMON CHURCH MINISTRY
- Himalaya Evangelical Mission
- Himalayan Free Church
- Hindustani Covenant Church
- Highland churches of India
- House of Prayer Fellowship
- Holy Almighty God Ministries
- Holy Way Ministries Trust
- Hosanna ministries
- Holy ministries
- HOLY MOUNTAIN PRAYER FELLOWSHIP

== I ==
- Immanuel India Mission
- Immanuel Pentecostal Assembly
- Independent Assemblies of God, International
- Independent Baptist Ministries Of India
- Independent Church of India
- India Association of General Baptists
- India for Christ Ministries
- India United Evangelical Mission
- India Evangelistic Mission
- Indian Brethren
- Indian Evangelical Team(IET-New Delhi)
- Indian National Church
- Indian National Full Gospel Churches Federation of India
- India Pentecostal Assembly(Full Gospel)
- Indian Pentecostal Mission
- Indian Pentecostal Church of God
- International Christian Fellowship
- International Church of the Foursquare Gospel
- India Evangelical Lutheran Church
- India Evangelical Lutheran Church IELC
- Indian missionaries society

== J ==
- Jesus Evangelical Mission
- Jesus with us Revival Church (Rev. Dr. P.Charles )
- Jehovah's Witnesses
- Jehovah Salvation Church
- Jeypore Evangelical Lutheran Church
- Jesus Mariya Christeen ministries
- Jesus Army Mission

== K ==
- Karbi-Anglong Baptist Convention
- Karnataka Baptist Convention
- Kashmir Evangelical Fellowship
- Kuki Christian Church
- Knanaya
- Kingdom of god Mission (Gujarat, Dharampur)

== L ==
- Lambsaved Ministries
- Latin Catholic Church
- Local Churches of India
- Life Boat Church
- London Mission Church
- Lord Jesus Christ Tabernacle
- Laymen's Evangelical Fellowship
- Lutheran

Logos Faith Foundation

== M ==
- Madras Pentecostal Assembly (Tamil)
- Mahanaim Christian Mission (Assembly of Holy God church)
- Mahaneh Dan Fellowship
- Maranatha gospel church
- Maranatha Ministries International
- Manipur Baptist Convention
- Mara Independent Evangelical Church
- Maranatha Full Gospel Churches
- Mennonite Church in India
- Methodist Church in India
- Metropolitan Church Association
- Mission Society of Mar Gregorios of India
- Mission India
- Moravian Church
- Malankara Evangelical Church

== N ==
- New Creation Family Church
- Nagaland Baptist Church Council
- National Missionary Society of India
- Native Missionary Movement
- Navajeeva Ashram
- National Church of India
- National Church of India Missionary Diocese of Kerala
- New India Bible Church
- New India Church Of God
- New Life Church of God
- New Life Churches
- New Life Fellowship Association
- New Life Outreach
- New Testament Church of India
- North Bank Baptist Christian Association
- Northern Evangelical Lutheran Church
- North India Tribal Mission
- North Western Gossner Evangelical Lutheran Church

== O ==
- Open Bible Church of God
- Orissa Missionary Movement
- Orissa Baptist Evangelistic Crusade
- Oriental Orthodox Churches
  - Malankara Orthodox Syrian Church
  - Jacobite Syrian Orthodox Church
  - Malankara Marthoma Syrian Church
  - Malabar Independent Syrian Church
  - Armenian Apostolic Orthodox Church

== P ==
- Pentecostal Free Will Baptist Church
- Pentecostal Holiness Church
- Pontifical Global Church Federation
- Presbyterian Church of India
- Prince of Peace Church
- Protestent

== R ==
- RAIPUR CHRISTIAN CHURCH
- Rabha Baptist Church Union
- Reaching Indians Ministries
- Rajasthan Bible Institute
- Reformed Episcopal Church
- Reformed Presbyterian Church of India
- Reformed Presbyterian Church North East India
- Rongmei Baptist Churches Council (formerly, Rongmei Naga Baptist Association)

== S ==
- St Thomas Evangelical Church of India
- Salvation Light Ministries
- Separate Baptists in Christ
- Seventh Day Baptist Church
- Seventh-day Adventist Church
- South India Reformed Churches
- Saron Bethel Deva Sabai
- Sharon fellowship church
- Shekinah Assembly
- Suvartha full gospel church
- Salvation Army of Roman Catholic
- salvation army SHALOM TEMPLE
- SMYRNA Theological UNIVERSITY
- Synod of Independent Pentecostal Church (SIPCT KERALA)

== T ==
- Tamil Baptist Churches
- Tamil Christian Fellowship
- Telugu Baptist Church
- The Church of Jesus Christ of Latter-day Saints in India
- The Salvation Army
- St. Mari Church Of India
- The Pentecostal Mission
- Tribal Gospel Mission
- Tripura Baptist Christian Union
- Tamil Evangelical Lutheran Church
- The Santal Mission of the Northern Churches
- The Living Evangelical Fellowship
- The Worldwide Anglican Church of India
- Tirunelveli C.M.S. Evangelical Church

== U ==
- Undenominational Church of the Lord in India
- Union of Evangelical Students of India
- United Basel Mission Church
- United Evangelical Lutheran Church in India
- United Missionary Church of India
- United Pentecostal Church in India
- United Church of North India (UCNI)
- United Christ Covenant Church (UCCCM)

== V ==
- Vishwasi Mandir (Aatmik Vishwavidyalaya)

== W ==
- Wesleyan Church of India

== Y ==
- Yeshuva Evangelical Church

== Z ==
- Zeme Baptist Church Council

== See also ==
- List of Christian denominations in North East India
- Christian Revival Church
- Christianity in India

== Bibliography ==
- Barrett, David B.; Kurian, George Thomas; Johnson, Todd M., eds. (2001). World Christian encyclopedia: A comparative survey of churches and religions in the modern world. Vol. 1: The world by countries: religionists, churches, ministries (2nd ed.). Oxford; New York: Oxford University Press. ISBN 978-0-19-507963-0.
