= Reformed and Presbyterian Fellowship of India =

Indian ecumenical organization

- Type: Fellowship
- Classification: Protestant
- Orientation: Confessionally Reformed
- Origin: 2001; 24 years ago
- Members: 86,132
- Places of worship: 817

The Reformed and Presbyterian Fellowship of India is a national ecumenical organization, bringing together Presbyterian and Continental Reformed churches in India.

It was formed in 2001 and in 2019 it was formed by 14 member denominations.

== History ==
In 1969, the Reformed Presbyterian Church of India established the Dehradun Presbyterian Theological Seminary, which, unlike other Presbyterian theological institutions in India, rejected Theological liberalism and subscribed to the Westminster Confession of Faith.

In the following decades, various Presbyterian and Continental Reformed denominations began to send their pastors for seminary training.

This training of pastors of various denominations in the same seminary led to a rapprochement between them and the formation of the Reformed and Presbyterian Fellowship of India in 2001.

== Members ==
In 2019, Fellowship members were:

denominational subfamily	Denomination	Communion	Number of congregations	Number of members	Year
Presbyterians	Evangelical Presbyterian Church of Sikkim	-	120	61,000	2018
Presbyterians	Reformed Presbyterian Church North East India	WCRC and WFR and ICRC	105	11,376	2021
Presbyterians	Presbyterian Church in India (Reformed)	WRF	50	10,000	2015
Presbyterians	Reformed Presbyterian Church of India	WRF and ICRC	10	3,000	2004
Presbyterians	Presbyterian Church in South India	-	70	-	2020
Presbyterians	Free Presbyterian Church, Kalimpong	-	47	-	2018
Presbyterians	Presbyterian Free Church of Central India	ICRC	18	756	2021
Presbyterians	Presbyterian Reformed Church in India	WRF	10	-	2022
Continental reformed	Christian Reformed Fellowship of India	WRF	300	-	2019
Continental reformed	Evangelical Reformed Church of India	WRF and CIIR	84	-	2022
Continental reformed	South India Reformed Churches	-	3	-	
Continental reformed	Protestant Reformed Church (India) (Note: mission of the United Reformed Churches in North America)	-	-	-	-
Continental reformed	Reformed Covenant Assembly (India) (Note: mission of the Protestant Reformed Churches in America)	-	-	-	-
Continental reformed	Reformed Churches in South Africa	-	-	-	-
Total			817	86,132	2004-2024
