= Reformed and Presbyterian Churches Fellowship in Myanmar =

- Type: Fellowship
- Classification: Protestant
- Orientation: Confessionally Reformed
- Associations: World Reformed Fellowship
- Origin: 2005; 21 years ago
- Members: 21,500
- Places of worship: 187

The Reformed and Presbyterian Churches Fellowship in Myanmar (RPCFM) is a national ecumenical organization, bringing together Presbyterian and continental reformed Protestants incorporated in Myanmar.

== History ==
In 2005, a group of 10 Presbyterian and Continental Reformed denominations created the Reformed and Presbyterian Churches Fellowship in Myanmar (RPCFM).

In 2008, the Society applied to join International Conference of Reformed Churches (ICRC). However, membership was not approved by the ICRC.

In addition, the organization has established contact with the Reformed Churches in the Netherlands (Liberated).

By 2013, the organization became a member of World Reformed Fellowship (WRF), as well as most of its member churches.

Some of its member denominations are also part of the World Communion of Reformed Churches (WCRC).

== Members ==
In 2008, there were 10 members of the Fraternity:

denominational subfamily	Denomination	Communion	Number of congregations	Number of members	Year
Presbyterians	Reformed Presbyterian Church in Myanmar	WCRC and WRF	35	2,500	2021
Presbyterians	Evangelical Presbyterian Church in Myanmar	WCRC	33	5,000	2004
Presbyterians	Biblical Presbyterian Church of Myanmar	-	-	-	-
Presbyterians	Covenant Reformed Presbyterian Church of Myanmar	-	-	-	-
Continental reformed	Christian Reformed Church in Myanmar	WCRC and WRF	50	5,000	2004
Continental reformed	Reformed Evangelical Church of Myanmar	WRF	40	7,000	2010
Continental reformed	United Reformed Church in Myanmar	-	25	2,000	2005
Continental reformed	Reformed Community Church of Myanmar	WRF	-	-	-
Continental reformed	Reformed Churches of Myanmar	WRF	-	-	-
Reformed baptist	Reformed Baptist Churches in Myanmar	-	-	-	-
Total			187	21,500	2004-2024
