= Protestantism in Myanmar =

Protestants in Myanmar make up 5% of that nation's population in 2023. Most Christians are from the minority ethnic groups such as Karen, Lisu, Kachin, Chin, and Lahu. An estimated 0.1% of the Bamar population is Christian.

== History ==
Protestant Christianity in Myanmar began in the early 19th century, largely through the missionary efforts of the Americans Adoniram and Ann Judson, Baptist missionaries who first arrived in 1813. Later, missionaries such as Arthur and Laura Carson, also Baptist missionaries from America, established work in the Chin Hills in 1899. By the 1920s, missionaries of the Assemblies of God brought Pentecostalism to the northern parts of modern-day Myanmar, among the Lisu people; Lisu evangelists would continue to spread Pentecostalism among the Kachin and, since the 1970s, among the Chin.

In 1966, all missionaries were expelled by the Burmese government. Protestantism is strongest among minority ethnic groups, often juxtaposed against the Bamar majority ethnic group who tend to be Buddhists.

== Denominations ==
Baptists, Assemblies of God, Methodists and Anglicans form the strongest denominations in Myanmar.

=== Anglicanism ===
The Anglican Communion is represented in Burma by the Church of the Province of Myanmar. As of 2006, it has about 62,000 members.

=== Baptist ===
The Myanmar Baptist Convention is an association of Baptist churches in Myanmar.

The famous American Baptist missionaries, Adoniram and Ann Judson, moved to Yangon in 1813 when British authorities refused to allow them to stay in India. The Judsons were in Burma six years before their first convert was baptised. Adoniram Judson gathered a group of believers and laboured under many trials, but his missionary tenure of almost 40 years helped firmly establish the Baptist work in Myanmar. His monumental work included translating the Bible into Burmese, which was completed in 1834. George Dana Boardman began a work among the Karen peoples in 1828. Today, the Karen Baptist Convention is the largest member body of the Myanmar Baptist Convention, which was formed in 1865.

HIV/AIDS is a significant problem in Myanmar. In 1992, the Baptist Convention created a 32-member AIDS commission because they see the problem as spiritual, as well as social and medical.

In Myanmar about 6% of the population is Christian, with two-thirds of them being considered Protestant. Almost half of these Protestants are Baptists. In 2012, the convention had over 1.6 million members in 4929 churches. The Myanmar Baptist Convention has 18 affiliated conventions and two directly affiliated local churches under its umbrella, and is a member of the World Council of Churches and the Baptist World Alliance.

During 5–8 December 2013 Myanmar Baptist Convention celebrated its 200th anniversary arrival of missionary Judson. They are actively planning to evangelise all the unreached people groups of it and plant as many as 1200 churches in their project entitled: Golden Myanmar Baptist Mission, Second Decade (2014–2024).

The convention operates the Myanmar Institute of Theology, the leading Christian seminary in Myanmar, founded in 1927 and located in Insein.

=== Methodist Church ===
The British Methodist Missionary Society travelled to Upper Myanmar in 1887 and established a church in Mandalay. The Upper Myanmar Methodist Church became an autonomous church in 1964. Methodists established several schools (including the Methodist English High School in Yangon) mainly to educate the Anglo-Burmese and British. The school exists to this day and is now known as Dagon State High School; it is still attached to the Methodist Church.

The United Methodist Church works with the Lower Myanmar Methodist Church, which was founded by American Methodist missionaries in 1870. There have been discussions about merging with the church in Upper Myanmar, as they already conduct joint missions. The church concentrates on leadership development through scholarships and continuing education. It also provides a home for the elderly, helps youth develop job skills, cares for orphans and provides environmental education.

Many Myanmar refugees in Malaysia now attend Damansara Utama Methodist Church, which is a charismatic-Methodist church. Membership has reached over a thousand and some have even gone back to Myanmar to plant churches there.

=== Christian Reformed Church in Myanmar ===
The Christian Reformed Church in Myanmar was founded in 1985 by Pastor Chan Thleng who was ordained in the Presbyterian Church in Myanmar. He was born into the Matu tribe in Southern Chin State in 1954 and become a Christian in 1974. In 1985 he founded the United Christian Church. After he graduated from Calvin Theological Seminary in Grand Rapids, MI he returned to Burma and changed the denominations name to the Christian Reformed Church. It has 52 congregations and 13 preaching points with more than 6,000 members. The church is divided into 10 Classes. Most of the evangelists work among Buddhist and Animist people.

The Church recognises the Belgic Confession, Heidelberg Catechism, Canons of Dort and the Ecumenical Creeds. The Reformed Theological seminary was established in Yangon in 1997. The college offers a degree of Bachelor of Theology. The Christian Reformed Church also maintains a clinic which was opened in 1999 in Matupi.

The church belonged to the Reformed Ecumenical Council, the only Burmese denomination to do so. When the REC merged with the World Alliance of Reformed Churches, the Christian Reformed Church moved its affiliation to the World Communion of Reformed Churches. The denomination held its 26th General assembly in 17–20 March 2011. It entered into official ecclesiastical fellowship with the Christian Reformed Church in North America in 2011.

=== Presbyterian Churches ===
The largest Presbyterian denomination in the country is the Presbyterian Church in Myanmar. It was formed in 1956 when missionaries arrived from India. In 2023, it has 245 congregations with more than 33,000 members. Other denominations include;

- Evangelical Presbyterian Church in Myanmar
- Reformed Presbyterian Church in Myanmar
- Independent Presbyterian Church in Myanmar

=== Mara Evangelical Church ===
The Mara Evangelical Church is one of the oldest churches in Chin State. It was founded by English missionaries, Rev. Reginald Arthur Lorrain and his wife, in 1907. In 2023, the church had 97 congregations and 19,810 members. It is affiliated with the World Communion of Reformed Churches.

=== True Jesus Church in Myanmar ===
The True Jesus Church is a nontrinitarian Christian denomination begun in China, growing out of the Pentecostal movement. Since its foundation, it has spread to other countries, including Myanmar.

In 2023, the church is present in Yangon, Kalaymyo and Sawbuayeshin. Two full-time local preachers serve 300 believers.

== See also ==
- Christianity in Myanmar
- Roman Catholicism in Myanmar
- Lisu Church
- Myanmar Institute of Theology
- Presbyterian Church in Myanmar
- Reformed Evangelical Church in Myanmar
- Zomi Baptist Convention of Myanmar
- True Jesus Church
- United Reformed Church in Myanmar
