= Christian Reformed Church in Myanmar =

Reformed church of Myanmar

The Christian Reformed Church in Myanmar is a Reformed church of Myanmar, and was founded in 1985 by Pastor Chan Thleng who was formerly ordained in the Presbyterian Church in Myanmar. He belongs to the Matu tribe in Southern Chin State born in 1954, becoming Christian in 1974. In 1985 he founded the United Christian Church after he graduated from Calvin Theological Seminary in Grand Rapids, MI. He returned to Burma and changed the denomination's name to the Christian Reformed Church. It has 52 congregations and 13 preaching points with more than 6,000 members. The church is divided into 10 classes. Most of the evangelists work among Buddhist and Animist people. The Church recognizes the Belgic Confession, Heidelberg Catechism, Canons of Dort and the Ecumenical Creeds. To train pastors the church founded the Reformed Theological seminary in Yangon in 1997. The college offers a degree of Bachelor of Theology. The Christian Reformed Church maintains a clinic opened in 1999 in Matupi. It belonged to the Reformed Ecumenical Council, the only Burmese denomination to do so. But REC merged with the World Alliance of Reformed Churches, now the Christian Reformed Church is affiliated with the World Communion of Reformed Churches. The denomination held its 26th General assembly on March 17–20, 2011. It entered into official ecclesiastical fellowship with the Christian Reformed Church in North America in 2011.

The church is a member of the Reformed and Presbyterian Church Fellowship in Myanmar along with the Evangelical Presbyterian Church in Myanmar, the United Reformed Church in Myanmar, the Reformed Presbyterian Church in Myanmar, the Reformed Community Churches in Myanmar, Reformed Evangelical Church in Myanmar, the Biblical Presbyterian Church in Myanmar and the Reformed Baptist Church in Myanmar.
