= Reformed Evangelical Presbyterian Church of Colombia =

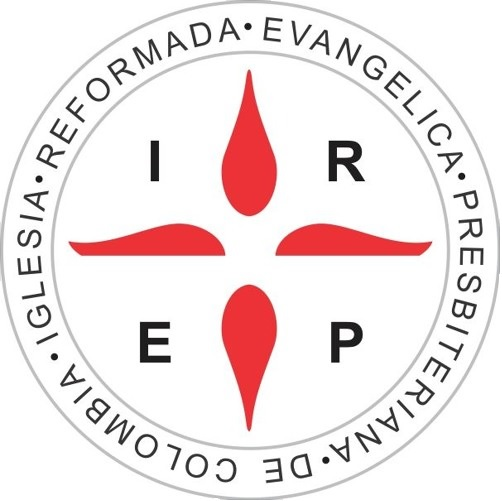
- Classification: Protestant
- Orientation: Reformed Faith
- Theology: Calvinist
- Governance: Presbyterian
- Region: Colombia
- Origin: 1992
- Branched from: Presbyterian Church in America
- Congregations: 14 (2020)
- Official website: www.irepcolombia.org

The Reformed Evangelical Presbyterian Church of Colombia (in Spanish Iglesia Reformada Evangélica Presbiteriana de Colombia or IREPC), also known as Reformed Church of Latin America, is a Protestant Reformed denomination, founded in Colombia in 1992, by missionaries from the Presbyterian Church in America.

== History ==
Presbyterianism arrived in Colombia in 1855, when Reverend Ramón Montsalvatge arrived in the country. His work led to the formation of the Presbyterian Church of Colombia (PCC).

In 1992, missionaries from the Presbyterian Church in America (IPA) began planting churches in Bogotá. Several churches arose from there, which could not affiliate with the Presbyterian Church of Colombia (PCC) due to doctrinal differences between the PCC and the IPA.

Together, these churches decided to form a new denomination, the "Reformed Evangelical Presbyterian Church of Colombia" (IREPC). The first general assembly was held in 2000.

The first Colombian pastors ordained were Rev. Rafael Leal and James Leal, in 2001.

Since then, the denomination has grown to 14 churches in 2 presbyteries.

== Doctrine ==
The denomination subscribes to the Westminster Confession of Faith, Westminster Larger Catechism and Westminster Shorter Catechism.

== Theology ==
- Westminster Confession of Faith - the original form of 1647, adopted by the Presbyterian church in the nineteenth century.
- Westminster Shorter Catechism
- Westminster Larger Catechism

== Inter-Church Relations ==
The denomination was once a member of the World Reformed Fellowship.

In 2010, the IREPC sent a delegate to the Supreme Council of the Presbyterian Church of Brazil.
