= Evangelical Presbyterian Church =

Evangelical Presbyterian Church may refer to:

- Evangelical Presbyterian Church (Australia)
- Evangelical Presbyterian Church in Bolivia
- Evangelical Presbyterian Church in Chile
- Evangelical Presbyterian Church in England and Wales
- Evangelical Presbyterian Church, Ghana
- Evangelical Presbyterian Church (Ireland)
- Evangelical Presbyterian Church of Malawi
- Evangelical Presbyterian Church of Myanmar
- Evangelical Presbyterian Church of Peru
- Evangelical Presbyterian Church in Portugal
- Evangelical Presbyterian Church of Ukraine
- Evangelical Presbyterian Church (United States), established in 1981
- Evangelical Presbyterian Church (established 1956), a denomination that, through a series of mergers, eventually became part of the Presbyterian Church in America
