= Reformed Presbyterian Church of Malawi =

The Reformed Presbyterian Church of Malawi was initiated by mission work of the Free Presbyterian Church of Scotland, and was founded in 1985. There are more than 200 congregations and 7.000 to 10.000 members mainly in rural areas of central and southern Malawi. Since 2006 the Hersteld Hervormde Kerk of the Netherlands Restored Reformed Church supports this denomination.

The congregations are small, some of them find their origin in evangelistic meetings. Rev. R.J. Oomen was the first Restored Reformed Missionary from the Netherlands who at first gave theological training to theological students. Later on his task was training of office bearers in the presbyteries and in the congregations. He has been an adviser of classes and of the synod of the church from 2007 to 2017. For some time Mr. A. van Bragt was assisting the church, building church buildings and organizing deaconal help. Rev. K. Klopstra together with two Malawian lecturers, Rev. N.K. Banda and Dr. J.M. Jumbe, was responsible for the education of theological students from 2011 until 2016.

In 2005 the first Synod meeting was held and the church adopted the Apostles' Creed, the Nicean Creed, the Westminster Confession of Faith, the Westminster Larger Catechism, the Westminster Shorter Catechism and the Heidelberg Catechism. A year later the synod accepted her own church order. The first moderator of the synod was Rev. Ben, followed by Rev. Falamenga. In 2012 Rev. Kuntaja was the moderator of the synod, Rev. Chinaima was the vice moderator and Rev. Kalulu was the general secretary.

In 2020, the church merged with the Associated Reformed Presbyterian Church in Malawi.

== See also ==
- Religion in Malawi
- Christianity in Malawi
