= Church of India =

Church of India may refer to:

== General ==
- Christianity in India
  - Saint Thomas Christians
    - Malabar Church (historic, general)
    - Malankara Church (historic, general)
  - Oriental Orthodoxy in India
  - Catholic Church in India
  - Eastern Orthodoxy in India
  - Protestantism in India

== Eastern churches ==
Church of the East

- India (East Syriac ecclesiastical province) (historical overview)
- Chaldean Syrian Church (Assyrian Church of the East in India)

Oriental Orthodox

- Jacobite Syrian Christian Church (Syriac Orthodox Church of India)
  - Malankara Syriac Knanaya Archdiocese
- Malankara Orthodox Syrian Church (Indian Orthodox Church)

Eastern Catholic

- Syro-Malabar Catholic Church
- Syro-Malankara Catholic Church

Reformed/independent

- Malabar Independent Syrian Church
- Mar Thoma Syrian Church (Malankara Mar Thoma Syrian Church)
- St. Thomas Evangelical Church of India

== Western churches ==
- Anglican Church of India, part of the Continuing Anglican movement
- Church of India, Burma and Ceylon (CIBC)—later "Church of India, Pakistan, Burma and Ceylon" (CIPBC)—the historic province of the Anglican Communion in British India
- Church of North India (United Church, Protestant), and a successor of the CIPBC; previously Church of the Brethren in India
- Church of South India (United Church, Protestant), and a successor of the CIPBC
- Evangelical Church of India, an extension of One Mission Society
- Presbyterian Church of India
- Reformed Presbyterian Church of India
- South India Reformed Churches, also known as Reformed Church of India

== See also ==
- Indian Church (disambiguation)
- Communion of Churches in India
- National Council of Churches in India
- United Evangelical Lutheran Churches in India
