= Presbyterian Reformed Church =

Presbyterian Reformed Church may refer to:

- Presbyterian Reformed Church (Australia)
- Presbyterian Reformed Church in India
- Presbyterian Reformed Church of Ecuador

== See also ==
- Protestant Reformed Churches in America
