= Associated Reformed Presbyterian Church in Malawi =

Associate Reformed Presbyterian Church in Malawi
- Classification: Protestant
- Orientation: Reformed
- Theology: Calvinist
- Polity: Presbyterian
- Region: Malawi
- Origin: 2014
- Merged into: Reformed Presbyterian Church of Malawi
- Congregations: 6 (2020)

The Associated Reformed Presbyterian Church of Malawi also known as Associate Reformed Presbyterian Church of Malawi (ARPCM ) was a denomination Reformed Presbyterian in Malawi, formed in 2014 by John Joseph Matandika.

In 2020, it was incorporated into the Reformed Presbyterian Church of Malawi.

== History ==
In 2007, John Joseph Matandika began working with the "Joy for the World" Mission in Malawi, a mission that promotes Calvinism in the country.

In 2012, the pastor received a degree in Theology from the African Bible College, Uganda.

After returning to Malawi, he founded the Associated Reformed Presbyrerian Church in Malawi in 2014.

In 2020, the name was absorbed by the Reformed Presbyterian Church of Malawi.

== Doctrine ==
The IPRAM subscribes to the Westminster Confession of Faith, Westminster Larger Catechism and Westminster Shorter Catechism.

== Inter-church relations ==
The denomination was once a member of the World Reformed Fellowship
