= Presbyterian Church in India (Reformed) =

- Classification: Protestant
- Orientation: Reformed
- Theology: Calvinist
- Polity: Presbyterian
- Associations: World Reformed Fellowship and Reformed and Presbyterian Fellowship of India
- Region: Manipur
- Origin: 1984
- Separated from: Evangelical Convention Church
- Branched from: Presbyterian Church in America
- Congregations: 50 (2015)
- Members: 10.000 (2015)
- Official website: www.pcireformed.org

Presbyterian Church in India (Reformed) is a presbyterian denomination, established in Manipur in 1984, formed by a group of churches that broke away from the Evangelical Convention Church.

== History ==
On 1908, the Dr. and Mrs. Peter Frazer and Watkin Roberts, sent by the Presbyterian Church of Wales, arrived in India. On 1908, they arrived in Aizawl, Mizoram. They were joined by other missionaries like Rev. and Mrs. David Evan Jones and Rev. and Mrs. Robert Evans. Rev. Dr. Frazer.

From this missionary work the Evangelical Convention Church was organized.

In the 1970s, one of the pastors of this denomination, the Rev. Vung D. Tombing, attended Covenant Theological Seminary at Presbyterian Church in America.

After returning to India in 1977, this pastor had a great influence on the Evangelical Convention Church.

However, the denomination took a stand against Calvinism in 1984.

In the same year, a group of adherent members of the Reformed doctrines withdrew and formed the Presbyterian Church in India (Reformed).

From its growth, the appellation spread to several cities. In 2018 it had about 50 churches and congregations and 10,000 members.

== Doctrine ==
The IPIR adopts the Apostles' Creed, Westminster Confession of Faith, Westminster Shorter Catechism and Westminster Larger Catechism as its official doctrine. The denomination opposes women's ordination.

== Inter-church relations ==
The denomination is a member of the World Reformed Fellowship and the Reformed and Presbyterian Fellowship of India.
