= Evangelical Presbyterian Church of Sikkim =

Council of Evangelical Presbyterian Church of Sikkim
- Classification: Protestant
- Orientation: Reformed
- Theology: Calvinist
- Polity: Presbyterian
- Associations: Reformed and Presbyterian Fellowship of India
- Region: Sikkim
- Origin: 1993; 32 years ago
- Separated from: Church of North India
- Branched from: Church of Scotland
- Congregations: 120 (2015)
- Members: 61,000 (2018)
- Official website: councilofepcs.org

The Evangelical Presbyterian Church of Sikkim (EPCS) is a Presbyterian denomination that was reorganised in Sikkim 1993 by various churches that broke away from the Church of North India. As of 2014, it is the largest Christian denomination in Sikkim.

== History ==
The Presbyterian churches originate from the Protestant Reformation of the 16th century. It is the Christian Protestant churches that adhere to Reformed theology and whose ecclesiastical government is characterized by the government of an assembly of elders.

Government Presbyterian is common in Protestant churches that were modeled after the Reformation Protestant Switzerland, notably in the countries of Switzerland, Scotland, Netherlands, France and portions of Prussia, of Ireland and later in United States.

In the 19th and 20th centuries, the Church of Scotland planted churches in North India. In 1936, the Evangelical Presbyterian Church of Sikkim was established by the Scottish missions. However, after the Independence of India, the missionaries had to leave the region. Consequently, most Protestant groups in the north of the country united to form the Church of North India (CNI) in 1970.

In 1993, most of the CNI-affiliated churches in Sikkim separated from the denomination and reconstituted the Evangelical Presbyterian Church of Sikkim, the largest Christian denomination in the state since then. Since then, the denomination has been known for its social actions.

== Doctrine ==
The EPCS subscribes to the Apostles' Creed, Athanasian Creed, Niceno-Constantinopolitan Creed, Westminster Confession of Faith, Westminster Shorter Catechism and Westminster Larger Catechism.

== Interchurch Relations ==
The denomination is a member of the Reformed and Presbyterian Fellowship of India.
