= Christian Reformed Fellowship of India =

Continental Reformed denomination

Reformed Christian Fellowship of India
- Classification: Protestant
- Orientation: Continental Reformed
- Theology: Calvinist
- Polity: Presbyterian
- Associations: World Reformed Fellowship and Reformed and Presbyterian Fellowship of India
- Region: Madhya Pradesh, Gujarati, Rajasthan and Maharashtra
- Origin: 2006
- Branched from: Christian Reformed Churches of Australia
- Official website: www.gospel.net.au

The Christian Reformed Fellowship of India - CRFI - is a Continental Reformed denomination, established in India, in 2006, by missionary from Christian Reformed Churches of Australia.

== History ==
In 2006, the Christian Reformed Churches of Australia started church planting in the states of Madhya Pradesh, Gujarati, Rajasthan and Maharashtra. These churches organized themselves into a denomination called the Christian Reformed Fellowship of India.

The denomination began to send its candidates for pastoral ministry to the Dehradun Presbyterian Theological Seminary, which is why it started to have contact with other Reformed denominations in the country. Consequently, the denomination joined the Reformed and Presbyterian Fellowship of India.

From the growth of the denomination, in 2019, it was formed by 300 communities (churches and congregations), served by 80 evangelists.

== Interchurch Relations ==
The denomination is a member of World Reformed Fellowship and Reformed and Presbyterian Fellowship of India and receives assistance from Protestant Church in the Netherlands.
