= Evangelical Reformed Church of Colombia =

Protestant Reformed denomination

- Classification: Protestant
- Orientation: Calvinism
- Theology: Calvinist
- Governance: Presbyterian
- Associations: Latin American Fellowship of Reformed Churches
- Region: Colômbia
- Origin: 1987
- Separated from: Presbyterian Church in Colombia (Reformed Synod)
- Branched from: Presbyterian Church of Korea (TongHap)

The Evangelical Reformed Church of Colombia (in Spanish Iglesia Evangélica Reformada de Colombia ir IERC), is a Protestant Reformed denomination, founded in Colombia in 1987 by Kim Wui -Dong, missionary of the Presbyterian Church of Korea (TongHap) and dissident Presbyterian churches of the Presbyterian Church in Colombia (Reformed Synod).

== History ==
In 1987, the Revd. Kim Wui-Dong, a missionary from the Presbyterian Church of Korea (TongHap), came to Colombia and founded, in Bogotá, the Reformed Theological Seminary of Colombia.

At first, the missionary helped the Presbyterian Church in Colombia (Reformed Synod) (IPPCSR). However, differences arose that led to the end of the cooperation. Some IPCSR churches supported the missionary and left the denomination. Together, the churches founded a new denomination called Evangelical Reformed Church of Colombia.

Later, missionary Seok-Hoon Koh was also sent to the Presbyterian Church of Korea (TongHap) to help with missionary work in the country.

== Inter-Church Relations ==
A denomination and member of the Latin American Fellowship of Reformed Churches
