= Presbyterian Reformed Church of Ecuador =

National Presbyterian Church

Reformed Presbyterian Church of Ecuador
- Classification: Protestant
- Orientation: Reformed Faith
- Theology: Calvinist
- Governance: Presbyterian
- Region: Ecuador
- Origin: 1991
- Branched from: Presbyterian Church in America
- Congregations: 3 (2018)

The Reformed Presbyterian Church of Ecuador (Spanish: Iglesia Reformada Presbiteriana del Ecuador; RPCE) is a Protestant Reformed, founded in Ecuador in 1991, by missionaries of the Presbyterian Church in America.

== History ==
In 1991, missionaries from the Presbyterian Church in America began planting churches in Quito. From this, several churches emerged, which together constituted the Presbyterian Church of Ecuador (IRPE) in 1995.

However, in 2019, the denomination consisted of 3 churches in Quito and 1 congregation in the Amazon region, after some churches split.

== Doctrine ==
The denomination subscribes to Westminster Confession of Faith, Westminster Larger Catechism and Westminster Shorter Catechism.
