= Presbyterian Church in the Gambia =

Protestant denomination in the Gambia

- Classification: Protestant
- Orientation: Reformed
- Theology: Calvinist
- Polity: Presbyterian
- Moderator: Edrissa Colley
- Region: The Gambia
- Founder: Abou Camara
- Origin: 2010; The Gambia
- Branched from: Presbyterian Church in America and Presbyterian Church of Senegal
- Congregations: 5

The Presbyterian Church in the Gambia is a Reformed Presbyterian Christian denomination in The Gambia. Its origins are connected to local missionary efforts begun in the early 2010s through indigenous Gambian pastors

== History ==
In 2010, Abou Camara started church planting work, with the purpose of spreading the Gospel in the interior and villages of the Gambia and training local Christian leaders started with the help of pastors from the Presbyterian church in America.

In 2015, the Presbyterian Church in the Gambia was organized, reconstituted, had a book of church order. four pastors were ordained in 2015 as the first reformed pastors in the country.

The church planting work of the PCG was supported by international Reformed missionary efforts, including the West Africa Reformed Mission (WARM) and Mission to World (MTW), the missions agency of the Presbyterian Church in America. It also received cooperation and support from the Presbyterian Church of Senegal.

In 2015, Pastor Mamadou Diop, founder of the Presbyterian Church of Senegal, together with pastors connected to the Presbyterian Church in America, ordained the first national pastors of the Presbyterian Church in the Gambia. By that year, the denomination reportedly had about 9 churches across the country.

The first moderator was Abou Camara who resigned and left the church in 2018. since then, Edrissa Colley has been serving as moderator of the denomination.

== Social work ==
The Presbyterian Church in the Gambia has participated in social initiatives including the distribution of medicine and other forms of assistance, seeking to combine evangelism with pastoral care and community support.

== Inter-church relations ==
The denomination maintains relations with other Reformed and Presbyterian bodies in West Africa and internationally. It has received support from the Presbyterian Church in America and has cooperated with the Presbyterian Church of Senegal. It has also been connected to Presbyterian work in Sierra Leone.

The denomination has also been linked to local Reformed initiatives in the Gambia, including the Reformed Presbyterian Church in the Gambia.
