= Aashish Presbyterian Free Church in Nepal =

Christian denomination in Nepal

Aashish Free Presbyterian Church of Nepal
- Classification: Protestant
- Orientation: Reformed
- Theology: Calvinist
- Polity: Presbyterian
- Region: Nepal
- Origin: 1989
- Branched from: Free Presbyterian Church of Kalimpong
- Congregations: 31 (2016)

The Aashish Free Presbyterian Church of Nepal (AFPCN), also known simply as Aashish Presbyterian Church (APC), is a Reformed Presbyterian denomination in Nepal. It was formed in 1989 by missionaries from the Free Presbyterian Church of Kalimpong.

== History ==
In 1989, the Free Presbyterian Church of Kalimpong sent missionary Pandi Bhattarai to Nepal.

As the number of members grew, more churches were established in the country.

Later, the Evangelical Brotherhood of the Himalayas helped to plant new churches in the country.

As of 2013, the denomination began to receive help from missionaries from Igreja Presbiteriana do Brasil.

And in 2016, it was already formed by 31 churches and congregations.

== Inter-Church Relations ==
The APC was previously a member of the World Reformed Fellowship.

In addition, the denomination has relations with the Presbyterian Church of Brazil.
