= Nepali Reformed Churches =

Christian denomination in Nepal

- Classification: Protestant
- Orientation: Calvinist
- Theology: Reformed
- Polity: Presbyterian
- Region: Nepal
- Founder: Arbin Pokharel
- Origin: 2005
- Branched from: Christian Reformed Church of North America
- Congregations: 30 (2020)

The Nepali Reformed Churches (NRC) form a Continental Reformed denomination in Nepal. It was founded in 2005 by Rev. Arbin Pokharel, a native Nepalese convert to Christianity who returned to the country as a missionary. In 2020, the denomination already consisted of 32 churches.

== History ==
Arbin Pokharel was born in Nepal, and at the age of 4, he went to live in a Christian orphanage. He later received an offer of study in the United States, where he was baptized and became a member of Christian Reformed Church of North America.

In 2004, Rev. Arbin Pokhrel decided to return to Nepal to begin planting Reformed churches in the country.

In 2005, the missionary founded a church in Kathmandu. Later, as the number of members grew, other churches were started in other parts of the country. Together these churches organized the Nepali Reformed Churches (NRC). In 2020, the denomination already reached 32 churches.

== Interchurch Relations ==
The NRC were formerly members of the World Reformed Fellowship.
