= Evangelical Reformed Church of India =

- Classification: Protestant
- Orientation: Continental Reformed
- Theology: Calvinist
- Polity: Presbyterian
- Associations: Reformed and Presbyterian Fellowship of India, World Reformed Fellowship and International Conference of Reformed Churches
- Region: India
- Origin: 2003
- Branched from: United Reformed Churches in North America
- Congregations: 84 (2022)
- Official website: www.mpmindia.org

The Evangelical Reformed Church of India, also called Evangelical Reformed Church in India (ERCI) is a denomination Continental Reformed in India, founded in 2003, through the NGO Mission of Peace Making.

== History ==
In 2003, the NGO Mission of Peace Making began evangelism and church planting work in Himachal Pradesh, Punjab, northern Chandigarh and eastern Orissa, with the help of local churches of the United Reformed Churches in North America and other Continental Reformed churches of the United States . Consequently, churches have been planted in several cities.

For the training of new members and future leaders, the Reformed Theological Institute was created, directed by Rev. Anup Hiwale.

From the expansion of the work, 84 churches were organized.

== Inter-church Relations ==
The church has relationships with the United Reformed Churches in North America.

In addition, he is a member of the Reformed and Presbyterian Fellowship of India, World Reformed Fellowship and the International Conference of Reformed Churches (since 2022).
