= Presbyterian Church in Myanmar =

- Classification: Protestant
- Orientation: Reformed (Conservative)
- Theology: Reformed, Evangelical
- Governance: Presbyterian
- Associations: World Communion of Reformed Churches
- Region: Myanmar
- Origin: 1956
- Branched from: Mizo Presbyterian Church
- Congregations: 245 (2023)
- Members: 33,000+ (2023)

The Presbyterian Church in Myanmar (PCM) is a conservative Reformed denomination in Myanmar, founded by Mizo immigrants in the mid-1950s.

== History ==
The migration of the Mizo people from Mizoram in northeast India to Myanmar from 1914 to 1950 contributed to spreading Presbyterianism within the country. Some of these migrants became Presbyterians during the revival in their region in the 1930s organized by Welsh Presbyterian missionaries. The Presbyterian congregations in Myanmar were under the care of Mizo Presbyterian Church in India for several years until the founding of the Presbyterian Church of Myanmar.

The Presbyterian Church of Myanmar was officially established at Losau in 1956 by Mizo immigrants after they moved to the Kalay and Kabaw Valley in upper Chindwin. They were served first by a Baptist, then by a Methodist minister. The Mizo Presbyterians maintained the Reformed faith. The church spread in the surrounding regions. In 1962 the church was constituted at the national level with 5,000 members. The church extended its activities to the southern Chin Hills, Rakhine State, upper Sagaing Division. The denomination is a member of the World Communion of Reformed Churches and by 2013 had about 30,000 members in 256 parishes and 160 house fellowships. A partner church relationship with the Presbyterian Church (USA) and Presbyterian Church Ireland have also been established.

== Denominations and the Split ==
In 2023, the denomination has 245 congregations with more than 33,000 members. Congregations are spread over a large area of Myanmar, often in remote mountainous regions. Over time some members saw the church, in their eyes, succumb to liberalism, modernism, and ecumenical and charismatic movements. The church started to split into smaller denominations, including the Evangelical Presbyterian Church, Independent Presbyterian Church and Reformed Presbyterian Church.

The Evangelical Presbyterians emerged in 1983 and was founded by Rev. Robert Thawm Luai in Chin State. From the Evangelical Presbyterian followed the Protestant Reformed Church in Myanmar which holds a conservative approach on Christian texts and tradition.

== Missions and Doctrines ==
Like many other Churches in Myanmar, the missions of PCM are focusing on evangelism and social work (including providing food to people from socially disadvantage groups and building hospitals and wells in rural areas). They also focus on church education and empowerment of youth and women. The PCM plays a crucial role in responding to natural disasters by donating to those who are affected.

The PCM and the Methodist Church Upper Myanmar still hold to and stand on the same doctrine to which they have adhered from the beginning. The current leaders desperately need to seek a fresh way of leading the church into a new form of structure and leadership model. The church looks to embrace characteristics of a biblical church first and cultivate it to the larger community outside the church. PCM's theology typically emphasizes the sovereignty of God, the authority of the Scriptures, and the necessity of grace through faith in Christ.

== Liturgy ==
Until the late 20th century, almost all Methodist and Presbyterian churches used the Mizo language (the Baptist churches being an exception to this). All Mizo-Falam-speaking people share a common culture in various aspects. The worship styles takes place in various forms including Sunday gathering in a church as well as house gatherings where a smaller cell group of the people meets and pray together. The PCM’s sees the Church as a place of worship or a gathering place rather an 'institution'. Bible study is also an important aspect of Presbyterian liturgy.

== See also ==
- Christianity in Myanmar
- Protestantism in Myanmar
