= Presbyterian Church of Sierra Leone =

Reformed Presbyterian denomination

- Classification: Protestant
- Orientation: Reformed
- Theology: Calvinist
- Polity: Presbyterian
- Region: Sierra Leone
- Origin: 1988
- Branched from: Kosin Presbyterian Church in Korea
- Congregations: 7 (2021)
- Members: 500 (2021)

The Presbyterian Church of Sierra Leone (PCSL) is a Reformed Presbyterian denomination in Sierra Leone. It was formed in 1988 by Korean missionaries, sent by Kosin Presbyterian Church in Korea.

== History ==
The Presbyterian churches originate from the Protestant Reformation of the 16th century. It is the Christian churches Protestant that adhere to Reformed theology and whose ecclesiastical government is characterized by the government of an assembly of elders. Government Presbyterian is common in Protestant churches that were modeled after the Reformation Protestant Switzerland, notably in Switzerland, Scotland, Netherlands, France and portions of Prussia, of Ireland and later in the United States.

In 1988, the Kosin Presbyterian Church in Korea Mission sent the first missionary family, Rev. and Mrs. Dae Won Shin, to Sierra Leone. The couple worked with the evangelization of children and missionary work grew in the country. Several churches were planted and the denomination was organized.

However, with the outbreak of Sierra Leone Civil War and later Western African Ebola virus epidemic, Korean missionaries had to leave the country. Likewise, most of the denomination's pastors also left the country.

From the beginning, the Presbyterian Church of Ghana supported the PCSL, due to the lack of pastors ordained by the denomination.

In 2021, the denomination consisted of 7 churches and about 500 members.

== Interchurch relations ==
The denomination was previously a member of the World Reformed Fellowship.

As of 2021, the denomination has received assistance from the Presbyterian Church in America for the training of pastors.
