= Presbyterian Church of Colombia (Presbyterian Synod) =

- Classification: Protestant
- Orientation: Reformed Faith
- Theology: Calvinist
- Governance: Presbyterian
- Associations: World Council of Churches, World Communion of Reformed Churches and Alliance of Presbyterian and Reformed Churches of Latin America
- Region: Colombia
- Origin: 1855
- Branched from: Presbyterian Church in the United States of America and Presbyterian Church in the United States
- Separations: 1993: Presbyterian Church of Colombia (Reformed Synod)
- Congregations: 45
- Members: 12,000
- Ministers: 47
- Official website: www.ipcol.org

The Presbyterian Church of Colombia (in Spanish Iglesia Presbiteriana de Colombia or IPCol) - is a Protestant Reformed denomination, founded on the Colombia in 1855, from the missionary work of Rev. Ramón Montsalvatge, sent by the American Bible Society and Rev. Henry Barrington Pratt, sent by Presbyterian Church in the United States of America.

The denomination is known for its activism in defense of human rights in Colombia.

== History ==
In 1855, Rev. Ramón Montsalvatge (sent by the American Bible Society), arrived in Colombia. Subsequently, Rev. Henry Barrington Pratt (sent by Presbyterian Church in the United States of America) also settled in the country. Both missionaries began to serve the foreigners present and originally the services were held in English.

In 1859, the services began to be celebrated in Spanish. However, the denomination grew slowly and faced religious persecution. It was only in 1959 that IPCol acquired complete autonomy from the American denominations.

In 1982, the denomination created the Presbyterian Seminary of Greater Colombia to train its pastors.

And in 1993 IPCol suffered a split. Some of the members separated and formed the Presbyterian Church of Colombia (Reformed Synod).

== Doctrine ==
The denomination ordained women as pastors, elders and deaconesses.

== Inter-church relations ==
The denomination is a member of World Council of Churches, World Communion of Reformed Churches and Alliance of Presbyterian and Reformed Churches of Latin America.
