= Independent Presbyterian Church of Myanmar =

The Independent Presbyterian Church of Myanmar is a Christian Reformed denomination in Myanmar that adheres to the Apostles Creed, Nicene Creed and the Westminster Confession. It was founded in 1938. The Independent Presbyterian Church had approximately 5,000 members and 182 congregations. There is no ordination of women.

The denomination is a member of the World Communion of Reformed Churches.

It is also a member of the Myanmar Council of Churches.

== See also ==
- Christianity in Myanmar
- Protestantism in Myanmar
- Presbyterian Church in Myanmar
