= Indian Church =

Indian Church may refer to:

- Indian Church, Belize, a village in Orange Walk District, Belize
- Old Indian Meeting House, an historic church and meeting house in Mashpee, Massachusetts
- The Indian Church (painting), a 1929 painting by Emily Carr

== See also ==
- Christianity in India
- Church of India (disambiguation)
