= Peace Church Bangladesh =

Presbyterian denomination in Bangladesh

Peace Church Bangladesh or Peace Presbyterian Church in Bangladesh is a Presbyterian denomination in the country. The denomination was founded in 2009. Currently it has a 13-cell church and two preaching fields. One field is in Muslim community, the other is in Hindu community. It acknowledge the Apostles Creed and the Westminster Confession. Peace Church is a member of the World Reformed Fellowship.
