= Presbyterian Reformed Church in India =

- Classification: Protestant
- Orientation: Reformed
- Theology: Calvinist
- Polity: Presbyterian
- Associations: World Reformed Fellowship
- Region: South India
- Origin: 2015
- Branched from: Presbyterian Church of Brazil and Presbyterian Church of Australia
- Congregations: 10 (2022)
- Ministers: 9 (2022)
- Official website: www.prci.in

The Presbyterian Reformed Church in India (PRCI) is a Presbyterian denomination, established in South India, in 2015, as a result of the missionary work of the Presbyterian Church of Brazil (later assisted by the Presbyterian Church of Australia) in Goa, Maharashtra and Chhattisgarh.

== History ==
The Presbyterian churches originate from the Protestant Reformation of the 16th century. It is the Christian churches Protestant that adhere to Reformed theology and whose form of ecclesiastical organization is characterized by the government of an assembly of elders. Government Presbyterian is common in Protestant churches that were modeled after the Reformation Protestant Switzerland, notably in Switzerland, Scotland, Netherlands, France and portions of Prussia, of Ireland and later in United States.

In 2015, Presbyterian Church of Brazil (later assisted by the Presbyterian Church of Australia) start church planting work in Goa, Maharashtra and Chhattisgarh. As a result, 10 churches were organized. These churches together have formed the Presbyterian Reformed Church In India ever since.

Later, the denomination formed a seminary to train Indian leaders.

== Doctrine ==
The PRIC subscribes to the Apostles' Creed, Athanasian Creed, Nicene-Constantinopolitan Creed, Westminster Confession of Faith, Westminster Shorter Catechism, Westminster Larger Catechism and the Three Forms of Unity (Belgic Confession, Heidelberg Catechism and Canons of Dort).

== Interchurch Relations ==
The denomination is a member of the World Reformed Fellowship.

== See also ==
- Reformed Presbyterian Church of India
- Reformed Presbyterian Church North East India
