= Bangladesh Presbyterian Church =

- Classification: Protestant
- Orientation: Evangelical Reformed
- Theology: Calvinist
- Polity: Presbyterian
- Associations: World Reformed Fellowship
- Region: Bangladesh
- Origin: 2015
- Branched from: Presbyterian Church in Korea (TongHap)
- Congregations: 13 (2017)
- Ministers: 20 (2017)

The Bangladesh Presbyterian Church (BPC) is a conservative Reformed denomination Evangelical in Bangladesh. It was organized in 2015, in Dhaka, by Rev. Kyung-Yub Lee, missionary sent to the country by Presbyterian Church in Korea (TongHap).

== History ==
The Presbyterian churches originate from the Protestant Reformation of the 16th century. It is the Christian Protestant churches that adhere to Reformed theology and whose Elastic government is characterized by the government of an assembly of elders. Government Presbyterian is common in Protestant churches that were modeled after the Reformation Protestant Switzerland, notably in Switzerland, Scotland, the Netherlands, France and portions of Prussia, of Ireland and later in the United States.

On 3 January 1993, the Presbyterian Church in Korea (TongHap) sent missionaries Kyung-Yub Lee and Eunok Song to Dhaka, Bangladesh, for the purpose of planting churches and develop social works.

In 1994, Rev. Moldol also visited the country. Other missionaries sent to the country later include: Kim Yong-Taek, Lee Kyung-Hee, Park Ji-Hoon, Kim Hyun-jung, Myung-Hee Eom, Seok-Ro Lee, Jin-Young Kim, Lee Cheol-Soo, Lee Goo, Jang Man-Young, Jeon Yuk-Yeop, Doo-Seok Hong, Chan-Kyung Park, Jeong Geum-Seok, and Yang Kyung-Hee.

Missionaries built schools and charities, and many Bangladeshis converted to Presbyterianism. Subsequently, the denomination began training national converts to lead the church itself. Since then, the ordinations of Bangladeshi pastors have begun.

From the growth of the missionary work, the new denomination was formally constituted in 2015, with the name Bangladesh Presbyterian Church.

As of 2017, the denomination had 13 churches, 20 pastors, and ran 19 schools, with approximately 1,800 students.

== Inter-ecclesiastical relations ==
The BPC is a member of World Reformed Fellowship, a worldwide organization that brings together conservative Reformed churches.
