= World Reformed Fellowship =

Ecumenical Christian organization

- Type: Fellowship
- Classification: Protestant
- Orientation: Confessionally Reformed
- Origin: 2000; 26 years ago
- Members: 6,886,074
- Official website: www.wrf.global

The World Reformed Fellowship (WRF) is an ecumenical, Protestant Christian fellowship that advances partnerships among confessional Reformed churches around the world.

== History ==
The World Fellowship of Reformed Churches was formed in 1994 by the Presbyterian Church in America, the National Presbyterian Church in Mexico, and the Presbyterian Church of Brazil, as well as member churches mainly from Latin American countries and from India, East Africa and the United States. The International Reformed Fellowship (IRF) was formed also in 1994 with Calvinist churches in Indonesia, Taiwan, Japan, and from all part of Asia.

The World Fellowship of Reformed Churches and the International Reformed Fellowship united on October 24, 2000 to form the World Reformed Fellowship. The WRF is now an international body represented in seventy-nine countries.

== Work ==
The WRF operates commissions that serve its global membership, focusing on evangelism and missions, theological education, and theology. These commissions facilitate dialogue for better partnership between member denominations and organizations, produce and provide resources for the church, operate as theological and ministerial forums between WRF members, and serve as platforms of engagement from the WRF towards other organizations. The theological commission has produced several documents, such as the WRF’s Statement of Faith, a narrative statement on Reformed identity, and a statement on ecclesiology, all designed to facilitate greater theological partnership across cultural and intra-Reformed theological differences. The commissions of the WRF sometimes facilitate larger forums, such as partnering with the Lausanne Movement to host a consultation on theological education in 2014 in São Paulo and a theological consultation on Christian ministry among Muslims in 2011 in Istanbul. The WRF partners with both the World Evangelical Alliance, of which the WRF is an affiliate member, and New Growth Press for book publishing.

The WRF hosts a global general assembly approximately every four years. These assemblies review and direct the work of the WRF’s commissions, are a time of networking and fellowship for the membership of the WRF, and are where the WRF’s membership hears about major issues facing the global church in order to consider and address them.

- 2000 Orlando, United States
- 2006 Johannesburg, South Africa
- 2010 Edinburgh, Scotland
- 2015 São Paulo, Brazil
- 2019 Jakarta, Indonesia
- 2022 Orlando, United States
- 2026 Seoul, South Korea

WRF membership is also divided up into regional boards for planning and implementing fellowship for ministries within their own larger, geographic area. These boards are more contextualized than the general assembly, both in composition and in the nature of their work.

=== Governance ===
Governance of the WRF is held by its membership voting at general assemblies. Oversight and operations are carried out by a board of directors and an international director (CEO).

Chairmen of the Board,

- 2000–2016: Rick Perrin, Presbyterian Church in America
- 2016–2017: Solano Portela Neto, Presbyterian Church of Brazil
- 2017–present: Robert M. Norris, Evangelical Presbyterian Church

International Directors,

- 2000–2005: Paul Gilchrist, Presbyterian Church in America
- 2005–2015: Samuel T. Logan, Orthodox Presbyterian Church
- 2015–2017: Flip Buys, Reformed Churches in South Africa
- 2017–present: Davi Charles Gomes, Presbyterian Church of Brazil

== Membership ==
The WRF is similar in theology to the International Conference of Reformed Churches and more conservative than the World Communion of Reformed Churches, though several member churches of the WRF are also members of either the ICRC or the WCRC. The WRF primarily differs from these other groups in that it is a fellowship, not a council, and so includes in its membership not only denominations, but individual congregations, pastors and theologians, and non-ecclesial organizations (e.g. theological seminaries). It conceives of its existence as facilitating dialogue and sharing of resources between the different global branches of Reformed Christians. Unlike the WCRC, which officially supports the ordination of women, and the ICRC, which prohibits denominational members that ordain women as pastors, the WRF as a confessional fellowship recognizes the diversity of positions among its members regarding the ordination women. There are a total of 86 denominational members of the WRF and 155 organizational members, as of February, 2026. The majority (79 of 86, as of February, 2026) of WRF member denominations prohibit women from being ordained as pastors, elders, or deacons.

The WRF has a Reformed, confessional basis for membership. Members have to agree with:

- The statement that "The Scriptures of the Old and New Testament are without error in all that they teach."
- At least one of the following historic Reformed Confessions – The Gallican Confession, The Belgic Confession, The Heidelberg Catechism, The Thirty-Nine Articles, The Second Helvetic Confession, The Canons of Dort, The Westminster Confession of Faith, the London Confession of 1689, the Savoy Declaration, or the WRF Statement of Faith.

The largest churches as of 2025 are (membership of 100,000 or more):

1. National Presbyterian Church in Mexico (2,800,000)
2. Presbyterian Church in Korea (HapDong) (2,242,844)
3. Presbyterian Church of Brazil (702,949)
4. Presbyterian Church in America (405,634)
5. Christian Reformed Church in North America (171,380)
6. ECO: A Covenant Order of Evangelical Presbyterians (127,000)
7. Evangelical Presbyterian Church (119,931)

== Denominational members ==
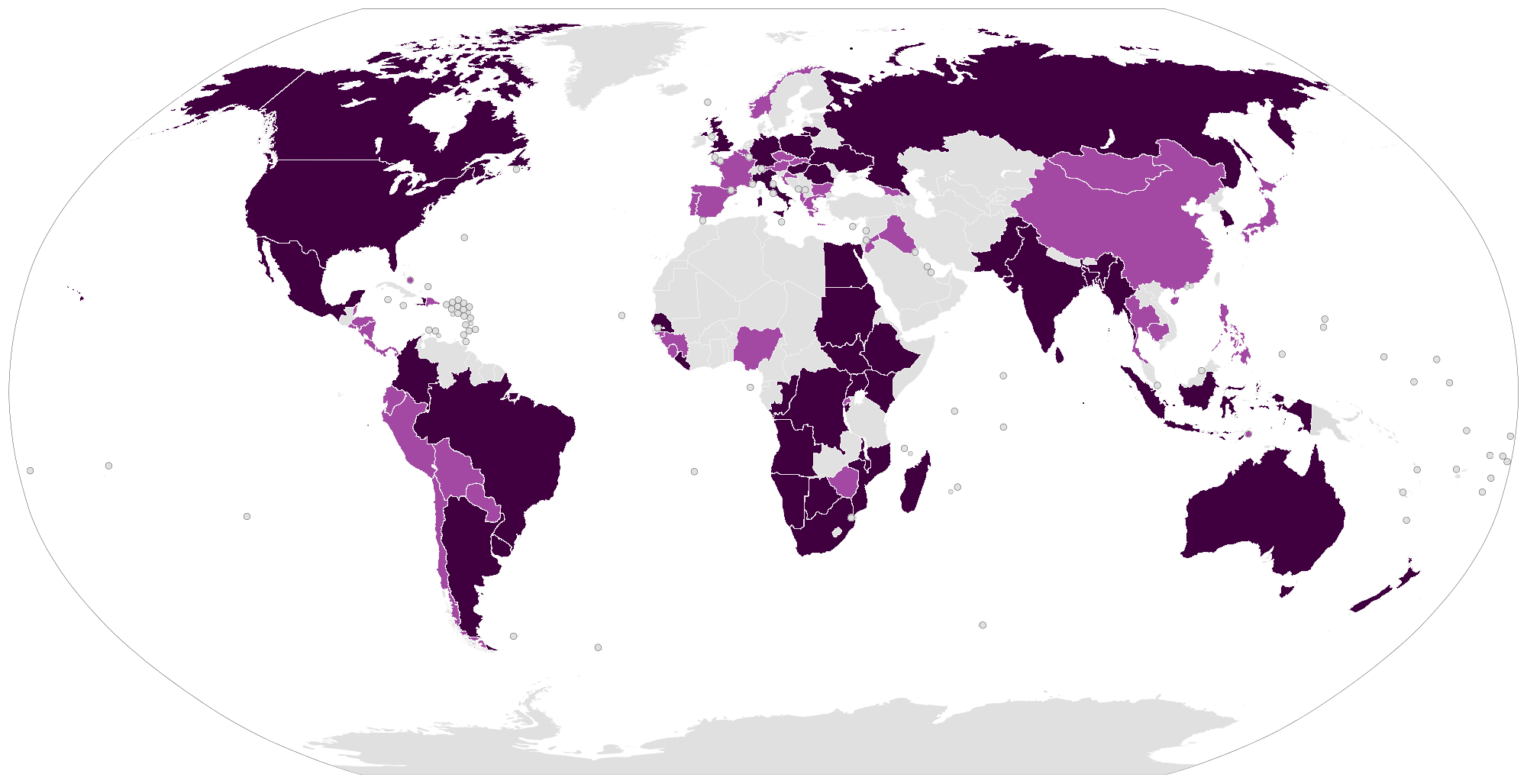
Countries with member denominations of the World Reformed Fellowship Countries with missions of member denominations of the World Reformed Fellowship

As of February 2026, there are 86 member denominations: (Note: The website's membership list lists members of the Presbyterian Church in India (Reformed) in duplicate. The second time with the name Anurag Khushal.)

Country	denominational subfamily	Denomination	Number of congregations	Number of members	Year
South Africa	Continental reformed	Christian Reformed Church in South Africa	19	2,500	1984
South Africa	Continental reformed	Reformed Churches in South Africa	382	76,812	2022
Angola	Presbyterian	Presbyterian Church of Angola	100	60,000	2023
Argentina	Reformed anglican	Orthodox Episcopal Anglican Church (Buenos Aires)	-	-	-
Argentina	Presbyterian	Presbyterian Community the Redeemer (Argentina) (Note: Formerly called Argentine National Presbyterian Church (Santa Fe) and ECO (Argentina).)	-	-	-
Australia	Presbyterian	Presbyterian Church of Australia	523	26,137	2023
Australia	Presbyterian	Westminster Presbyterian Church of Australia	16	900	2004
Australia	Presbyterian	Presbyterian Church of Eastern Australia	16	719	2016
Bangladesh	Presbyterian	Presbyterian Church of Bangladesh	26	-	2011
Bangladesh	Presbyterian	Bangladesh Presbyterian Church	13	-	2017
Bangladesh	Presbyterian	Grace Presbyterian Church of Bangladesh	-	-	-
Bangladesh	Presbyterian	Isa-e Church	125	6,000	2015
Bangladesh	Continental reformed	Evangelical Reformed Church of Bangladesh	-	-	-
Bangladesh	Continental reformed	Bangladesh Evangelical Reformed Church of Bandarban, Tripura	-	-	-
Bangladesh	Reformed baptist	Smyrna House of Prayer Church	-	-	-
Bangladesh	Reformed baptist	Thyatira Church Trust Bangladesh	-	-	-
Brazil	Presbyterian	Presbyterian Church of Brazil	5,420	702,947	2021
Brazil	-	Christian Church Nations For Christ	-	-	-
Burundi	Continental reformed	Christian Reformed Church in Burundi	-	-	-
Burundi	-	Holy Spirit Revival Church	-	-	-
Canada	Continental reformed	Reformed Church of Quebec	5	265	2024
Colombia	Presbyterian	United Church of Christ in Colombia	-	-	-
Congo	Presbyterian	United Presbyterian Churches of Congo	-	-	-
Democratic Republic of the Congo	Presbyterian	Kivu Presbyterian Church	-	-	-
Democratic Republic of the Congo	Continental reformed	Reformed Community of Katanga	-	-	-
Egypt	-	Gospel Peace Church of Egypt	-	-	-
Ethiopia	Reformed baptist	Raisin Power Baptist Church of Ethiopia	-	-	-
Germany	Reformed baptist	Reformed Free Church in Germany	2	-	2024
Haiti	-	Union of Churches of the Christian Community of Haiti	-	-	-
India	Reformed anglican	Council of Reformed Churches of India	-	-	-
India	Reformed baptist	Telugu Baptist Church Council	-	-	-
India	Reformed anglican	Celitic Cross Ministry Dioceses of India	-	-	-
India	Continental reformed	Christian Reformed Fellowship of India	300	-	2019
India	Reformed anglican	Malankara Evangelical Church	3	-	2024
India	Continental reformed	Reformed Church of India	-	-	-
India	Presbyterian	Presbyterian Reformed Church in India	10	-	(2022)
India	Reformed anglican	India Christian Mission Church	-	-	-
India	Reformed anglican	Christian Mission Church International	-	-	-
India	Presbyterian	Presbyterian Church in India (Reformed)	50	10,000	2015
India	Presbyterian	Reformed Presbyterian Church of India	10	3,000	2004
India	Presbyterian	Presbyterian Free Church of Central India	18	756	2021
India	Presbyterian	India Reformed Presbyterian Church	-	-	-
India	Presbyterian	Reformed Presbyterian Church North East India	105	11,376	2021
India	Continental reformed	Evangelical Reformed Church of India	84	4,627	2022
India	Reformed anglican	United Church of India	-	-	-
India	Reformed anglican	Episcopal Diocese International	-	-	-
Indonesia	Continental reformed	Indonesian Reformed Evangelical Church	74	7,000	2011
Italy	Reformed baptist	Evangelical Reformed Baptist Churches in Italy	14	500	2020
Kenya	Presbyterian	Africa Evangelical Presbyterian Church	100	10,000	2022
Liberia	-	Emmanuel Temple (Sinkor, Monrovia)	-	-	-
Lithuania	Continental reformed	Evangelical Reformed Church of Lithuania	14	7,000	2008
Madagascar	Continental reformed	Protestant Church of Ambohimalaza-Firaisiana	-	-	-
Malawi	Presbyterian	Evangelical Presbyterian Church of Malawi and Mozambique	90	15,000	2016
Mexico	Presbyterian	National Presbyterian Church in Mexico	6,000	2,800,000	2010
Myanmar	Continental reformed	Biblical Reformed Church in Myanmar	-	-	-
Myanmar	Continental reformed	Christian Reformed Church in Myanmar	50	5,000	2004
Myanmar	Continental reformed	Reformed Community Churches in Myanmar	-	-	-
Myanmar	Continental reformed	Reformed Evangelical Church of Myanmar	40	7,000	2010
Myanmar	Presbiteryan	Reformed Presbyterian Church in Myanmar	35	2,500	2021
New Zealand	Presbyterian	Grace Presbyterian Church of New Zealand	25	-	-
Poland	Presbyterian	Evangelical Presbyterian Church in Poland	4	120	2024
Romania, Ukraine and Hungary	Presbyterian	Reformed Presbyterian Church of Central and Eastern Europe	25	370	2022
Russia	Continental reformed	Evangelical Reformed Church of Russia	15	350	2010
Senegal	Presbyterian	Presbyterian Church of Senegal	20	800	2017
South Korea	Presbyterian	Presbyterian Church in Korea (HapDong)	11,788	2,242,844	2024
Sri Lanka	Continental reformed	Christian Reformed Church in Sri Lanka	41	3,000	2014
Sudan and South Sudan	Continental reformed	Sudanese Reformed Churches	34	6,000	2023
Uganda	Presbyterian	Presbyterian Church in Uganda	87	3,045	2019
Uganda	Presbyterian	Reformed Presbyterian Church in Uganda	12	5,000	2004
Uganda	Presbyterians	New Life Presbyterian Church	2	1,000	2004
Uganda	Presbyterian	Community Worship Presbyterian Church	-	-	-
Uganda	Continental reformed	Covenant Reformed Church in Uganda	-	-	-
Uganda	-	Greater Grace Ministry (Kampala, Uganda)	-	-	-
Uganda	-	King's Church (Kampala, Uganda)	-	-	-
Uganda	Presbyterian	Reformed Presbyterian Church in Africa (Uganda)	8	619	2022
United Kingdom	Presbyterian	Associated Presbyterian Churches	9	200	2021
United Kingdom	Presbyterian	Free Church of Scotland	126	11,700	2024
United States	Presbyterian	Presbyterian Church in America	1,959	405,634	2025
United States	Presbyterian	Associated Reformed Presbyterian Church	260	25,692	2022
United States	Presbyterian	Evangelical Presbyterian Church (United States)	626	119,931	2024
United States	Continental reformed	Evangelical Reformed Church in America	-	-	-
United States	Presbyterian	ECO: A Covenant Order of Evangelical Presbyterians	400	127,000	2022
United States	Continental reformed	Christian Reformed Church in North America	929	171,380	2026
United States	Reformed anglican	United Episcopal Church of North America	26	-	-
United States	Reformed anglican	Evangelical and Reformed Synod	8	-	2026
Uruguay	Presbyterian	Presbyterian Church of Uruguay	2	150	2023
World	Total	World Reformed Fellowship	30,074	6,886,074	2004-2025

=== Member Profile ===
1. Presbyterians (95.6%)
2. Continental Reformed (4.41%)
3. Reformed baptist, reformed anglican and others (0.01%)

The vast majority of the World Reformed Fraternity (more than 95.58% of individual members) are Presbyterian denominations. The Continental Reformed Churches represent the second largest group within the FRM, with 4.41% of members. The remaining 0.01% of members are Reformed Anglicans, Reformed Baptists and other denominations.

== Former members ==
Former members of the WRF are:

- South Africa
  - Reformed Evangelical Anglican Church of South Africa
  - Dutch Reformed Church in South Africa (NHK)
- Bangladesh
  - Peace Church Bangladesh
- Benin
  - Church of the Revival of Nations
- Bolivia
  - Presbyterian Church in Bolivia
- Burundi
  - Reformed Protestant Church of Burundi
- Colombia
  - Reformed Evangelical Presbyterian Church of Colombia
- Democratic Republic of Congo
  - Evangelical Reformed Church in the Democratic Republic of Congo
  - Presbyterian Church in the Eastern Democratic Republic of Congo
- Croatia
  - Protestant Reformed Christian Church in Croatia
- India
  - Presbyterian Church of India
  - Presbyterian Church of South India
- Ivory Coast
  - Evangelical Presbyterian Church of Ivory Coast
  - Voile Déchiré Mission, Abidjan, Ivory Coast
- Malawi
  - Associated Reformed Presbyterian Church in Malawi
- Myanmar
  - Evangelical Presbyterian Church of Myanmar
  - United Reformed Church in Myanmar
- Nepal
  - Nepali Reformed Churches
  - Aashish Presbyterian Free Church in Nepal
  - Reformed Church of Nepal
- Nigeria
  - God's Healing Ministry Lagos, Nigeria
- Pakistan
  - United Presbyterian Church of Pakistan
  - Sutlej Reformed Church of Pakistan
- Peru
  - Evangelical Presbyterian Church of Peru
- Philippines
  - General Assembly of the Presbyterian Church of the Philippines
  - Northern Presbytery of the National Capital Region of the Presbyterian Church of the Philippines
- Rwanda
  - Reformed Presbyterian Church in Africa (Rwanda)
- Sierra Leone
  - Presbyterian Church of Sierra Leone
  - Mount Zion Presbyterian Church of Sierra Leone
- Serbia
  - Protestant Reformed Christian Church in Serbia
- Trinidad and Tobago
  - Reformed Bible Churches of Trinidad and Tobago
- Uganda
  - Orphans and Widows Ministry
- United States of America
  - International Peacemaking Church of Christ, Raleigh NC
  - Reformed Baptist Churches in North America
  - United Christian Church and Bible Institute, USA

== Difference from other global communions ==
The World Reformed Fellowship (WRF) is different from other global Reformed communions in that it allows a wide range of churches for membership. While the International Conference of Reformed Churches only allows membership to Presbyterians and Continental Reformed Churches, the WRF includes, in addition to these, Congregationalists, Reformed Baptists, Reformed Anglicans, and Reformed Pentecostals. This is because its confessional base is extremely broad, allowing any position on baptism, ordination, eschatology, ecclesiology and pneumatology.

Even the largely liberal and ecumenical World Communion of Reformed Churches does not accept Baptists, Anglicans or Pentecostals as full members and considers them other denominational families. From this perspective, the World Reformed Fellowship applies a new concept of Reformed Christianity, giving it greater breadth than it has historically had meant.
