= Presbyterian Church of Uruguay =

Calvinist denomination

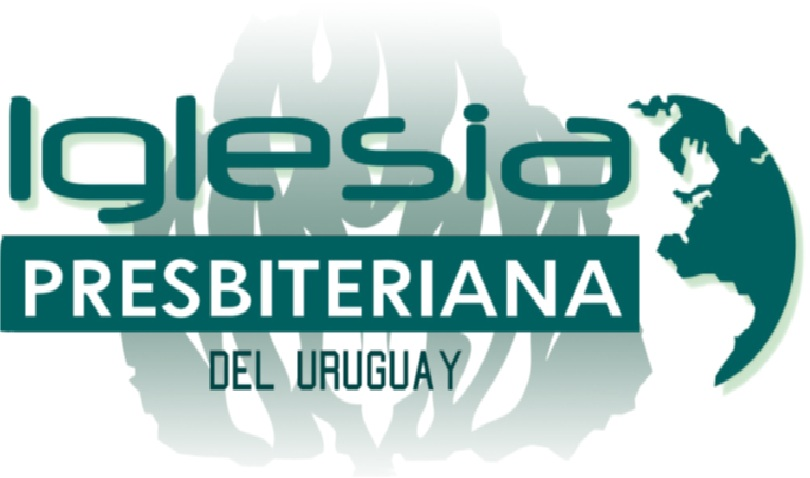
- Classification: Protestant
- Orientation: Confessional and Conservative
- Theology: Calvinism
- Governance: Presbyterian
- Associations: World Reformed Fellowship
- Region: Uruguay
- Origin: 2009
- Branched from: Presbyterian Church of Brazil
- Congregations: 2
- Official website: ipuy.org.uy

The Presbyterian Church of Uruguay (in Spanish Iglesia Presbiteriana del Uruguay or IPUY) is a Protestant Reformed, confessional, conservative and Calvinist denomination in Uruguay, formed by missions of the Presbyterian Agency for Transcultural Missions of the Presbyterian Church of Brazil.

The work of the church began in Uruguay's capital, Montevideo, and extended to congregations in other cities of the country.

== History ==
Presbyterianism has been around since 1560, having grown out of the formation of the Church of Scotland, through the work of the reformer John Knox. This, he was the reformer of his country after having spent years in Geneva with John Calvin. As such, Presbyterianism is a family of Reformed Churches and Calvinism.

In 2009, the Presbyterian Agency for Transcultural Missions of the Presbyterian Church of Brazil began missionary work in Montevideo in Uruguay. In 2014 the church was officially organized and founded a congregation in Mercedes.

The church has a seminary to train its own workers and ordains Uruguayan priests and deacons.

== Doctrine ==
The Presbyterian Church of Uruguay is a conservative church, and has conservative attitudes regarding ordination and doctrine. The church admits only men as deacon, elder, or minister.

The church system of government is Presbyterian, the church is evangelical, believes in biblical inerrancy and subscribes to the Westminster confession of faith.

== Inter-church relations ==
The denomination is a member of the World Reformed Fellowship. It has the help of the Presbyterian Agency for Transcultural Missions of the Presbyterian Church of Brazil for the planting of new churches in the country. It has relations with the Presbyterian Church in America, Orthodox Presbyterian Church and Presbyterian Church of Chile.
