= Zomi Baptist Convention of Myanmar =

Baptist Christian denomination in Myanmar

The Zomi Baptist Convention of Myanmar is a Baptist Christian denomination in Myanmar. It is affiliated with the Asia Pacific Baptist Federation and the Baptist World Alliance. Their headquarters are in Sagaing.

== History ==
The Zomi Baptist Convention was established in Burma in 1952. Its first Chairman was Rev'd ST. Gou Hau.

During the triennial meeting of the Zomi Baptist Convention in Khuasak in April 1995, four associations broke away from the convention to form the new Zomi Baptist Convention of Myanmar: Tonzang Township Baptist Association (TTBA), Tedim Baptist Association (TBA), Kale Zomi Baptist Association (KZBA), and Tamu Valley Baptist Association (TVBA). The new organization associated with the Southern Baptist Convention. However, of the four associations, the Tedim Baptist Association later withdrew from the new organization and remained under the Myanmar Baptist Convention.

It later added four more associations; the Zanggam Zomi Baptist Association (ZZBA), Cikha Township Baptist Association (CTBA), the Heilei Baptist Association (HBA) and Tedim Baptist Churches Association (TBCA). It also affiliated with Zomi Baptist Churches of America (ZBCA).

== Early 21st century ==
According to a census published by the association in 2023, it claimed 190 churches and 15,770 members.

In 2019, the ZBCM joined the Baptist World Alliance. They joined during the 2019 Annual Gathering of the BWA and became the 240th member body of the organization. At that time the ZBCM was led by Tuan Khan Mung (President), Lang Za Kap (General Secretary), Rev. Dr. Gin Khan Khual (Superintendent) and Rev. Dr. Gin Khan Khual.

== See also ==
- Religion in Myanmar
- Christianity in Myanmar
- Protestantism in Myanmar
