= Evangelical Presbyterian Church of Ivory Coast =

The Evangelical Presbyterian Church of Ivory Coast (Église Évangélique Presbytérienne de Côte d'Ivoire in French) is a confessional Presbyterian denomination in Ivory Coast.

Originally, members of the church were Korean diplomats, businessmen, and others residing in Ivory Coast in the early 1980s. In 1986, pastor In-chul Kim founded the first Korean church in Abidjan. He was succeeded by pastor Sang Ho Kwak following his departure in 1990. On January 6, 1994 an assembly was held in the Korean Presbyterian Community to define the constitution and bylaws. In 1996 Rev. Peter Paek (Sung Chul Paek) was set by the Korean Presbyterian Church in America to the Abidjan-based church. Later the church begun to expand to all regions of the country through the tremendous work of indigenous ministers like Yao Kassi Paul at Abobo, KOFFI at Bouaké, METCHE Samuel at Dabou, KOUAKOU Naka at Cocody Riviera Palmeraie and HAÏBA at Bingerville. The church has 26 congregations and 133 house fellowships in the country. Churches are in Abidjan, Anyama, Abobo, Abengourou, Aboisso, Bingerville, Dabou, Duékoué, Divo, Danané, Issia, N'Douci, Sassandra, San Pedro, Yopougon and Yaobou. The church is headed by Rev. Peter Peak since 1994.

The churches are banded into districts, namely the South District, the West Central District, the West District, East District and Southwest District.

In 2000, by the initiative of Pastor KOUAKOU Naka, YAO Kassi Paul and ADAHOU Solomon, the Evangelical Presbyterian Theological Institute in Ivory Coast was founded by missionaries from South Korea. After three years of training 11 pastors received their diplomas to serve the 160 Evangelical Presbyterian Church in Ivory Coast.

The headquarters of the church located in Abidjan, Cocody 2 Plateaux .

The church wants to start evangelisation efforts in Niger, Burkina Faso and the neighbouring countries.

The church is a member of the World Reformed Fellowship.
