= Presbyterian Church of Bangladesh =

- Classification: Protestant
- Orientation: Evangelical Reformed
- Theology: Calvinist
- Polity: Presbyterian
- Associations: World Reformed Fellowship
- Region: Bangladesh
- Founder: Rev Edward Ayub
- Origin: 1995
- Branched from: Presbyterian Church in America
- Congregations: 26 (2011)

The Presbyterian Church of Bangladesh (PCB) is a Reformed Churches conservative and evangelical in Bangladesh. Formed in 1995 by Rev. Edward Ayub, a former Muslim convert to Christianity, with the assistance of Presbyterian Church in America.

== History ==
The Presbyterian churches originate from the Protestant Reformation of the 16th century. It is the Christian churches Protestant that adhere to Reformed theology and whose ecclesiastical government is characterized by the government of an assembly of elders. Government Presbyterian is common in Protestant churches that were modeled after the Reformation Protestant Switzerland, notably in Switzerland, Scotland, Netherlands, France and portions of Prussia, of Ireland and later in United States.

In 1984, Reverend Edward Ayub, a former Muslim, was converted to Christianity. Later, in 1995, inspired by Asian Christian missionaries, and with the help of Presbyterian Church in America, he founded the Presbyterian Church of Bangladesh

Between 1996 and 1997, the denomination received assistance from Korean Presbyterian missionaries.

== The Presbyterian Church of Bangladesh today ==
Today the PCB works on church planting among the country's Muslim communities, so that most of its members are ex-Islamic converts to Christianity.

The church relies on financial and missionary support from Presbyterian Church in America to plant churches in Bangladesh. In addition, in 2015, greater involvement between the two churches was sought.

The PCB is a member of the World Reformed Fellowship which is a worldwide organization that brings together conservative Reformed churches. However, the church has a conservative rather than ecumenical missionary vision.
