= Isa-e Church =

- Classification: Protestant
- Orientation: Reformed
- Theology: Calvinist
- Governance: Presbyterian
- Associations: World Reformed Fellowship
- Region: Bangladesh and India
- Origin: 1999
- Congregations: 127 (2020)
- Members: 6,000 (2015)
- Official website: www.isaechurchbd.org www.isaechurchin.org

The Isa-e Church is a denomination Reformed Presbyterian in Bangladesh and India. It was founded in 1999 by Abdul Mabud Chowdhury, an ex-Muslim convert to Christianity.

== History ==
In 1985, Abdul Mabud Chowdhury, an ex-Muslim, converted to Christianity. After living abroad and becoming a pastor, Abdul returned to Bangladesh in 1997.

However, meeting with a group of former ex-Muslims, he acknowledged that the country's Christian denominations were culturally disconnected from the country's majority population. Chowdhury then begin working on establishing a church that adopts Bengali Muslim culture as tool of evangelization in the country.

On September 2, 1999, she was formed in Jamat Isa-e Bangladesh. Later, a denomination adopted the name "Isa-e Church Bangladesh".

The denomination soon spread across the country. As of 2015, it had 6,000 members in 127 local churches.

The Isa-e Theological Institute was founded by the denomination, which serves to prepare new pastors and leaders.

== Doctrine ==
The appellation affirms the Five Solae, practices pedobaptism, and adheres to Reformed Tradition.

== Inter-ecclesiastical Relations ==
The church is a member of the World Reformed Fellowship and has relations with the Reformed Churches in the Netherlands (Liberated).
