= Friends Missionary Prayer Band =

Friends Missionary Prayer Band (FMPB) is a missionary movement of Indian Christians. It was created in 1959.

== History ==
=== Founding ===
In 1937, the World Gospel Mission started the South India Bible Institute (now SIBS Ministries). The WGM later created the Vacation Bible School movement in India.

In 1952, in a small village called Kovilpatti in south Tamil Nadu, a VBS session was held with 75 children and 8 teachers. This was the start of a large Christian work in this area. From 26 to 30 December 1959 at 211 Dhanaskodi Street, Kovilpatti of Tirunelveli district of Tamil Nadu, 24 Vacation Bible School Friends gathered together.

Theodore Williams, Emil Jebasingh, John Christopher, JTK Daniel and Patrick Joshua also met for prayer at the nearby village of Pannaivilai in Tirunelveli. This developed into several larger prayer groups and a yearly Gideon Camps. This was a continuation of the 19th century work done in Pannaivilai by Amy Carmichael and Revd Isaaku Abhram, a local Indian clergyman. They started a Praying Movement which was later named Friends Missionary Prayer Band. At the time it was declared a praying group, not an organisation, church or society. The movement's main emphasis in its early period was the evangelisation of India.

Bishop Lesslie Newbigin of Madras Diocese became the second Patron of this movement. Following his advice, FMPB incorporated into its constitution the three historic creeds of the universal church to be added to the statement of faith of the Organisation. Revd Sam Kamalesan led the FMPB in new directions as its General Secretary.

In 1960, the group launched Araikooval, a prayer bulletin, which was published twice a year. Money raised from the magazine was sent to other missions and missionaries.

=== Mission work ===
During summer vacation in 1965 and 1966, the friends of FMPB conducted outreach in rural Tamil Nadu. One team went to Pettamugulalam in Panchamalai (Periyamalai), Hosur, about 100 km from Bangalore, and started a permanent mission. Harris Hilton became the first missionary with the support of his wife Padma Hilton. They were sponsored by the BHEL Thiruvarambur prayer group at Trichirapalli, Tamil Nadu.

The first mission station was started on 9 June 1967 at Periamalai. Hilton, Dr. Pushparaj and General Secretary Emil Jebasingh arrived in Periamalai. They bought a piece of land from Chendurayane Chetty and called the location Jehovah Jireh (meaning "God provides"). Esau and John Jacob joined Hilton that year. In 1968 the first office of FMPB was started in the house of Swamy Adiyal in Sayerpuram, where it was registered as a Society.

The movement's vision grew and the first mission field was opened in North India in 1971 with the eventual aim to reach the whole of India. Daisy Hilkiah and her husband were sent to Bhasti in Uttar Pradesh on 23 July 1971.

In 1972, a ten-year plan was formulated which included the following goals for 1982:

- 11 states – Jammu Kashmir, Punjab, Haryana, Himachal, Rajasthan, Uttar Pradesh, Madhya Pradesh, Bihar, Maharashtra, Gujarat, Orissa.
- 220 districts
- 440 missionaries

Trichirapalli prayer group leaders Hemachandran and Jacob organized the first sponsoring of the group, and financially supported the Hilton family. The first convert of the mission was a man named Raman. He and Allimuthu of Periamalai were baptized in 1979 at Bethel, Danishpet. Simon Roberts became the full-time promotional secretary. By this time the group's yearly income reached up to Rs. 10,000/-.

Operation Mobilisation trained the missionaries in Literature evangelism. The group began open air preaching and distributing Christian literature, including tracts, Bibles, New Testaments, and Gospel portions.

== Activity ==
From 1987 to 1997, the group were part of the "People movement" (the decade of harvest among people groups).

From 1997 to 2000, the group partnered with other Christian agencies.

In 2004, the group integrated Kukna churches with the CNI Gujarat Diocese. In 2006, the Malto churches were integrated with ECI.

Through the work of Indian missionaries, over 1150 churches have been established, with over 6600 congregations.
