= Bharatiya Jukta Christa Prachar Mandali =

Bharatiya Jukta Christa Prachar Mandali is a Mennonite denomination of India. Its name means India United Missionary Church. It has more than 5,000 members. It has more than 100 congregations.
