= Presbyterian Church of South India =

- Classification: Protestant
- Orientation: Reformed
- Theology: Calvinist
- Polity: Presbyterian
- Region: Andhra Pradesh
- Origin: 2002
- Branched from: Presbyterian Church in America
- Congregations: 70 (2020)
- Ministers: 37 (2018)

The Presbyterian Church of South India (PCSI) is a Presbyterian denomination, established in India, in 2002, as a result of the missionary work of the Presbyterian Church in America in Andhra Pradesh.

== History ==
The Presbyterian churches originate from the Protestant Reformation of the 16th century. It is the Christian churches Protestant that adhere to Reformed theology and whose form of ecclesiastical organization is characterized by the government of an assembly of elders. Government Presbyterian is common in Protestant churches that were modeled after the Reformation Protestant Switzerland, notably in Switzerland, Scotland, Netherlands, France and portions of Prussia, of Ireland and later in United States.

In the 1990s, missionaries from the Presbyterian Church in America started church planting work in Andhra Pradesh. As a result, in 2002, the Presbyterian Church of South India was formed.

From its growth, the denomination has reached 70 churches and congregations in 2020.

== Interchurch Relations ==
The denomination was once a member of the World Reformed Fellowship.
