= North India Tribal Mission =

NITM EMBLEM

The North India Tribal Mission (NITM) is a Christian education organisation. It has existed since 1987.

The mission participates in education promotion programmes, child welfare and Church planting, specifically with remote tribal communities in India. It has adopted 24 children, most of whom are orphans.

It is an inter-denominational group, founded by Pastor Augustine Manickathan, who grew up in a Roman Catholic family in Kerala.
