= Reformed Presbyterian Church North East India =

The Reformed Presbyterian Church in North East India (RPCNEI) is a Christian church based in Manipur. It was established in 1835 by American missionaries including Rev. James R. Campbell who started the work in Saharanpur.

The denomination was officially organised in 1979 with seven households, and is the first denomination of the Reformed Presbyterian Church in North East India. In 2023 the RPCNEI has 14,038 members and 60 pastors across 104 congregations in North East India in Manipur, Assam, Mizoram, Tripura, Meghalaya. There is a growing church planting ministry in Myanmar. It also runs 177 schools and training institutes.

It accepts the Westminster Confession of Faith, the Westminster Shorter Catechism and Westminster Larger Catechism. The RPCNEI does not ordain women.

It is a member of the World Communion of Reformed Churches and the International Conference of Reformed Churches. It is also partnered with the Evangelical Fellowship of India, Micah Network International, North East India Council of Churches, Compassion East India and the Distant Neighbours project in the Netherlands.

The RPCNEI is a founding member of the Reformed and Presbyterian Fellowship and a member of the Evangelical Fellowship in India. The headquarters is located at Churachandpur in Manipur.

== See also ==
- Reformed Presbyterian Church of India
- Presbyterian Reformed Church in India
