= Christ Groups =

Christ Groups are a category of Christian churches in several countries, including India. The number of Christ Groups possibly exceeds 100,000. Already by 1980 the number of groups in India was in the hundreds, if not more. It has been claimed, that there were 50,000 groups in India in 1996. The movement has been created by the Every Home Crusade. The Christ Groups belong to the Renewal.
