= Evangelical Presbyterian and Reformed Church in Peru =

The Evangelical Presbyterian and Reformed Church in Peru was established by missionaries from the Free Church of Scotland. In 1915, San Andres College was founded by John A, Mackay. Medical work was centered in Moyobamba and Cajamarca. The first church work was started in 1921. The first church was built in Cajamarca in 1936 with 600 people present. The work spread to Tarapoto and Chachapoyas. But there was shortage of pastors and elders. The first General Assembly was held in 1963 with 5 presbyteries namely the Amazonas, Cajamarca, Lima, Celendin and San Martin, and the church become independent. The name of the denomination was Evangelical Presbyterian Church of Peru. The church had 3,000 members.

American Missionaries, of Bible Presbyterian Church, established another church in 1936. The first General assembly was held in 1970. The name of the denomination was National Presbyterian Church of Peru. In 1983 the church had 11 presbyteries with 8,000 members.

These churches were united in 1995 to form the Evangelical Presbyterian and Reformed Church in Peru. In the early 2000s the EPRCP had 140 congregations and 15,000 members in Peru. Member of the World Reformed Fellowship.

The church maintains the Evangelical Presbyterian Theological Seminary in Lima.

== See also ==
- Iglesia Evangélica Presbiteriana de Moyobamba
- Iglesia Evangélica Presbyteriana de Callao
