= Laymen's Evangelical Fellowship International =

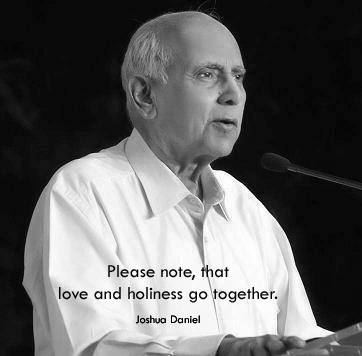
Bro.Joshua Daniel

Laymen's Evangelical Fellowship International is a Christian organization founded in 1935 in Madras, India by N. Daniel (1897-1963/12/18), a former mathematics teacher at McLaurin High School in Kakinada, Andhra Pradesh, was headed from 1963 to 2014 by his son Joshua Daniel (1928/02/06 - 2014/10/18), and now by John Daniel his grandson.

Headquartered in Chennai, India, the Church has centres in many parts of India, and around the world.

In addition to the many "tentmaker" missionaries (supported through their own work rather than by the organisation) in many countries, the message of the gospel goes out via the TV, Radio and printed literature in many languages.
