= Evangelical Presbyterian Church of Malawi =

Reformed Christian church located in Malawi

The Evangelical Presbyterian Church of Malawi is a Reformed Christian church in Malawi. In 2009 the church had 20 congregations and an average of six house fellowships. Average membership per congregation is 250 persons. Member of the World Reformed Fellowship.
