= Presbyterian Church of Senegal =

Protestant denomination

- Classification: Protestant
- Orientation: Reformed
- Theology: Calvinist Confessional
- Polity: Presbyterian
- Associations: World Reformed Fellowship
- Region: Senegal
- Founder: Mamadou Diop
- Origin: 2004
- Congregations: 20 (2017)
- Members: 800 (2017)

The Presbyterian Church of Senegal (PCS) – in French Eglise Presbytérienne du Sénégal – is a Reformed Churches appellation Presbyterian in Senegal. It was founded in 2004 by Pastor Mamadou Diop.

== History ==
In 2004, the pastor Mamadou Diop founded the Presbyterian Church of Senegal. Since then, the denomination has grown to reach a total of 20 churches and 800 members in 2017.

In the following years, Pastor Moussa Diouf separated from the denomination and founded the Evangelical Presbyterian Church of Senegal.

== Inter-church Relations ==
The denomination is a member of the World Reformed Fellowship. In addition, it receives help from the National Union of Independent Reformed Evangelical Churches of France for the training of pastors and social works.

IPS works to establish a federation with other Presbyterian denominations in West Africa called Presbyterian Churches of West Africa.
