= South India Reformed Churches =

Conservative Calvinist denomination in India

The South India Reformed Churches is a conservative Calvinist denomination in south India. This denomination is located in Andhra Pradesh and is a Calvinist church mission of the United States. It has eight congregations with many children's homes.

The denomination was formed in 1993 by a former Baptist pastor, Rev Abraham, who had become more and more inclined toward Calvinist theology, including paedobaptism. Meanwhile, three small congregations were established in Bagalur, Salem and Bangalore. It places high priority of evangelization among Hindu people. The Presbyterian Theological Seminary in India provides the theological training. Sister church relations with the Reformed Churches in the Netherlands (Liberated) were established.

In Tamil Nadu state of India there are three congregations. In 2011 six independent congregations joined the small federation. In 2012, another 6 congregations and pastors joined the church. In six cities, there are new church development projects.

It is a member of the World Reformed Fellowship.
