= Reformed Presbyterian Church in Myanmar =

- Classification: Protestant
- Orientation: confessional Calvinist
- Theology: Reformed Evangelical
- Governance: Presbyterian
- Associations: World Reformed Fellowship, World Communion of Reformed Churches
- Founder: Dr. Tial Hlei Thanga
- Origin: 1995; Myanmar
- Branched from: Presbyterian Church in America
- Congregations: 35
- Members: 2,000-2,500
- Ministers: 16 pastors and 10 missionaries

The Reformed Presbyterian Church in Myanmar (or Burmese Mizo) is a conservative Reformed denomination in Myanmar.

== History ==
The Reformed Presbyterian Church in Myanmar was founded on December 1, 1995 by Dr. Tial Hlei Thanga. He studied from 1987 to 1994 at the Reformed Theological Seminary in Jackson, Mississippi, United States. Dr. Thanga belongs to the Hualngo tribe in northern Chin State. Members are primarily from the Mizo Chin, Mru, Bhama, and Karen tribe. It is an autonomous and self-supporting and active in Evangelism Explosion, disciple building, and church planting ministry.

== Doctrine ==
The denomination's confessional standards are the :

- Westminster Confession of Faith
- Westminster Larger Catechism
- Westminster Shorter Catechism

=== Creeds ===
- Apostles Creed

There are no ordination of women. The denomination had 15 organized churches and 20 mission churches 15 house with 2,500 members 15 local sessions, 3 Presbyteries and a General Assembly, 3 mission fields in 2013.

== Statistics ==
The church currently has 15 organized churches and 20 unorganized mission stations served by 16 pastors, 10 missionaries, 35 elders and 5 school teachers. The combined membership is 2,000-2,500 in 3 Presbyteries within the General Assembly. There are minimum one evangelists in each Presbyteries. There are about 33-35 churches and missions, outreaches to the Bahma people was established since 1998. Goals are to plant indigenous churches and building disciples with the Word of God especially among the unreached people groups. Since 1987 the Reformed Presbyterian Church in Myanmar has partnership with the PCA.

The church maintains the Myanmar Reformed Theological Seminary & Discipleship Training Center which was founded on 30 July 1995 by Dr. Tial Hlei Thanga.

== Interchurch organizations ==
The Reformed Presbyterian Church in Myanmar is a member both of the World Reformed Fellowship and the World Communion of Reformed Churches.

The Reformed Presbyterian Church in Myanmar is a member of the Reformed and Presbyterian Churches Fellowship in Myanmar.

The Reformed Presbyterian Church in Myanmar is a member of "Myanmar Evangelical Churches Alliance."
