= Presbyterian Church in Colombia (Reformed Synod) =

This denomination is a Reformed denomination that has 4 Presbyteries and 1 Synod in Colombia. In 2004 it had 5,672 members and 15 congregations and 65 house fellowships served by 45 pastors. The church performs ordinations of women. The Apostles Creed, the Nicene Creed, Heidelberg Catechism and Westminster Confession are the officially recognised standards.

The Presbyterian Church of Colombia prohibits same sex/gender marriage. Its constitution defines marriage as a union between a man and a woman.
