= Reformed Evangelical Church of Myanmar =

Evangelical Reformed Church of Myanmar
- Classification: Protestant
- Theology: confessional Reformed
- Governance: Presbyterian
- Associations: World Reformed Fellowship
- Region: Myanmar
- Founder: Rev. Dr. Thang Bwee
- Origin: 1992; Chin State, Myanmar
- Congregations: 40
- Members: 7,000
- Ministers: 36

The Evangelical Reformed Church of Myanmar is a Reformed, Christian Church in the country of Myanmar (formerly Burma). It holds to the Westminster Confession of Faith

== History ==
The church was formally organised in 1998. It was established by Rev. Dr. Thang Bwee. Main activities and church planting is located in the Southern part of Chin State. For many years the church struggled without help. In the early 2000s, the denomination suffered a split because some pastors questioned the Reformed doctrine of church government, preferring one-man leadership over their churches. About one-third of the congregations withdrew, mostly to Pentecostal Churches. In 2003, a mission partnership was made with the Presbyterian Church of Australia, and shortly after organisation, the denomination grew to 1,800 members; by 2000 the church grew to 2,500 followers; and by 2008, the denomination had about 7,000 members and 40 churches. Presently, there are 36 ministers working both in Chin State and in Yangon Division, with Presbyterian church government.

The church celebrated its 20th anniversary on October 22, 2012.

== Theology ==
=== Creeds ===
- Apostles Creed

=== Confessions ===
- Westminster Confession of Faith
- Westminster Larger Catechism
- Westminster Shorter Catechism

== Relationship with other churches ==
The denomination is a member of the World Reformed Fellowship. Partner church relationship with the Presbyterian Church in Australia was established in 2003. The Evangelical Reformed Church is involved in church planting; they have planted 3 congregations around the wider Yangon area including Tarmwe, Htauk Kyant, and Tada townships. The ERC also has a relationship with the Reformed Church in America.

== Education and Seminary ==
The Reformed Bible Institute was formed in June 2000 and offers the degree of Bachelor of Theology.
