= Free Presbyterian Church, Kalimpong =

Church in Kalimpong

The Free Presbyterian Church, Kalimpong is a conservative Reformed and Presbyterian church in northern India. In this part of India the Church of Scotland missionaries did large mission work since 1870. This mission withdrew from the country in 1948. In 1970 several Christian denomination become part of the Church of North India. This denomination accepted the episcopal church government. Opposition against this government grew significantly in different areas to form a new denomination. In 1972 the Free Presbyterian Church, Kalimpong was formed as a separated church. It expanded rapidly and an addition of 4 congregation were instituted. Later a Presbytery was formed. Two districts were formed the Darjeeling and Kalimpong. Now it has 22 congregations and 35 not yet instituted churches, 9 pastors 30 full-time and 12 part-time evangelists. Sister church relations with the Reformed Churches in the Netherlands (Liberated) was established in May 2005.

The church main goal is to establish dozens of congregations in the Himalaya foothills area. In 2012 more than 160 people come to faith by evangelism in the region. In the neighbouring Bhutan the first church was also founded.
