= Reformed Presbyterian Church of India =

Christian denomination

The Reformed Presbyterian Church of India is a historic confessional Presbyterian denomination in India, established in the 19th century by Scottish and Irish missionaries.

== Origin ==
The Reformed Presbyterian Church of India was a joint effort of the Reformed Presbyterian Church in Ireland and Scotland in 1823, and established 12 congregations in India by a team of three ministers, namely Alexander Crawford, James Glasgow and D. Mitchell. The present situation is that the church has one active presbytery.

In the 1930 and 1940s the Bible Presbyterian Church helped to establish churches; The BPC later became part of the RPC’s Saharnapur Presbytery.

The church subscribes to the Westminster Confession of Faith, Westminster Larger and Shorter Catechism, the Apostles’ Creed and the Nicene Creed.

The Reformed Presbyterian Church in India is a member of the World Reformed Fellowship, International Conference of Reformed Churches and the Evangelical Fellowship in India.

In the 2020s, the denomination's goal is to establish several congregations in Uttarakhand, Uttar Pradesh, and New Delhi.

== Structure ==
The Reformed Presbyterian Church in India had two presbyteries in the past with one inactive at present:

- Nav Jeevan Presbytery in Dehradun - also known as NJP
- Reformed Bible Presbytery in New Delhi - also known as RBP (Inactive)

The denomination is active in Uttaranchal State, Delhi and Uttar Pradesh. In 2023, it has 10 fellowships and 5 charges. The central office is located in Dehradun, Uttarakhand.

In 2004, the RPC in India had 3000 members with 14 clergy and 31 elders and deacons.

== Theological education ==
- Presbyterian Theological Seminary

== See also ==
- Reformed Presbyterian Church North East India
- Presbyterian Reformed Church in India
