= United Reformed Church in Myanmar =

Calvinist denomination in Myanmar

The United Reformed Churches in Myanmar is a confessional conservative Calvinist denomination in Myanmar.

It has 16 local churches (5 in Yangon Classis, 5 in Kalay Classis and 6 in Falam Claasis) and two mission fields. There are 17 ordained clergy in 2019. The Church adheres to the Three Forms of Unity (Belgic Confession, Heidelberg Catechism and Canons of Dort), the Apostles Creed and the Westminster Confession of Faith.

It is a member of the World Reformed Fellowship.

The denomination is a founding member of the Reformed and Presbyterian Fellowship in Myanmar in 2008.
