= Evangelical Presbyterian Church of Myanmar =

The Evangelical Presbyterian Church of Myanmar was founded by Reverend Robert Thawm Luai in 1983. Members of this Church were once affiliated with different Christian denominations and churches, eventually seceding due to liberalism, ecumenism and charismatism.

As of 2004, this denomination consisted of 35 individual churches, 13 house fellowships and 5,000 members. It was served by 40 pastors in 4 Presbyteries and a General assembly. The Evangelical Presbyterian Church subscribes to the Apostles Creed and the Westminster Confession of Faith. Women are not ordained.

The denomination is a member of the World Reformed Fellowship and the World Communion of Reformed Churches. The church's partner denomination is the Life Bible Presbyterian Church in Singapore.

The Evangelical Presbyterian Church of Myanmar founded the Reformed and Presbyterian Churches Fellowship in Myanmar in 2005. Ten denominations participate in the "Fellowship".
