= Continental Reformed Protestantism =

Reformed church originating in continental Europe

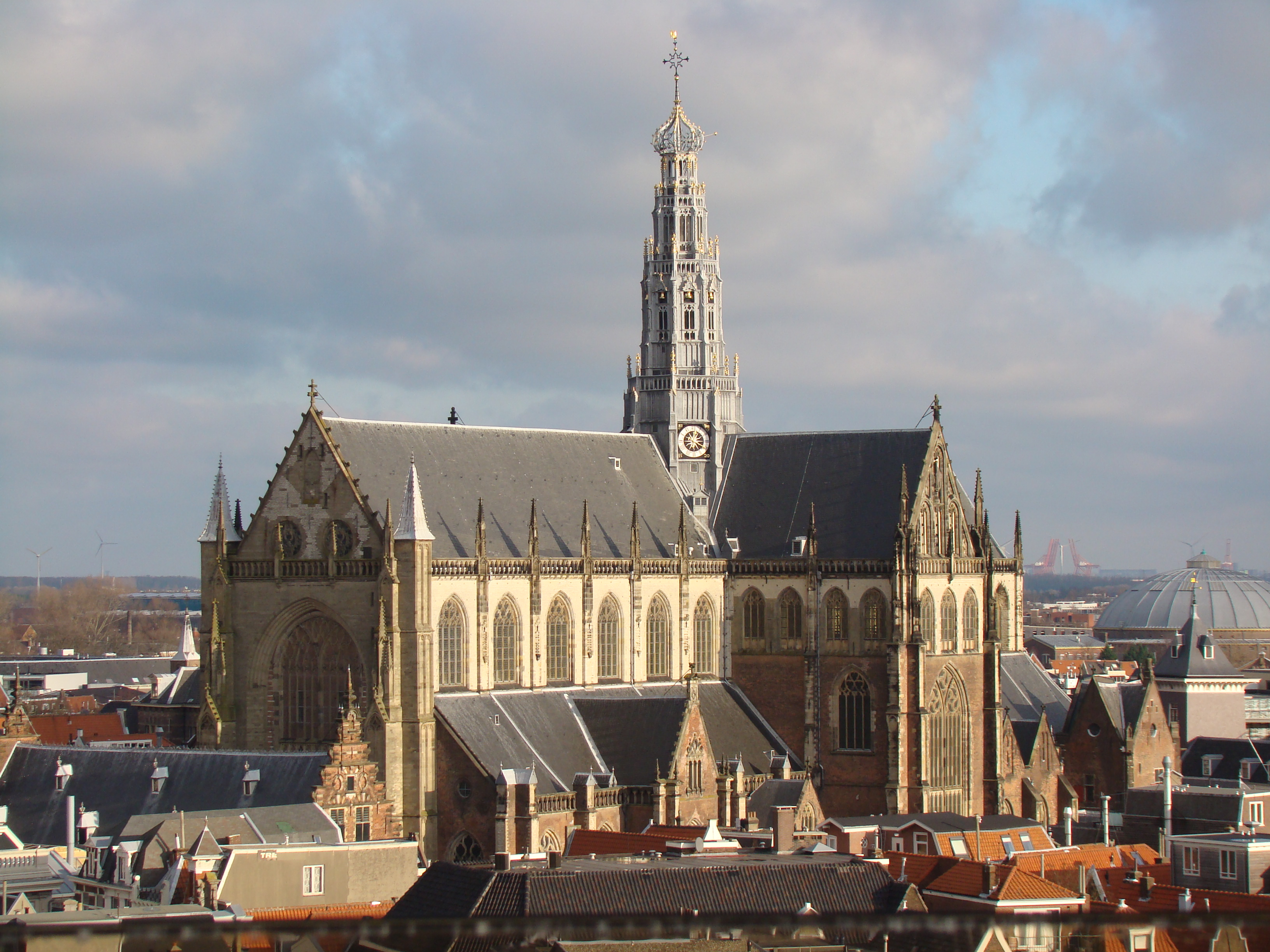
Saint Bavo's Reformed Church in Haarlem, Netherlands

Continental Reformed Christianity or Continental Reformed Protestantism is a part of Reformed Christianity within Protestantism that traces its origin to continental Europe. Prominent subgroups are the Dutch Reformed, Swiss Reformed, French Huguenot, Hungarian Reformed, and German Reformed churches. The historic doctrine of the Continental Reformed churches is explicated in the Three Forms of Unity: the Belgic Confession, the Canons of Dort, and the Heidelberg Catechism.

The Continental Reformed churches are distinguished from the Presbyterian, Congregational, Reformed Anglican or other Calvinist churches, which can trace their origin to the British Isles or elsewhere in the world. Notably, their theology is largely derived from the Swiss Reformation, as Switzerland (specifically Geneva and Zürich) was a base for the most influential Reformed theologians of the era. It was inaugurated by Huldrych Zwingli, who formulated the first expression of the Reformed faith. Swiss Reformation was more fully articulated by Martin Bucer, Heinrich Bullinger and especially John Calvin, who became recognized as the leading figure in the Reformed tradition. In the sixteenth century, the movement spread to most of continental Europe, sometimes with the protection of monarchs or members of the nobility, as in the Netherlands, Switzerland, Hungary, some German states, and France.

Continental Reformed churches are represented in the International Conference of Reformed Churches, World Communion of Reformed Churches, and World Reformed Fellowship.

== History ==
The first Reformed (Calvinist) churches were established in Europe after 1519 and were part of the Protestant Reformation. Reformed doctrine is expressed in various confessions. A few confessions are shared by many denominations. Different denominations use different confessions, usually based on historical reasons.

The continental Reformed churches had an impact on Anglicanism and Presbyterianism during the Protestant Reformation in England and the Scotland, It continued to influence the Church of England and Church of Scotland through the Puritans, who wished to reform them along continental lines.

== Beliefs and practices ==
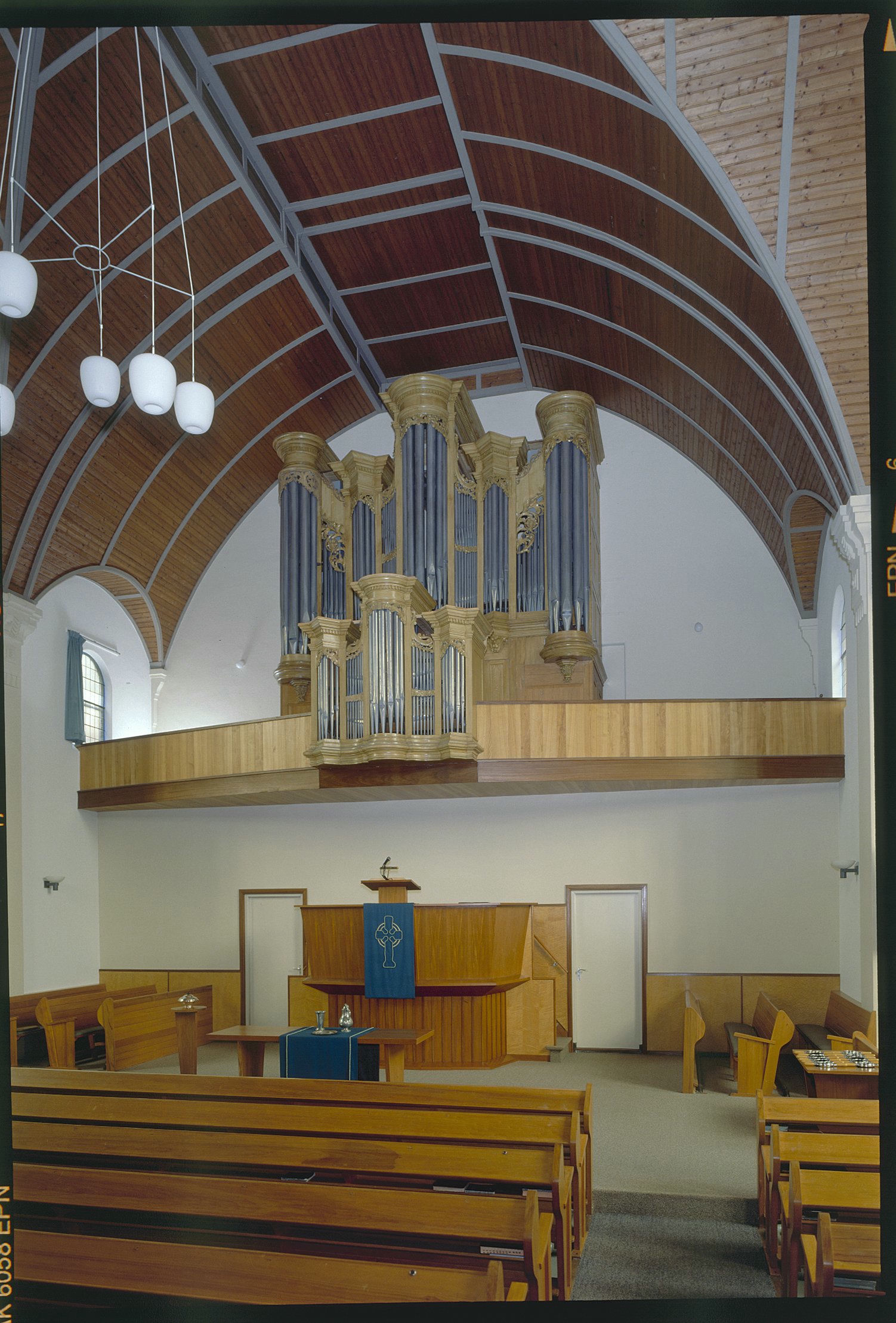
The chancel of the Barnabas Reformed Church in Apeldoorn, Netherlands. The baptismal font and communion table are seen in the centre, with the pulpit in the back.

The following is a chronological list of confession and theological doctrines of the Reformed churches:

- First Helvetic Confession (1536)
- Consensus Tigurinus (1549)
- French Confession (1559)
- Scots Confession (1560)
- Three forms of Unity
  - Heidelberg Catechism (1563)
  - Belgic Confession (1566)
  - Canons of Dordrecht (1619)
- Second Helvetic Confession (1566)
- Helvetic Consensus (1675)
- Barmen Declaration (1934)

=== Sacraments and rites ===
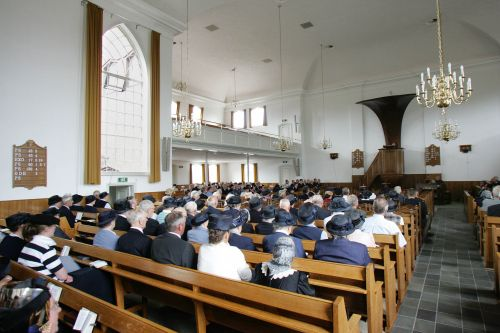
Worship in the Restored Reformed Church in Doornspijk, Netherlands

==== Holy Baptism ====
In the Continental Reformed tradition, duly ordained ministers administer the sacrament of Holy Baptism. The Continental Reformed churches do not hold that elect infants receive baptismal regeneration through this sacrament. Holy Baptism is the sign and seal of the covenant of grace. It initiates the candidate into church membership as well.

==== Holy Communion ====
The Continental Reformed churches teach a real spiritual presence of Christ in the Eucharist. This doctrine was developed by John Calvin and Heinrich Bullinger, who taught that Christ's person, including his body and blood, are presented to Christians who partake of it in faith.

==== Confession and Absolution ====
In the Continental Reformed tradition, confession and absolution is normatively practiced corporately, though confession on an individual basis is an approved rite:

SACERDOTAL CONFESSION AND ABSOLUTION But we believe that this sincere confession which is made to God alone, either privately between God and the sinner, or publicly in the Church where the general confession of sins is said, is sufficient, and that in order to obtain forgiveness of sins it is not necessary for anyone to confess his sins to a priest, mumuring them in his ears, that in turn he might receive absolution from the priest with his laying on of hands, because there is neither a commandment nor an example of this in Holy Scriptures. David testifies and says: “I acknowledged my sin to thee, and did not hide my iniquity; I said, `I will confess my transgressions to the Lord’; then thou didst forgive the guilt of my sin” (Ps. 32:5). And the Lord who taught us to pray and at the same time to confess our sins said: “Pray then like this: Our Father, who art in heaven,…forgive us our debts, as we also forgive our debtors” (Matt. 6:12). Therefore it is necessary that we confess our sins to God our Father, and be reconciled with our neighbor if we have offended him. Concerning this kind of confession, the Apostle James says: “Confess your sins to one another” (James 5:16). If, however, anyone is overwhelmed by the burden of his sins and by perplexing temptations, and will seek counsel, instruction and comfort privately, either from a minister of the Church, or from any other brother who is instructed in God’s law, we do not disapprove; just as we also fully approve of that general and public confession of sins which is usually said in Church and in meetings for worship, as we noted above, inasmuch as it is agreeable to Scripture. —Second Helvetic Confession

=== Liturgy ===
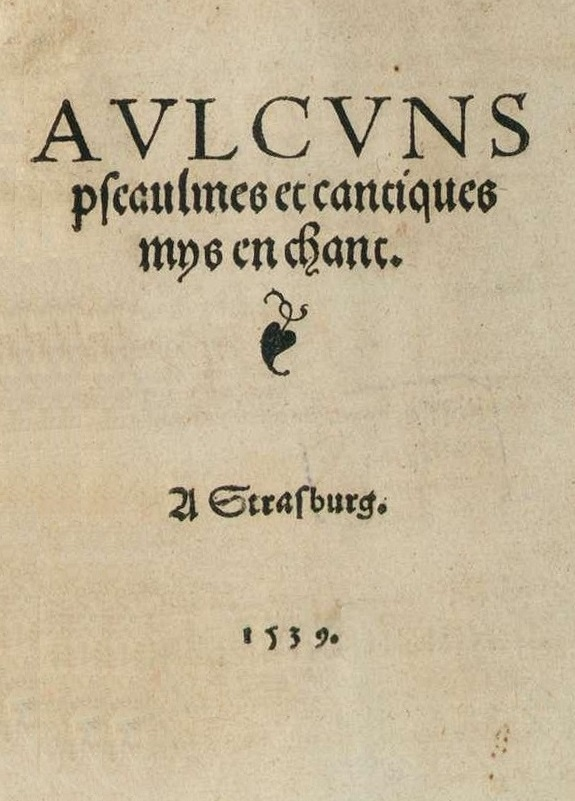
Title page of the 1539 Psalter, published in Strasburg when Calvin was a minister there. Calvin's psalters were called "Genevan" due to later editions after Calvin moved to Geneva.

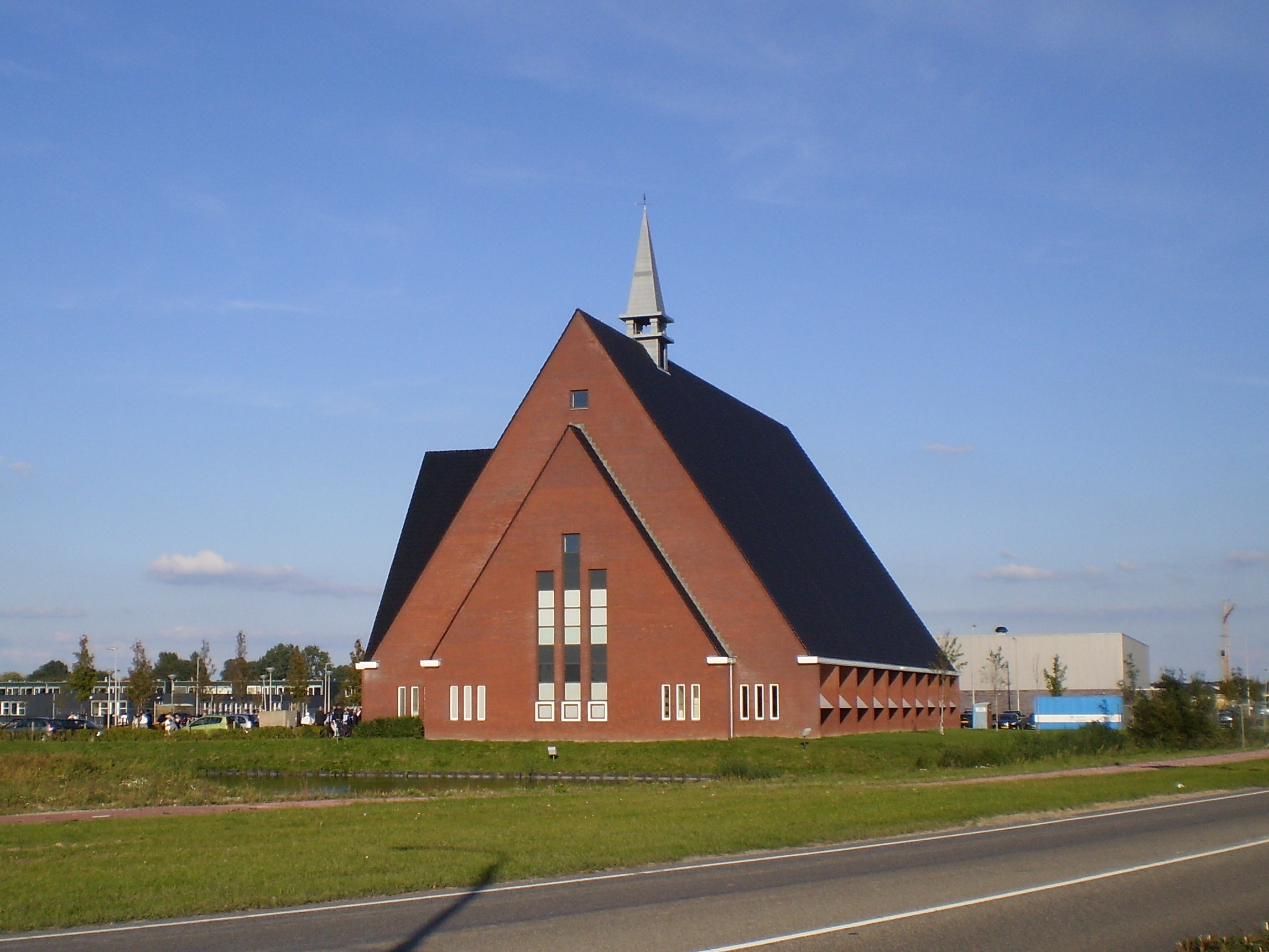
Netherlands Reformed Congregation of Barendrecht, South Holland

The Lord's Day liturgy in the Continental Reformed tradition includes the Apostle's Creed, Collection of Alms, Confession and Absolution, the Lord's Supper, Doxology, prayers, Psalms, the Lord's Prayer, Benediction, etc. The following is the Order of Service for the Lord's Day as designed by John Calvin, a key figure of the Reformed tradition:

Calvin: Strasbourg, 1540
Scripture Sentence (Psalm 124,8)
Confession of sins
Scriptural words of pardon
Absolution
Metrical Decalogue sung with Kyrie eleison after each Law
Collect for Illumination
Lection
Sermon
Liturgy of the Upper Room
Collection of alms
Intercessions
Lord's Prayer in long paraphrase
Preparation of elements while Apostles' Creed sung
Consecration Prayer
Words of Institution
Exhortation
Fraction
Delivery
Communion, while psalm sung
Post-communion collect
Nunc dimittis in metre
Aaronic Blessing

=== Covenant theology ===
The Continental Reformed churches uphold covenant theology, which interprets the "sacraments as seals of the covenant of grace, bearing God's promise of salvation, though only to the elect who would persevere in faith. Like the seal on a royal document, a sacrament guaranteed the validity of the Word that it bespoke."

=== Sunday Sabbatarianism ===
The Heidelberg Catechism of the Reformed churches founded by John Calvin, teaches that the moral law as contained in the Ten Commandments is binding for Christians and that it instructs Christians how to live in service to God in gratitude for His grace shown in redeeming mankind. The doctrine of the Christian Reformed Church in North America thus stipulates, with regard to the Lord's Day, "that Sunday must be so consecrated to worship that on that day we rest from all work except that which charity and necessity require and that we refrain from recreation that interferes with worship."

=== Marriage ===
Most Reformed churches in the world, such as the Netherlands Reformed Congregations and the Heritage Reformed Congregations, only support marriage between a man and a woman.

Some Reformed churches allow local churches to decide about blessings of same-sex marriage, such as the United Church of Christ (USA), the United Protestant Church of France and the Uniting Reformed Church in Southern Africa.

== Forms of government ==
In contrast to the episcopal polity of the Anglican and many Lutheran and Methodist churches, Continental Reformed churches are ruled by assemblies of "elders" or ordained officers. This is usually called Synodal government by the Continental Reformed, but is essentially the same as presbyterian polity, with the elders forming the consistory, the regional governing body known as the classis, and the highest court of appeal being the general synod.

The Reformed Church in Hungary, its sister church in Romania, the Hungarian Reformed Church in America, and the Polish Reformed Church are the only continental Reformed churches to have retained the office of bishop.

== Reformed churches worldwide ==
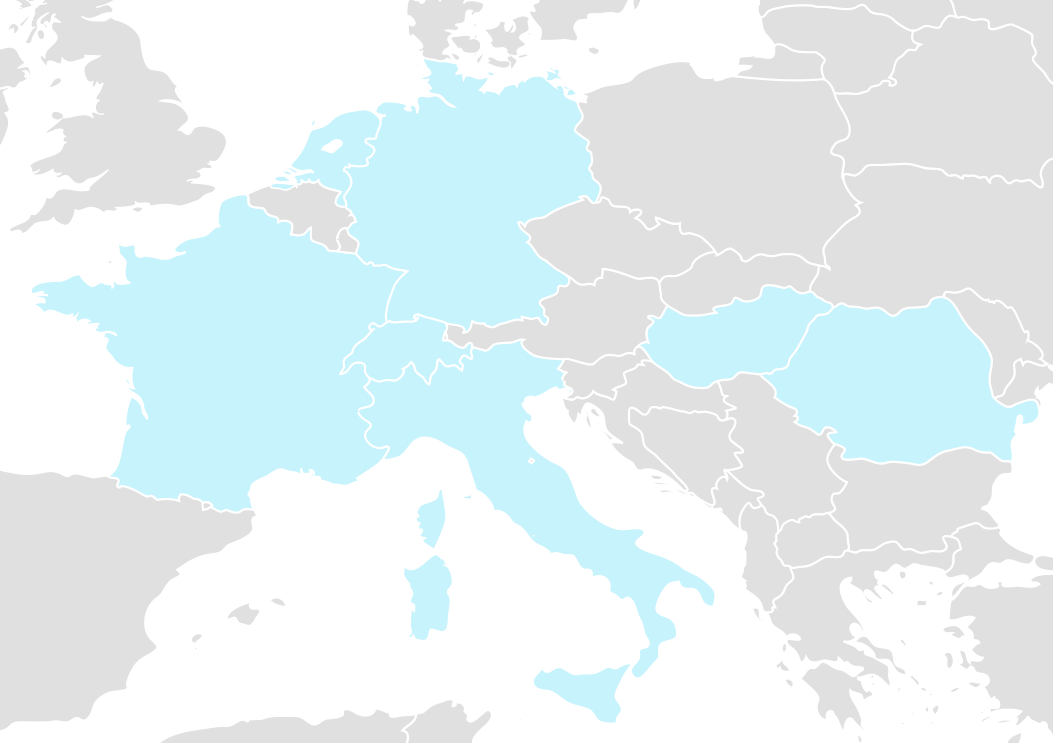
Countries with significant Continental Reformed churches

Many churches in the Continental Reformed tradition spread either by European immigration, or European and North American missionary work.

== See also ==
- Category: Reformed church seminaries and theological colleges
- Community of Protestant Churches in Europe
- Congregationalist polity
- World Alliance of Reformed Churches
- World Communion of Reformed Churches
- North American Presbyterian and Reformed Council
- List of Reformed denominations
