= Westminster Shorter Catechism =

Presbyterian manual of basic religious instruction

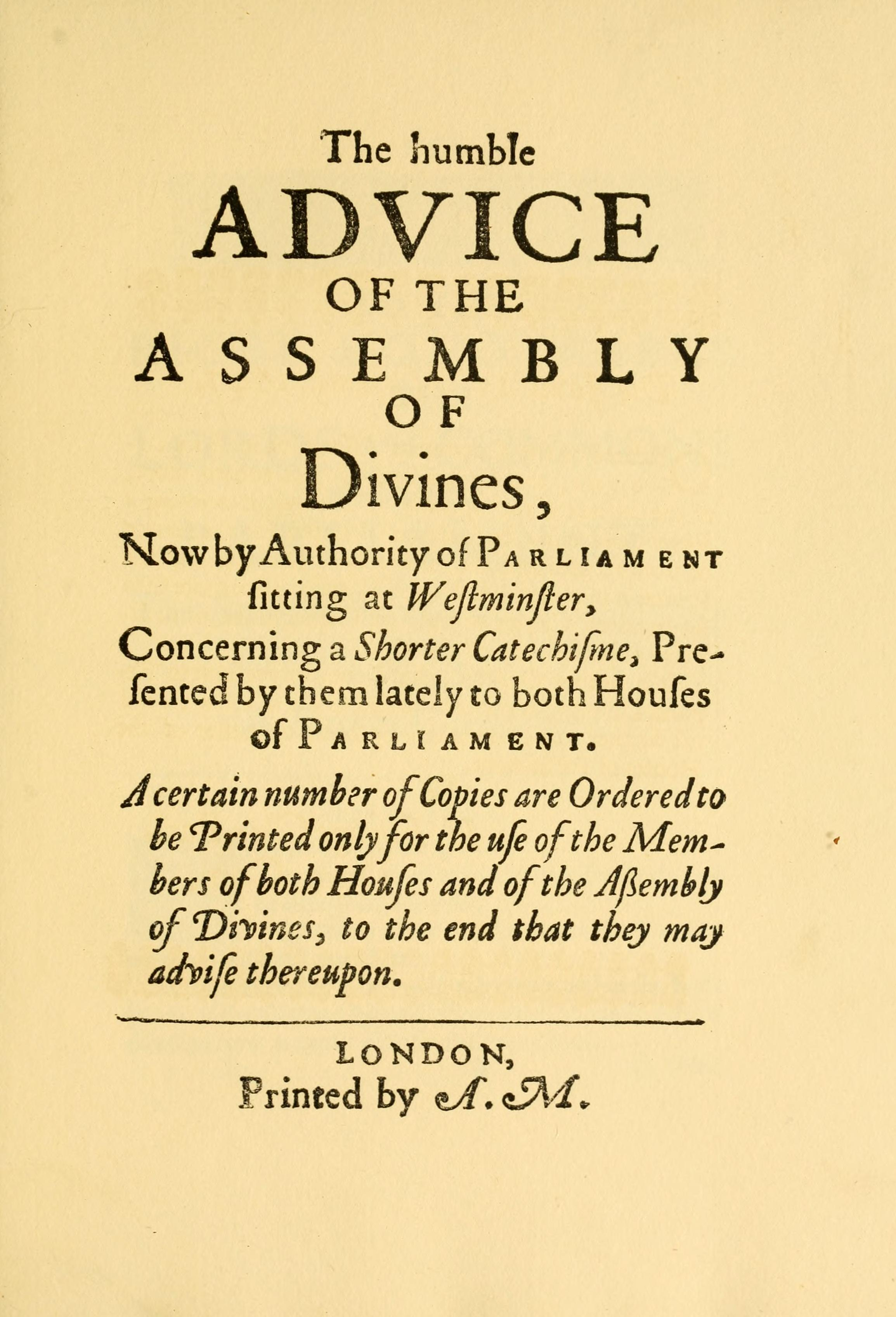
Facsimile of the title page of the first printing of the Shorter Catechism on 25 November 1647 without Scripture citations printed for distribution in Parliament

The Westminster Shorter Catechism is a catechism written in 1646 and 1647 by the Westminster Assembly, a synod of English and Scottish theologians and laymen intended to bring the Church of England into greater conformity with the Church of Scotland. The assembly also produced the Westminster Confession of Faith and the Westminster Larger Catechism. A version without Scripture citations was completed on 25 November 1647 and presented to the Long Parliament, and Scripture citations were added on 14 April 1649.

== Background ==
Catechesis is a practice of teaching the Christian faith. New converts to Christianity were taught through lectures during the first four centuries of the Church's existence, but this practice was largely abandoned with the rise of Christendom. Christian humanists and Protestant Reformers sought to revive the practice, including the Reformed. John Calvin's Genevan Catechism was especially influential among the British Reformed. The most popular British catechisms included works by John Craig, James Ussher, Herbert Palmer, John Ball, and Anthony Tuckney.

On John Knox's return to Scotland after long exile because he was deemed by the authorities a heretic, the First Book of Discipline (1560) was drafted. It required that a Sabbath afternoon session be set aside for examination of young children in catechism, and this practice eventually was adopted in the Kirk. Catechizing became a part of life in the Scottish Churches with itinerant catechists being employed to instruct the people—a practice that continued into the 19th century.

In 1643, the Westminster Assembly, which was designed to bring the two national churches into greater conformity, was convened at the height of the English Civil War to reform the Church of England. When the Solemn League and Covenant was as a result signed between the English and Scots the Assembly's work also became the framing of "four points or parts of uniformity": a Confession of Faith, Form of Church Government, Directory for Worship, and Catechizing.

== Composition ==
Although the church in Scotland (the Kirk) had produced The New Catechisme according to the Forme of the Kirk of Scotland in 1644, it was aimed particularly at children and youth, and was not adopted by the Westminster Assembly of Divines. Twelve or fourteen of the members of the Westminster Assembly had produced catechisms themselves prior to the Assembly. Herbert Palmer was one of the most respected catechists in the country, and it was expected that his catechism, first published in 1640, would be the basis for the Assembly's. It appears that this idea was abandoned by the committee assigned to the catechism after some work in 1645, followed by another failed attempt at a single catechism from the Summer of 1646 to 14 January 1647

At this point, the committee decided that it would need to produce two catechisms rather than one, as the needs of ministers and children were very different. The committee also decided to wait until the completion of the Confession of Faith, and to base the catechisms off this document rather than the Apostles' Creed. The Larger Catechism was completed and forwarded to Parliament on 22 October 1647, and another committee was set up for the Shorter Catechism composed of Herbert Palmer as chairman, Charles Herle, Thomas Temple, John Lightfoot, John Greene, Philip Delme, Edmund Calamy the Elder, and Stanley Gower. When Palmer died soon after the constitution of this committee, another committee was formed with only Anthony Tuckney, Stephen Marshall, and John Ward, along with Samuel Rutherford (one of the Scottish commissioners, who could not vote).

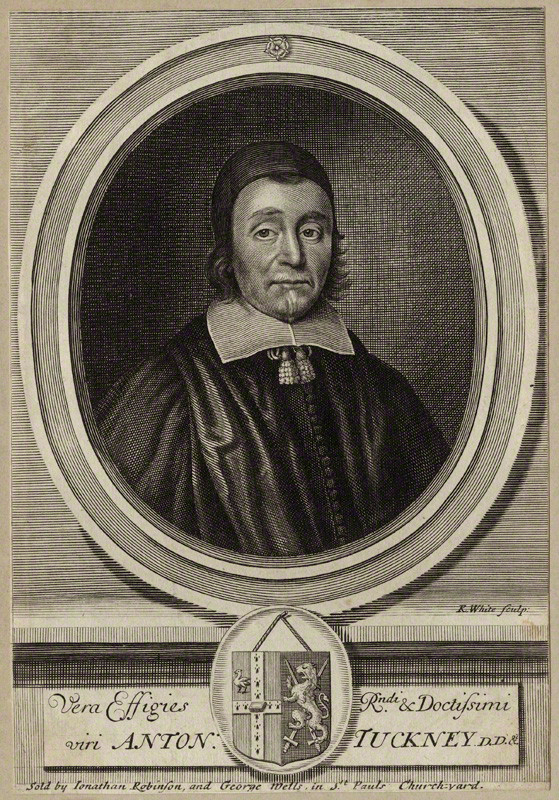
Anthony Tuckney

Anthony Tuckney is believed to be the most influential of the committee members on the Catechism. The previously published catechisms of James Ussher and John Ball, as well as the theology of William Perkins were also relied upon, however many of the similarities between the Assembly's Shorter Catechism and earlier ones may be explained by the common theological vocabulary of the time. The Shorter Catechism was largely based on the Larger Catechism, though the Shorter may have incorporated more of the earlier abandoned catechism than the Larger. It was sent to Parliament on 25 November 1647, a little over a month after the Larger Catechism. Scripture citations were added on 14 April 1648. It was passed Parliament 22–25 September and ordered to be printed with the title The Grounds and Principles of Religion Contained in a Shorter Catechism. The Church of Scotland approved it in July 1648, and it passed the Scottish Parliament in February of the next year.

== Form and content ==
The purpose of the Shorter Catechism is to educate children and others "of weaker capacity" (according to a preface written by the Church of Scotland) in the Reformed faith. It is based on the Larger Catechism, which was intended for use by ministers as they taught the faith to their congregations in preaching. The Catechism is in a question and answer format, which had been popularized by Martin Luther as a way to help children learn the meaning of the material, rather than simply memorizing the Lord's Prayer, Ten Commandments, and Apostles' Creed as had been the practice prior to the Reformation.

The catechism is composed of 107 questions and answers. The first 12 questions concern God as Creator. Questions 13–20 deal with original sin and the fallen state of man's nature. Questions 21–38 concern Christ the Redeemer and the benefits that flow from redemption. The next set of questions, 39–84, discuss the Ten Commandments. Questions 85–97 teach concerning the Sacraments of Baptism and Holy Communion. The final set of questions, 98–107, teach and explain the Lord's Prayer. This organization mimics the earlier Heidelberg Catechism used by many Continental Reformed churches.

The most famous of the questions (known to a great many Presbyterian children) is the first:

Q. What is the chief end of man?
A. Man's chief end is to glorify God, and to enjoy him forever.

== Legacy ==
The Church of Scotland approved the Westminster Shorter Catechism in 1648, and thereafter it was the manual for instruction. However, because a significant portion of the Scottish Highland population spoke only Gaelic, the Synod of Argyll in 1649 instructed seven of its ministers to translate the Westminster Shorter Catechism into that language. The result was published that same year, and the Gaelic Shorter Catechism continued to play a part in church life for decades after it had ceased to be used in the English speaking churches. The Free Church of Scotland still presents a Bible to a child who can answer all 107 questions accurately at one sitting.

In 1675, the Presbyterian Thomas Vincent in London published a popular exposition called The Shorter Catechism Explained. Later, Reformed catechisms such as the 1693 Baptist Keach's Catechism mimic the Westminster catechism on most points except infant baptism.

A revised version of the Shorter Catechism, authored to demonstrate the relationship between the Methodist movement and the Church of Scotland, was published in John Wesley's A Christian Library.

The Westminster Catechism is mentioned in Nathaniel Hawthorne's The Scarlet Letter, chapter eight, in reference to Pearl's ability to bear a fair examination by this catechism.

== See also ==
- Robert Moffat (missionary) — 19th century missionary in South Africa, who translated the Westminster Catechism into the Sechuana language.

== Bibliography ==
- Green, Ian (1996). The Christian's ABC: Catechisms and Catechizing in England c. 1530-1740. Oxford: Clarendon Press.
- Kelly, Douglas F. (1994). "The Westminster Shorter Catechism". In Carlson, John L.; Hall, David W. (eds.). To Glorify and Enjoy God: A Commemoration of the 350th Anniversary of the Westminster Assembly. Edinburgh: Banner of Truth Trust. ISBN 0-85151-668-8.
- Leith, John H. (1973). Assembly at Westminster: Reformed Theology in the Making. Richmond, VA: John Knox Press. ISBN 0-8042-0885-9.
- Paul, Robert S. (1985). The Assembly of the Lord: Politics and Religion in the Westminster Assembly and the 'Grand Debate'. Edinburgh: T&T Clark. ISBN 0-567-09341-7.
