= Westminster Larger Catechism =

Presbyterian manual of advanced religious instruction

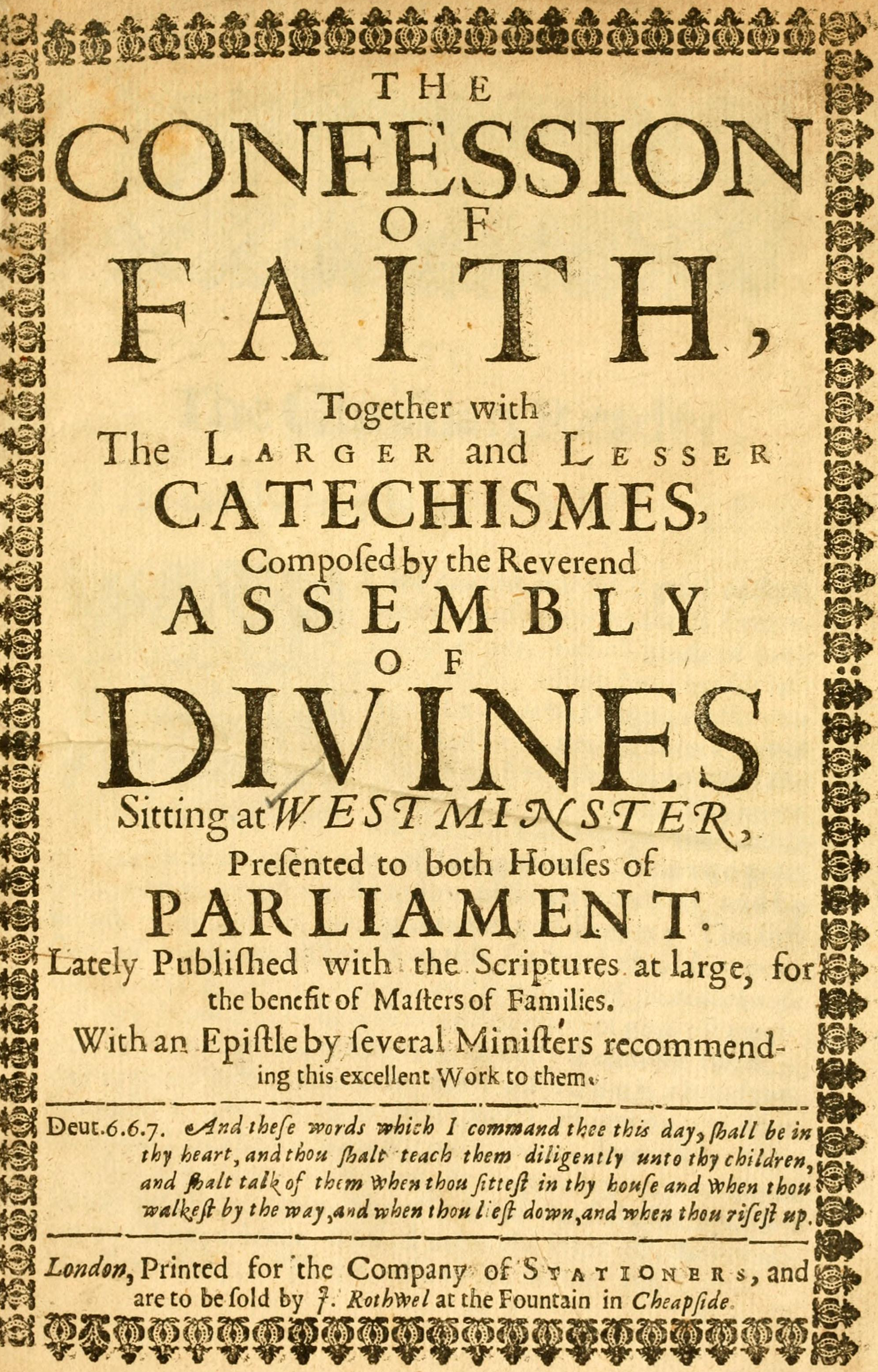
Title page from a printing of Westminster Confession of Faith, including the Larger and Shorter (or Lesser) Catechisms.

The Westminster Larger Catechism, along with the Westminster Shorter Catechism, is a central catechism of Calvinists in the English tradition throughout the world.

== History ==
In 1643 when the Long Parliament of England called the Westminster Assembly to produce the Westminster Confession, it also asked for a directory of "catechising". The Assembly asked Herbert Palmer to produce a draft of the Larger Catechism. Robert Baillie and other Scottish delegates found the work disappointing. In December 1643 a committee was formed to write the Catechism. In January 1647 the Assembly gave up writing one catechism and split it into two. The Westminster Shorter Catechism was to be "easier to read and concise for beginners" and the Larger Catechism was to be "more exact and comprehensive". The Catechism was completed by the Westminster Assembly in 1647. It was then adopted by the General Assembly of the Church of Scotland in 1648 and (with a slight modification to Q&A 109) by the Presbyterian Synod of New York and Philadelphia in 1788, and by the Presbyterian Church in the U.S.A., upon its formation the following year. In 1967, it was dropped by the United Presbyterian Church in the U.S.A. in the formulation of their Book of Confessions. However, it was embraced by the successor denominations such as the Presbyterian Church (U.S.A.) in that church's Book of Confessions as well as the more conservative successors, the Presbyterian Church in America (PCA), the Orthodox Presbyterian Church, the Evangelical Presbyterian Church, and the Bible Presbyterian Church.

== Form and content ==
The purpose of the Larger Catechism was to help ministers prepare their own catechesis, as they taught the faith to their congregations in preaching, while the purpose of the Shorter Catechism was to educate children and others "of weaker capacity" (according to a preface written by the Church of Scotland) in the Reformed faith. Both the Larger and Shorter Catechisms are in a question and answer format, which had been popularized by Martin Luther as a way to help children learn the meaning of the material, rather than simply memorizing the Lord's Prayer, Ten Commandments, and Apostles' Creed as had been the practice prior to the Reformation.

Being the larger of the two catechisms, the questions and answers go into much greater detail than the Shorter Catechism is summarizing the chief points of doctrine explained in the Westminster Confession. The Larger Catechism consists of 196 questions and answers. The first set of questions and answers, 1-5, concern the chief and highest end of man, the existence of God, and the Holy Scriptures as the Word of God. The next set of questions and answers, 6-90, concern God as Creator, original sin, the fallen state of man's nature, Christ the Redeemer, and the benefits that flow from redemption. Following that, the next set of questions, 91-152, discuss the duty God requires of man, as summarized in the Ten Commandments. Questions 153-177 concern the outward and ordinary means of grace, especially the preaching of the Word of God and the Sacraments of Baptism and Holy Communion. The final set of questions, 178–196, teach and explain prayer, using the Lord's Prayer as a model. This organization mimics the earlier Heidelberg Catechism used by many Continental Reformed churches.

== See also ==
- Westminster Shorter Catechism
