= Evangelical Reformed Church =

Evangelical Reformed Church may refer to:

- Evangelical Reformed Church in Germany
- Lithuanian Evangelical Reformed Church
- Evangelical Reformed Baptist Churches in Italy
- Evangelical Reformed Presbyterian Church
- Evangelical Reformed Church in Sweden
- Evangelical Reformed Church in Japan
- Evangelical Reformed Church of Christ
- Evangelical-Reformed Church in Poland
- Evangelical Reformed Church in Angola
- German Evangelical Reformed Church
- National Union of Independent Reformed Evangelical Churches of France
- Evangelical Reformed Church in Šidski Banovci
- High German Evangelical Reformed Church
- First Evangelical Reformed Church
- Evangelical Reformed Churches in Brazil
- Evangelical Reformed Churches in Poland
- Evangelical Reformed Parish, Warsaw
- Belarusian Evangelical Reformed Church
- Evangelical Reformed Church of Colombia
- Evangelical Reformed Church in Portugal
- Evangelical Reformed Church of Prussia
- Evangelical Reformed Church in Transcarpathia
- Evangelical Reformed Church (Westminster Confession)
- Union of Evangelical Reformed Churches in Russia
- Swiss Evangelical Reformed Church
  - Evangelical-Reformed Church of Appenzell
  - Evangelical Reformed Church of the Canton Basel-Landschaft
  - Evangelical-Reformed Church of the Canton Basel-Stadt
  - Evangelical Reformed Church of the Canton Freiburg
  - Evangelical Reformed Church of the Canton of Lucerne
  - Evangelical Reformed Church of the Canton of St. Gallen
  - Evangelical Reformed Church of the Canton of Schaffhausen
  - Evangelical-Reformed Church of Uri
  - Evangelical Reformed Church in Valais
  - Evangelical Reformed Church of the Canton of Vaud
  - Evangelical Reformed Church of the Canton of Zürich

== See also ==
- Evangelical Church (disambiguation)
