= Blessing of same-sex unions in Christian churches =

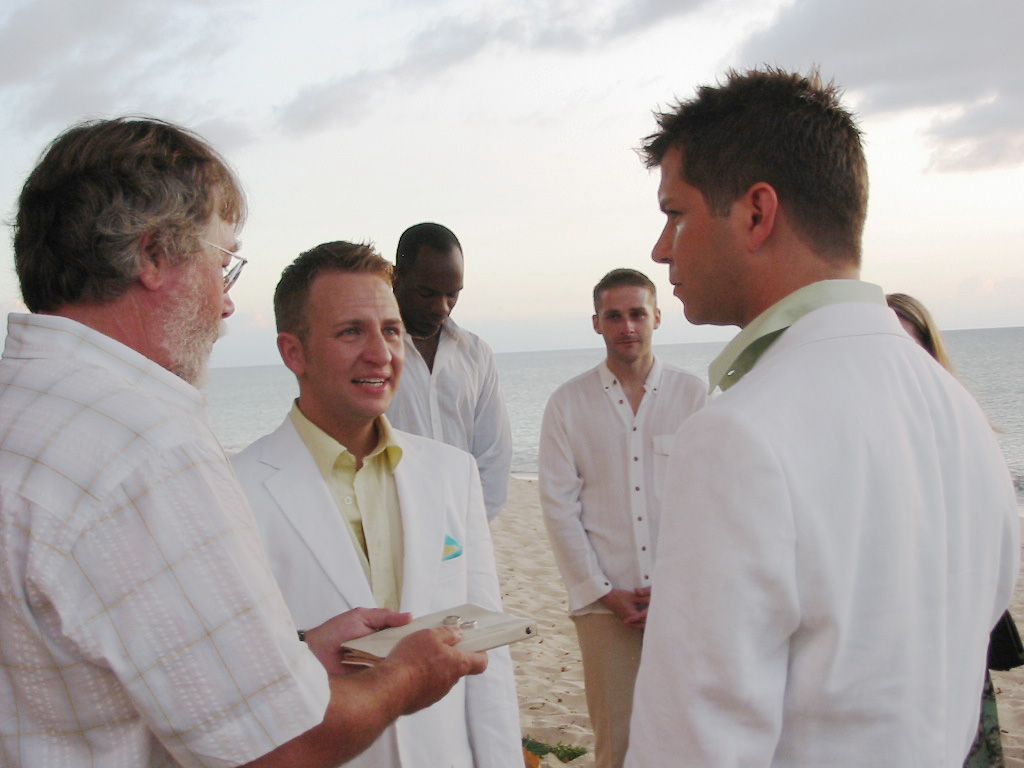
Marriage of two men celebrated by a Christian pastor in the United States.

The blessing or wedding of same-sex marriages and same-sex unions is an issue about which leaders of Christian churches are in ongoing disagreement. Traditionally, Christianity teaches that sexual practices between men and sexual practices between women are sinful and that holy matrimony can only exist between two persons of different sexes. These disagreements are primarily centred on the interpretation of various scripture passages related to homosexuality, sacred tradition, and in some churches on varying understandings of homosexuality in terms of psychology, genetics and other scientific data. While numerous church bodies have widely varying practices and teachings, individual Christians of every major tradition are involved in practical (orthopraxy) discussions about how to respond to the issue.

== History ==
In 1969, Pastor Troy Perry of the Metropolitan Community Church officiated at the wedding of two young men in Los Angeles. In 1974, the pastor of the United Church of Christ William R. Johnson and San Francisco State University professor Sally Miller Gearhart published the book Loving Women/Loving Men: Gay Liberation and the Church, which argued, among other things, that marriage is a covenant relationship, regardless of gender. Two years earlier, in 1972, the synod of the Reformed Churches in the Netherlands adopted a report that called same-sex relationships "essentially equivalent" to marriage.

As early as 1978, various theologians argued that the covenant and deep relationship between David and Jonathan would be a biblical basis for same-sex marriage.

In 1986, the Remonstrant Brotherhood (a small, liberal Protestant denomination in the Netherlands) decided to include the following article in its new church constitution, in place of a provision on the solemnization of marriage: "Two people who, in the presence of the Congregation or its representatives, promise to share their lives with one another in love and fidelity, may have a blessing pronounced upon the covenant thus entered into during a church service." From then on, the Remonstrants would no longer discriminate between marital and non-marital, opposite-sex and same-sex relationships. The first same-sex relationships were officially blessed in 1987. Unofficially, such blessings had been taking place in various Dutch (mainly Protestant) churches since the late 1960s, usually in a private church service.

In the context of the legalization of same-sex marriage in various countries and US states during the 2000s, and after national reflection, some Progressive Christian denominations then began to allow the blessing or same-sex marriage, usually leaving it to each local church to decide. After the legalization of same-sex marriage in the Netherlands in April 2001, the Mennonite Church in the Netherlands was one of the first to pass this resolution that same year. The Protestant Church in the Netherlands followed suit in 2004, but left the decision on whether or not to bless same-sex relationships to the local church councils. Similar resolutions have taken place on other continents, such as in the Evangelical Church of the River Plate in South America in 2010, in the Uniting Presbyterian Church in Southern Africa in 2015, in the Uniting Church in Australia in 2018.

== Theological views of those who support same-sex unions and/or marriages ==
Those Christians and churches which support blessing of same-sex unions and/or marriages do so from several perspectives:

- It is an affirmative good that stands alongside opposite-sex marriage and committed monastic celibacy as a revelation of God's self in the world.
- The logical coherence of the core Christian doctrines such as the Trinity, the Incarnation, the resurrection and the ascension is improved through the integration of same-sex marriage into the Christian conception of marriage.
- The understanding of marriage as a metaphor of Christ's relationship with the Church is strengthened by assimilating same-sex marriage into that metaphor.
- Some scholars maintain that scripture in the original languages contains no prohibition of homosexuality, but does record same-sex marriage. "But if we take a closer look, reading the scripture in the original Hebrew and Greek, we discover that God never condemned homosexuality, and that same-sex marriage existed in Bible times." "To tell a homosexual that the Bible is Good News, (but that) it says that their ability to love on a one-to-one basis (mate level) means they are sinful and perverted in God's eyes is a gross contradiction in terms. What's more, God is not saying this to gay people. God's Word is this: For God so loved the world that He gave His only begotten Son that whosoever believeth in Him should not perish, but have everlasting life. (John 3:16, KJV). And that is the Good News for modern gays."
- The Biblical references to homosexuality were uttered in the context of promiscuous same-sex practices of Hellenistic cultures (Paul) and cultures surrounding the people of Israel (Deut), especially when the interaction was between two people not of equal standing, and thus could be viewed as coercive and non-consensual. This kind of sex without love was often practiced by heterosexual men in lieu of going to female prostitutes. It is a discriminating misconception of our times to transfer that prohibition of such promiscuous practice without love to what we discuss here: durable, long-term, selective same-sex unions.

== Partial overview ==
=== Anglicanism ===
In 2004, the then archbishop of Canterbury, Rowan Williams, asked the Lambeth Commission on Communion to produce a report looking into the legal and theological implications flowing from decisions related to homosexuality that were apparently threatening the Anglican Communion, including decisions relating to the blessing of same-sex unions. Once published the Windsor Report led to the calling by the Lambeth Commission for a moratorium on the blessing of same-sex unions, and recommended that bishops who have authorised such rites in the United States and Canada "be invited to express regret that the proper constraints of the bonds of affection were breached by such authorisation." The report was roundly condemned by supporters of the gay and lesbian community, as well as by a number of theologians for its partiality. To date, "the more liberal provinces that are open to changing Church doctrine on marriage in order to allow same-sex unions include Brazil, Canada, New Zealand, Scotland, South India, South Africa, the US and Wales".

==== Anglican Church of Canada ====
The General Synod of the Anglican Church of Canada in 2004 voted to defer a decision of same-sex blessings until 2007, but also to "Affirm the integrity and sanctity of committed adult same-sex relationships". In 2007, a resolution enabling diocesan bishops to authorize the blessing of same-gender unions narrowly failed, but a statement adopted by General Synod in 2010 "acknowledge[d] diverse pastoral practices as dioceses respond to their own missional contexts," effectively devolving decisions about blessings to local dioceses.

The Anglican Church of Canada does not distinguish theologically between a marriage solemnized in church and a civil marriage subsequently blessed by a priest. Currently, three dioceses – New Westminster, Niagara, and Montréal – extend the blessing of civil marriages to same-sex couples. Procedures for blessings are in development in Ottawa and Toronto. In 2010 the General Synod of the Anglican Church of Canada voted to study a proposal to bless only those marriages that have been civilly registered, even where marriage is reserved to heterosexual couples, abrogating the role of clergy as delegates of the provincial registrar altogether.

The blessing of same-sex unions became a subject of media attention in the Vancouver area in May, 2003 when Bishop Michael Ingham of the Anglican Diocese of New Westminster announced that he had given priests in some parishes the authority to bless gay and lesbian unions. Bishop Ingham issued a rite of blessing of people in committed same-sex unions on May 23, 2003. This was done in response to requests by three consecutive Diocesan Synods, culminating in June, 2002. The diocese considers that the blessing of same-sex couples is one part of their work of community outreach and care for parishioners. The blessing is a way that some priests use to ensure that homosexual people who seek to be included in the Anglican Communion feel safe and respected. The blessing is a "pastoral tool". Some priests in some parishes (six out of 80) bless permanent faithful relationships. Permission is granted by the bishop only when a priest requests it, and a parish has decided by majority vote, that they want to be a place of blessing. Ingham says of the practice: I insist only that those on all sides of the issue respect one another and that everyone should maintain the order of the church. Our goal in the Anglican Church in the Greater Vancouver area is to be a church that accommodates differences.

In 2009, the Anglican Diocese of Niagara in southwestern Ontario became the second diocese to authorize the blessing of same-sex unions when Bishop Michael Bird approved a gender-neutral rite for the blessing of civil marriages. The rite was permitted for use in consultation with the diocesan bishop beginning September 1, 2009.

In 2009, the Bishop of the Anglican Diocese of Ottawa authorized the blessing of same-sex unions in a single parish: the Church of St John the Evangelist. Rather than issuing a specific rite, Bishop Chapman authorized an existing rite already in use for the blessing of civil marriages between opposite-sex couples.

In 2010, Barry Clarke, Bishop of the Anglican Diocese of Montreal, authorized the blessing of same-sex unions. He issued a rite and guidelines to permit the blessing of civil marriages regardless of the gender of the spouses. The rite had been adapted from an existing rite already in use for the blessing of civil marriages between opposite-sex couples.

A limited number of parishes in the Anglican Diocese of Toronto have been authorized to bless same-sex unions. Rather than crafting a specific rite of blessing, the Archbishop of Toronto issued guidelines setting rules and restrictions on blessings. Blessings must not resemble too closely a marriage rite, with the specific proviso that no form of blessing used for marriage in the official rites of the Anglican Church of Canada or other parts of the Anglican Communion may be used with same-sex couples.

On July 12, 2016, the General Synod voted in favour of same-sex marriage. The Dioceses of Ottawa and Niagara, which already provide blessing rites, have announced that they will begin allowing same-sex marriages. In 2019, the second reading to change the marriage canon to include same-sex marriage failed to pass when it did not receive a 2/3 majority in the House of Bishops despite receiving the necessary votes among the Clergy and the Laity. However, the General Synod did vote in favor of a document, "A Word to the Church", which allows diocese to bless same-sex unions and which clarifies that "the existing canon does not prohibit same-sex marriage." Therefore, the Anglican Church of Canada has affirmed that there is a local option to allow same-sex marriages in church.

==== Episcopal Church in the USA ====
At its triennial General Convention in 1976, the Episcopal Church took the first step toward acknowledging homosexual persons' claim to the Church's pastoral concern and care. Thirty-nine years later, at its 2015 General Convention as recounted below, the Church would establish marriage equality for Episcopalians desiring to enter into same-sex unions.

1976. The 1976 General Convention resolved "that it is the sense of this General Convention that homosexual persons are children of God who have a full and equal claim with all other persons upon the love, acceptance, and pastoral concern and care of the Church."

2006. At its 2006 General Convention, the Episcopal Church rejected a resolution allowing the solemnization of same-sex marriages in Massachusetts, where same-sex marriage is recognized by civil law. However, the 2006 General Convention adopted a resolution under the title "Reaffirm Church Membership of Gay and Lesbian Persons." The resolution was in four parts:

- It reaffirmed "that gay and lesbian persons are by Baptism full members of the Body of Christ and of The Episcopal Church as 'children of God who have a full and equal claim with all other persons upon the love, acceptance, and pastoral concern and care of the Church.' "
- It apologized "on behalf of The Episcopal Church to its members who are gay or lesbian, and to lesbians and gay men outside the Church, for years of rejection and maltreatment by the Church," and recommit to "seek amendment of our life together as we ask God's help in sharing the Good News with all people."
- It pledged "to include openly gay and lesbian persons on every committee, commission or task force developed for the specific purpose of discussing issues about sexuality and request the same of our sister churches in the Anglican Communion and Anglican Communion bodies."
- Regarding membership in the Anglican Communion, it reiterated that "our baptism into Jesus Christ is inseparable from our communion with one another, and we commit ourselves to that communion despite our diversity of opinion and, among dioceses, a diversity of pastoral practice with the gay men and lesbians among us."

2009. In July 2009, the General Convention adopted a resolution allowing individual bishops to choose whether or not to allow the blessing of same-sex unions within their dioceses. The resolution was seen as a compromise between those who call for an official rite for the blessing of same-sex unions, and those who oppose any recognition of such unions. However, the resolution also left the door open for the creation of such an official rite in the future, calling on bishops to "collect and develop theological and liturgical resources" for possible use for such a purpose at the 2012 General Convention.

2012. On July 9, 2012, the Episcopal Church passed a resolution approving an official liturgy for blessing same-sex unions. This liturgy, called "The Witnessing and Blessing of a Lifelong Covenant" offers a blessing close to marriage, but the church is clear that it is not marriage. According to Rev. Ruth Meyers, chairwoman of the Standing Commission on Liturgy and Music, "There are a lot of similarities. The couple give their consent to being joined in lifelong commitment, they exchange vows. There's the possibility of exchanging rings, or, for couples who have been together for some time and already have rings, to have their rings blessed. There is a blessing over the couple. But we're clear at this point that this is not a marriage because the Episcopal Church is not in agreement in its understanding of marriage." The resolution enables priests to bestow the church's blessing on gay couples even if they live in a state where same-sex marriage is illegal; however, bishops who do not approve of the liturgy can prohibit their priests from using it. The resolution is provisional and will be reviewed in three years.

As of September 1, 2012, clergy of the Episcopal Diocese of New York have been authorized to officiate at same-sex weddings.

2015. As the Episcopal News Service reported on the 2015 Seventy-eighth General Convention, "in the wake of the June 26 U.S. Supreme Court ruling legalizing same-sex marriage for all Americans, General Convention followed suit on July 1 with canonical and liturgical changes to provide marriage equality for Episcopalians." A canonical change eliminated "language defining marriage as between a man and a woman" and "two new marriage rites with language allowing them to be used by same-sex or opposite-sex couples." These new marriage rites are to be used "under the discretion and with the permission of the diocesan bishop." Also, "clergy retain the canonical right to refuse to officiate at any wedding."

The two new marriage rites have been made available online without charge by the Church Publishing House. "The Witnessing and Blessing of a Marriage" (Church Publishing House, 2015) and "The Celebration and Blessing of a Marriage 2" (Church Publishing House, 2015)

The General Convention also approved The Witnessing and Blessing of a Lifelong Covenant: Liturgical Resources for Blessing Same-Sex Relationships for "continued use".

==== England ====
The Church of England's approach to same-sex relationships is currently defined (in a de facto sense) by Issues in Human Sexuality: a statement issued in 1991 by the House of Bishops 'to which all clergy currently are asked to assent'. In 2023 it was stated that this document would be replaced by new 'pastoral guidance'.

In 2016, the Archbishops' Council of the Church of England confirmed the following:

- clergy in the Church of England are allowed to enter in same-gender civil partnerships;
- clergy are able to offer prayers in support of same-gender couples;
- churches are able to publicly welcome LGBT people;
- clergy and lay people are allowed to make arguments in favour of changing church doctrine.

In 2017, the Church of England's Diocese of Hereford voted in favour of a motion calling on the church "to create a set of formal services and prayers to bless those who have had a same-sex marriage or civil partnership." At General Synod in 2019, the Church of England announced that same-gender couples may remain and be recognized as married after a spouse has experienced gender transition provided that the spouses identified as opposite genders at the time of the marriage.

In January 2023, following a six-year period of discernment, the House of Bishops announced that it was proposing to 'offer the fullest possible pastoral provision without changing the Church's doctrine of Holy Matrimony for same-sex couples through a range of draft prayers, [...] which could be used voluntarily in churches for couples who have marked a significant stage of their relationship such as a civil marriage or civil partnership'. The draft prayers were introduced and debated at General Synod the following month.

On 12 December 2023 the House of Bishops published Prayers of Love and Faith, 'a selection of readings and prayers of thanksgiving, dedication and asking for God's blessing for same-sex couples', having approved the final version that morning, and commended them 'for use in regular public worship or private prayer'; at the same time they published 'pastoral guidance' setting out how the prayers can be used. They are commended for use during regular church services (such as a Sunday Eucharist or Sunday Evensong); the holding of separate 'standalone' services is not currently envisaged (on the basis that, while prayers can be 'commended' for use by the House of Bishops, standalone services would need more formal 'authorisation' by General Synod under canon law). The first formally approved blessings taking place during regular church services began on December 18, 2023.

In November 2023, however, the General Synod of the Church of England had accepted an amendment 'calling on the bishops to consider whether standalone services for same-sex couples could be made available for use, possibly on a trial basis'; as of December 2023 this remains under discussion by the House of Bishops. In July 2024, the General Synod voted to support moving forward with "stand-alone" services of blessing, on a trial basis, for same-sex couples following a civil partnership or civil marriage.

==== Ireland ====
The Church of Ireland has facilitated a number of conversations about the subject of homosexuality. In 2002, a vicar celebrated a blessing service for a same-sex couple. In 2008, "the Church of Ireland Pensions Board ha[d] confirmed that it will treat civil partners the same as spouses." In 2011, a senior minister within the church entered into a same-sex civil partnership becoming the first to do so. The Clergy Pension Fund recognized that "the pension entitlement of a member's registered civil partner will be the same as that of a surviving spouse..." A Church of Ireland report states that "the moral logic underpinning the negative portrayal of same-sex eroticism in Scripture does not directly address committed, loving, consecrated same-sex relationships today". Currently, the church recognizes four main viewpoints ranging from opposition of same-sex unions to full acceptance of same-sex marriage. "The CoI General Synod considered blessing same-sex relationships in 2017, however it was rejected – in a relatively narrow vote." In 2022, two bishops in the Church of Ireland declared their support for the blessing of same-sex unions. Three dioceses, the United Diocese of Tuam, Limerick, and Killaloe, the Diocese of Dublin and Glendalough, and the Diocese of Cashel, Ferns, and Ossory have voted to support the blessing of civil same-sex marriages, requesting that a motion be considered by the General Synod.

==== Scotland ====
In 2015, the General Synod of the Scottish Episcopal Church passed an initial vote which could eventually lead to the formal blessing of same-sex unions. Following that vote, St. Paul's Cathedral in Dundee held a special ceremony which, for the first time, blessed the union of a same-sex couple who had already been married in Dundee's registry office. In 2016, the church general synod voted to amend the marriage canon to include same-sex couples, and on 8 June 2017 it voted to allow same-sex weddings in Scottish Episcopal churches.

On 1 August 2017, an American couple with Scottish connections were married, in "a small intimate occasion" just outside Edinburgh, which included the Eucharist as a nuptial mass, presided over by the Rector of St John's Episcopal Church, Edinburgh, making it the first Anglican same-sex wedding in the British Isles. On 16 September 2017, two men married inside St John's Episcopal Church, Edinburgh, also preside over by the Rector of St John's, making it the first same-sex marriage inside an Anglican church in the British Isles.

==== Wales ====
Civil partnerships have been permitted for clergy since 2005. Regarding such civil unions, "The Church in Wales has no formal view on whether people in civil partnerships who are in a sexual relationship can serve as clergy. If the issue arises, it is up to the relevant Bishop to decide." The Welsh Church does not require abstinence within civil unions.

In 2015, the Church in Wales discussed same-sex marriages and "more than half of its Governing Body voted in favour of [same-sex marriage]". However, due to the need for a 2/3 majority to amend the marriage canon, the Bench of Bishops decided to approve "a series of prayers which may be said with a couple following the celebration of a civil partnership or civil marriage". The prayers, in Form One, give thanks "for [the partners] who have found such love and companionship in each other, that it has led them to dedicate their lives in support of one another."

On 7 September 2021 in an historic vote the Church in Wales allowed blessings for same-sex marriages. The first such blessing took place at St Collen's Church, Llangollen, Denbighshire in November 2021.

==== Australia ====
For some years, the Anglican Church of Australia has debated the blessing of same-sex marriages. Currently, the church has no official position on homosexuality. However, due to the church's position on marriage, the Primate and Archbishop of Melbourne, Philip Freier, stated in an ad clerum that clergy cannot perform a same-sex marriage and that "clergy are required to ask their episcopate bishop for guidance as to how to act in specific pastoral circumstances concerning same-sex weddings and celebrations". The Diocese of Wangaratta has voted to bless same-sex civil unions. In 2013, the Diocese of Perth voted in favour of recognising same-sex relationships. The Diocese of Gippsland has appointed an openly gay priest to serve within its parishes. St. Andrew's Church in Subiaco, Perth has blessed a same-sex union. In 2018, Peter McLeod-Miller, an archdeacon, "conducted an unofficial hand-clasping ceremony at [a same-sex wedding]." In 2020, the Appellate Tribunal, the highest church court for the denomination, ruled that a diocese may allow the blessing of same-sex civil marriages.

==== Anglican Church in Aotearoa, New Zealand and Polynesia ====
In 2014, the general synod of the Anglican Church in Aotearoa, New Zealand and Polynesia passed a resolution that will create a pathway towards the blessing of same-sex relationships. In the meantime, while blessing rites are being developed, "clergy should be permitted 'to recognise in public worship' a same-gender civil union or state marriage of members of their faith community."

In the Auckland Diocese, there are congregations that may offer a "relationship blessing" for two partners. In 2005, a same-sex couple was joined in a civil union at St. Matthew in the City in the Auckland diocese. The Dunedin diocese also provides a blessing for the relationship of "two people" irrespective of gender. In the Waiapu Diocese the bishop's chaplain has also performed a blessing for a same-sex couple. In May 2018 the general synod of the Anglican Church allowed blessing of same-sex marriages.

==== Anglican Church of Southern Africa ====
Some churches in Africa, "where homosexuals can be legally ordained", "are joining the trend, including the Anglican church in South Africa formerly led by Archbishop Desmond Tutu". The denomination also has no official position on homosexuality. At the same time, in 2016, "Anglican bishops from across southern Africa have resolved that gay and lesbian partners who enter same-sex civil unions under South African law should be welcomed into congregations as full members of the church". In 2016, the Diocese of Saldanha Bay proposed a motion for the "blessing of same-sex civil unions..." While the 2016 motion did not pass, the Diocese of Cape Town tabled a motion urging the bishops "to finalise guidelines on how its leaders should respond to same-sex partnerships of a 'faithful commitment,'..." Archbishop Thabo Makgoba set up, in 2017, a working committee "… to amend Canon 34 which will enable ministry to those in Same Sex Unions and the LGBTI Community in the context in which ACSA operates in Southern Africa."

Priests in Saldanha Bay have stated that they will unofficially bless same-sex unions. The Diocese of Pretoria joined Saldanha Bay in supporting same-sex relationships. Much earlier, in 2009, the Cape Town synod voted to "provide pastoral care to gay and lesbian members in 'faithful, committed' same-sex partnerships." In 2018, the Diocese of Saldanha Bay became the first diocese in the Anglican Church of Southern Africa to officially vote for the blessing of same-sex civil unions. In 2023, the Synod of Bishops agreed to develop prayers that may be said with same-sex couples, but they did not approve of blessings or marriage for same-sex couples. In 2024, Archbishop Thabo Makgoba published the draft prayers to be said with same-sex couples for study by the dioceses. The drafted prayers include both blessings for same-sex couples as well as prayers acknowledging disagreement with same-sex relationships. The Provincial Synod of 2024 did not approve the drafts for official use. Following the synod, Raphael Hess, the Bishop of the Diocese of Saldanha Bay, gave permission for priests in the diocese to bless same-sex couples.

==== Episcopal Anglican Church of Brazil ====
The Episcopal Anglican Church of Brazil permits the ordination of gay and lesbian priests and the blessing of same-sex relationships. In 2016, an Extraordinary Synod drafted a proposal for the General Synod of 2017 to amend the marriage canon to include same-sex marriage. On 1 June 2018 the General Synod voted to change the marriage canon to allow same-sex couples to get married.

==== Old Catholic, Reformed Catholic Churches and Liberal Catholic Church ====
Five churches of the Union of Utrecht, which shares full communion with the Anglican Churches through the Bonn Agreement, also permit such blessings: namely, Old Catholic Church of the Netherlands (the mother church) permits blessings of gay civil marriages, and the Christian Catholic Church of Switzerland, and Catholic Diocese of the Old Catholics in Germany permit blessings of homosexual civil unions. The Old Catholic Church of Austria also permits such blessings. Because of this (as well as the ordination of women), the Polish National Catholic Church seceded from the Union in 2003.

Many smaller denominations, such as the Eucharistic Catholic Church, the Old Catholic Church (in Sweden) and TOCCUSA also solemnize same-sex marriages.

The Old Catholic Church, Province of the United States (TOCCUSA) is a Catholic denomination founded on the ecclesiology of the Old Catholics of the Union of Utrecht. Old Catholics are progressive when it comes to social issues, yet maintain the rich tradition of the sacramental nature of the Catholic Church. All seven sacraments of the Church are open to any baptized Catholic Christian. For TOCCUSA, the sacramental nature of same-sex marriages is recognized, thus ensuring that there is no distinction between the marriages of two persons of the same gender or two persons of opposite genders. Couples wishing to marry must undergo some pre-marital counseling before the marriage rite takes place.

In October 2022, the Old Catholic Church of the Czech Republic voted to allow its priests to bless same-sex partnerships.

=== Presbyterian polities ===
==== Church of Scotland ====
The 2006 General Assembly of the Church of Scotland voted that blessing civil partnerships should be a matter of conscience for individual ministers. Conservatives in the Kirk argued that the reform would have to be ratified by local presbyteries under the Barrier Act. When the 45 Presbyteries were consulted, only nine voted in favour of allowing ministers to bless civil-partnered (same-sex) couples, and the remaining 36 were against the innovation. Therefore, it was defeated, and is due to be addressed again at the 2013 General Assembly. At its 2011 General Assembly, the Church of Scotland voted to allow openly gay and lesbian Ministers and Diaconal ministers who live in civil unions, provided that they were already ordained and had declared their sexuality before the Scott Rennie case on 23 May 2009. There remains, however, a Moratorium on accepting those in same-sex relationships for training, ordination or induction into the Ministry or Diaconate, which may be lifted by the General Assembly of 2013. When asked to respond to the Scottish Government's consultation on same-sex marriage, the Church's Legal Questions Committee submitted a response which upheld a biblical and traditional understanding of marriage as a voluntary lifelong union between one man and one woman (December 2011). After this, the Church's first openly gay minister, Revd. Scott Rennie, claimed to the press that such ostracisation of homosexuals will empty churches.

In 2016, the General Assembly voted in favor of allowing ministers to enter into same-sex marriages. On 25 May 2017, the General Assembly voted in favor of allowing same-sex marriages in Church of Scotland. In May 2018, the General Assembly passed a vote by 345 to 170, for a motion which tasked a committee with drafting church law on the issue of same-sex marriage. Its Legal Questions Committee has been asked to report back to the decision-making body in 2020. In May 2022 the General Assembly approved the celebration of same-sex marriage in the Church of Scotland.

==== Presbyterian Church in Ireland ====
In May 2006, a church spokesperson announced that clergy could bless same-gender partnerships. However, that announcement was reversed by General Assembly when it voted to ban its ministers from blessing same-gender partnerships in June 2006. The Presbyterian Church in Ireland is currently strongly opposed to same-sex marriage.

==== Presbyterian Church (USA) ====
The Presbyterian Church USA General Assembly Permanent Judicial Commission ruled in 2006 that same-sex ceremonies are not forbidden, as long as they are not considered to be the same as marriage services. Debate on the issue within the church evolved over the years. In 2000, the General Assembly had approved language for the church constitution that stated church teachings were that people were "to live either in fidelity within the covenant of marriage between a man and a woman or in chastity in singleness," and barred church officers and property from being used for blessing or approval upon any other form of fidelity relationship, but ratification for this language was never obtained by the presbyteries. By 2014, the General Assembly passed an Authoritative Interpretation permitting pastors to sign marriage licences for same-gender couples where permitted by civil law in the states where their church was found, which took immediate effect.

On March 17, 2015, ratification by a majority of presbyteries was reached on a constitutional amendment passed by that same 2014 General Assembly, which broadened the definition of marriage in the Directory for Worship from only being between "a man and a woman", to "two people, traditionally a man and a woman", thus giving official sanction to, while not making it mandatory for, any congregation's pastor to preside over and bless marriage ceremonies for same-gender couples.

=== Connexional polities ===
==== Methodism ====
There are a variety of responses within Methodism some of which have been favorable to a greater or lesser extent to same-sex unions or marriages.

===== Methodist Church of Great Britain =====
In 2005, the Methodist Church of Great Britain voted to allow a local option for ministers who wish to perform same-sex blessings, with a Church spokesperson stating that "We have decided, with the law changing in December, we as a Church need to provide guidance to our ministers, who will be allowed to take an individual decision as to whether or not they want to bless gay couples." In 2006, the Church reversed its decision and prohibited the blessing of same-sex unions on or off church property.

In 2014, the church allowed ministers to enter into same-sex marriages and to offer blessing services for same-sex couples in civil marriages. In 2021, the Methodist Church's conference overwhelmingly voted to allow the marriage of same-sex couples in Methodist churches and by Methodist ministers. Methodists may affirm one of two parallel definitions of marriage: "only between a man and a woman" or "between any two people". No minister shall be compelled to perform same-sex marriages.

===== United Methodist Church =====
On May 3, 2024, the General Conference of the United Methodist Church voted to remove prohibitions against same-sex marriages, allowing congregations and clergy to celebrate same-sex marriages. The vote does not require clergy to perform same-sex marriages, but gives clergy the option to perform same-sex weddings if they choose to do so. On May 7, 2018, the Bishops in the UMC, a denomination long divided on questions of LGBT equality, had proposed allowing individual pastors and regional church bodies to decide whether to ordain LGBT clergy and perform same-sex weddings. The United Methodist Church previously prohibited celebrations of same-sex unions by its elders and in its churches. The church had already approved of spousal benefits for non-ordained employees in same-sex marriages in states that allow such marriages.

Prior to the repeal of the prohibitions, some Jurisdictions and Annual Conferences had begun to ordain gay and lesbian pastors and same-sex marriages or have passed resolutions supporting such ceremonies. The Baltimore-Washington, California-Nevada, California-Pacific, Desert Southwest, Detroit, Greater New Jersey, Great Plains, Illinois Great Rivers, Iowa, Minnesota, New England, New York, Northern Illinois, Oregon-Idaho, Pacific Northwest, Rocky Mountain, Southwest Texas, Upper New York, Virginia, West Michigan, and Wisconsin Annual Conferences have passed resolutions supporting same-sex couples or the ordination of gay and lesbian clergy.

In 2016, the New York Annual Conference ordained the denomination's first openly gay and lesbian clergy. Following those ordinations, the Western Jurisdiction elected and consecrated the church's first openly gay and partnered bishop., for example Karen Oliveto and Cedrick Bridgeforth.

===== African Methodist Episcopal Church =====
The African Methodist Episcopal Church, which is in full communion with the UMC, currently prohibits its ministers from officiating same-sex weddings, but it does not have an official policy on gay pastors and, therefore, gay ministers have been ordained in the AME.

===== Evangelical Methodist Church in Argentina =====
The Evangelical Methodist Church in Argentina allows "the freedom to accompany homosexual couples" in ministry. Each congregation is, therefore, free to determine its own policy.

===== Evangelical Methodist Church in Uruguay =====
The Evangelical Church in Uruguay, a Methodist denomination, has "resolved that pastors that wish to minister to homosexuals may do so freely". Each pastor is free to provide blessing services for same-sex unions if he or she chooses to do so.

===== Methodist Church of New Zealand =====
In 2004, the Methodist Church of New Zealand approved the ordination of gay and lesbian clergy; each congregation is able to determine its own position on the issue.

===== Evangelisch-methodistische Kirche, the United Methodist Church in Germany =====
In November 2022, the Evangelisch-methodistische Kirche in Germany allowed blessing ceremonies for same-sex marriages.

=== Congregational polities ===
==== Baptist Churches ====
Some Baptist denominations in the United States do not have official beliefs about marriage in a confession of faith and invoke congregationalism to leave the choice to each church to decide. This is the case of American Baptist Churches USA, Progressive National Baptist Convention, Cooperative Baptist Fellowship and National Baptist Convention, USA. Most denominations however remain conservative, believing in what they describe as 'traditional' marriage between one man and one woman.

Some Baptist associations support blessings of same-sex marriage, such as the Alliance of Baptists (USA), the Baptist Peace Fellowship of North America (USA), the Canadian Association for Baptist Freedoms, the Aliança de Batistas do Brasil, the Fraternidad de Iglesias Bautistas de Cuba, the Open Baptists Association (Australia) and the Association of Welcoming and Affirming Baptists (international).

==== Quakers ====
The first recorded same-sex marriage by a Quaker meeting in the US was in 1987. In January, 1987, Morningside Monthly Meeting of the Society of Friends, in the Morningside Heights neighborhood of New York City, became the first Quaker Meeting to treat same-sex marriage and opposite-sex marriage equally, and the first to take a same-sex marriage (using the word marriage, rather than "commitment ceremony") on May 30, 1987.

Same-sex couples have been married under the care of many "unprogrammed" Quaker meetings in Canada since 1992. In Australia, Canberra Quaker meeting celebrated the marriage of two gay men on 15 April 2007. Australian Quakers are prepared to celebrate same-sex marriages despite the lack of legal recognition. See Quaker views of homosexuality

In 2009, the Yearly Meeting of the Religious Society of Friends (Quakers) in Great Britain, the Channel Islands and the Isle of Man decided to authorise same-sex marriage, having previously performed blessings for same-sex civil partnerships. In Australia, the 2010 Yearly Meeting called on the Federal Government to amend the Australian Marriage Act to give full and equal legal recognition to all marriages, regardless of the sexual orientation and gender of the partners. Australian Quakers had been blessing same-sex unions since 1994. The Canada Yearly Meeting stated in 2003 that Canadian Quakers "support the right of same-sex couples to a civil marriage and the extension of the legal definition of marriage to include same-sex couples." Since then a number of same-sex marriages have been performed at Canadian Monthly Meetings. In New Zealand, the Aotearoa Quaker Meeting in 1995 pledged "to seek formal ways of recognizing a variety of commitments, including gay and lesbian partnerships."

==== United Church of Christ ====
Varies by church. The General Synod of the United Church of Christ has passed a resolution affirming "equal marriage rights for couples regardless of gender and declares that the government should not interfere with couples regardless of gender who choose to marry and share fully and equally in the rights, responsibilities and commitment of legally recognized marriage". At its 25th General Synod in 2005, the UCC passed the resolution, "Equal Marriage Rights for All". However, the polity of the UCC is congregationalist, so of each church has a different way of operating. (The General Synod does not have authority over Local Churches to determine or enforce denominational doctrine)

==== Canadian Unitarian Council ====
Canadian Unitarian churches perform same-sex marriage as well.

==== Unitarian Universalist Association ====
Unitarian Universalists perform same-sex marriages, and have supported marriage equality since 1973, reaffirming with a formal resolution in 1996.

==== Metropolitan Community Church ====
The predominantly gay Universal Fellowship of Metropolitan Community Churches performs same-sex marriages.

==== Mennonite Church ====
The Mennonite Church in the Netherlands offers marriage to both heterosexual and same-gender couples.

The Mennonite Church Canada offers marriage to both heterosexual and same-gender couples.

==== Remonstrants ====
Since 1986, Remonstrants have treated marital and non-marital, opposite-sex and same-sex relationships on an equal footing.

==== Pentecostalism ====
Most Pentecostal churches do not affirm gay marriage.

The Affirming Pentecostal Church International and the Global Alliance of Affirming Apostolic Pentecostals are US based denominations of Oneness Pentecostals that will perform weddings for both heterosexual and same-sex couples.

==== Christian Church (Disciples of Christ) ====
In mainline Christian Church (Disciples of Christ) blessing of same-sex unions are allowed.

=== Mixed-polity and other polity ===
==== Moravian Church (North America) ====
The Moravian Church in North America's Northern Province has passed several liberal resolutions on homosexuality, but has not yet been able to "address the issue of a marriage covenant between homosexual persons".

==== Swedenborgianism ====
The Swedenborgian Church of North America allows ministers to choose whether to perform same-sex marriages. Ministers of the General Church of the New Jerusalem are not permitted to marry or bless same-sex unions.

==== New Apostolic Church ====
Since 2011 in Europe the New Apostolic Church allows blessings in a prayer for same-sex unions.

==== Uniting and united churches ====
===== Australia =====
In Australia the Uniting Church in Australia allows blessing of same-sex unions. On 13 July 2018, the Uniting Church in Australia voted by national Assembly to approve the creation of official marriage rites for same-sex couples.

===== Netherlands =====
Whereas Ord[inance] 5-3 of the church order of the Protestant Church in the Netherlands—the country's largest Protestant denomination—reserves the expression 'marriage' for opposite-sex couples ("The blessing of a marriage between a man and a woman as a covenant of love and fidelity before God takes place during a church service."), Ord. 5-4 adds: "The [local] church council may—after consultation with the congregation—decide that other life partnerships between two people may also be blessed as a covenant of love and fidelity before God." The latter wording is consistent with the provision in the ecclesiastical ordinances adopted by the Remonstrant Brotherhood in 1986. Unlike the Remonstrants, however, the Protestant Church in the Netherlands symbolically maintains the privileged status of heterosexual marriage.

===== Canada =====
Due to its "local option", a number of congregations and ministers of the United Church of Canada (a merger of Congregationalist, Presbyterian and Methodist congregations in Canada following presbyterian polity) officiate at same-sex marriages, which are fully legal in Canada.

===== United Kingdom =====
In 2012, the United Reformed Church allowed blessings of same-sex couples. In July 2016, the United Reformed Church allowed same-sex marriage.

===== France =====
In France, the two main Protestant churches (United Protestant Church of France since 2015 and the Union of Protestant Churches of Alsace and Lorraine in 2019) both allow the willing parishes to bless same-sex marriages.

=== Other denominations around the world ===
==== Austria ====
- Evangelical Church in Austria
- Evangelical Lutheran Free Church
- Reformed Church in Austria (since 1998/since 2019 blessing of marriages)

==== Belgium ====
- United Protestant Church in Belgium

==== Canada ====
The Evangelical Lutheran Church in Canada has permitted the blessing of same-sex unions since July 2011. The Lutheran Church–Canada does not permit the blessing of same-sex unions. The LC-C stance is consonant with that of its American sister church, the Lutheran Church–Missouri Synod.

The governing council of The United Church of Canada welcomes same-sex marriage, but individual United Church congregations are responsible for making decisions locally. Marriages are performed with the permission and under the responsibility of the local congregation.

==== Czech Republic ====
The Evangelical Church of Czech Brethren has permitted the blessing of same-sex unions since May 2023. The Czechoslovak Hussite Church has permitted the blessing of same-sex unions.

==== Denmark ====
In November 2011, the Government of Denmark announced that there will be same-sex religious marriage available in the Church of Denmark as part of the broader legislative move to recognise same-sex marriage. A similar debate is currently underway in the Church of Iceland following legislation to permit same-sex marriage in Iceland.

The Church of Denmark (in full communion with the Anglican Churches of the British Isles through the Porvoo Communion) now performs blessings of same-sex couples.

==== Finland ====
In the Evangelical Lutheran Church of Finland, church law defines marriage as a union between one man and one woman. However, there are special prayers for same-sex couples following a civil union or marriage. The archbishop supports these prayers and has "called for the church to take a clear and unequivocal stance in support of gay and lesbian couples". Some bishops are willing to ordain gay and lesbian pastors.

==== France ====
The United Protestant Church of France performs blessings of same-sex marriages. The Union of Protestant Churches of Alsace and Lorraine allowed blessings of same-sex marriages in November 2019.

==== Luxembourg ====
Both the Protestant Reformed Church of Luxembourg and the Protestant Church of Luxembourg allow the blessing of same-sex marriages.

==== Germany ====
All 20 Lutheran, United and Reformed churches within the Evangelical Church in Germany perform blessings of same-sex marriages. On November 9, 2019, Union of Evangelical Churches allowed blessing of same-sex marriages.

- Protestant Church in Hesse and Nassau
- Protestant Church of Bremen
- Protestant Lutheran State Church of Brunswick
- Evangelical Lutheran Church of Hanover
- Evangelical Lutheran Church in Northern Germany
  - former North Elbian Evangelical Church
- Evangelical Lutheran Church in Oldenburg
- Evangelical Church of Berlin-Brandenburg-Silesian Upper Lusatia
- Protestant Church of Westphalia
- Protestant Church of the Palatinate
- Evangelical Church in the Rhineland
- Evangelical Church in Central Germany
- Evangelical Church of Hesse Electorate-Waldeck
- Evangelical Reformed Church in Bavaria and Northwestern Germany
- Church of Lippe
- Evangelical Church of Anhalt
- Protestant Church in Baden
- Evangelical-Lutheran Church of Saxony
- Evangelical Lutheran Church in Bavaria
- Evangelical-Lutheran Church in Württemberg
- Evangelical Lutheran Church of Schaumburg-Lippe

==== Iceland ====
Within the Church of Iceland, the blessing of same-sex couples is allowed.

==== Italy ====
The Waldensian Evangelical Church became the first Italian Christian denomination to bless same-sex couples.

The Lutheran Evangelical Church in Italy supports same-sex couples and allowed blessings of same-sex unions in 2011.

==== Norway ====
In 2013, the Church of Norway allowed blessing of same-sex unions. In a synod-meeting on the 11th of April 2016 the Church of Norway formally allowed same-sex marriages in their churches and announced the commencement of work on a liturgy for same-sex marriages.

==== Philippines ====
The Metropolitan Community Church of Quezon City (MCCQC), Metropolitan Community Church Makati (MCCMPH), and Metropolitan Community Church of Metro Baguio (MCCMB) officiate Holy Unions for same-sex partners in the Philippines. The Metropolitan Community Church is an Ecumenical Christian Church for all people, with a special ministry to gays, lesbians, bisexuals and transgender people; it advocates for equality and social justice. Its affiliations in The Philippines are the following: MCC Quezon City, MCC Makati, MCC Metro Baguio, MCC Olongapo, and MCC Marikina.

==== Poland ====
In May 2024, clergy from the Evangelical Reformed Church in Poland and Halina Radacz, a pastor in the Evangelical Church of the Augsburg Confession Poland, offered the first documented blessings of same-sex couples in Poland.

==== Sweden ====
The Church of Sweden performs blessings of same-sex couples. Following the legalization of same-sex marriage in Sweden in May 2009, the Church of Sweden decided in October 2009 to start conducting same-sex weddings in their churches. It had previously blessed same-sex couples using a different ceremony.

==== Reformed churches in Switzerland ====
Most of the reformed churches in Federation of Swiss Protestant Churches perform blessings for same-sex couples, for example

- Reformed Church of Aargau
- Reformed Churches of the Canton Bern-Jura-Solothurn
- Evangelical-Reformed Church of Graubünden
- Evangelical Reformed Church of the Canton of Lucerne
- Evangelical Reformed Church of the Canton of St. Gallen
- Evangelical Reformed Church of the Canton of Schaffhausen
- Chiesa evangelica riformata nel Ticino
- Evangelical Church of the Canton of Thurgau
- Evangelical Reformed Church of the Canton of Vaud
- Evangelical Reformed Church of the Canton of Zürich

In August 2019, the blessing of same-sex marriages is allowed in Swiss Reformed Church.

==== United States ====
The Evangelical Lutheran Church in America began officially allowing blessings of same-sex couples in late August, 2009—though there were no explicit prohibitions before this point. Studies and dialogue had been under way during the past decade and continued until the 2009 Churchwide Assembly, during which the ELCA passed a resolution by a vote of 619–402 reading "Resolved, that the ELCA commit itself to finding ways to allow congregations that choose to do so to recognize, support and hold publicly accountable lifelong, monogamous, same-gender relationships." That Assembly also affirmed that sexual orientation, in itself, is not to be a qualification or exclusion for ordained ministry. As marriage policy is a congregation matter in the ELCA, same-sex partnership blessings and marriages had been performed by many Lutheran pastors prior to the 2009 actions. In 1993 the ELCA Conference of Bishops stated it did not approve of such ceremonies, but made no comment about same-sex marriage. (The Conference of Bishops is an advisory body of the ELCA.)

Lutheran congregations which so choose may register their public affirmation for gay, lesbian, bisexual, and transgender people may register with Lutherans Concerned/North America, a church advocacy group, as "Reconciling in Christ". This registry includes not only congregations, but synods, organizations, Lutheran colleges, campus ministries, social ministry institutions, Lutheran health care organizations, campus ministries, church colleges, regional synods and districts, and other groups which openly welcome gays and lesbians in their communities. The national Lutheran organization which advocates for equality for gays and lesbians inside and outside the church was known as "Lutherans Concerned North America" until 2012, when they changed their name to "ReconcilingWorks: Lutherans for Full Participation". Founded in 1974 Local chapters are found throughout the US and Canada.

In 2015, after the Supreme Court legalized same-sex marriage nationally in the US, the office of the presiding bishop released a letter informing members that each congregation is free to marry gay and lesbian couples or to choose not to do so.

The Reformed Church of America (RCA) allows blessings of same-sex marriages and ordination of homosexual reverends, as for example Rev. Ursula Cargill in New Jersey, but debates have split the church for years and not all congregations recognize this position.

=== Catholic Church ===
On 15 March 2021, the Congregation for the Doctrine of the Faith, under the approval of Pope Francis, released a responsum (doctrinal answer) in which it clarified that the Catholic Church does not have the power to give liturgical blessings of homosexual unions. In an accompanying note, it stated "it is not licit to impart a blessing on relationships, or partnerships, even stable, that involve sexual activity outside of marriage (i.e., outside the indissoluble union of a man and a woman open in itself to the transmission of life), as is the case of the unions between persons of the same sex." On 25 September 2023, in another responsum to conservative cardinals before the World Synod of Bishops, Pope Francis signalled the Church's openness to blessings for gay couples as long as they did not misrepresent the Church's view of marriage as between one man and one woman.

On 18 December 2023, the Dicastery for the Doctrine of the Faith issued a declaration Fiducia supplicans. The doctrinal interpretation by the magisterium, as promulgated (published with legal effect) by Pope Francis, expressly approved blessings for couples of the same sex. These forms of blessing, which are not to be "confus[ed] with the blessing proper to the Sacrament of Marriage," express a "supplication that God may grant those aids that come from the impulses of his Spirit [...] so that human relationships may mature and grow in fidelity to the Gospel, that they may be freed from their imperfections and frailties, and that they may express themselves in the ever-increasing dimension of the divine love." The declaration cleared the way for Catholic priests to bless same-sex couples without subjecting them to "an exhaustive moral analysis", affirming that "a blessing offers people a means to increase their trust in God" who "never turns away anyone who approaches him". The request for a blessing "expresses and nurtures openness to the transcendence, mercy, and closeness to God in a thousand concrete circumstances of life" and is "a seed of the Holy Spirit that must be nurtured, not hindered." These blessings, while "unit[ing] intercessory prayer with the invocation of God's help" for same-sex couples seeking it, should not be included in a liturgical rite, given that "such a ritualization would constitute a serious impoverishment because it would subject a gesture of great value in popular piety to excessive control, depriving ministers of freedom and spontaneity in their pastoral accompaniment of people's lives."

The document details that this type of informal and spontaneous blessing is neither a sacrament nor a rite of the Catholic Church, so no special ceremony is performed for it. The document maintains that sexual relations are licit only within marriage, so heterosexual couples are urged to marry and not consider this blessing as an alternative to marriage. All extramarital sexual relations are considered to be sinful by the Church and continue to be so, which is why it is asked for the affect that may exist between the two people of the same sex involved. The sexual attraction between two people of the same sex is not condemned according to the sexual morality of the Catholic Church, but the sexual act is. In 2024, the Pope clarified that the blessings may not be given to the unions but only the individual persons.

==== France ====
In January 2024, the Roman-Catholic bishop conference in France allowed blessing ceremonies for same-sex partnerships.

==== Germany ====
In May 2021, CBC News reported that Catholic priests in Germany had been secretly blessing same-sex unions for years. In the Diocese of Aachen, five same-sex unions received a blessing in Mönchengladbach in 2003, while over fifty blessings of same-sex unions have been held in recent years. In 2007, one same-sex union received a blessing in Wetzlar in the Diocese of Limburg. In the German Archdiocese of Paderborn, blessings of same-sex unions were allowed in Dortmund. During the week of 23 May 2021, about 120 German priests held blessings including blessings of same-sex unions. Others in relationships the Church regards as sinful, such as attempted remarriage without a declaration of nullity, were also blessed; women preached from pulpits, which is prohibited by the teachings of the Catholic Church.

In May 2015, the Central Committee of German Catholics voted in favour of the blessing of same-sex unions. This position was later reiterated by a number of German bishops. In January 2018, bishop Franz-Josef Bode of the Diocese of Osnabrück said in an interview with German journalists that the blessing of same-sex unions is possible in German Catholic churches. The following month, Cardinal Reinhard Marx, Archbishop of Munich and Freising and chairman of the German Bishops' Conference expressed the same view in an interview. In 2017, the association We Are Church supported the blessing of same-sex marriages. In April and June 2020, bishops Helmut Dieser from the Diocese of Aachen and Georg Bätzing from the Diocese of Limburg said that blessings of same-sex unions in Catholic churches should be allowed. In March 2021, bishop Franz-Josef Overbeck supported blessings for same-sex unions.

In September 2020, bishop Heinrich Timmerevers of the Diocese of Dresden–Meissen supported blessing of same-sex marriages. In February 2021, bishop Peter Kohlgraf from the Diocese of Mainz also expressed support for the blessing of same-sex marriages in Catholic churches. The following month, archbishop Ludwig Schick from the Archdiocese of Bamberg supported blessings of same-sex marriages. From 16 May 2021, many Catholic churches in Germany planned to hold blessings of same-sex marriages in open defiance of the Holy See. The head of the German Bishops Conference has spoken against gay blessings but the lay organisation, the Central Committee of German Catholics, is in favour. This is part of a widespread movement for reform in German Catholic churches. In June 2021, German bishop Bertram Meier from Diocese of Augsburg in Bavaria supported blessings for same-sex marriages, followed by bishop Karl-Heinz Wiesemann in February 2022.

On 1 October 2021, a significant majority of German Catholic bishops and laity supported blessings of same-sex marriages in a document at the Synodal Path. On 11 May 2022, blessings of same-sex marriages were celebrated in more than a hundred Catholic churches in Germany, such as in the cathedral in Magdeburg, and in Essen was first time a Catholic bishop with Ludger Schepers at place. On 11 March 2023, the Synodal Path with support of over 80% of Catholic bishops called for blessing ceremonies for same-sex couples in the German Catholic dioceses. After the Synodal Path, the first German dioceses started blessing ceremonies for same-sex couples in March 2023, including the Diocese of Osnabrück, the Diocese of Essen, the Diocese of Speyer, and the Archdiocese of Berlin. In April 2025, the Roman-Catholic bishop conference in Germany published a supporting document for blessing ceremonies of same-sex unions.

==== Switzerland ====
There have also been discussions about the blessing of same-sex unions and marriages in other countries. In Switzerland, a blessing of a same-sex union took place in Bürglen, Uri in October 2014. The priest subsequently made a public apology. In September 2019, in the Diocese of Basel, blessings of same-sex marriages were allowed by bishop Felix Gmür.

==== Austria ====
In Austria, the blessing of same-sex unions is allowed in the Diocese of Linz. The Parish Priests Initiative led by priest Helmut Schueller is blessing same-sex unions in defiance of the Pope. The group gave a statement which stated "We members of the Parish Priests Initiative are deeply appalled by the new Roman decree that seeks to prohibit the blessing of same-sex loving couples. This is a relapse into times that we had hoped to have overcome with Pope Francis." In May 2020, Austrian Catholic theologian Ewald Volgger published, with the support of Catholic bishop Franz Lackner, a book The benediction of same sex partnerships with liturgical advice, how a rite for blessings of same-sex partnerships might be conducted.

==== Belgium ====
In Belgium, bishop Johan Bonny from the Diocese of Antwerp supported blessing of same-sex marriages in 2015. On 20 September 2022, the Flemish bishops of the Belgian Bishops' Conference issued a document allowing the blessing of same-sex unions, suggesting a ritual that included a prayer and a benediction for stable same-sex unions. But it stressed that it was not "what the Church understands by a sacramental marriage".

==== Italy ====
In January 2024, the Italian bishop conference supported blessing ceremonies for same-sex couples.

==== Malta ====
A blessing of a same-sex union took place by a Catholic Dominican priest in Malta in 2015.

==== Portugal ====
In January 2024, Roman-Catholic bishop conference in Portugal supported blessing ceremonies for same-sex couples.

==== Spain ====
In January 2024, archbishop in Madrid José Cobo and archbishop in Toledo Francisco Cerro supported blessing ceremonies for same-sex couples.

== See also ==
- Adelphopoiesis ("brother-making")
- List of Christian denominational positions on homosexuality
- List of Christian denominations affirming LGBT
- Status of same-sex marriage
- Marriage privatization
- LGBT-affirming religious groups

== Sources ==
- Christian Grethlein: Grundinformation Kasualien. Vandenhoeck & Ruprecht, Göttingen 2007, ISBN 978-3-525-03620-4. Darin: Segnung anlässlich einer Eingetragenen Partnerschaft? p. 265f.
- Wolfgang Schürger: Segnung von gleichgeschlechtlichen Paaren. Bausteine und Erfahrungen. Gütersloher Verlagshaus. Gütersloh 2002. ISBN 3-579-05560-7.
- Segnung von Paaren in eingetragener Lebenspartnerschaft. Materialien für den Gottesdienst (Evangelical Church of Hesse Electorate-Waldeck), Kassel 2013. ISBN 978-3-89477-884-2
- Die Feier der Partnerschaftssegnung im Katholischen Bistum der Alt-Katholiken in Deutschland, Für den gottesdienstlichen Gebrauch erarbeitet durch die Liturgische Kommission und herausgegeben von Bischof und Synodalvertretung, Alt-Katholischer Bistumsverlag, Bonn 2014, ISBN 978-3-934610-91-0.
- Paare.Riten.Kirche. Arbeitsgemeinschaft für römisch-katholische Familienbildung (akf). Germany 2020, ISBN 978-3-89710-861-5
