= Sylvia Michel (minister) =

Swiss church leader (1935–2025)

Sylvia Michel (25 December 1935 – 24 June 2025) was a Swiss Reformed minister. She served as Europe's first female church council president by being elected to the position for the Reformed Church of Aargau. A church award is named after her. She also served as president of a working group concerning South Africa. Michel died at a nursing home in Wald, Zürich, on 24 June 2025, at the age of 89.
