= Union of Evangelical Reformed Churches in Russia =

The Union of Evangelical Reformed Churches in Russia was formed after the collapse of the Soviet Union in 1990. In 1991, congregations were established in Tver and Moscow and a year later the denomination was formed. The church subscribes the Westminster Confession of Faith, the Heidelberg Catechism, the Canons of Dort and the Apostles Creed. There are no women ordinated. Currently, it has three congregations in Moscow, St. Petersburg and Kazan. The St. Petersburg congregation was formed as a result of a merger of a Korean and a traditional Russian church. The church begun to publish Calvinist literature in Russia.

In 2008, it had four congregations, which grew to 15 in 2010. The denomination works to gain possession of three church buildings in St. Petersburg, one in Moscow, which was formerly owned by Swiss, German and French Reformed denominations before the rise of communism in 1917.

Partner church relations was established with the Reformed Churches in the Netherlands (Liberated) and it hopes to establish ties with other Presbyterian denominations throughout the world.
