= Rita Famos =

Swiss theologian

- President of the Protestant Church of Switzerland
- Church: Protestant Church of Switzerland
- Appointed: 2 November 2020
- Predecessor: Gottfried W. Locher

Personal details
- Born: 11 January 1966 (age 60) Zweisimmen, Bern, Switzerland
- Denomination: Protestant
- Spouse: Cla Famos
- Children: 2

Rita Famos (born 11 January 1966) is a Swiss Reformed minister and theologian. Since 2 November 2020, she has served as President of the Protestant Church of Switzerland and is the first woman to hold this position.

== Life and career ==
Rita Famos studied theology in Bern, Halle (GDR) and Richmond (USA). After her ordination, she worked as a parish priest in Uster and Zurich-Enge. From 2009 to 2011, she was spokeswoman for the word on Sunday at Schweizer Radio und Fernsehen (SRF). Since 2013, she has been head of the department for special pastoral care at the Evangelical Reformed Church of the Canton of Zürich.

Famos succeeded Gottfried Locher as President of the Protestant Church of Switzerland. He resigned in May 2020 after a complaint about abuse of power and "psychological and sexual violations of boundaries". After the turbulence surrounding Gottfried Locher, Famos is to lead the Evangelical Reformed Church out of the crisis as a beacon of hope. In interviews, she emphasized that she wanted to "establish a participatory leadership culture" and work towards the Reformed Church moving together.

She is President of the Association for Couples Counseling and Mediation in the Canton of Zurich and a member of the program management for training and further education in pastoral care.

== Personal life ==
Famos is married to theologian and lawyer Cla Famos and has two children.
