= Protestant Church of Switzerland =

Swiss association

Protestant Church in Switzerland
- Type: Communion of 25 regional and denominational churches
- Classification: Protestant
- Orientation: Continental Reformed (with the exception of one Methodist church)
- Polity: Governance structure varies across churches
- Associations: World Communion of Reformed Churches; World Council of Churches; Conference of Churches on the Rhine; Community of Protestant Churches in Europe
- Region: Switzerland
- Headquarters: Bern, Switzerland
- Origin: 1920; Olten
- Congregations: 982
- Members: 1,782,513 (2024)
- Official website: www.evref.ch/en/

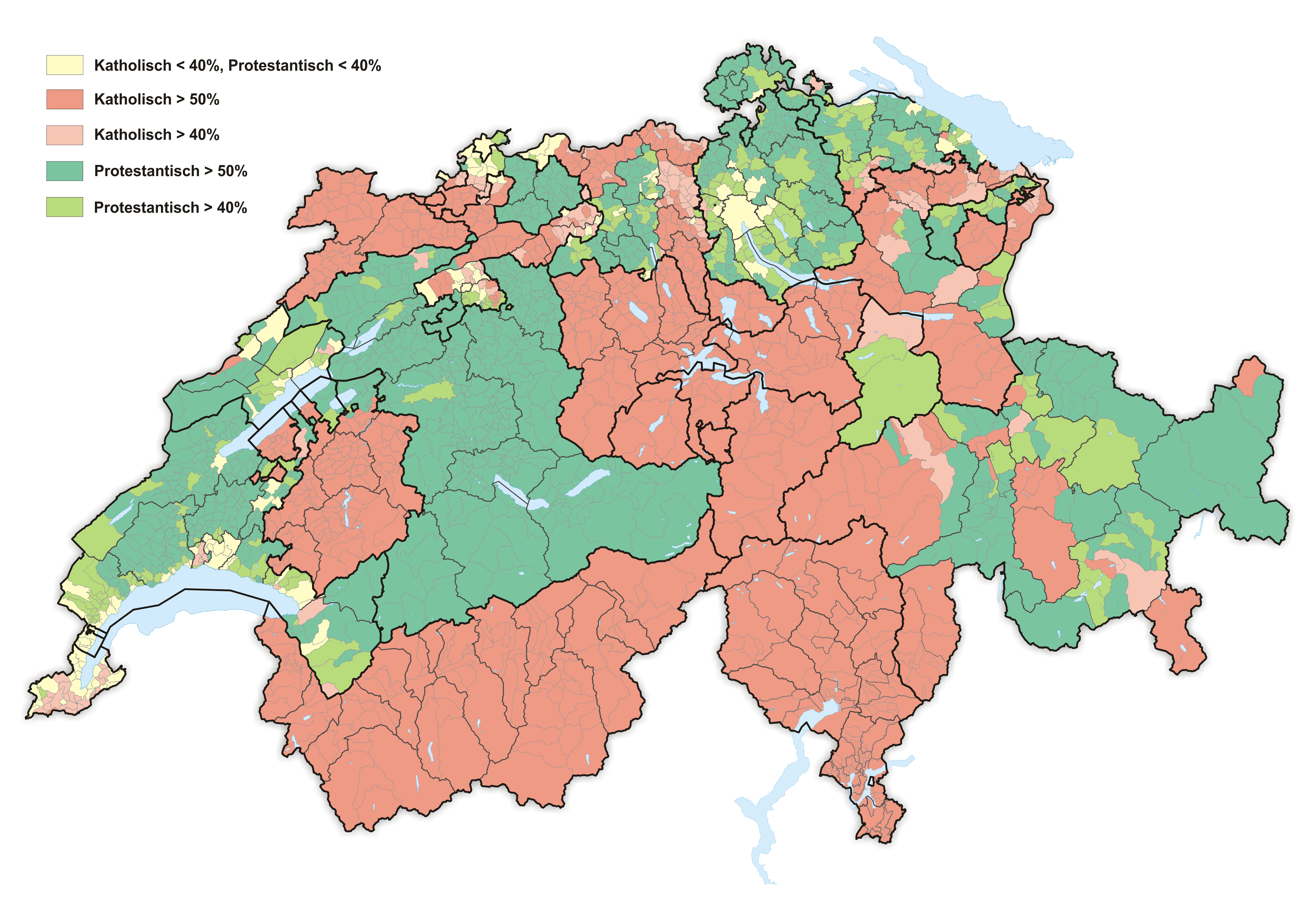
Distribution of denominations in Switzerland in 2017 (green: Protestant, red: Catholic)

The Protestant Church in Switzerland (PCS), (Note: German: Evangelisch-reformierte Kirche Schweiz (EKS); French: Église évangélique réformée de Suisse (EERS); Italian: Chiesa evangelica riformata in Svizzera (CERiS); Romansh: Baselgia evangelica refurmada da la Svizra (BRRS)) formerly named Federation of Swiss Protestant Churches (Note: German: Schweizerischer Evangelischer Kirchenbund (SEK); French: Fédération des Eglises protestantes de Suisse (FEPS); Italian: Federazione delle Chiese evangeliche della Svizzera; Romansh: Federaziun da las baselgias evangelicas da la Svizra) until 31 December 2019, is a federation of 25 member churches – 24 cantonal churches and the Evangelical-Methodist Church of Switzerland. The PCS is not a church in a theological understanding, because every member is independent with its own theological and formal organisation. It serves as a legal umbrella before the federal government and represents the church in international relations. Except for the Evangelical-Methodist Church, which covers all of Switzerland, the member churches are restricted to a certain territory.

The president of the PCS is Rita Famos.

== History ==
The Reformation spread primarily into the cities of Switzerland, which was then composed of loosely connected cantons. Breakthroughs began in the 1520s in Zurich under Huldrych Zwingli, in Bern in 1528 under Berchtold Haller, and in Basel in 1529 under Johannes Oecolampadius. After the death of Zwingli in 1531, the Reformation continued. The French-speaking cities Neuchâtel, Geneva and Lausanne changed to the Reformation ten years later under William Farel and John Calvin coming from France. The Zwingli and Calvin branches had each their theological distinctions, but in 1549 under the lead of Bullinger and Calvin they came to a common agreement in the Consensus Tigurinus (Zürich Consent), and 1566 in the Second Helvetic Confession. The German Reformed ideological center was Zurich, while the French-speaking Reformed movement bastion was Geneva.

A feature of the Swiss Reformed churches in the Zwinglian tradition is their historically very close links to the cantons, which is only loosening gradually in the present. In cities where the Reformed faith became leading theology, several confessions were written, some of them:

- The 67 Articles of Zurich
- Theses of Berne 1528
- Berne Synodus 1532
- Confession of Geneva 1537
- Second Helvetic Confession written by Bullinger in 1566

In the mid-19th century, opposition to liberal theology and interventions by the state led to secessions in several cantonal churches. One of these secessionist churches still exists today, the Evangelical Free Church of Geneva, founded in 1849, while two others reunited with the Swiss Reformed Church in 1943 and 1966. An important issue to liberal theologians was the Apostles' Creed. They questioned its binding character. This caused a heated debate. Until the late 1870s, most cantonal reformed churches stopped prescribing any particular creed.

In 1920 the Federation of Swiss Protestant Churches (Schweizerischer Evangelischer Kirchenbund, Fédération des Eglises protestantes de Suisse, Federazione delle Chiese evangeliche della Svizzera – SEK-FEPS), with 24 member churches—22 cantonal churches and 2 free churches (Free Church of Geneva and the Evangelical-Methodist Church of Switzerland), was formed to serve as a legal umbrella before the federal government and represent the church in international relations.

== Statistics ==
Year	Members
2016	2,212,881
2017	2,182,293
2018	2,147,552
2019	2,068,430
2020	2,021,075
2021	1,948,334
2022	1,926,637
2023	1,862,689
2024	1,782,513

In the 21st century, the Reformed Church in Switzerland faced a rapid decline due to the secularization of national society. In 2024, the denomination had 1,782,513 members.

== Beliefs ==
The ordination of women is allowed in all member churches.

=== Marriage ===
As early as 1999, the Reformed churches in St. Gallen, Fribourg, and Lucerne had allowed church celebration services for same-sex couples. The Reformed Church in Aargau has also permitted prayer services of thanksgiving to celebrate a same-sex civil union. The Reformed Church of Vaud in 2013 also permitted prayer services as a way for same-sex couples to celebrate their civil union.

Other member churches that allow either prayer services or blessings for same-sex union are the churches in Bern-Jura-Solothurn, Schaffhausen, Tessin, Thurgau, and Zürich. Like many other European Protestant denominations, several of the Swiss Reformed churches have openly welcomed gay and lesbian members to celebrate their civil unions within a church context. As early as 1999, the Reformed Churches in St. Gallen, Fribourg, and Lucerne had permitted prayer and celebration services for same-sex couples to recognize their civil unions. Since then, the Reformed Church in Aargau has also allowed for prayer services to celebrate same-sex couples. To date, seven other Swiss Reformed churches, including Bern-Jura-Solothurn, Graubünden, Schaffhausen, Ticino, Thurgau, Vaud, and Zürich, have allowed the blessing of same-sex unions for same-sex civil unions.

In August 2019, with the Evangelical Reformed Church of the Canton of Zürich, the first church of the Swiss Reformed Church allowed the blessings of same-sex marriage and the Swiss Reformed Church allowed blessing of same-sex marriages for its member churches in November.

A 2019 resolution allows local churches to decide about blessings of same-sex marriage.

== Members of the communion ==
Organizationally, the Reformed Churches in Switzerland remain separate, cantonal units. The German churches are more in the Zwinglian tradition; the French more in the Calvinist tradition. They are governed synodically and their relation to the respective canton (in Switzerland, there are no church-state regulations at a national level) ranges from independent to close collaboration, depending on historical developments. The exception is the Evangelical-Methodist Church, which is nationally active.

Reformed Churches in the Swiss cantons:

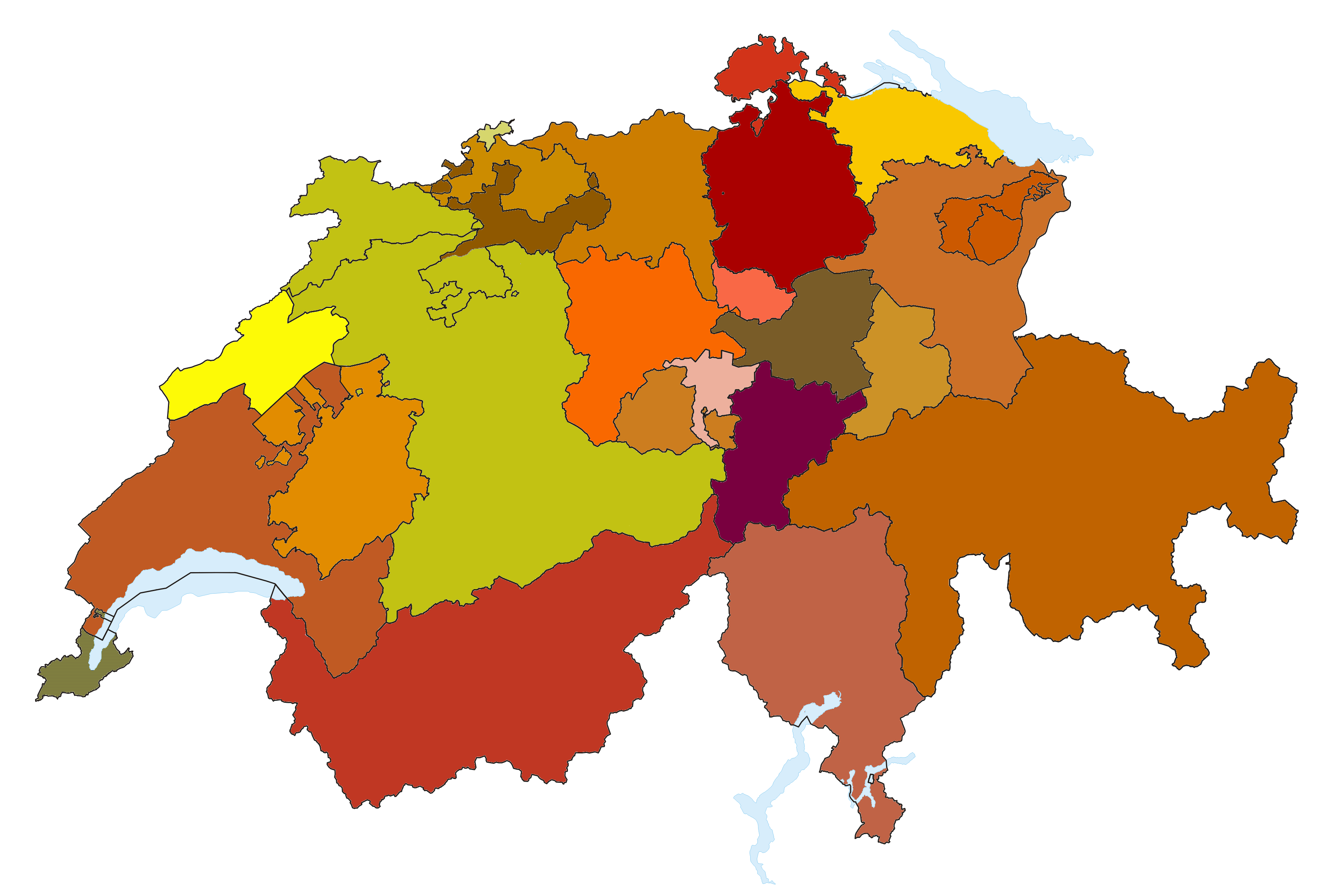
Reformed "Landeskirchen" of Switzerland (Districts and Sub Districts as of 2009)

- Reformed Church of Aargau
- Evangelical-Reformed Church of Appenzell
- Evangelical Reformed Church of the Canton Basel-Landschaft
- Evangelical-Reformed Church of the Canton Basel-Stadt
- Reformed Churches of the Canton Bern-Jura-Solothurn
- Evangelical Reformed Church of the Canton Freiburg
- Protestant Church of Geneva
- Evangelical-Reformed Church of the Canton of Glarus
- Evangelical-Reformed Church of Graubünden
- Evangelical Reformed Church of the Canton of Lucerne
- Reformed Church of the Canton of Neuchâtel
- Evangelical-Reformed Church of Nidwalden
- Association of Evangelical-Reformed Churches in the Canton of Obwalden
- Evangelical-Reformed Church of the Canton of St. Gallen
- Evangelical-Reformed Church of the Canton of Schaffhausen
- Evangelical-Reformed Church of the Canton of Schwyz
- Evangelical-Reformed Church of the Canton of Solothurn
- Evangelical Reformed Church of Ticino
- Evangelical Church of the Canton of Thurgau
- Evangelical-Reformed Church of Uri
- Evangelical Reformed Church of the Canton of Vaud
- Evangelical Reformed Church in Valais
- Evangelical-Reformed Church of the Canton of Zürich
- Evangelical-Reformed Church of the Canton of Zug
- United Methodist Church (Swiss part)

== See also ==
- Religion in Switzerland
- Federation of Evangelical Lutheran Churches in Switzerland and the Principality of Liechtenstein
