= Evangelical Church =

The Evangelical Church may refer to:

== In general ==
- Protestantism, whose followers during the reformation were called evangelicals
- Evangelicalism, especially those associated with the National Association of Evangelicals
- Lutheranism, as Martin Luther preferred the term evangelical to Lutheran

== Church denominations ==
=== Africa ===
- Ethiopian Evangelical Church Mekane Yesus
- Evangelical Church of Egypt (Synod of the Nile)
- Evangelical Church of West Africa
- Evangelical Church in Zambia, now part of Serving in Mission

=== Asia ===
- Armenian Evangelical Church
- Assyrian Evangelical Church
- Evangelical Church of India
- St. Thomas Evangelical Church of India

=== Europe ===
- Evangelical Church of Czech Brethren
- Evangelical Church in Germany, the largest Protestant denomination in Germany
- Evangelical Church of Romania
- Christian Evangelical Church of Romania
- Evangelical Church of the Augsburg Confession in Slovakia
- Fellowship of Independent Evangelical Churches (United Kingdom)

=== North America ===
- Evangelical Lutheran Church in Canada, the largest Lutheran denomination in Canada
- Evangelical Missionary Church (Canada)
- Evangelical Church of the Dominican Republic
- Evangelical Association, a predecessor to the Evangelical United Brethren Church
- Evangelical Covenant Church
- Evangelical Church of North America (ECNA), a Wesleyan denomination also known as the Evangelical Church
- Evangelical Free Church of America, formed in 1942
- Evangelical Lutheran Church in America, the largest Lutheran denomination in the US
- Evangelical Methodist Church
- Evangelical Presbyterian Church (United States)
- Evangelical Synod of North America, founded in the mid-19th century and centered in the Midwest, usually referred to simply as the Evangelical Church, one of the historic predecessor bodies of the United Church of Christ
- Evangelical United Brethren Church (1946–1968), merged into the United Methodist Church

== See also ==
- Evangelical Lutheran Church (disambiguation)
- Evangelical Presbyterian Church (disambiguation)
- Evangelical Reformed Church (disambiguation)
