= Reformed Church of Aargau =

Church in Switzerland

The Reformed Church of Aargau or Reformierte Landeskirche des Kantons Aargau is a Reformed state cantonal church in Aargau, Switzerland. It was founded in 1803, and according to the 2004 statistics the Aargau Reformed Church had 76 Presbyteries and 1 Synod with almost 200,000 members, 76 parishes, and 107 ordained clergy. The official language is German. It is a member of the Schweizerischer Evangelischer Kirchenbund. Women's ordination is allowed. Blessing of same-sex unions was allowed and on September 18, 2019, blessing of same-sex marriages was allowed.

== List of churches ==
Ort (Gemeinde)	Name of the church	Parish	Church patron	Founding date of the church	First church founding date	Construction date of the church building
Aarau	Reformed Church Aarau	Aarau	Jungfrau Maria	—	1275	1471–1478
Aarburg	Reformed Church Aarburg	Aarburg	—	—	—	1842–1845
Ammerswil	Reformed Church Ammerswil	Ammerswil-Dintikon	Petrus	—	1275	—
Auenstein	Reformed Church Auenstein	Auenstein	—	—	1302	—
Baden	Reformed Church Baden	Baden	—	1714	1714	1714
Beinwil am See	Reformed Church Beinwil am See	Beinwil am See	—	—	1935	1935
Bergdietikon	Bergdietikon Church	Bergdietikon	—	—	1961	1961
Birmenstorf	Reformed Church Birmenstorf	Birmenstorf-Gebenstorf-Turgi	—	—	1936	1936
Birr	Reformed Church Birr	Birr	—	vor 12. Jh.	1370	1662
Birrwil	Reformed Church Birrwil	Birrwil	—	—	1275	1689
Kirchbözberg	Reformed Church Bözberg	Bözberg-Mönthal	Michael	11. Jh.	—	—
Bözen	Reformed Church Bözen	Bözen	originally Marienkapelle	—	—	1667
Bremgarten AG	Reformed Church Bremgarten	Bremgarten-Mutschellen	—	—	1900	1900
Brittnau	Reformed Church Brittnau	Brittnau	Hl. Verena	10/11. Jh.	—	1585
Brugg	Reformed State Church Brugg	Brugg	Hl. Nikolaus	—	1227	1734-1740
Brunegg	Reformed Church Brunegg	Birr	—	—	1967	1967
Buchs AG	Reformed Buchs	Buchs-Rohr	—	—	1949/50	1949/50
Densbüren	Reformed Church Densbüren	Densbüren	—	—	—	1552-1558
Egliswil	Church in Egliswil	Seengen	Hl. Gallus	11. Jh.	—	—
Ehrendingen	Reformed Church Ehrendingen	Baden	—	—	1983/84	1983/84
Erlinsbach AG	Reformed Church Erlinsbach	Erlinsbach	—	1565	1565	1565
Fislisbach	Reformed Church Fislisbach	Mellingen	—	—	—	—
Frick	Reformed Church Frick	Frick	—	—	1910	1910
Gebenstorf	Reformed Church Gebenstorf	Birmenstorf-Gebenstorf-Turgi	Hl. Margaretha	verm. 12. Jh.	1247	1891
Gontenschwil	Reformed Church Gontenschwil	Gontenschwil-Zetzwil	—	nach 1275	1295	1622
Gränichen	Reformed Church Gränichen	Gränichen	—	—	—	1661-1663
Hausen AG	Reformed Church Hausen	Windisch	—	—	—	—
Hendschiken	Reformed Church Hendschiken	Lenzburg-Hendschiken	—	—	—	1982
Holderbank	Reformed Church Holderbank	Holderbank-Möriken-Wildegg	—	13. Jh.	—	um 1702
Hunzenschwil	Reformed Church Hunzenschwil	Suhr-Hunzenschwil	—	—	1959/60	1959/60
Kirchberg (Küttigen)	Church in Kirchberg	Kirchberg	—	—	1036	um 1500
Kirchleerau	Reformed Church Kirchleerau	Leerau	—	um 1050	1275	1275
Klingnau	Reformed Church Klingnau	Klingnau-Döttingen-Kleindöttingen	—	—	1935	1935
Koblenz AG	Reformed Church Koblenz	Koblenz	—	—	—	
Kölliken	Reformed Church Kölliken	Kölliken	—	—	1507	1507
Unterkulm	Reformed Church Kulm	Kulm	Hl. Martin	11. Jh.	1275	um 1500
Laufenburg AG	Reformed Church Laufenburg	Laufenburg und Umgebung	—	—	1958/59	1958/59
Lenzburg	State church Lenzburg	Lenzburg-Hendschiken	—	—	15. Jh.	1667
Leutwil	Reformed Church Leutwil	Leutwil-Dürrenäsch	—	—	1273	—
Mandach	Church Mandach	Mandach	—	11. Jh.	—	—
Meisterschwanden	Reformed Church Meisterschwanden	Meisterschwanden-Fahrwangen	—	—	1820-1822	1820-1822
Melligen	Reformed Church Mellingen	Mellingen	—	—	—	—
Menziken	Reformed Church Menziken	Menziken-Burg	—	—	1890	1890
Möhlin	Reformed Church Möhlin	Möhlin	—	—	1947/48	1947/48
Mönthal	Reformed Church Mönthal	Bözberg-Mönthal	Hl. Georg	verm. 11. Jh.	1273	k. A.
Möriken (Möriken-Wildegg)	Reformed Church Möriken	Holderbank-Möriken-Wildegg	—	—	—	—
Muhen	Reformed Church Muhen	Muhen	—	—	—	—
Glashütten (Murgenthal)	Reformed Church Murgenthal	Murgenthal	—	—	—	—
Muri	Reformierte Kirche Muri	Muri	—	—	1955	1955
Widen	Church in Mutschellen	Bremgarten-Mutschellen	—	—	—	—
Niederlenz	Reformed Church Niederlenz	Niederlenz	—	—	1947-1949	1947-1949
Oberentfelden	Reformed Church Oberentfelden	Oberentfelden	—	—	—	—
Obersiggenthal	Reformed Church Centrum Obersiggenthal	Baden	—	1985	1985	1985
Oftringen	Church in Oftringen	Oftringen	—	—	1933/34	1933/34
Othmarsingen	Reformed Church Othmarsingen	Othmarsingen	—	—	1675	1675
Rein (Rüfenach)	Church in Rein	Rein	—	verm. 8. Jh.	—	1864
Reinach AG	Reformed Church Reinach	Reinach-Leimbach	—	—	1528/29	1528/29
Reitnau	Reformed Church Reitnau	Reitnau	—	—	—	1522
Remigen	Reformed Church Remigen	Rein	Petrus	11./12. Jh.	1347	—
Rheinfelden	Reformed Church Rheinfelden	Rheinfelden	—	—	—	—
Rohr (Aarau)	Reformed Church Rohr	Buchs-Rohr	—	—	1959	1959
Oberrohrdorf	Reformed Church Rohrdorf	Mellingen	—	—	—	—
Rothrist	Reformed Church Rothrist	Rothrist	Petrus	—	1714	1714
Kirchrued (Schlossrued)	Church in Rued	Rothrist	—	vor dem 11. Jh.	—	um 1500
Rupperswil	Reformed Church Rupperswil	Rupperswil	—	Ende 13. Jh.	—	1920
Safenwil	Reformed Church Safenwil	Safenwil	—	—	1866	1866
Schafisheim	Church in Schafisheim	Staufberg	Hl. Leodegar	—	—	1498
Schinznach-Dorf	Reformed Church Schinznach-Dorf	Schinznach-Dorf	—	—	1227	Ende 18. Jh.
Schöftland	Reformed Church Schöftland	Schöftland	—	um 650	—	1683
Seengen	Reformed Church Seengen	Seengen	—	—	—	1820/21
Seon	Reformed Church Seon	Seon	Hl. Martin	—	1408	1708
Spreitenbach	Old parish church (Spreitenbach)	Spreitenbach-Killwangen	—	—	1184	1638
Spreitenbach	Church in Hasel	Spreitenbach-Killwangen	—	—	—	—
Staufen	Staufbergkirche	Staufberg	Hl. Laurentius	10. Jh.	1101	—
Stein AG	Reformed Church Stein	Stein und Umgebung	—	—	1927	1927
Strengelbach	Reformed Church Strengelbach	Zofingen	—	—	—	—
Suhr	Reformed Church Suhr	Suhr-Hunzenschwil	—	ca. 9. Jh.		1495
Tegerfelden	Reformed Church Tegerfelden	Tegerfelden	—	—	—	1662–1664
Teufenthal	Church in Teufenthal	Kulm	—	—		
Thalheim	Church Thalheim	Thalheim	Petrus	—	14. Jh.	—
Turgi	Reformed Church Turgi	Birmenstorf-Gebenstorf-Turgi	—	—	—	1959/1960
Umiken (Brugg)	Reformed Church Umiken	Umiken	Hl. Mauritius	—	1254	—
Uerkheim	Reformed Church Uerkheim	Uerkheim	-	—	-	-
Unterentfelden	Reformed Church Unterentfelden	Unterentfelden	-	—	-	—
Untersiggenthal	Reformed Church Untersiggenthal	Baden	—	—	—	—
Veltheim	Reformed Church Veltheim	Veltheim-Oberflachs	Johannes der Täufer	um 745	1040	1760
Villigen	Reformed Church Villigen	Rein	—	—	1347	—
Villmergen	Reformed Church Villmergen	Wohlen	—	—	–	–
Wettingen	Reformed Church Wettingen	Wettingen-Neuenhof	—	—	1939	1939
Windisch	Reformed Church Windisch	Windisch	—	—	—	um 1300
Wohlen	Reformed Church Wohlen	Wohlen	—	—	1925/26	1925/26
Würenlos	Reformed Church Würenlos	Würenlos	—	—	1937	1937
Zetzwil	Church Zetzwil	Gontenschwil-Zetzwil	—	—	1942	1942
Zofingen	State Church in Zofingen	Zofingen	Hl. Mauritius	7. Jh.	—	12. Jh.
Bad Zurzach	Reformed Church in Zurzach	Zurzach	—	—	1716	1716

== See also ==
- Sylvia Michel (minister)
