= Evangelical Church of the Canton of Thurgau =

Reformed regional church in the canton of Thurgau

The Reformed Church of Thurgau or Evangelische Landeskirche des Kantons Thurgau is a Reformed state cantonal church in Thurgau, Switzerland. It was founded in 1803. The official language is German. It is a member of the Federation of Swiss Protestant Churches. The Reformed Church of Thurgau has 66 parishes. Women's ordination is allowed. The Blessing of same-sex unions is allowed.
