= Evangelical Methodist Church in Argentina =

The Argentine Evangelical Methodist Church (Spanish: Iglesia Evangélica Metodista Argentina) is a member of the World Council of Churches and has 8,940 members and 123 congregations. While autonomous, the denomination is affiliated with the United Methodist Church.

== History ==
In 1836, the Methodist Episcopal Church decided to send missionaries to Buenos Aires. Earlier Methodist bodies, resulting from the missions, merged to form the Evangelical Methodist Church in Argentina in 1969.

== Beliefs ==
Women are able to be ordained in the denomination.

=== Marriage ===
The church has given freedom to each congregation for blessings of same-sex marriage. In an episcopal letter, Bishop Frank de Nully Brown shared that the church opposes any kind of secular or religions discrimination.
