= Evangelical Reformed Churches in Poland =

Polish Reformed Christian church

The Evangelical Reformed Churches in Poland (in Polish its called the Ewangeliczny Kosciol Reformowany) is a Reformed church in the country of Poland. This church is a member of the World Communion of Reformed Churches and strives to teach ERC principles to their followers and follow the sacred scripture (ERC Poland).

== Origin ==
Evangelical Reformed Churches (Ewangeliczny Kosciol Reformowany) in Poland were founded in 1995 and since 2006 are members of the Confederation of Reformed Evangelical Churches. There are two particular churches (in Poznań and Wrocław) and two mission churches (in Gdańsk and Legnica). In their teaching and practice the ERC in Poland follow the two main Reformers: Martin Luther and John Calvin.

== Doctrine ==
The confessional standards of the ERC in Poland are the Three Forms of Unity.

== Magazine ==
The ERChurches in Poland publish a quarterly magazine Reformacja w Polsce.

== Association ==
CREC Europe
ERC Poland
