= Evangelical Reformed Church of the Canton of Lucerne =

The Evangelical Reformed Church of the Canton of Lucerne, or in German the Evangelisch-Reformierte Kirche des Kantons Luzern, is a Reformed state church in the Canton of Lucerne, Switzerland.

In 2004, it had 43,000 members, 18 parishes, and 35 ordained clergy. It has Presbyterian-Synodal church government. Congregations are founded in Aesch, Adligenswil, Alberswil, Altishofen, Altwis, Baldegg, Ballwil, Beromünster, Bramboden, Buchrain, Buchs, Büron, Buttisholtz, Dagmersellen, Dierikon, Doppleschwand, Ebersecken, Ebikon, Egolzwil, Eich, Emmen, Entlebuch, Ermensee, Ecshenbach, Escholzmatt, Ettiswil, Fischbach, Flühli, Geiss, Gelfingen, Gettnau, Geuensee, Gisikon, Greppen, Grossdietwil, Grosswangen, Gunzwil, Hamikon, Hasle, Heiligkreuz, Hergiswil, Herlisberg, Hertenstein, Hildisrieden, Hitzkirch, Hochdorf, Hohenrain, Honau, Horw, Inwil, Kleinwangen, Knutwil, Knottwil, Kriens, Kulmerau, Lieli, Luzern, Littau, Luthern, Malters, Marbach, Mauensee, Meggen, Meierskappen, Menznau, Mosen, Nebikon, Neudorf, Nottwil, Oberkirch, Ohmstahl, Pfaffnau, Retcshwil, Rickenbach, Root, Romoos, Ruswil, Schenkon, Schötz, St. Erhardt, Sulz, Sursee, Triengen, Uffikon, Ufhusen, Vitznau, Wauwil, Weggis, Werthenstein, Wiggen, Wikon, Wilihof, Wolhusen, and Zell.

It is a member of the Federation of Swiss Protestant Churches, and subscribes to the Leuenberg Concordia (1973). The ordination of women and the blessing of same-sex unions are allowed.
