= Reformed Churches of the Canton Bern-Jura-Solothurn =

The Evangelical Reformed Church of the Canton Bern-Jura-Solothurn is a Reformed state church in three cantons of Switzerland. It is located within the Canton of Bern, Canton of Jura, and Canton of Solothurn.

The official worship languages are German and French. Languages during church services are Czech, French, German, Hungarian, Italian, Korean and Slovak. The denomination has a Presbyterian-Synodal church government.

In 2004, it had 745,000 members, 230 parishes, and 1,000 house fellowships.

== Beliefs ==
Women's ordination is allowed.

=== Marriage ===
Since 1999, the church has allowed blessings of same-sex unions. In 2022, the church adopted an inclusive vision and celebrates both opposite-sex marriages and same-sex marriages.

== Congregations−parishes ==
Congregations can be found in:

- Aarberg
- Aarwangen
- Adelboden
- Affoltern im Emmental
- Aeschi - Krattigen
- Aetingen-Mühledorf
- Amsoldingen
- Arch
- Bargen
- Bätterkinden
- Beatenberg
- Belp
- Belpberg
- Bern
- Gesamtkirchgemeinde
- Bern-Bethlehem
- Bern-Bümpliz
- Bern City-Kirche
- Bern-Frieden
- Bern Heiliggeist
- Bern Inselspital Seelsorge
- Bern-Johannes
- Bern Offene Heiliggeistkirche
- Bern-Markus
- Bern-Matthäus
- Bern-Münster
- Bern-Nydegg
- Bern-Paulus
- Bern - Paroisse française
- Bern-Petrus
- Biberist-Gerlafingen
- Biel-Bienne
- Biglen-Landiswil
- Bleienbach
- Blumenstein
- Bolligen
- Boltigen
- Brienz
- Buchen
- Buchholterberg
- Burgdorf
- Büren an der Aare
- Bürglen
- Diemtigen
- Diessbach
- Diesse
- Dürrenroth
- Eggiwil
- Eriswil
- Erlach-Tschugg
- Erlenbach
- Frauenkappelen
- Ferenbalm
- Frutigen
- Gadmen
- Gampelen-Gals
- Gerzensee
- Goldswil
- Gottstatt
- Grafenried
- Fraubrunnen
- Grenchen-Bettlach
- Grindelwald
- Grossaffoltern
- Grosshöchstetten
- Gstaad-Saanen
- Gsteig bei Gstaad
- Gsteig-Interlaken
- Guggisberg
- Gurzelen - Seftigen
- Guttannen
- Habkern
- Hasle bei Burgdorf
- Heimberg
- Heimiswil
- Herzogenbuchsee
- Hilterfingen
- Hindelbank
- Huttwil
- Innertkirchen
- Ins
- Interlaken Ost Pfarrkreis Matten-Interlaken
- Ittigen
- Jegenstorf
- Kallnach-Niederried
- Kandergrund-Kandersteg
- Kappelen-Werdt
- Kehrsatz
- Kerzers
- Kirchberg
- Kirchdorf
- Kirchlindach Köniz
- Kirchenkreis Köniz
- Kirchenkreis Liebefeld Köniz
- Kirchenkreis Oberwangen Köniz
- Kirchenkreis Schliern
- Köniz
- Kirchenkreis Spiegel
- Köniz
- Kirchenkreis Wabern
- Konolfingen
- Koppigen
- Krauchthal
- La Ferrière
- La Neuveville
- Langenthal
- Langnau
- Lauenen
- Laupen
- Lauperswil
- Lauterbrunnen
- Leissigen-Därligen
- Lengnau
- Lenk
- Leuzigen
- Ligerz
- Limpach
- Linden
- Lotzwil
- Lüsslingen
- Lützelflüh
- Lyss
- Madiswil
- Meikirch
- Meiringen
- Melchnau
- Messen
- Mühleberg
- Münchenbuchsee - Moosseedorf
- Münchenwiler-Clavaleyres
- Münsingen
- Muri-Gümligen
- Neuenegg
- Nidau
- Niederbipp
- Niederried
- Nods
- Oberbalm
- Oberbipp
- Oberburg
- Oberdiessbach
- Oberwil b. Büren
- Ostermundigen
- Grandval
- Moutier
- Court
- Bévilard
- Reconvilier
- Tavannes
- Tramelan et Sornetan
- Pilgerweg Bielersee
- Radelfingen
- Rapperswil-Bangerten
- Reichenbach
- Reutigen
- Riggisberg-Rüti
- Ringgenberg
- Roggwil
- Rohrbach
- Rondchâtel
- Röthenbach
- Rüderswil
- Rüegsau
- Rüeggisberg
- Rüschegg
- Rüti bei Büren
- Saanen-Gstaad
- Saint-Imier - Ergüel
- Schangnau
- Schlosswil-Oberhünigen
- Schüpfen
- Schwarzenburg
- Schwarzenegg
- Seeberg
- Seedorf
- Signau
- Sigriswil
- Siselen-Finsterhennen
- Sonceboz-Sombeval
- Solothurn
- Sornetan
- Spiez
- Sumiswald
- Sutz-Lattrigen
- Steffisburg
- Stettlen
- Täuffelen
- Tavannes
- Thierachern
- Thun
- Gesamtkirchgemeinde
- Thun
- Lerchenfeld
- Thun
- Schönau
- Thun
- Stadt
- Thun Strättligen
- Thunstetten
- Thurnen
- Toffen
- Trachselwald
- Tramelan
- Trub im Emmental
- Trubschachen
- Twann-Tüscherz
- Unterseen
- Ursenbach
- Urtenen-Schönbühl
- Utzenstorf
- Vauffelin
- Vechigen
- Vinelz
- Walperswil-Bühl
- Walkringen
- Walterswil
- Wangen an der Aare
- Wasen
- Wasseramt
- Wattenwil
- Wichtrach
- Wimmis
- Wohlen bei Bern
- Worb
- Wynau
- Wynigen
- Wyssachen
- Zimmerwald
- Zollikofen
- Zweisimmen

== Districts ==
Reformed Church districts include:

- Bern-Mittelland-Nord
- Bern-Mittelland-Süd
- Bern-Stadt
- Frutigen-Niedersimmental
- Interlaken-Oberhasli
- Jura (Arrondissement)
- Oberaargau
- Oberemmental
- Obersimmental-Saanen
- Seeland
- Thun
- Unteres Emmental
