= Evangelical Reformed Church in Sweden =

The Evangelical Reformed Church in Sweden (Swedish: Evangelisk-reformerta kyrkan i Sverige, ERKIS) was formed with help from Mission to the World missionaries of the Presbyterian Church in America. There is one congregations in Tranås. The church became part of the Presbytery of the Evangelical Presbyterian Church in England and Wales in 2009.

The work was started in 2000 by Rev. Gary Johnson from the PCA and Rev. David Bergmark a Swedish native Sweden trained in the Reformed Theological Seminary in Jackson, Mississippi. Rev Gary Johnson and his family moved from Sweden and the work in the church in Tranås in 2010.

The church has contacts with the Reformed Churches in the Netherlands (Liberated) and the Free Church of Scotland.

The Westminster Confession of Faith is the official statement of faith.
