= Evangelical Reformed Church in Japan =

The Evangelical Reformed Church in Japan was founded by South African missionaries. They formed their first congregation in Oita Prefecture. Japanese pastors joined this work. Two mission congregations were founded. The church adheres to the Apostles' Creed and the Westminster Confession of Faith.
