= Evangelical Reformed Church in Transcarpathia =

The Evangelical Reformed Church in Transcarpathia is a conservative Calvinist denomination in Transcarpathia. The church was founded in 2006. The new denomination separated from the Reformed Church in Transcarpathia because of the liberal teaching of the church and the unbiblical episcopal government. The members are ethnic Hungarian. It has about 200 members in 6 congregations (including congregations in Vyshkovo, Beregszász, Beregújfalu) and Bible study classes in 12 villages. In 2007 the church was registered by the government. The denomination affirms the Westminster Confession of Faith, Second Helvetic Confession, and the Heidelberg catechism. It has a presbyterian church government, with a synod and local presbyterian councils. The church established close relationship with the Reformed Churches in the Netherlands (Liberated).
