= New Journey Ministries =

Pentecostal Christian denomination

Coordinates: 27.9061°N 82.3263°W

The New Journey Ministries (formerly Global Alliance of Affirming Apostolic Pentecostals (GAAAP)) is an affirming, Oneness Pentecostal denomination, previously headquartered in Indianapolis, Indiana, and later Thonotosassa, Florida. It is a nonprofit organization based in Quincy, Florida.

GAAAP is one of six LGBT-affirming Pentecostal networks, and was organized in 2007 by Rev. Kevin Konkle then of Indianapolis, Indiana, and Rev. Robert Morgan of Tampa, Florida. Rev. Morgan served as founding chairman and Rev. Konkle as founding vice-chairman.

== History ==
GAAAP originally began as a ministerial fellowship, growing from only 2 founding ministers in the beginning of 2007 to 17 ministers by early 2008. In 2010 the organization amended its constitution to become a denomination of twenty congregations.

In November 2010, a number of its ministers left the organization due to philosophical differences on cultural and social issues irreconcilable with the leadership. Ultimately, GAAAP was turned over to Rev. Joseph Parramore who presides over the New Journey Fellowship located in Florida.

=== Merger ===
The movement to create LGBT-affirming Apostolic or Oneness Pentecostal churches began in 1980 in the city of Schenectady, New York. The founder of the affirming Apostolic Pentecostal movement, Reverend William H. Carey, envisioned an international network of affirming Oneness Pentecostal churches, including the more fundamentalist theology inherent with such churches. He began what was known as the National Gay Pentecostal Alliance (NGPA). The organization opened its first church in Omaha, Nebraska in 1981. The first three ministers were Carey, E. Samuel Stafford, and Frances Cervantes. Later in 1983, the Reverend Sandy Lewis, District Elder, and Reverend Phildora Prigmore came into the NGPA organization in Tucson, Az to further the movement.

Although NGPA was an Apostolic (Oneness) Pentecostal organization, due to the lack of affirming Trinitarian Pentecostal churches, NGPA originally welcomed all affirming Pentecostals to belong to their churches. Once Trinitarian Pentecostals began to organize their own churches, NGPA became fully Oneness Pentecostal.

The Apostolic Intercessory Ministries (AIM) was formed in 1998 by Rev. Sandy Lewis, Rev. Phildora Prigmore, and Rev. Donald Rollins. This offshoot of the NGPA was organized to help establish new churches.

In August 2003, AIM officially joined with the NGPA under the new name Apostolic Restoration Mission (ARM). AIM retained its name as a discrete mission within the ARM organization. Rev. Elliott Prigmore Lewis (formerly Rev. Sandy Lewis) and Rev. Phildora Prigmore Lewis continued with ARM.

In March 2010, ARM merged with GAAAP under the GAAAP name. At their 2011 annual conference, the alliance reformed under a new Constitution and Bylaws and consecrated their first Presiding Bishop and Assistant Bishop.

=== AIM ===
Since Rev. William H. Carey founded the Oneness Pentecostal Apostolic Institute of Ministry in 1981, students from across the United States and around the world have been enrolled in his classes. Rev. Elliott Prigmore Lewis (formerly Rev. Sandy Lewis) and Rev. Phildora Prigmore Lewis continued to assist and teach Rev. William Carey’s program until 2014. Now called Affirming Institutes of Ministry, for ministers, future ministers, and students of the Word under Rev. Gem Embrey.

== Theological views ==
The church is non-trinitarian in theology, holding to the belief that all the fullness of God resides bodily in Jesus, and teaches that repentance, water baptism by immersion in the name of Jesus Christ, and the Baptism of the Holy Ghost are essential elements of the Apostolic era church that must be retained in the church of God today. They also believe that speaking in tongues is the initial physical evidence of the baptism of the Holy Ghost. GAAAP also considers itself a middle way between mainstream Christianity.

== See also ==
- Oneness Pentecostals
