= Evangelical-Reformed Church of Appenzell =

The Evangelical-Reformed Church of Appenzell is a Reformed state church in Appenzell, Switzerland. In 2004, it had 30,151 members, 20 parishes, and 26 house fellowships, served by 21 pastors. It is a member of the Federation of Swiss Protestant Churches. The church can be found all over Appenzell. Women's ordination is allowed.
