= German Evangelical Reformed Church =

Church in Jasper County, Iowa, US

- U.S. National Register of Historic Places
- Location within Iowa Location within the United States
- Location: North of Newton, Iowa
- Coordinates: 41°49′11″N 93°01′17″W
- Area: 3.5 acres (1.4 ha)
- Built: 1892
- NRHP reference No.: 79000902
- Added to NRHP: March 7, 1979

German Evangelical Reformed Church, also known as the Zoar Church, is a historic church located north of Newton, Iowa, United States. The congregation was established in 1876 by German immigrants, many of whom settled here in the late 1860s after first living in Freeport, Illinois. They built a small frame church on this property soon after, and the first burial in the cemetery behind the church building occurred in 1877. The present frame church was built by members of the congregation in 1892. It features a bell tower in the northeast corner, a gable roof, and a rock-faced stone foundation. Both the gablets on the tower and the front gable feature scalloped shingling. The entryway on the west side of the church was added in 1961. The house to the east of the church was the parsonage, which was sold in 1957. The church and cemetery were listed on the National Register of Historic Places in 1979.

It was demolished in 2023.
