= Church order =

Bylaws of a Christian church

Church order is the systematically organized set of rules drawn up by a qualified body of a local church. From the point of view of civil law, the church order can be described as the internal law of the church. A church order explains precisely what a document is, in a clinical and matter of fact tone, without conveying the spiritual nature of the document.

== Authority ==
The authority of a church order is very closely linked to its relationship to Scriptures and the confessional texts of a church. The fact that a church order provision is supported directly or indirectly by the Scriptures will to some degree, though not essentially, affect its authority.

== Evolution ==
The British biblical scholar, B. H. Streeter identifies the Johannine epistles as the culmination of the New Testament understanding of church order with the author of Third Epistle of John confronting a serious matter as an official with recognized authority and experience who calls himself an 'Elder' yet functions more like an Archbishop of later development.

== Denominations and alliances with church orders ==
Many denominations have church orders that regulate the doctrines and practices of the church. Some church orders are also found in alliances or fellowships: Here are some sample church organizations that have church orders:

- Presbyterian Church in America
- Christian Reformed Church in America
- Reformed Church in America
- Presbyterian (USA)
- Christian Leaders Alliance
- Church of the Brethren

== See also ==
- Ancient church orders
- Book of Discipline
- Code of conduct
- Convention (norm)
- Lifeway
- Magisterium
- Moral authority
- Morality
- Moral relativism
- Ordnung
- Religious law
- Sacred tradition
- Social norm
- Social order
