= Evangelical Reformed Church of the Canton of St. Gallen =

German Reformed Church

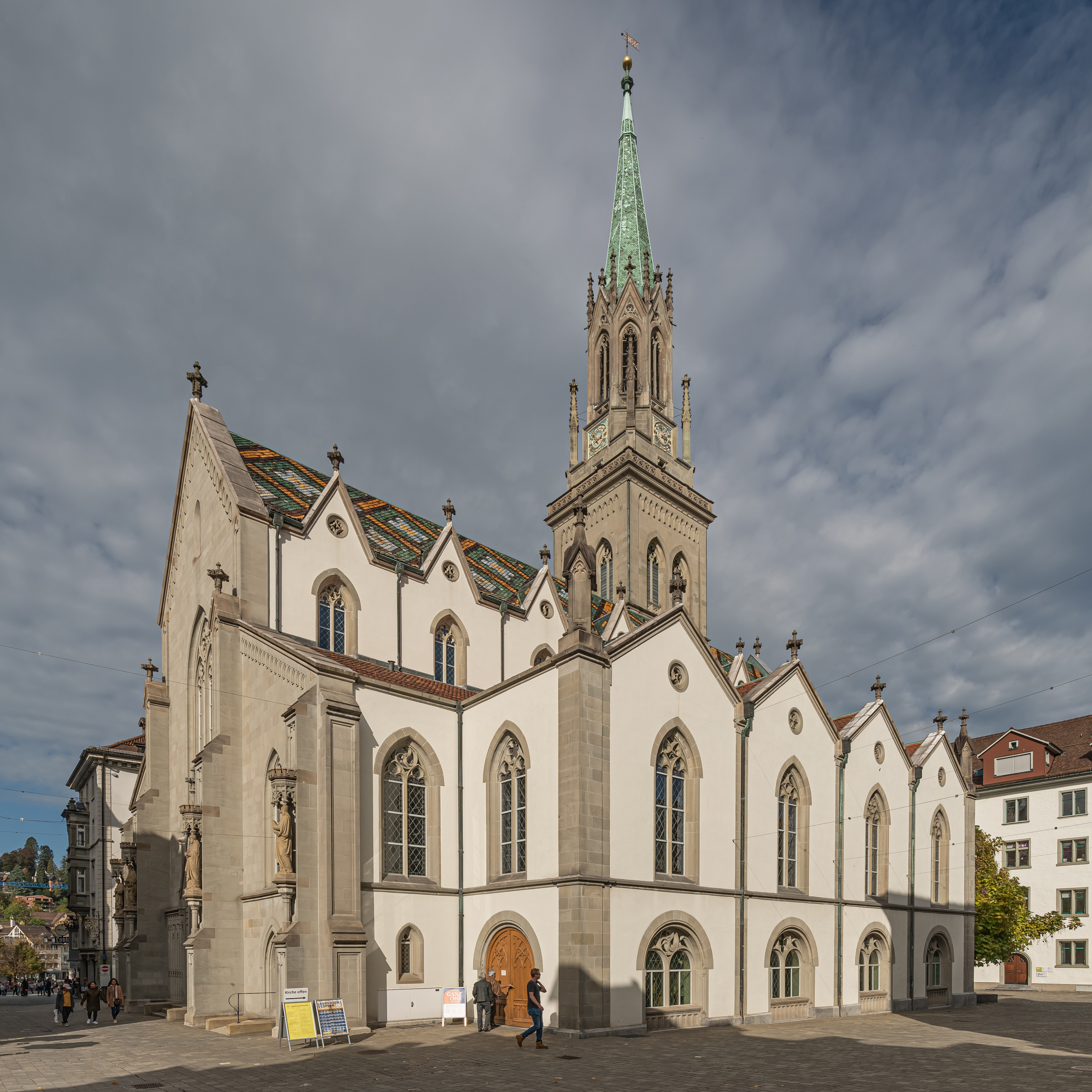
The Church of St. Laurence in St. Gallen.

The Evangelical-Reformed Church of the Canton of St. Gallen is a Reformed state cantonal church in the canton of St. Gallen.

The church was founded in 1803. In 2004, it had 122,500 members and 55 congregations served by 120 pastors. Congregations are in St. Gallen, Goldach, Rorschach, Gossau, Gaiserwald, Thal-Lutzenberg, Rheineck, St. Marghrete, Balbach, Marbach, Rebstein, Altstätten, Salez-Haag, Uznach, Sevelen, Eichberg, Sax-Frümsen, Wil, Krinau, Flavil and others in St. Gallen. The Church has links with the Evangelical Church in Liechtenstein.

The headquarters of the church are in St. Gallen, Toggenburg and Rheintal. The church has Presbyterian-Synodal church government.

It is a member of the Federation of Swiss Protestant Churches. Women's ordination is allowed. Blessing of same-sex unions is allowed.
