= Evangelical-Reformed Church of Uri =

The Evangelical-Reformed Church of Uri is a Reformed state cantonal church in the canton of Uri.

== History ==
By the end of 2002, the Uri Church was a member of the Evangelical Reformed Church Association of Central Switzerland. This broke up on 1 January 2003. The newly formed independent Reformed cantonal churches were members of the Federation of Swiss Protestant Churches.

== Origins ==
The presence of Protestants in Uri is closely linked to the construction of the Gotthard railway line in 1882. This led to the influx of many Reformed families of workers and engineers who began to organize Protestant auxiliary associations.

== Organization ==
=== Parishes ===
Since its inception the cantonal church comprised three parishes:

- Altdorf and surroundings
- Erstfeld and Urner Oberland
- Ursern with Andermatt, Hospental and Realp and the situated on the top Reusstal Göschenen

In the spring meeting of the Reformed Church on 19 May 2014, a new organizational statute was adopted which provides the fusion of the three traditional parishes into one.

== Churches ==
The church council as the executive of the state church consists of 9 members and is chaired by Dieter Kolthoff (as of 2013). Women's ordination is allowed.
