= Evangelical Reformed Presbyterian Church =

- Classification: Protestant
- Orientation: Reformed
- Theology: Calvinist Evangelical
- Polity: Presbyterian
- Region: United States
- Origin: 2006
- Separated from: Presbyterian Church in America and Orthodox Presbyterian Church
- Congregations: 6 (2015)

The Evangelical Reformed Presbyterian Church (ERPC) was a Presbyterian denomination, formed in 2006, by churches that separated from the Presbyterian Church in America and Orthodox Presbyterian Church, on the charge that both denominations would be tolerant of the Federal Vision of Covenant Theology.

In 2015 the denomination dissolved and its churches became independent.

== History ==
The Presbyterian churches originate from the Protestant Reformation of the 16th century. They are the Protestant churches that adhere to Reformed theology and whose form of ecclesiastical organization is characterized by the government of an assembly of elders. Presbyterian Government is common in Protestant churches that were modeled after the Protestant Reformation in Switzerland, notably in Switzerland, Scotland, Netherlands, France and portions of Prussia, of Ireland and, later, of the United States.

In 2006, a group of churches split from the Presbyterian Church in America and Orthodox Presbyterian Church, on the charge that both denominations would be tolerant of the Federal Vision of Covenant Theology. Together these churches constituted the Evangelical Reformed Presbyterian Church.

The denomination reached 6 churches in 2015. However, in October of the same year the IPRE was dissolved and its churches became independent since then.

== Doctrine ==
The denomination subscribed to the Westminster Confession of Faith, Westminster Larger Catechism and Westminster Shorter Catechism.
