= Evangelical Reformed Church in Portugal =

The Nederduitse Gereformeerde Kerk initiated mission work among Portuguese-speaking refugees from Angola and Mozambique in South Africa. The work was led by Reverend (later, Doctor) Arnoldus Petrus Pienaar, Rev. Mario Alves, Rev. Pietar Botha, Rev. Eber Cezar, Rev. Samuel Coelho, Rev. Kruger du Perez, and Rev. Hermanus Taute. They established five Portuguese-speaking congregations. Some members began returning to Portugal, their land of origin, but at that time, no Reformed Church had been established there. Reverend Petrus (Pine) Pienaar and later Reverend Mario Alves began visiting Portugal annually. In 1983, Reverend Pienaar settled in Portugal. These efforts led to the formation of two autonomous congregations, known as the Reformed Church in Portugal. The first congregation was founded in Porto with 50 members on October 16, 1985, serving the northern part of the country, and the second was founded on October 26, 1985, in Lisbon to serve the central region. These churches formed a Synod. In 2005, Pastor Hermanus (Manie) Taute arrived to lead the Reformed Movement in Portugal.
