= Evangelical Reformed Church in Valais =

Reformed cantonal State church in Valais

The Evangelical Reformed Church in Valais or in French the Église réformée évangélique du Valais or Evangelisch-Reformierte Kirche des Wallis is a Reformed cantonal State church in Valais.

It has 12 parishes and 17 ministers, representing more than 20,000 members, but the number is increasing, because of the move of the Reformed people to the canton from other Swiss cantons. It has 12 congregations in the Canton, in Brig, Visp, Leukerbad, Sierre, Crans-Montana, Sion, Coude Rhone Martigny-Saxon, 2 Rivers, Monthey, and Haut-Lac. Women's ordination is allowed.
