= European institutions in Strasbourg =

Coordinates: 48.5961°N 7.7715°E

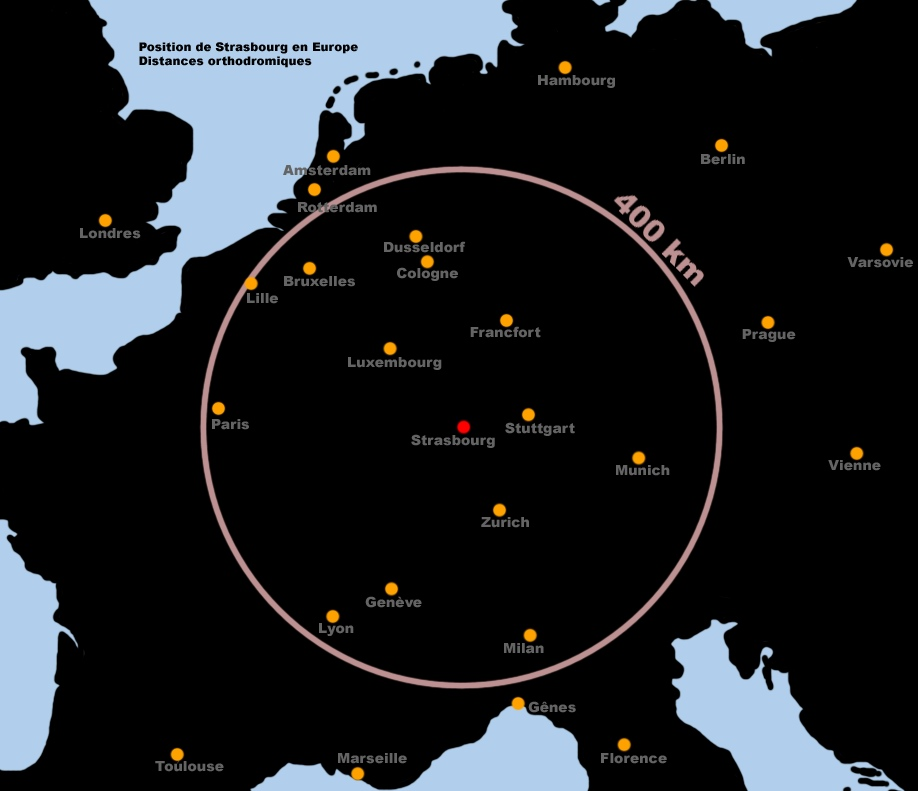
Strasbourg (red dot) shown in relation to nearby European cities (circle shows 400 km distance)

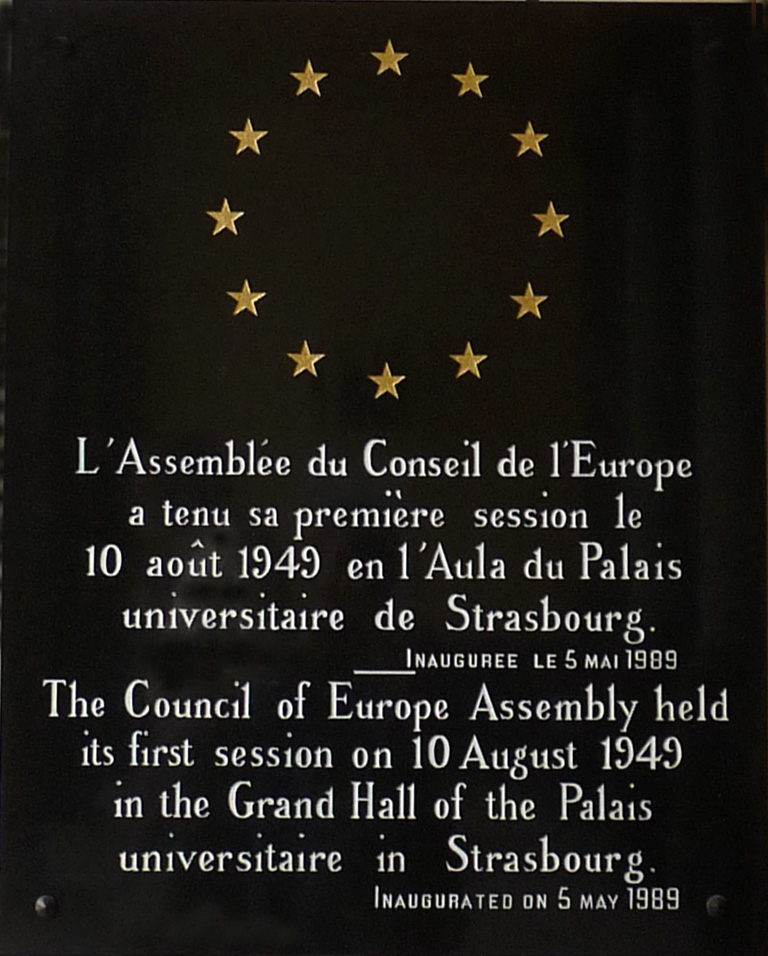
Plaque commemorating the first session of the Council of Europe Assembly in the grand aula of Strasbourg University

There are a range of European institutions in Strasbourg (France), the oldest of which dates back to 1815. In all, there are more than twenty different institutions, addressing European integration and prosperity, based in the Alsatian city. Many are located in what is known as the European Quarter of the city.

== Area ==
The European Quarter is spread over an area covering the districts of Wacken, Orangerie and Robertsau in the north-west of the city and comprising the intersection of the River Ill and the Marne-Rhine Canal. The first specific European building in the area was the Council of Europe's House of Europe in 1949, with the Rhine Commission being located towards the centre of the city. The Audiovisual Observatory and the Institute for Human Rights are the only institutions in the quarter to have moved into pre-existing premises: a 1900 villa and an 18th-century former postal relay station and inn turned conventual building, respectively. The Arte headquarters, previously disseminated on several buildings across the town, were united in a single spacious building close to the Louise Weiss building in 2003.

November 2007 saw the extension of the Strasbourg tramway into the European Quarter, with the inauguration by European Parliament president Hans-Gert Pöttering, CoE Secretary general Terry Davis and Eurocorps Lieutenant General Pedro Pitarch of the Parlement européen, Droits de l'homme and Robertsau Boecklin tram stations. The newest Council of Europe buildings were inaugurated in 2006 and 2008, and the newest European Union building was inaugurated in 2017. In 2023, the French state bought a recently built office building opposite the Louise-Weiss building and started renting it to the European Parliament. On 21 November 2023, that new building of the EP was inaugurated by French Prime minister Élisabeth Borne and EP president Roberta Metsola, and named after former EP president, Simone Veil.

In all, there are fifteen different buildings in the European Quarter: seven belonging to the Council of Europe, six belonging (or rented by) to the European Union, plus Arte and the IIHR.

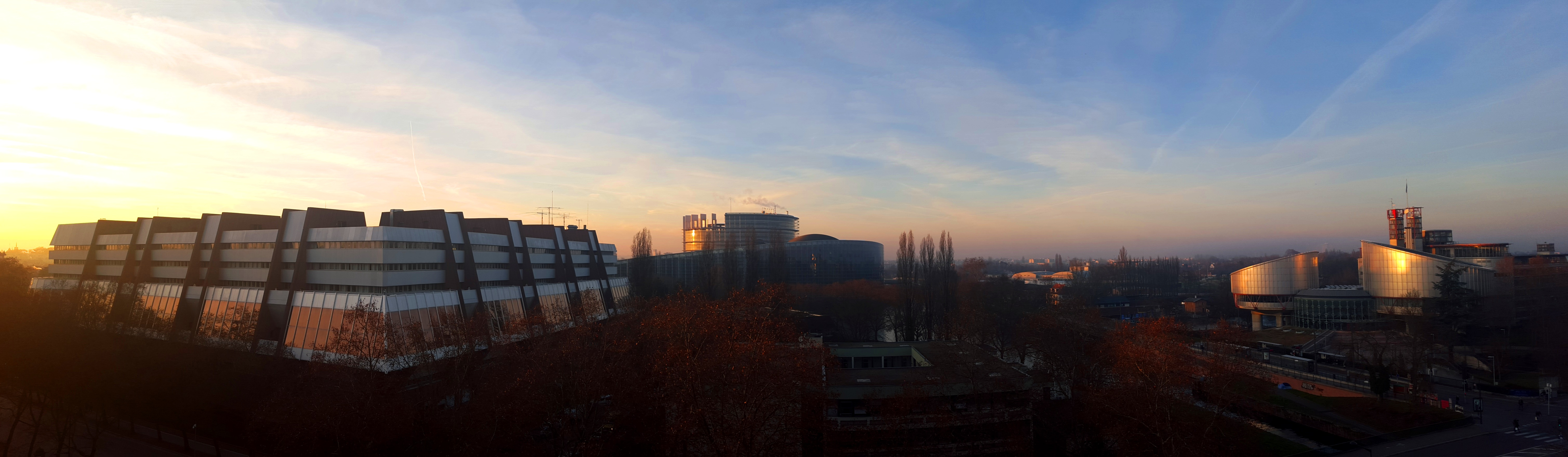
European institutions in Strasbourg

== History and institutions ==
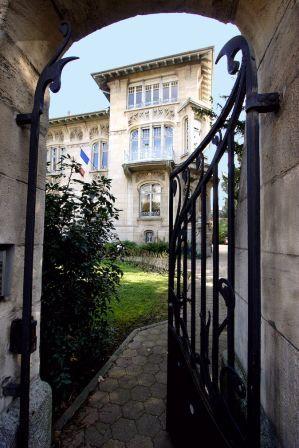
The villa Schutzenberger is a 19th-century building which has become the seat of the European Audiovisual Observatory.

The first European institution to be based in the city was the Central Commission for Navigation on the Rhine. Set up in 1815 by the Congress of Vienna, it is the oldest international organisation in the world but has only been based in Strasbourg since 1920 (headquarters located in the Palais du Rhin). Its function is to encourage European prosperity by guaranteeing a high level of security for navigation of the Rhine and environs.

However the bulk of the European presence in Strasbourg comes from the post-Second World War establishment of institutions. The move towards European integration pushed for the creation of new bodies. The first of these to be established was the International Commission on Civil Status, founded in 1948 and predating the Council of Europe by a few months. The progressive establishment of a peaceful, unified and prosperous Europe then followed through the founding of the Council of Europe, and its related bodies (such as the European Court of Human Rights), as well as the European Coal and Steel Community (later the European Union). Both the Council of Europe and the European Union increasingly work together, notably to enforce the Council of Europe's European Convention on Human Rights.

One of the main impulses of making Strasbourg into the seat of numerous European institutions came from British Foreign Minister Ernest Bevin, one of whose closest advisors had a daughter who had studied in the city. While Bevin publicly acknowledged that the multi-cultural, multi-confessional aspect of the city as well as its geographic situation in the heart of (western) Europe were the criteria on which it was chosen, he privately gave a completely different reason: "Strasbourg? Perfect, no one will go there."

=== Council of Europe ===
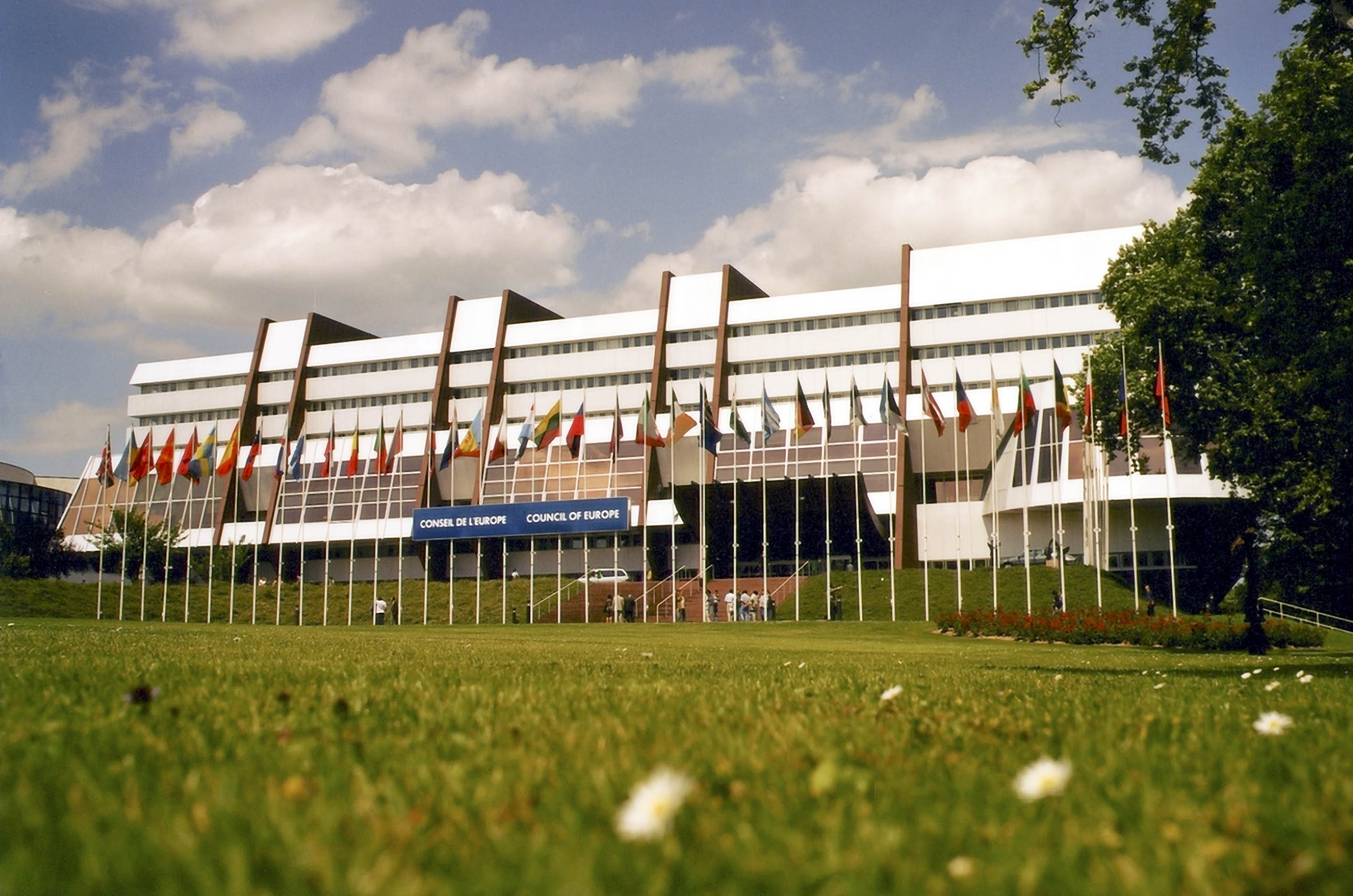
The Palace of Europe

The Council of Europe has eight buildings in the district; its main building used to be shared with the European Parliament. The first building to be completed was the House of Europe, inaugurated in 1950 but torn down in 1977 when it was replaced by the current Palace of Europe.

The Palace of Europe and the Art Nouveau Villa Schutzenberger (built 1897–1900, seat of the European Audiovisual Observatory) are located in the Orangerie district, the European Youth Centre is located in the Wacken district and the European Court of Human Rights building (built 1989–1995), the European Directorate for the Quality of Medicines (inaugurated in 2006) and the Agora building (the General Office Building) are situated in the Robertsau district. The Agora building has been voted "best international business center real estate project of 2007" (on 13 March 2008 at MIPIM 2008) and marked the provisional end of new building by the Council of Europe (Agora was officially inaugurated on 17 April 2008 by French minister for Foreign Affairs Bernard Kouchner).

Due to persistent budgetary shortages, it was reported in 2010 that the Council of Europe was expected to cut down significantly the number of its activities, and thus the number of its employees, from 2011 onwards. This was expected to notably affect the economy of the city of Strasbourg.

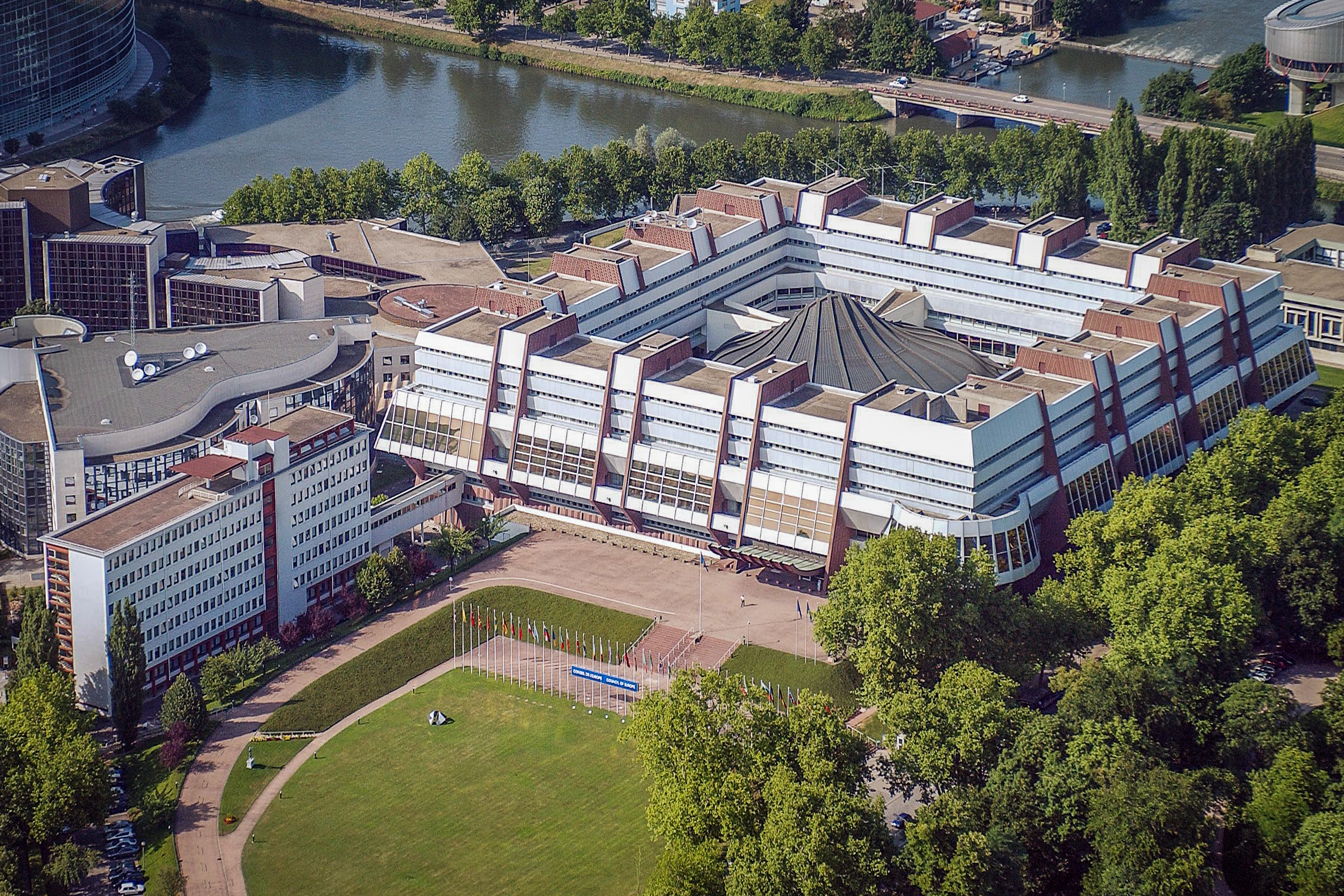
Picture taken in 2008. Left side, European Parliament buildings (top to bottom); Louise Weiss, Winston Churchill, Pierre Pflimlin, Václav Havel (then Building B of the Council of Europe). Council of Europe buildings (centre to top right); Palace of Europe, Bâtiment D, European Court of Human Rights.

=== European Parliament ===
The European Parliament has six buildings in the quarter. It previously used the hemicycle of the Council of Europe to hold its meetings until 1999 when it completed its main building, the Louise Weiss building, across the river from the Palace of Europe. It is connected by a bridge to its older office buildings, Pierre Pflimlin, Winston Churchill and Salvador de Madariaga, which are spread out in a broad half circle around the Palace of Europe.

The Václav Havel building, inaugurated on 5 July 2017, was originally built in 1955 for the Council of Europe, which used it as "Building B" until 2007. In 2012, it was bought by the European Parliament, which renovated it thoroughly, completely transforming its appearance.

==== Controversy ====
The location of Parliament has caused some controversy, as its work takes place not only in Strasbourg but also in Brussels and Luxembourg City. The split arrangement has caused financial, environmental and practical difficulties, with the Strasbourg location usually (though not universally) being cited as the extraneous location rather than Brussels.

=== European studies ===
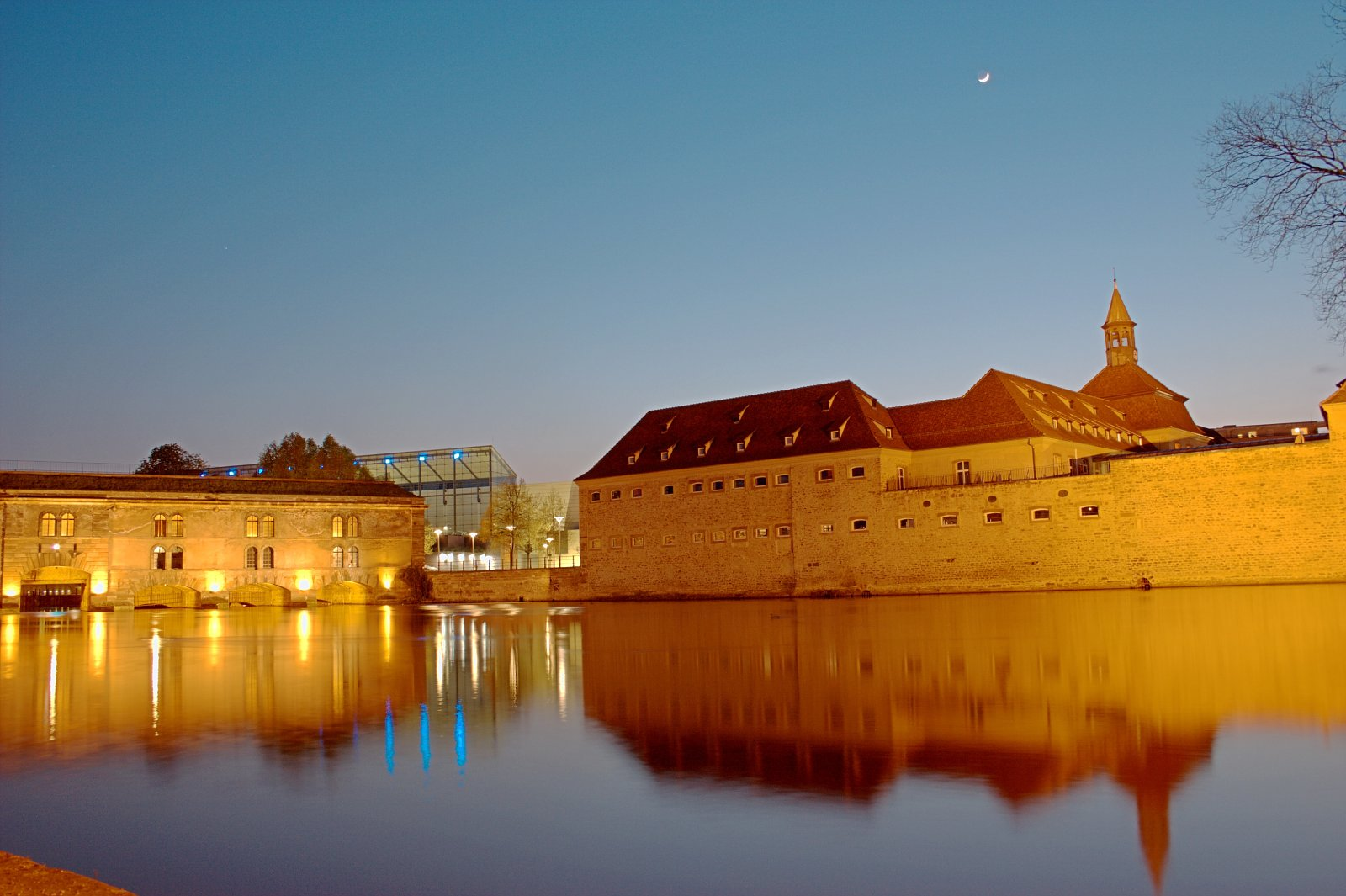
The ENA building (right) in a former monastery then prison by twilight

The École nationale d'administration, founded in 1945 in Paris, was moved to Strasbourg by decree in 1991 and permanently established there in 2005 (although the headquarters had been transferred from the start, the students had to spend half of their annual curricula in either city until that date). In the course of its refocusing on European governance, it merged with the Centre d'études européennes de Strasbourg (Center for European Studies, CEES) of the University of Strasbourg and subtitled itself École européenne de gouvernance (European Governance School).

Another related academic institution is the Institut des hautes études européennes (IHEE), located in the Art Nouveau former Villa Knopf (built 1903–1905), close to the Parliament and the CoE. This school was founded in 1953 and was then called Centre universitaire des hautes études européennes (University Center for higher European Studies).

=== Accredited European School ===
The European School of Strasbourg was inaugurated by French education minister Xavier Darcos on 4 September 2008. It is the first of the Accredited European Schools, offering the European Baccalaureate as its secondary leaving qualification, to have been established in France.

=== Information relays ===
Strasbourg also serves as the seat of diverse information relays of the European Union, such as the Information Centre on European Institutions (CIIE), the Euro-Info Centre (EIC), the MEDIA Antenna and the European Documentation Centre (EDC) as well as the European Job Mobility Portal, the EURES network. The city also hosted the automated computerised network Schengen Information System and currently hosts the central unit of its new version, the Schengen Information System II, a back-up unit being located in Austria.

=== Other bodies ===
Other bodies based in the city, most of them unrelated either to the Council of Europe or the European Union but working in more or less close association with them, are: International Commission on Civil Status, Eurocorps (created in 1993), the International Institute of Human Rights (founded in 1969), the European Science Foundation (founded in 1974), EuroScience (founded in 1997), the Assembly of European Regions (established in 1985) and the Human Frontier Science Program (conceived in 1986, launched in 1989). Strasbourg is also, since its inception in 1991, the main seat of the Franco-German television channel Arte. Starting from its establishing date on 1 December 2012, also the new European Agency for the operational management of large-scale IT systems in the area of freedom, security and justice (eu-LISA) has his operational HQ in Strasbourg.

Finally, Strasbourg also hosts the association Apollonia (created in 1998), which defines itself as "a platform of cooperation in the area of the visual arts between European countries and, more specifically, with the countries of Central and Eastern Europe, the Balkans, the countries along the Baltic Sea and in the South Caucasus." The association was created on the basis of work conducted since 1994 by the Council of Europe within the framework of the Program of European Artistic Exchanges.

== Political status ==
Twenty institutions have their sole seat, or one of their main seats, in Strasbourg. Due to this concentration in such a small area, Strasbourg, like Brussels, claims the title of "capital of Europe". While Brussels is the capital city of the trilingual state of Belgium, Strasbourg has had long periods of rule by both France or Germany, assimilating both of their cultures and languages (it also has the Alsatian language). Strasbourg also has the distinction of being one of only four cities to host major international institutions without being a capital (the others being New York City, Geneva and The Hague).

Brussels claims the title of "Capital of Europe" in reference to the European Union, while Strasbourg (with the Council of Europe) refers to the continent as a whole. In regards to the European Union, Strasbourg sometimes claims to be the 'democratic' or 'legislative' capital (due to the presence of the Parliament) while classing Brussels as the 'administrative' or 'executive' capital (due to the presence of the European Commission and Council in that city).

In 2005, the urban area of Greater Strasbourg formed a small political community (known as the Strasbourg-Ortenau Eurodistrict) consisting of some common administration with its neighbouring German Ortenau district in Baden-Württemberg on the opposite side of the Rhine. The combined population of this district was 868,000 as of 2006 and there are plans to extend the Strasbourg trams across the Rhine into these areas.

== See also ==
- Brussels and the European Union
