= Trinational Eurodistrict of Basel =

International metropolitan area

- Legal Form: Association according to local French law
- Location: Village-Neuf, France
- Formation: January 26, 2007; 19 years ago
- Presidium: Mike Keller, municipal president of Binningen, Marion Dammann, district administrator of Lörrach, Jean-Marc Deichtmann, mayor of Huningue
- Website: https://www.eurodistrictbasel.eu
- Languages: French / German

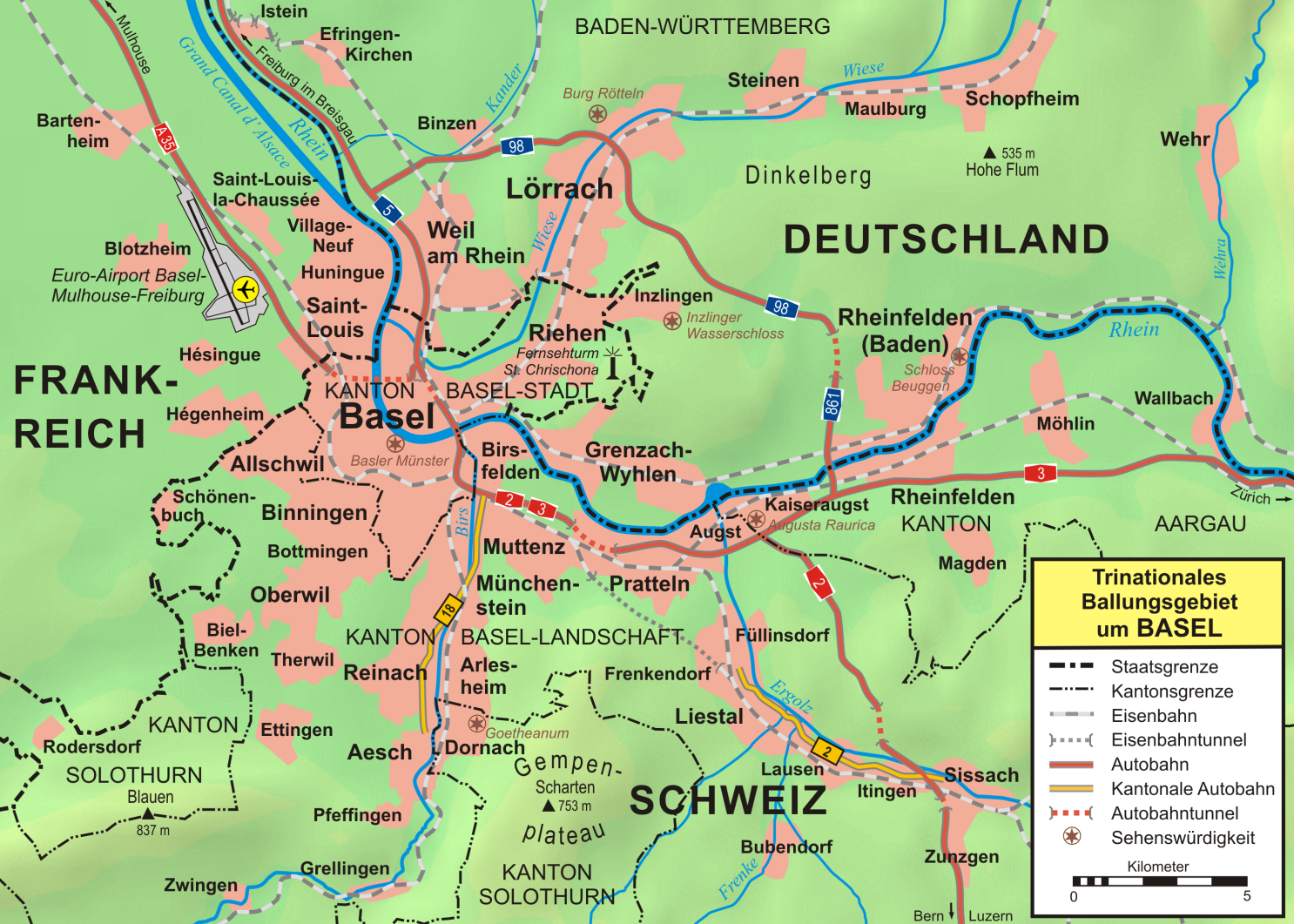
Basel metropolitan area (Frankreich means France, Deutschland means Germany, and Schweiz means Switzerland)

The Trinational Eurodistrict of Basel, or Basel metropolitan area, extends across three countries: Switzerland, France and Germany. The Trinational Eurodistrict of Basel (German: Trinationaler Eurodistrict Basel (TEB)/ French: Eurodistrict trinational de Bâle (ETB)) is an organization of municipalities and cities in the trinational surroundings of Basel. The TEB acts as coordinator for cross-border projects between the German, French and Swiss cities around Basel and promotes the cultural and linguistic exchange between the people living in the region. This very close cooperation and coordination is necessary as the national borders run through a densely built area. The TEB forms an extension of the Trinational Agglomeration Basel (German: Trinationale Agglomeration Basel (TAB)/French: Agglomération Trinationale de Bâle (ATB)).

The TEB has approximately 830,000 inhabitants. with 60% in Switzerland, 30% in Germany and 10% in France. It consists of:

- In Switzerland:
  - Basel-Stadt and Basel-Landschaft cantons
  - in the Canton of Solothurn the Thierstein District, Dorneck District and the Forum Regio Plus
  - in Aargau canton the municipalities of the Fricktal planning region
- In France:
  - The 40 communes of the communauté d'agglomération Saint-Louis Agglomération, including Saint-Louis
- In Germany:
  - the Lörrach district
  - in the Waldshut district the cities Wehr and Bad Säckingen

== History ==
Cross-border cooperation has a long tradition in the Upper Rhine Valley. The inhabitants of the region have always interacted across the currently known borders. These frequent economic and social interactions across borders also made cooperation on an administrative level increasingly necessary.

During the 19th century however, the amount of cross-border cooperation in the region decreased significantly. The reasons for this can be found in the growing nationalism and outbreak of the Franco-Prussian War. The outbreak of the First World War, which lead to the enforcement of the borders, worsened the situation additionally. During both world wars, trade on a local level was still going, but an administrative cooperation on a subnational level seemed impossible.

=== Institutionalization after the world wars ===
The cross-border cooperation was taken up again as soon as possible after the end of the Second World War. One of the first big achievements was the opening of the airport "EuroAirport Basel Mulhouse Freiburg" in 1946. In the years following the Second World War, the cooperation happened mainly on a sectoral and informal level.

The creation of the association Regio Basiliensis in 1963 and the Regio du Haut-Rhin in 1965 were proof that the efforts of institutionalizing the cross-border cooperation in the region started to bear fruits. Anyhow, the informal character of this cooperation was critically observed by the nation-states. The three governments therefore decided to institutionalize the cooperation. This was officially achieved with the ratification of the treaty of Bonn on 22 October 1975.

=== Introduction of the Interreg program ===
As a part of its European territorial cooperation, the European Union started implementing the Interreg program in 1989. This gave a considerable boost to the efforts put in new projects. In the first three periods of the program, the region of the upper-rhine was split into different regional Interreg-programs, PAMINA for the northern part and Oberrhein Mitte-Süd (german for upper-Rhine mid-south) for the southern part. Since 2007, both regions are subject of the same Interreg program, Interreg Oberrhein. Since its implementation, the program allows promoters of projects to receive funds from the European Union.

=== The conference of the Upper-Rhine ===
Almost simultaneously with the ratification of the treaty of Bonn in 1975, two regional committees were founded: The Comité bipartite for the northern part and the Comité tripartite for the southern part. However, in the following years the division proved to be increasingly ineffective. In 1991, the two committees merged and formed the German-French-Swiss Upper-Rhine conference. The legal status and its official role in the cross-border cooperation was finally established in the German-French-Swiss treaty of Basel in 2000.

=== The founding of the trinational agglomeration of Basel ===
After a meeting between politicians, city-planning officials, and business representatives from Alsace, Baden-Württemberg and northwestern Switzerland, a development strategy for the so-called trinational agglomeration of Basel (TAB) was developed. The concept contained sectoral goals, which were worked towards by implementing projects in the topics settlement, traffic, economy, nature and environment, infrastructure, and political structure. With the establishment of the TAB in 2003, the first coordinated strategy for spatial-planning in a trinational region was formed.

=== The Eurodistricts ===
In 2003, on the occasion of the 40th anniversary of the Élysée Treaty, Chancellor of Germany Gerhard Schröder and President of France Jacques Chirac, proposed the creation of the Strasbourg-Ortenau Eurodistrict. This proposal created a dynamic. Just one year after the founding of the Eurodistrict Strasbourg-Ortenau in 2005, the Eurodistrict of the Region Freiburg / Centre Alsace was founded.

The interest to create a Eurodistrict in the region of Basel was already expressed during the planning of the Eurodistrict Strasbourg-Ortenau. The aim was to further develop the structures of the TAB. To achieve this, a project outline was developed by a trinational steering committee in cooperation with Regio Basiliensis and the TAB association. The idea first had to be ratified by the individual entities, before the foundation agreement could be signed. The foundation agreement of the Trinational Eurodistrict of Basel was finally signed on 26 January 2007 in the French city Saint-Louis.

== Structure ==
The TEB is an association according to local French Law. It consists of different committees and bodies.

=== The general assembly ===
The general assembly consists of representatives from the different members. The members each send out one delegate to the assembly. Each delegate has one vote. The assembly is summoned once a year by the president of the TEB. The general assembly defines the orientation, goals and the programs of the association. Additionally, it sets the membership fees and adopts the annual accounting, annual report and the budget.

=== The board ===
The board of the TEB consists of each nine French, German and Swiss members. They are elected by the general meeting. The board decides upon the day-to-day business and the management of the association. Associate members and the president of the district council take part in the board meetings with a consultative voice. The meetings take place at least four times a year. The board is elected for a period of two years. Each mandate can be prolonged by reelection. To be allowed on the board, each member also needs to follow an electoral mandate within his territorial entity. Current president is Mike Keller, municipal president of Binningen.

=== The presidium ===
The presidium consists of one president and two vice-presidents. Each member of the presidium represents one of the three nations France, Germany and Switzerland. This prevents the association from following the particular interests of only one of the three countries. The president’s term of office is two years. The members take turns in this frequency.

The presidium coordinates the work of the TEB, defines the strategy and monitors the compliance with the articles of the association.

=== The administrative office ===
The administrative office represents the administration of the TEB. It supports the work of the board and of the president. The key tasks of the administrative office are the realization of board and presidium decisions, the development of projects, public relations work and the coordination of the work groups and expert groups.

=== The work groups ===
The decisions of the board in different topics are then prepared by the work groups. The work groups can then create new projects and form new partnerships. The TEB has the following working groups:

- Technical coordination group (consists of 24 administrative officials)
- Spatial planning and landscape
- Mobility and traffic
- Civil Society

=== The advisory board ===
The advisory board consists of 20 Swiss, 15 French and 15 German members. It meets twice a year. It is subdivided into six permanent commissions:

1. Commission for education, culture, youth, sports and identity
2. Commission for social affairs, health and research
3. Commission for environment, energy and agriculture
4. Commission for traffic
5. Commission for spatial planning
6. Commission for economy, labor market and tourism.

The advisory board can address the board by filing motions, give statements and draw up resolutions.

== Goals ==
The TEB names four superordinate goals:

- Strengthening the identity of the citizens with the trinational region
- Augmenting the citizens participation in topics of cross-border cooperation
- Expanding the cross-border cooperation
- Shaping a more attractive and livable common European living space

== Funding ==
The TEB is funded by annual membership fees and through European, national and local subsidies.

== Projects ==
The TEB accompanies various projects, from which some are made possible through the realization of multiple sub-level projects.

=== International building Exhibition Basel (IBA) ===
The international building exhibition Basel was created for the period of 2010 to 2020 on the initiative of the TEB by the TEB-members. The IBA supports the realization of cross-border projects with a focus on the topic "landscapes", "urban spaces" and "cohabitation". Examples for such projects are the construction of new parks, neighborhood meeting points and footpaths and cycle paths.

Through this work, the IBA pursues its goal of transferring approaches to create a coherent cross-border area from the strategic and political level to a practical level.

=== 3Land ===
To realize the project 3Land, partners from Switzerland, France and Germany have joined forces with the goal of coordinating the spatial planning of the cities Huningue, Weil am Rhein and Basel in the area between the bridges ‘Dreirosenbrücke’ and ‘Palmrainbrücke’.

The project is subdivided by three committees (political governance, overall project governance, overall project management) and three working groups (WG1: bridges / mobility / profitability, WG2: open spaces / initial uses, WG Communication).

The municipalities implement projects on a sublevel like the project Vis-à-Vis as a part of the larger project 3Land.

=== Vis-à-Vis ===
The project Vis-à-Vis will be one of the first projects to be implemented as a part of the project 3Land. It is a joint project of the cities Huningue and Weil am Rhein, which is carried by the TEB and co-funded by the European Regional Development Fund within the scope of the Interreg V upper Rhine program of the European Union.

The project Vis-à-Vis revolves around the creation and realization of a cross-border park on the opposite banks of the Rhine which belong to the cities Huningue and Weil am Rhein. The two parts of the park will be built on the height of the Bridge "Dreiländerbrücke" which connects the two areas.

=== Trois pays à Vélo ===
The goal of the project "Trois pays à Vélo" is to promote cycling tourism in the trinational region. Information panels, maps and a website will promote and facilitate the use of cross-border cycling routes. Partners from all three countries are involved in the realization of the project. The project is subsidized by the European Regional Development fund within the scope of the Interreg V Upper Rhine program of the European Union and by the New Regional Policy of Switzerland.

=== Parc des Carrières ===
The IBA-project "Parc des Carrières" consists of creating a park on the area between the cities Basel, Allschwil, Hégenheim and Saint Louis. The area is currently used for gravel extraction. The areas that are not used for this purpose anymore will be transformed into ecological green spaces and connected by footpaths and cycling paths. Multiple Swiss and French municipalities and organizations collaborate during this project.

== Funding instruments ==
The TEB possesses multiple funding instruments. The purpose of these instruments is to fund civil projects that promote intercultural exchange between the inhabitants of the trinational region.

=== Fund for encounters ===
Through the fund for encounters, the TEB funds projects, which promote an exchange between the inhabitants of the trinational region. Such projects are, for example, sports events, concerts or theatrical performances.

=== Fund for class encounters ===
The fund for class encounters has a similar purpose to the fund for encounters, but focuses on pupils. It promotes the exchange between French and German-speaking pupils from the three countries.

=== EU-funded small projects ===
Through its Interreg program, the European Union funds small cross-border projects with a maximal sum of 40'000€. To receive this funding, the lead partners of the projects have to follow multiple guidelines and procedures. The TEB accompanies them through this process to facilitate their work.

=== Globetrotter ===
Through the project "Globetrotter" the Eurodistricts Pamina, Strasbourg-Ortenau, Region Freiburg / Centre et Sud Alsace and the Trinational Eurodistrict of Basel follow the goal of enhancing the knowledge of the region of pupils. By using an online game, the pupils can start a virtual journey through the Eurodistricts. At different sites, questions about the region can be answered.

Classes have the opportunity to meet at one of these sites and formulate new questions for the game. These encounters can also receive funding by the TEB.

== Associated projects ==
The TEB can also be a partner in projects that outstretch its perimeter.

=== Atmo-Vision ===
The project Atmo-Vision aims to improve the quality of air in the upper-Rhine region. To do this, tools, criteria and proposals for actions are created for the institutions and administrations in the perimeter of the project. They should help to record emissions and reduce them in the future.

Multiple partners from all three countries have come together to implement this project.
