= Roland Ries =

French politician

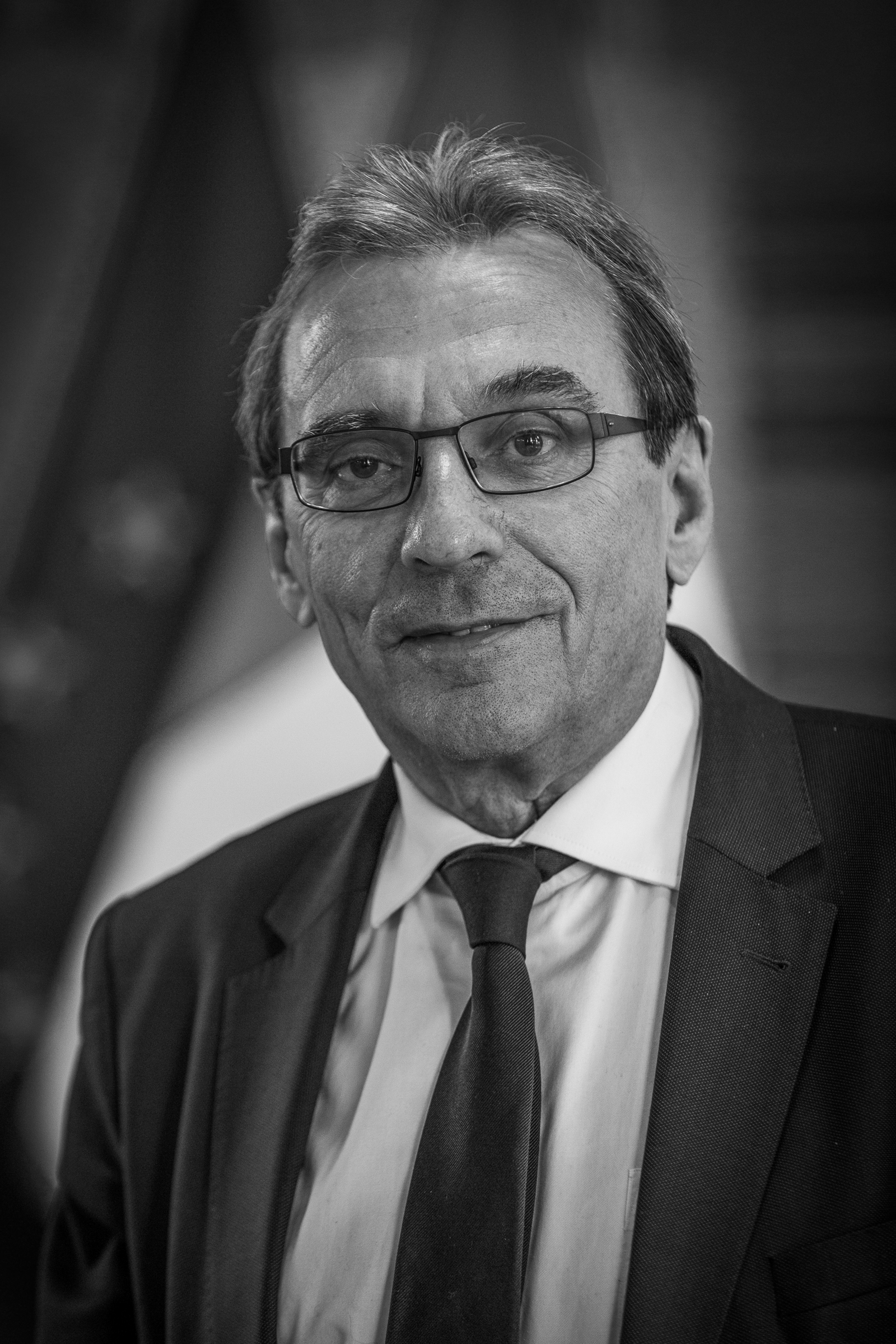
- Roland Ries in 2016

Mayor of Strasbourg
- In office 22 March 2008 – 4 July 2020
- Preceded by: Fabienne Keller
- Succeeded by: Jeanne Barseghian
- In office 27 June 1997 – 25 June 2000
- Preceded by: Catherine Trautmann
- Succeeded by: Catherine Trautmann

Personal details
- Born: 11 January 1945 (age 81) Niederlauterbach, France
- Party: Socialist Party
- Education: University of Strasbourg

Roland Ries (born 11 January 1945) is a French politician from Alsace who has held several posts on local, regional and national level between 1997 and 2020.

A member of the Socialist Party and mayor of Strasbourg between 2008 and 2020 Ries also serves as the first President of the Strasbourg-Ortenau Eurodistrict's Council since 2010. Ries had already been the mayor of Strasbourg (and the President of the Urban Community of Strasbourg) between June 1997 and January 2000, filling in for Catherine Trautmann (whose deputy he had been since 1989) after she had become Minister of Culture and Communication in the government of Lionel Jospin.

Ries has furthermore been a Member of the Senate of France for the Bas-Rhin department between September and November 2004 and is again a Member since February 2005. Since 24 September 2008, Roland Ries is the president of the Association TGV Est-Européen. and was elected a member of the board of directors of the SNCF for a period of five years starting on 8 March 2013. Additionally, he served as the chairman of the Groupement des autorités responsables de transport (GART) from September 2008 until September 2014 and was elected president of the network of French cities Cités unies France in July 2014, for a duration of two years.

== Political career ==
Member of the French Economic and Social Council : 2001-2003.

Electoral mandates

Senate of France

Senator of Bas-Rhin : Since 2004. Elected in 2004.

Regional council

Regional councillor of Alsace : 1996-2004 (Resignation). Reelected in 1998, 2004.

Urban Community council

President of the Urban Community of Strasbourg : 1997-2001.

1st vice-président of the Urban Community of Strasbourg : Since 2008.

Vice-président of the Urban Community of Strasbourg : 1989-1997. Reelected in 1995.

Member of the Urban Community of Strasbourg : Since 1989. Reelected in 1995, 2001, 2008.

Municipal council

Mayor of Strasbourg : 1997-2000 / Since 2008. Reelected in 2008, 2014.

1st deputy-mayor of Strasbourg : 1989-1997. Reelected in 1995.

Municipal councillor of Strasbourg : Since 1983. Reelected in 1989, 1995, 2001, 2008.

Eurodistrict council

President of the Strasbourg-Ortenau Eurodistrict : since 2010
