= Stapelrecht =

Medieval European trader requirement

Stapelrecht, or staple right, was a medieval privilege granted to certain cities in the Holy Roman Empire allowing them to require passing merchants to unload and offer their goods for sale locally, fostering urban prosperity but often hindering long-distance trade.

Staple rights can be compared to Marktrecht (market rights), the right to hold a regular market, as they were extremely important for the economic prosperity of the river cities that possessed such rights, such as Leipzig (1507), Mainz, Munich (1332), and Cologne (where a Stapelhaus still stands as a reminder of the former right). At the same time, they created a strong barrier against long-distance trade because of the increased costs and the time required to unload and load ships, especially as a river might have multiple cities in a row with staple rights.

Staple rights required merchant barges or ships to unload their goods at the port and to display them for sale for a certain period, often three days. Only after that option had been given to local customers were traders allowed to reload their cargo and travel onwards with the remaining unsold freight.

The merchants often also did not have the option to avoid the respective cities, at least for certain goods, as they were forced by law to take the route of a prescribed tollway (such as the Via Regia or the Via Imperii) which was controlled by the city with staple right. That affected the transport especially of perishable goods like foodstuffs, but traders could often pay a fee to avoid having to display their wares, thus turning the staple right into a form of trade taxation, with similar but less severe results.

On the other hand, users of the road and visitors to cities with staple rights also gained several advantages, such as roads of better quality or the right of peaceful passage guaranteed by the local king. Those advantages were not common outside the tollways, as medieval local governments were usually weak, and street robberies were frequent.

Staple rights were probably introduced by Charlemagne (ruled 768–814). It was only in 1815, at the Congress of Vienna, that they were abolished. That policy took effect on the Rhine by the Mainzer Akte in 1831 and in 1839 for the whole of Germany, by the German Customs Union.

Limited staple rights were sometimes given to towns along major trade-routes like Görlitz, which obtained staple rights for salt and woad, and Lviv gained them in 1444.
