= Jeanne Barseghian =

French politician

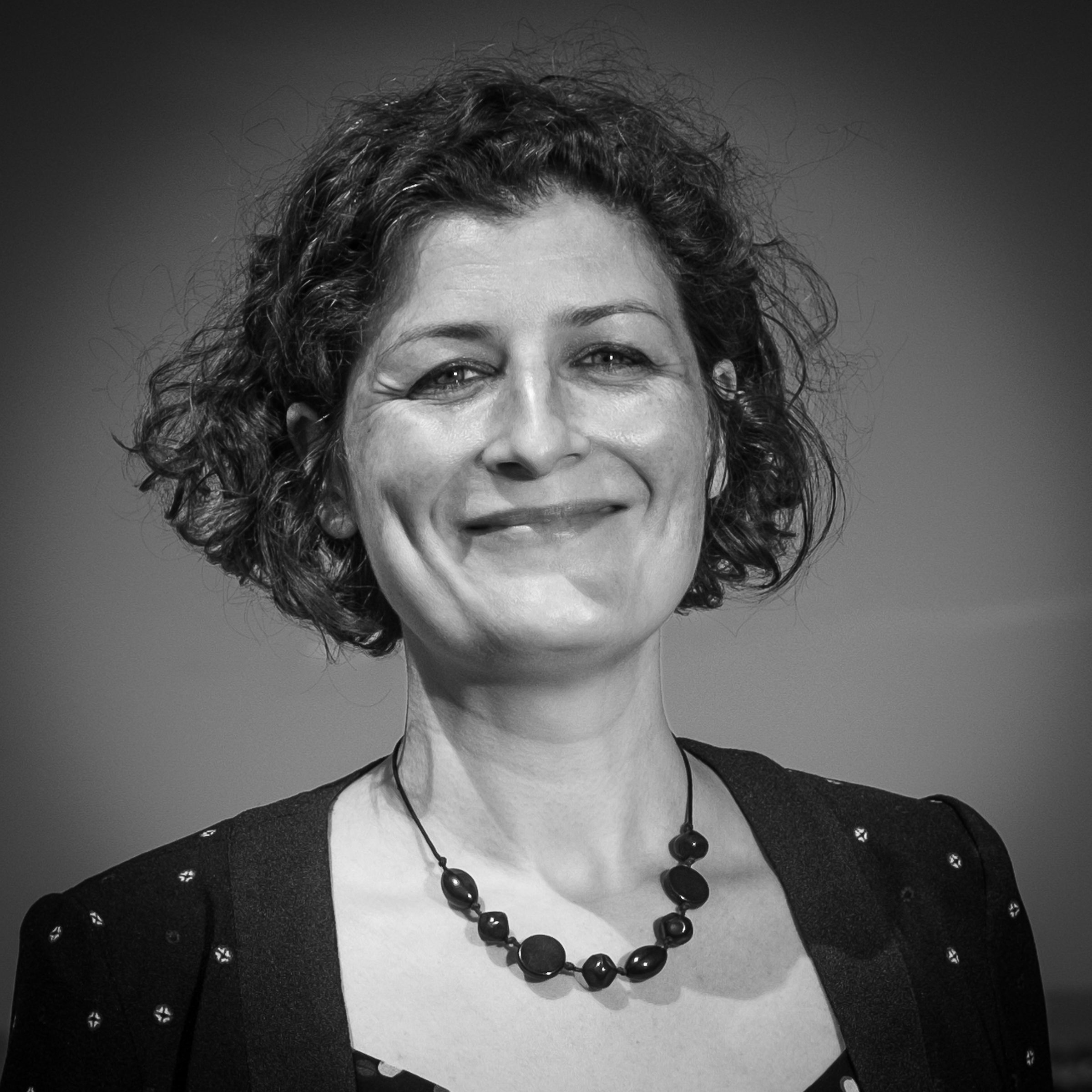
- Barseghian in 2020

Mayor of Strasbourg
- In office 4 July 2020 – 28 March 2026
- Preceded by: Roland Ries
- Succeeded by: Catherine Trautmann

Personal details
- Born: December 6, 1980 (age 45) Suresnes, France
- Party: Europe Ecology – The Greens
- Education: Paris Nanterre University; University of Strasbourg

Jeanne Barseghian (French pronunciation: [ʒan baʁseɡjɑ̃]; born 6 December 1980) is a French politician who was the mayor of Strasbourg and has been a member of its city council. She has been a member of Europe Ecology – The Greens (EELV) since 2013. She was elected in 2014 to the City Council of Strasbourg, and to the Eurométropole de Strasbourg Council. She was elected mayor of Strasbourg after she successfully led the EELV list in the 2020 municipal election there.

== Early life ==
Barseghian was born in Suresnes to a French family of Armenian descent. Her great-grandfather was the Armenian intellectual Sarkis Barseghian, and her great-grandmother was the writer and Member of the Armenian Parliament Perchuhi Partizpanyan-Barseghyan.

Barseghian studied law at Paris Nanterre University, specializing first in Franco-German law. She then studied environmental law at the Robert Schuman University in Strasbourg, and trained as an ecological advisor at the Institut Eco-Conseil in Strasbourg.

== Career ==
Barseghian moved to Strasbourg in 2002, to study environmental law. There she became involved in environmental and ecological activism with groups like Alsace Nature (fr). After she completed her legal studies, she advised companies, communities and local groups on economic, social and environmental issues. She worked on topics like the development of sustainable tourism around the Rhine, including for the Alsace Regional Council.

In 2009, Barseghian was a founder of a branch of the Sevak Association, an Armenian diaspora organization named for Paruyr Sevak.

In 2012, Barseghian resumed working for the Alsace Regional Council, consulting for the environmental caucus. She also worked as a public health consultant for hospitals.

In 2013, Barseghian joined the EELV, in advance of the 2014 French municipal elections. She was placed in 4th position on the EELV list in the municipal elections, and was named co-chair of the platform committee. She won a seat in the election, becoming a councilor at Strasbourg City Hall and the Strasbourg Eurometropolis. There she served as a member of the environmental and waste reduction committees.

In October 2019, Barseghian was named first on the greens' party list for the 2020 municipal elections in Strasbourg. In the first round, held on March 15, 2020, she placed first with 27.87% of the vote, substantially ahead of competitors including Alain Fontanel (fr) and Catherine Trautmann. Due to the COVID-19 lockdowns the second round of the election was postponed to June 28, 2020, when Barseghian faced Fontanel and Trautmann, whose lists had merged with other significant competitors in the first round. Barseghian won the second round with 41.7% of the vote.

Barseghian became mayor of Strasbourg on July 4, 2020. This made her the first mayor of the city representing the green movement, and also the first whose family was not from the Alsace Region. Barseghian also became the first vice president of the Eurométropole de Strasbourg.

In her first speech as mayor, Barseghian declared an ecological state of emergency, and reiterated her commitment to various measures that she had campaigned on including the demineralization of the city center, the creation of new parks and cycling paths, the exclusion of diesel vehicles from the city center by 2025 (which had also been a policy of her predecessor, Roland Ries), and giving aid to feminist associations.
