= Jospin government =

Government of the French Fifth Republic

- 27th Government of France

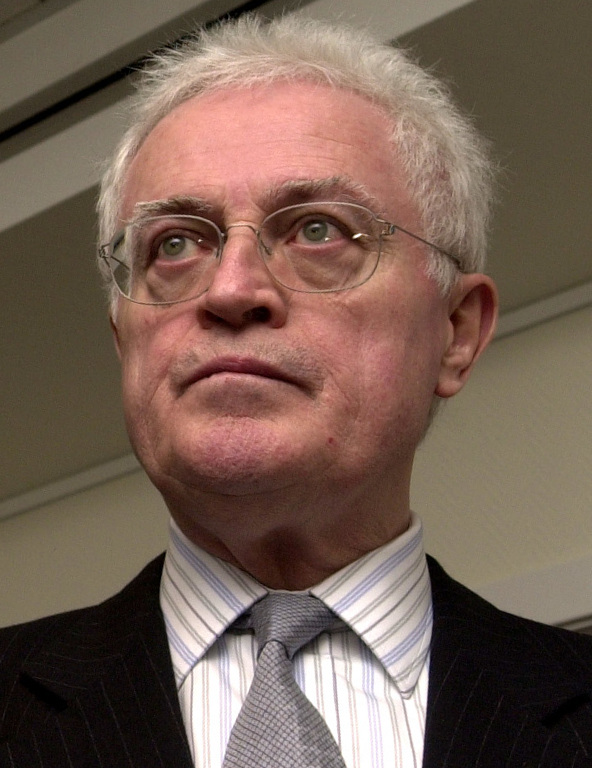
- Lionel Jospin
- Date formed: 2 June 1997
- Date dissolved: 6 May 2002

People and organisations
- Head of state: Jacques Chirac
- Head of government: Lionel Jospin
- No. of ministers: 14
- Member party: Plural Left
- Status in legislature: Majority

History
- Predecessor: Second Juppé government
- Successor: First Raffarin government

The Jospin government was the 27th government in the Fifth Republic of France. It was formed on 2 June 1997 by the decree of President Jacques Chirac. It was composed of members from the Socialist Party, Communist Party, Radical Party of the Left, The Greens and Movement of Citizens. It was dissolved on 6 May 2002 with the appointment of Jean-Pierre Raffarin as the new prime minister.

== Prime minister ==
Post	Name	Party
Prime Minister	Lionel Jospin	PS

== Ministers ==
Post	Name	Party
Minister of Employment and Solidarity	Martine Aubry	PS
Minister of Justice; Keeper of the Seals	Élisabeth Guigou	PS
Minister of National Education	Claude Allègre	PS
Minister of the Interior	Jean-Pierre Chevènement (until 3 September 1998)	MDC
Minister of the Interior	Jean-Jack Queyranne (until 30 December 1998)	PS
Minister of the Interior	Jean-Pierre Chevènement	MDC
Minister of Foreign Affairs	Hubert Védrine	PS
Minister of Economy, Finance and Industry	Dominique Strauss-Kahn (until 2 November 1999)	PS
Minister of Economy, Finance and Industry	Christian Sautter	PS
Minister of Defense	Alain Richard	PS
Minister of Equipment, Transport and Housing	Jean-Claude Gayssot	PCF
Minister of Culture and Communication; Government Spokesperson (until 30 March 1998)	Catherine Trautmann	PS
Minister of Agriculture and Fisheries	Louis Le Pensec (until 20 October 1998)	PS
Minister of Agriculture and Fisheries	Jean Glavany	PS
Minister of Land Planning and Environment	Dominique Voynet	LV
Minister for the Relation with the Parliament	Daniel Vaillant	PS
Minister of Civil Service, State Reform and Decentralization	Émile Zuccarelli	PRG
Minister of Youth and Sports	Marie-George Buffet	PCF
