= Niederlauterbach =

- Commune
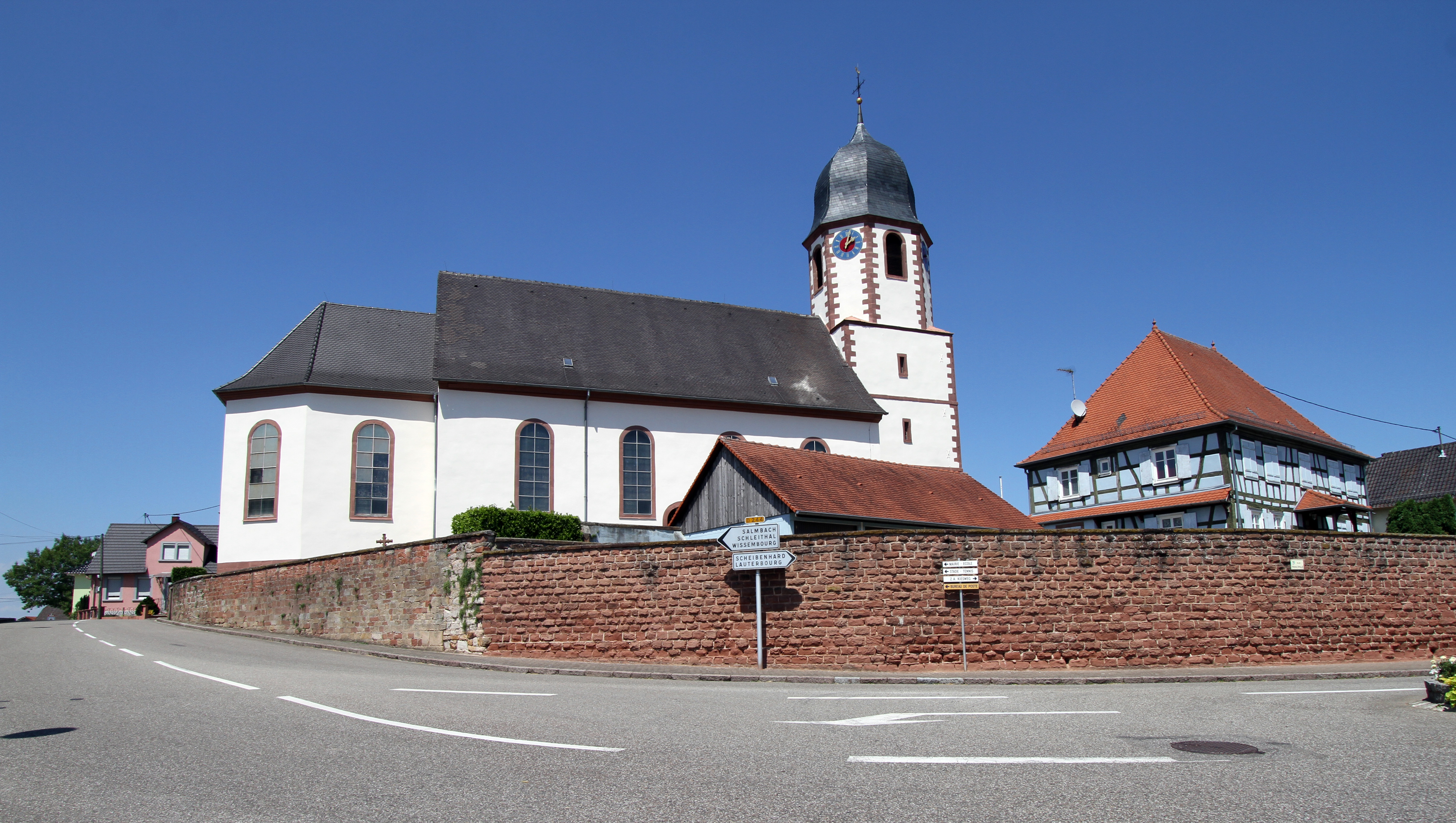
- The church in Niederlauterbach

- Coat of arms
- Location of Niederlauterbach
- Location within France Location within Grand Est
- Coordinates: 48°58′24″N 8°06′13″E
- Country: France
- Region: Grand Est
- Department: Bas-Rhin
- Arrondissement: Haguenau-Wissembourg
- Canton: Wissembourg

Government
  - Mayor (2020–2026): André Fritz
- Area^{1}: 11.22 km^{2} (4.33 sq mi)
- Highest elevation: 191 m (627 ft)
- Lowest elevation: 122 m (400 ft)
- Population (2023): 941
  - Density: 83.9/km^{2} (217/sq mi)
- Time zone: UTC+01:00 (CET)
  - Summer (DST): UTC+02:00 (CEST)
- INSEE/Postal code: 67327 /67630
- ^{1} French Land Register data, which excludes lakes, ponds, glaciers > 1 km^{2} (0.386 sq mi or 247 acres) and river estuaries.

Niederlauterbach (French pronunciation: [njədɛʁlotɛʁbaʃ]) is a commune in the Bas-Rhin department in Grand Est in north-eastern France.

== Notable people ==
- Roland Ries (born 1945), politician, mayor of Strasbourg between 2008 and 2020

== See also ==
- Communes of the Bas-Rhin department
