= Staple right =

Medieval European trader requirement

The staple right, also translated stacking right or storage right, both from the Dutch stapelrecht, was a medieval right accorded to certain ports, the staple ports. It required merchant barges or ships to unload their goods at the port and to display them for sale for a certain period, often three days. This system, known in German as Stapelrecht and in French as droit d’étape, was common throughout medieval Europe, particularly within the Holy Roman Empire, where it granted cities along major trade routes the privilege to compel passing merchants to offer their goods for local sale.

In 1254 the Portuguese Cortes of Leiria created staple laws on the Douro River, favoring the new royal city of Vila Nova de Gaia at the expense of the old episcopal city of Porto.

The English and Scottish concept of the Staple did not involve Stapel rights, but was instead a system in which local market monopolies were granted to designated towns and registered merchants by the government, in exchange for easier regulation and tighter control over customs duties.

== See also ==
- Amsterdam Entrepôt (Amsterdam stapelmarkt)
