= Groupement des autorités responsables de transport =

The groupement des autorités responsables de transport (GART, "Association of Transport Authorities") is a French Association (as defined by the Association loi de 1901) founded in 1980. It is formed of 263 autorités organisatrices de transports, of which 185 are agglomeration communities or urban communities, 59 are general councils and 19 are regional councils. These members have the objective of implementing and improving public transport in France. GART is a platform of exchange and transport matters, representing all political tendencies, and acts as their spokesbody at the national and European level.

== Mission ==
To be the spokesbody for French transport organisations before institutions, government, parliament, European Union bodies and the mass media.

- To offer to its members advice and expertise on economic, financial, legal and technical matters.
- Sustain and enliven debates on new projects and propose solutions that are both practical and innovative.
- Bring together players in the transport industry. GART stands up for "une conception du service public de transport accessible à tous, sur le plan économique, spatial, et physique. Personnes démunies, éloignées des centres-villes ou à mobilité réduite, toutes doivent bénéficier du meilleur transport possible pour faciliter leur accès à l'éducation, à l'emploi, aux équipements et aux services" ("The concept of a public transport service accessible to all at the economic, spatial and physical levels. The poor, those far from town, or with reduced mobility, should all benefit from the best possible transport to have access to education, work, facilities and services").

== Leadership ==
The association is headed by a President, in September 2014 this was Louis Nègre mayor of Cagnes-sur-Mer since 1995. The previous incumbent was Roland Ries, the senator-mayor of Strasbourg, elected in 2008 and re-elected in 2011. Ries was vice-president of GART from 1996 to 2001.

Presidents of GART
Start date	End date	Name	Party	Position
10 September 2014	September 2017	Louis Nègre	UMP	Mayor of Cagnes-sur-Mer
14 September 2011	9 September 2014	Roland Ries	Socialist	Senator-mayor of Strasbourg
10 September 2008	13 September 2011	Roland Ries	Socialist	Senator-mayor of Strasbourg
2001	2008	Michel Destot	Socialist	Deputy mayor of Grenoble
1989	2001	Jacques Auxiette	Socialist	Mayor of La Roche-sur-Yon

== Complementary activities ==
In 2005, together with the Union des transports publics et ferroviaires (UTP, "Public transport and railways union"), GART created the "GIE Objectif transport public" ("GIE Transport Objective"). Its mission was to promote sustainable public transport both to the public at large and to professionals in the sector (organising major European events and national mobilisation campaigns).

== Sources ==
- Auxiette, Jacques (November–December 1994). "Les transports publics et le rôle du GART" [Public transport and GART's rôle]. Le Rail (in French) (8): 29–31.
