= Catherine Trautmann =

French politician (born 1951)

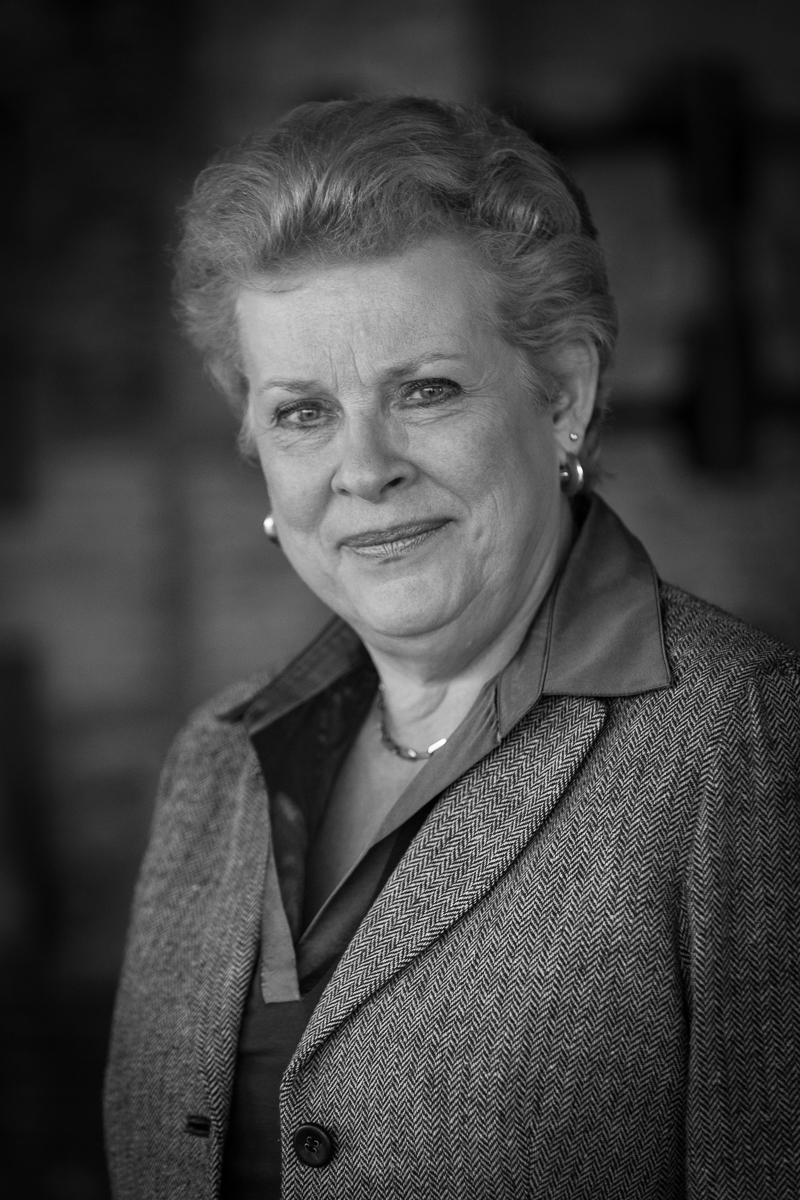

Mayor of Strasbourg
- Incumbent
- Assumed office 28 March 2026
- Preceded by: Jeanne Barseghian
- In office 25 June 2000 – 19 March 2001
- Preceded by: Roland Ries
- Succeeded by: Fabienne Keller
- In office 24 March 1989 – 25 June 1997
- Preceded by: Marcel Rudloff
- Succeeded by: Roland Ries

Spokesperson of the Government
- In office 4 June 1997 – 30 March 1998
- President: Jacques Chirac
- Prime Minister: Lionel Jospin
- Government: Jospin
- Preceded by: Alain Lamassoure
- Succeeded by: Daniel Vaillant

Minister of Culture
- In office 4 June 1997 – 27 March 2000
- President: Jacques Chirac
- Prime Minister: Lionel Jospin
- Government: Jospin
- Preceded by: Philippe Douste-Blazy
- Succeeded by: Catherine Tasca

Secretary of State for the Elderly and Disabled people
- President: François Mitterrand
- Prime Minister: Michel Rocard
- Minister: Michel Delebarre
- Preceded by: Office created
- Succeeded by: Théo Braun (Elderly); Michel Gillibert (Disabled people)

Member of the European Parliament
- In office 20 July 2004 – 30 June 2014
- Election: 13 June 2004; 7 June 2009
- Parliament: 6th and 7th
- Parliamentary group: ESP (2004-2009); S&D (2009-2014)
- Constituency: East France
- In office 25 July 1989 – 5 June 1997
- Election: 15 June 1989; 12 June 1994
- Parliament: 3rd and 4th
- Parliamentary group: ESP
- Constituency: France

Member of the National Assembly
- In office 12 June 1997 – 4 July 1997
- Election: 1st June 1997
- National Assembly: 11th (Fifth Republic)
- Preceded by: Harry Lapp
- Succeeded by: Armand Jung
- Parliamentary group: SOC
- Constituency: Bas-Rhin's 1st
- In office 2 April 1986 – 14 May 1988
- Election: 16 May 1986
- National Assembly: 8th (Fifth Republic)
- Preceded by: Proportional vote by Department
- Succeeded by: Proportional vote by Department
- Parliamentary group: SOC
- Constituency: Bas-Rhin

Personal details
- Born: 15 January 1951 (age 75) Strasbourg, France
- Party: Socialist Party
- Education: University of Strasbourg

Video-Introduction

Catherine Trautmann (born 15 January 1951) is a French politician for the French Socialist Party. She served as Minister of Culture of France in the Lionel Jospin cabinet 1997–2000 and was a Member of the European Parliament 1989–1997 and 2004–2014. Trautmann was once again elected as mayor of Strasbourg on 22 March 2026 campaining broadly on an anti-Jeanne Barseghian message.

== Career ==
She studied in Strasbourg, obtaining a master's degree in Protestant theology at the Protestant theological faculty of the University of Strasbourg. She is also a specialist on Coptic language and literature.

She was elected as the first female mayor of Strasbourg in 1989, re-elected in 1995, then defeated in 2001.

In the EP she sat on the Committee on Industry, Research and Energy and was a substitute for the Committee on Culture and Education and also a member of the Delegation for relations with Canada. She was elected from the constituency of East France.

- Master's degree in Protestant theology (1975)
- Member of the Socialist Party national council (1977)
- Member of the Socialist Party national bureau (2000)
- Member of the national bureau of the National Federation of Socialist and Republican Elected Representatives
- Member of Strasbourg Municipal Council (1983)
- Mayor of Strasbourg and Chairwoman of the Strasbourg Urban Community Council (1989–1997 and 2000–2001)
- Member of Strasbourg City Council and Member of the Strasbourg Urban Community Council (since 2001)
- Member of the National Assembly (1986–1988)
- State Secretary for the Elderly and Disabled (1988)
- Minister for Culture and Communications (1997–2000)
- Member of the European Parliament (1989–1997)
- Council of Europe (1987–1988)
- Chairwoman of the Interdepartmental Task Force on Drug addiction (1988–1990)
- Commissioner-General for the Expo International 2004 (2000–2002) (cancelled in 2003)
