= Central Commission for Navigation on the Rhine =

International organization for Rhine navigation

Central Commission for the Navigation of the Rhine
(in other official languages)
German	Zentralkommission für die Rheinschifffahrt
French	Commission centrale pour la navigation du Rhin
Dutch	Centrale Commissie voor de Rijnvaart
- Flag

- Map of member and observing countries.
- Abbreviation: CCNR
- Formation: 1815
- Type: IGO
- Headquarters: Palais du Rhin, Strasbourg (France)
- Region served: Rhine basin
- Members: Belgium, France, Germany, Netherlands and Switzerland
- Main organ: Secretariat
- Website: www.ccr-zkr.org

The Central Commission for the Navigation of the Rhine (CCNR; French: Commission centrale pour la navigation du Rhin; German: Zentralkommission für die Rheinschifffahrt; Dutch: Centrale Commissie voor de Rijnvaart) is an international organisation with five member countries, whose function is to encourage European prosperity by guaranteeing a high level of security for navigation of the Rhine and environs. Founded in 1815, it is the world's oldest international organization still in operation. It has been based in Strasbourg, France, since 1920. Hester Duursema from the Netherlands has been its Secretary General since January 2026.

== Members ==
The current Member States are Germany, Belgium, France, the Netherlands and Switzerland. Although the Rhine does not pass through Belgian territory, the Belgian Rhine fleet is third after the Netherlands and Germany in terms of volume transported.

Individual German states were members before World War I. The United States was temporarily a member immediately after World War II, while Germany was under Allied occupation, until 1961. Italy and the United Kingdom were also members following the Treaty of Versailles, though Italy renounced its position in 1935 and the UK renounced it in 1993.

== Functions ==
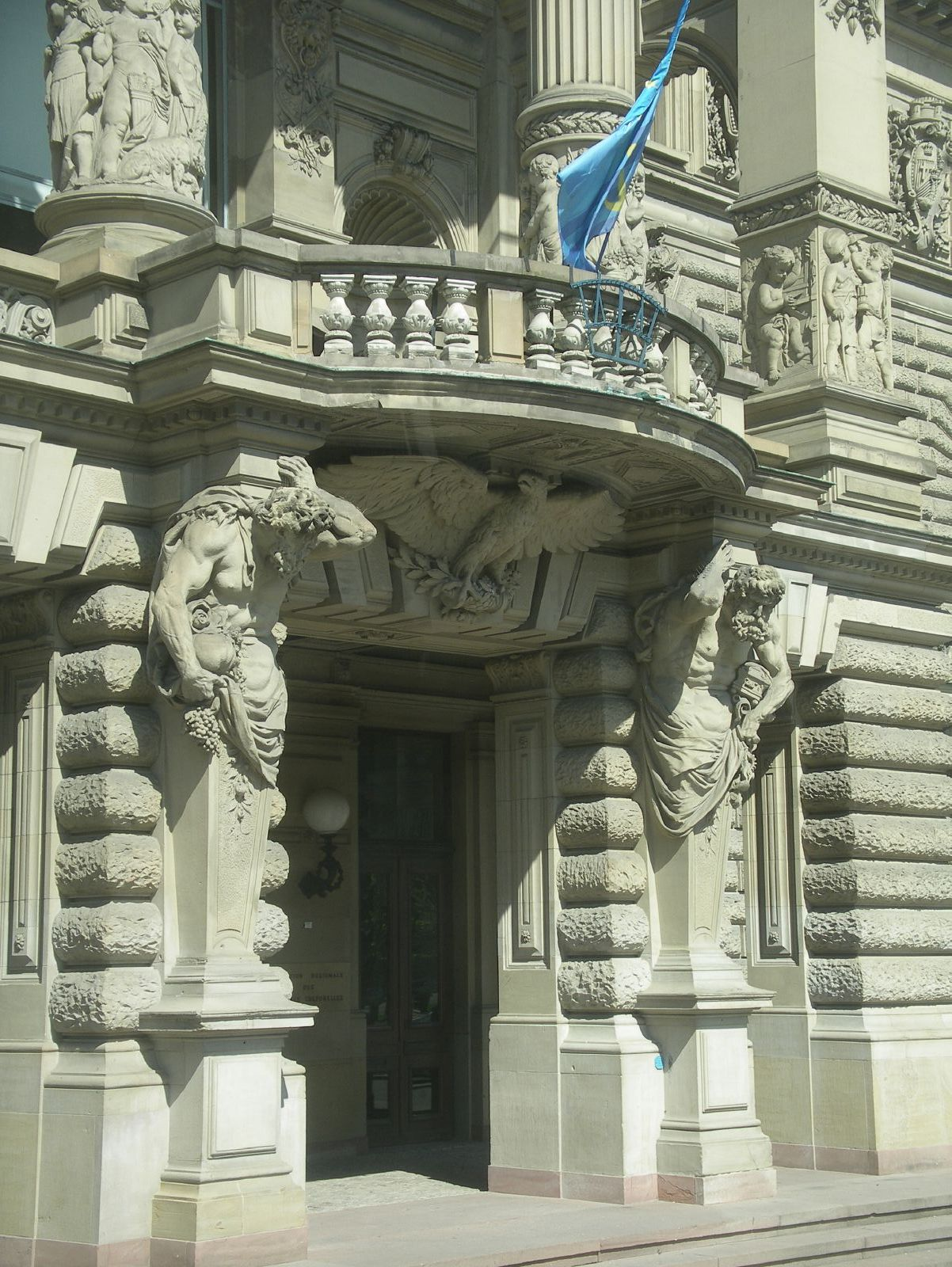
The entrance of the Palais du Rhin, with flag

Created as an international highway meant to promote commerce, today the commission is responsible for regulating traffic on the Rhine, assisting with works on the river, and functioning as the seat of the Rhine navigation tribunal. Its operational budget is €2.7 million annually.

Since 1920, the headquarters of the commission has been located in Strasbourg, in the former imperial palace, renamed the Palais du Rhin, which also houses the Regional Directorate of Cultural Affairs of Alsace.

The commission meets in plenary session twice a year. The Member States are represented by two to four commissioners and two deputy commissioners from their administrations; decisions are taken unanimously.

Its working languages are German, French and Dutch, in accordance with Article 41 of its rules of procedure.

== History ==
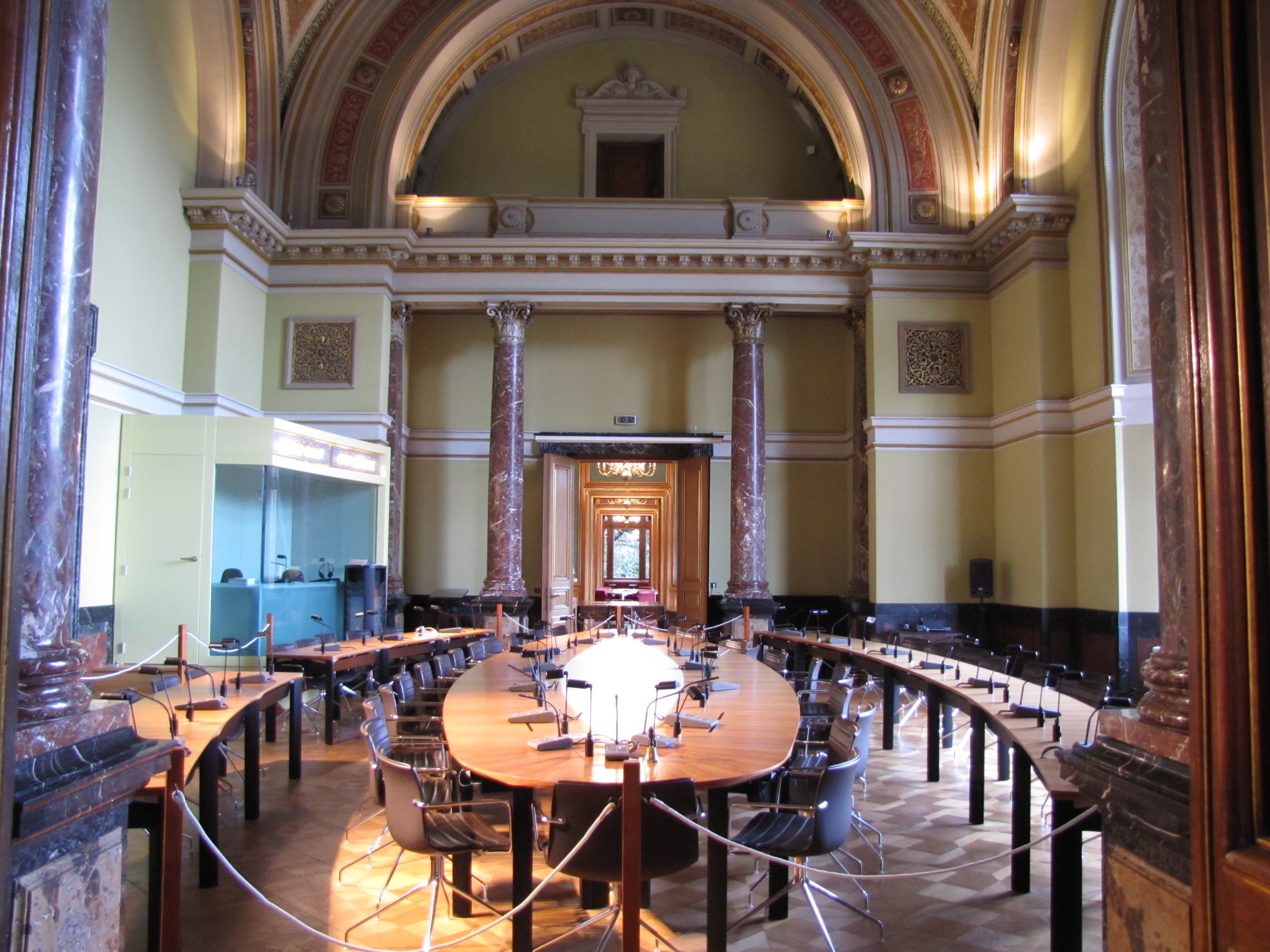
Main assembly room of the Commission

Legally, the commission's authority comes from agreements made at the Congress of Vienna, held in 1815 in the aftermath of the Napoleonic Wars. The first meeting took place on 15 August 1816 in Mainz, with France, the Grand Duchy of Baden, the Kingdom of Bavaria, the Grand Duchy of Hesse, the Duchy of Nassau, the Netherlands and the Kingdom of Prussia represented.

In 1831, the Convention of Mainz was adopted, establishing a number of the first laws governing Rhine navigation. In 1861, the commission's seat was moved to Mannheim, and on 17 October 1868, the Mannheimer Akte was agreed to. This agreement still governs the principles of Rhine navigation today.

Following the Franco-Prussian War of 1870, the commission primarily played the role of a German-Dutch bilateral body, France having ceased to be a member after the Treaty of Frankfurt (1871).

After the end of the First World War, the commission's headquarters was moved to Strasbourg in 1920 as part of the Treaty of Versailles. Belgium, the Kingdom of Italy and the United Kingdom, as well as Switzerland joined the commission while Germany participated for the first time as a national entity with the Weimar Republic. Italy withdrew in 1935 and Adolf Hitler denounced Germany's membership on November 14, 1936. Following the Battle of France and the armistice of June 22, 1940, the commission was suspended.

The commission resumed its work on November 20, 1945. The current revised convention was signed in Strasbourg by the five current members of the commission and the United Kingdom on 20 November 1963 and entered into force on 14 April 1967. There have since been additional protocols.

In 2003 the European Commission asked for the permission of the Council of Ministers to negotiate the adherence of the European Union to the regulations of the CCNR and the Danube Commission, especially given the prospective enlargement of the EU.

== See also ==
- International Commission for the Protection of the Danube River
- European institutions in Strasbourg
