= Strasbourg-Ortenau Eurodistrict =

Franco-German eurodistrict

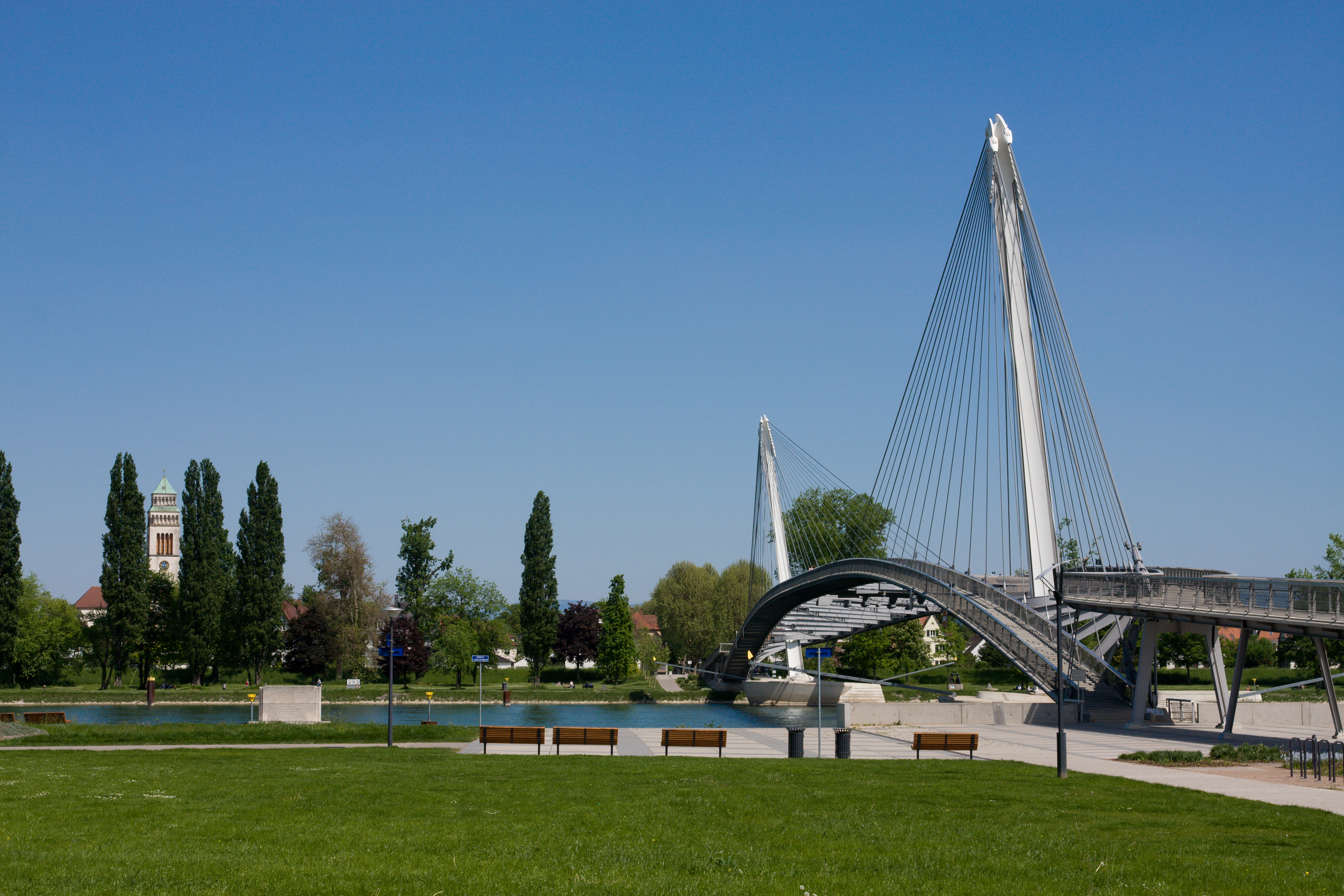
The Passerelle Mimram, a pedestrian bridge linking the French and German sides of the Rhine.

The Eurodistrict Strasbourg-Ortenau is a Franco-German eurodistrict, a cross-border administrative entity (European Grouping for Territorial Cooperation) sharing common institutions, established on 17 October 2005 and definitely functional since 4 February 2010. The district is formed by the Eurométropole de Strasbourg (centred on the city of Strasbourg), the Communauté de communes du Canton d'Erstein (a groupement of the urban communities of Rhinau, Erstein and Benfeld) and the French State on the French side of the Rhine and the Ortenau district, comprising the cities of Achern, Kehl, Lahr, Oberkirch and Offenburg, in the Baden-Württemberg region on the German side. The population of the district was roughly 1,000,000 in 2022, and it covers an area of 2,468 km^{2} (953 sq mi)
Building on regional and Franco-German cooperation, it aims to develop bonds between citizens, associations, public administrations, educational establishments and corporations. It is also in the context of European integration, with the presence of European institutions in Strasbourg, and has been compared to a EU version of Washington D.C.

The Eurodistrict's Council is composed of 30 members, with 15 each representing either the French or the German side.

== History ==
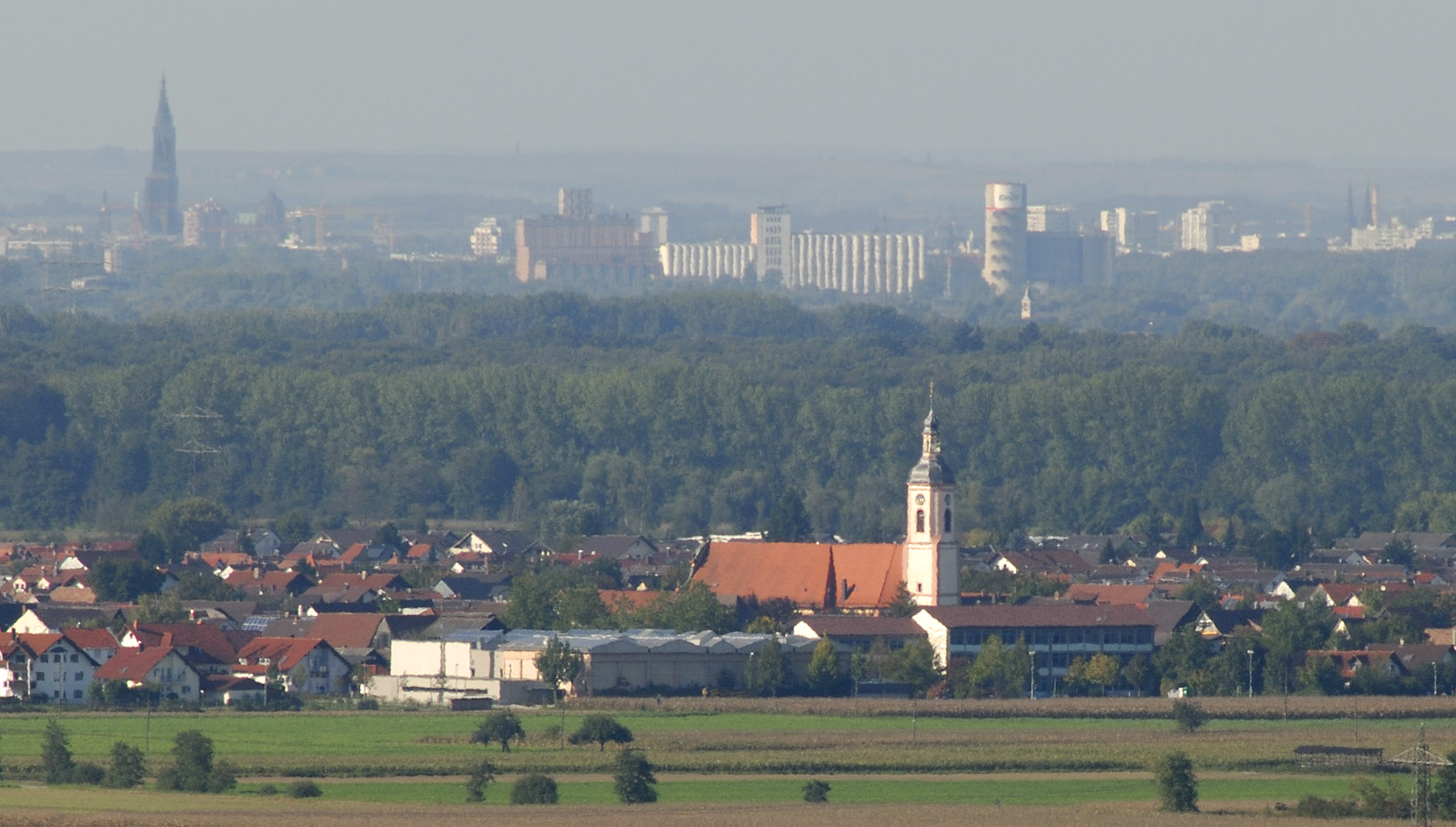
Looking across the Ortenau from Schutterwald to Strasbourg.

The idea of a eurodistrict Strasbourg-Kehl (as it was called then) was officially launched on 22 January 2003, by then-French President Jacques Chirac and then-German Chancellor Gerhard Schröder during a meeting in the Élysée Palace; it was point 24 of the common declaration made on the 40th anniversary of the cooperation treaty between Germany and France. 22 January was furthermore declared "French-German day" (journée franco-allemande, deutsch-französischer Tag)

A common resolution to create the Strasbourg-Ortenau Eurodistrict was signed on 24 May 2003 in Offenburg by Fabienne Keller, the mayor of Strasbourg, Robert Grossmann, the president of the Communauté urbaine de Strasbourg, the mayors of Kehl, Offenburg, Achern, Lahr and Oberkirch as well as the President (Landrat) of the Ortenau district. The resolution's aim was to present a viable version of the project at the upcoming French-German summit on 10 June 2003.

On 30 June 2003, the French minister for European Affairs, Noëlle Lenoir, and her German colleague, Hans Martin Bury, signed the official document specifying the legal, political, economical, demographic etc. frameworks (cadres) within which the Eurodistrict was to be called into existence. The document also announced that further presentations of the project were to be made at the French-German summit in the following autumn, as well as during the crossborder flower festival on both banks of the Rhine held in Strasbourg and Kehl in the spring 2004.

Mayor of Strasbourg Roland Ries, during and after his election campaign in 2007, proposed the strengthening of the district in order to maintain the presence of the European Parliament in the city (see Location of European Union institutions) and making it more autonomous and akin to a European capital territory. However the Ortenaukreis communities have been less enthusiastic about the Eurodistrict project. In late January 2010 the German State greenlighted the entity and the inaugural session of the Eurodistrict's Council took place on 4 February 2010. Roland Ries was elected as the council's first president.

== Transportation ==
The Eurodistrict is served by several cross-border transportation companies: Ortenau S-Bahn (railway), TER Alsace (railway), Compagnie des Transports Strasbourgeois (tramway and buses).
