= Palais du Rhin =

Palace in Strasbourg, France

Coordinates: 48°35′16″N 7°45′09″E

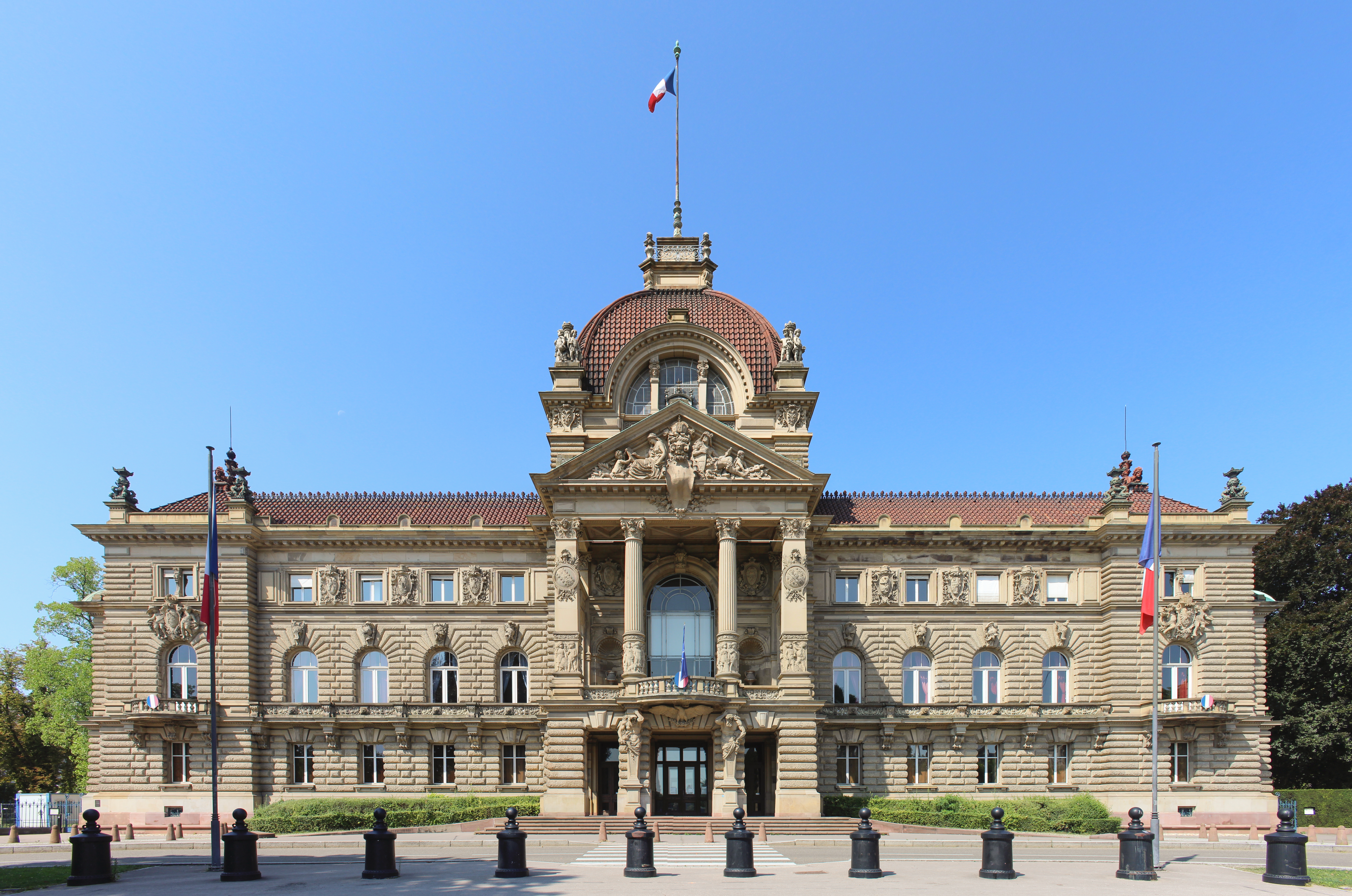
The Palais du Rhin, Strasbourg

The Palais du Rhin (English: Palace of the Rhine), the former Kaiserpalast (Imperial palace), is a building situated in the German (north-east) quarter of Strasbourg (Neustadt), dominating the Place de la République (the former Kaiserplatz) with its massive dome. A huge building, it and the surrounding gardens, as well as the neighbouring stables, are an outstanding landmark of 19th-century German architecture.

== History ==
After the Franco-Prussian War of 1870–71, Strasbourg, along with the rest of Alsace-Lorraine, was annexed by the German Empire. As the capital of the new German province, Strasbourg was faced with the question of an official residence for the Kaiser. The decision was made to create a building symbolic of imperial power, and after much debate, a square neo-Renaissance design was chosen, remotely inspired by the Palazzo Pitti in Florence. The architect was Hermann Eggert (1844–1920), who had already built, among other things, the Observatory of Strasbourg.

Work began on 22 March 1884 in honour of Kaiser William I's 87th birthday, and construction took five years. The project received a good deal of criticism, with many questioning the need and use of the building, its appearance, and its price of three million German marks.

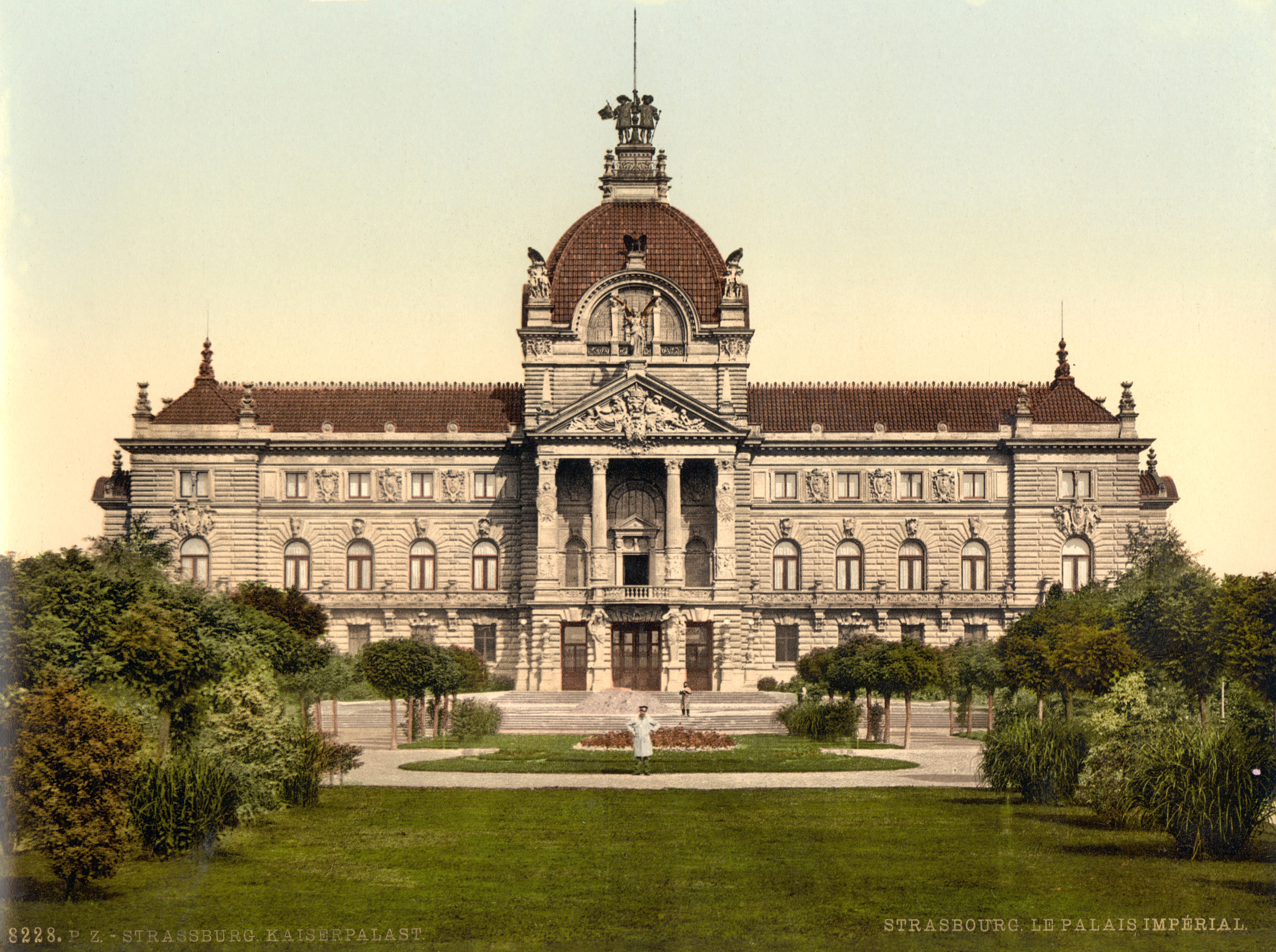
On a postcard from 1900

Inaugurated by Kaiser William II in August 1889, the palace housed the emperor for twelve visits down to 1914.

During the First World War, the building was converted into a military hospital. After the city returned to France, in 1920 it adopted its current name when the oldest of the European institutions, the Central Commission for Navigation on the Rhine, moved in.

In 1923, the palace passed hands to the French state and today houses the Direction régionale des affaires culturelles (DRAC) of Grand Est.

Transformed into the Kommandantur by the Nazis during the German occupation of France between 1940 and 1945, the building was recaptured by the troops of General Leclerc, who transformed it into their general headquarters. It was there that he wrote his proclamation announcing the realization of his oath at Kufra, proclaiming that he would fight until the French flag flew again over the cathedrals of Strasbourg and Metz.

Threatened with destruction in the 1970s, the palace, classified as a monument historique since 1993, also houses the Direction régionale des affaires culturelles of Alsace (DRAC Alsace).

In 2008, the Palais was used as the setting of the Paris Gestapo headquarters (in fact situated in the Hôtel Lutetia) for the shooting of the French TV mini-series "La Résistance".

== Gallery ==
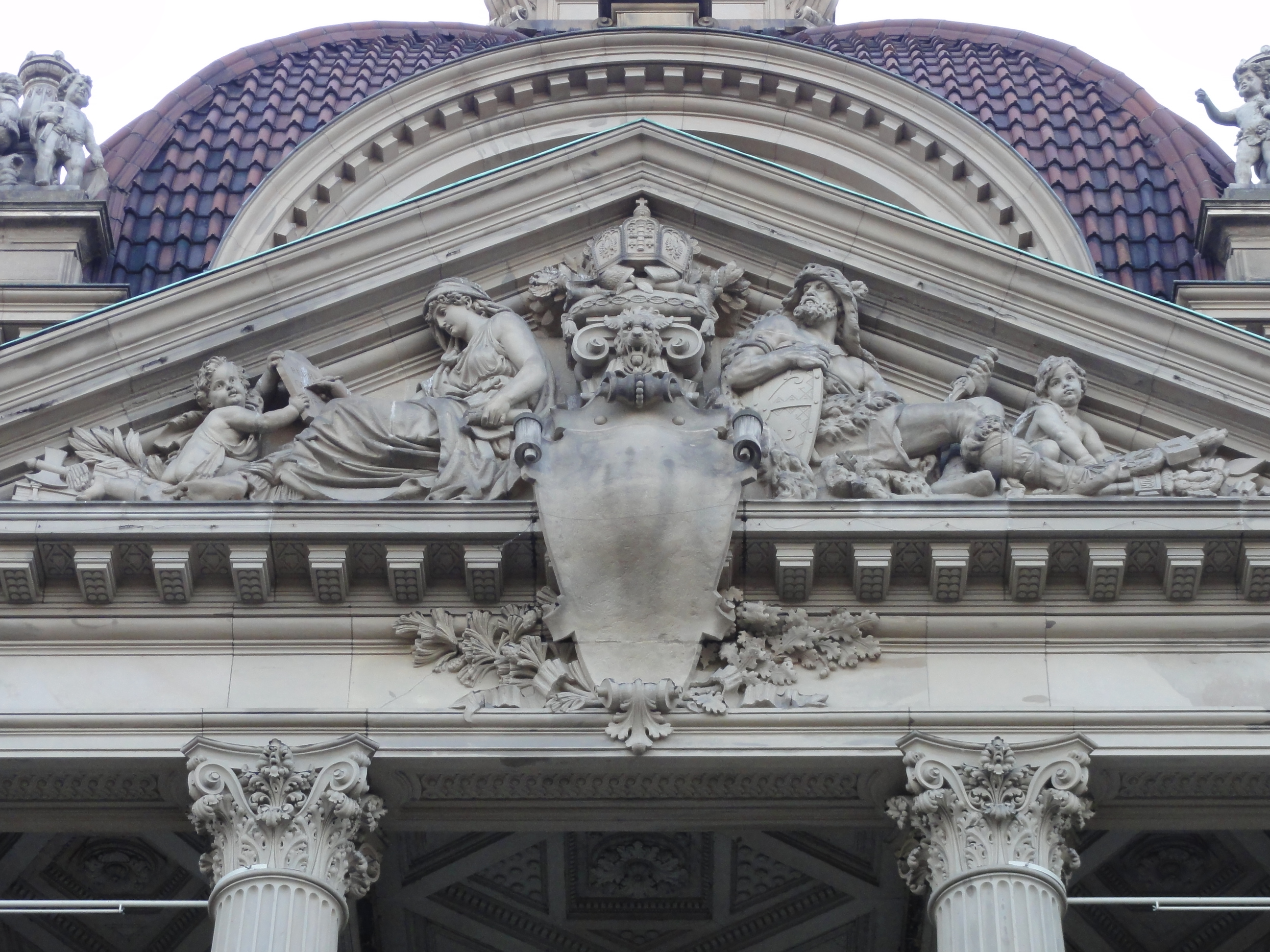
Pediment above the entrance

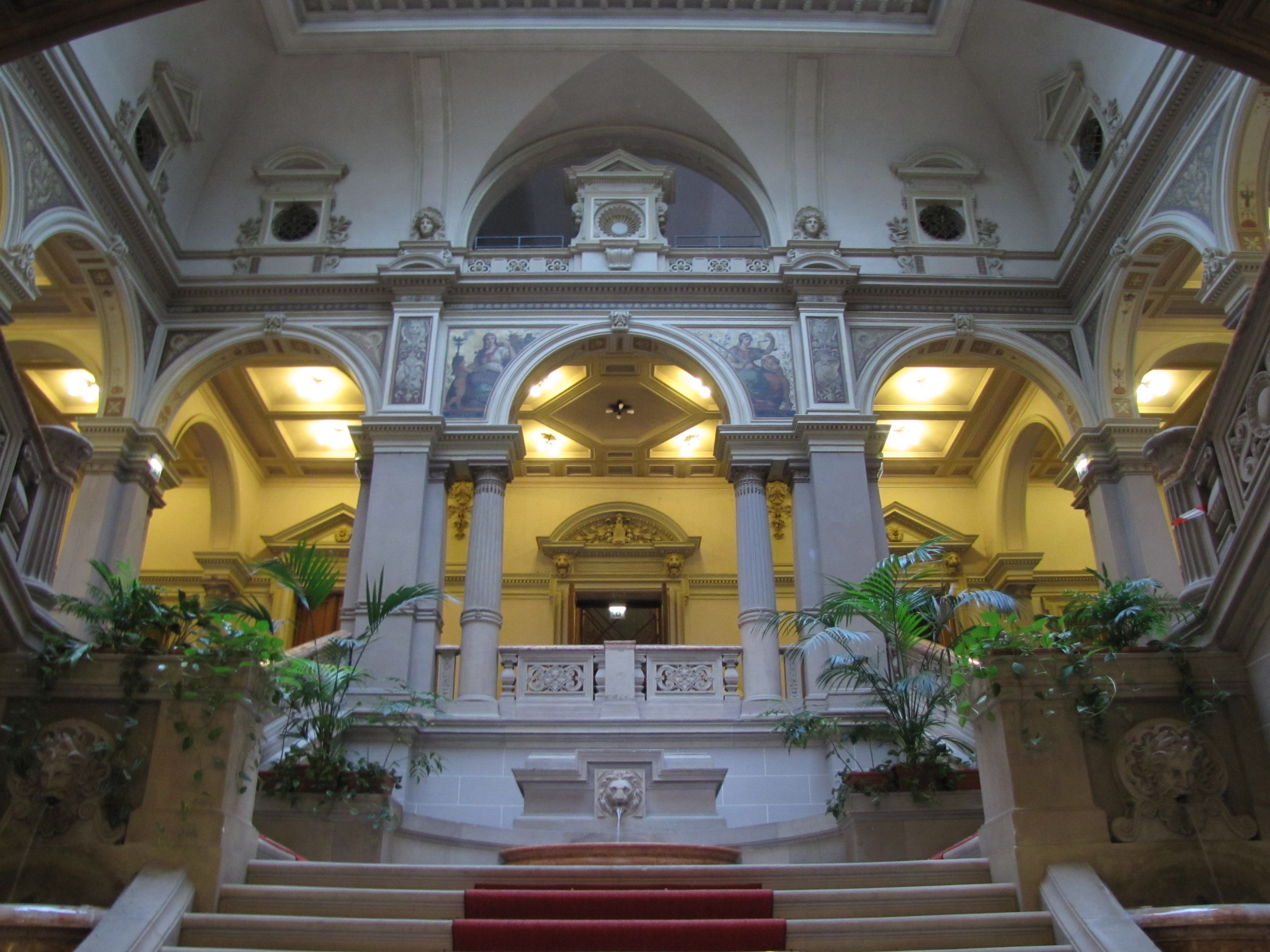
Main staircase

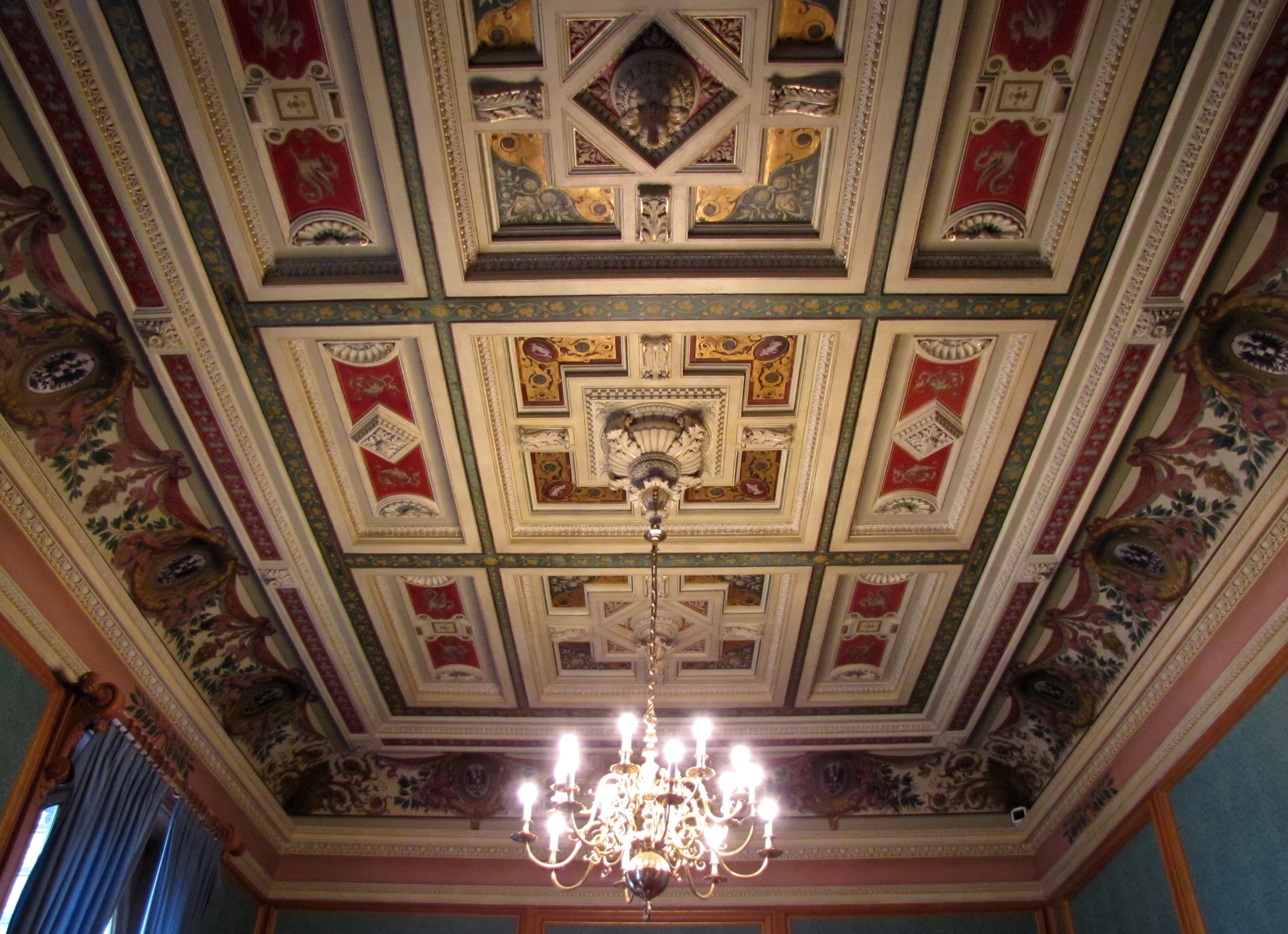
Coffered ceiling of a reception room

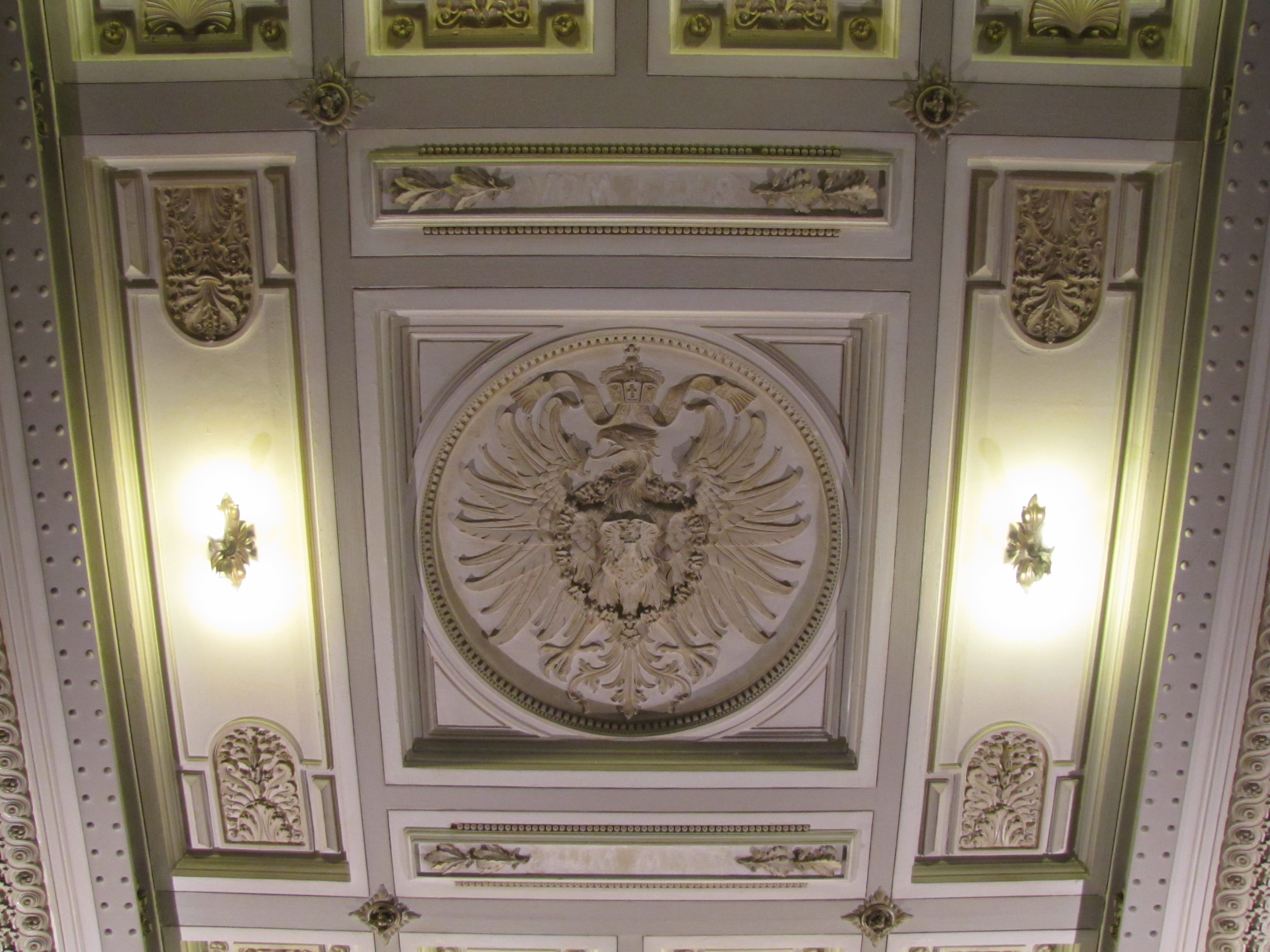
Coffered ceiling with Reichsadler

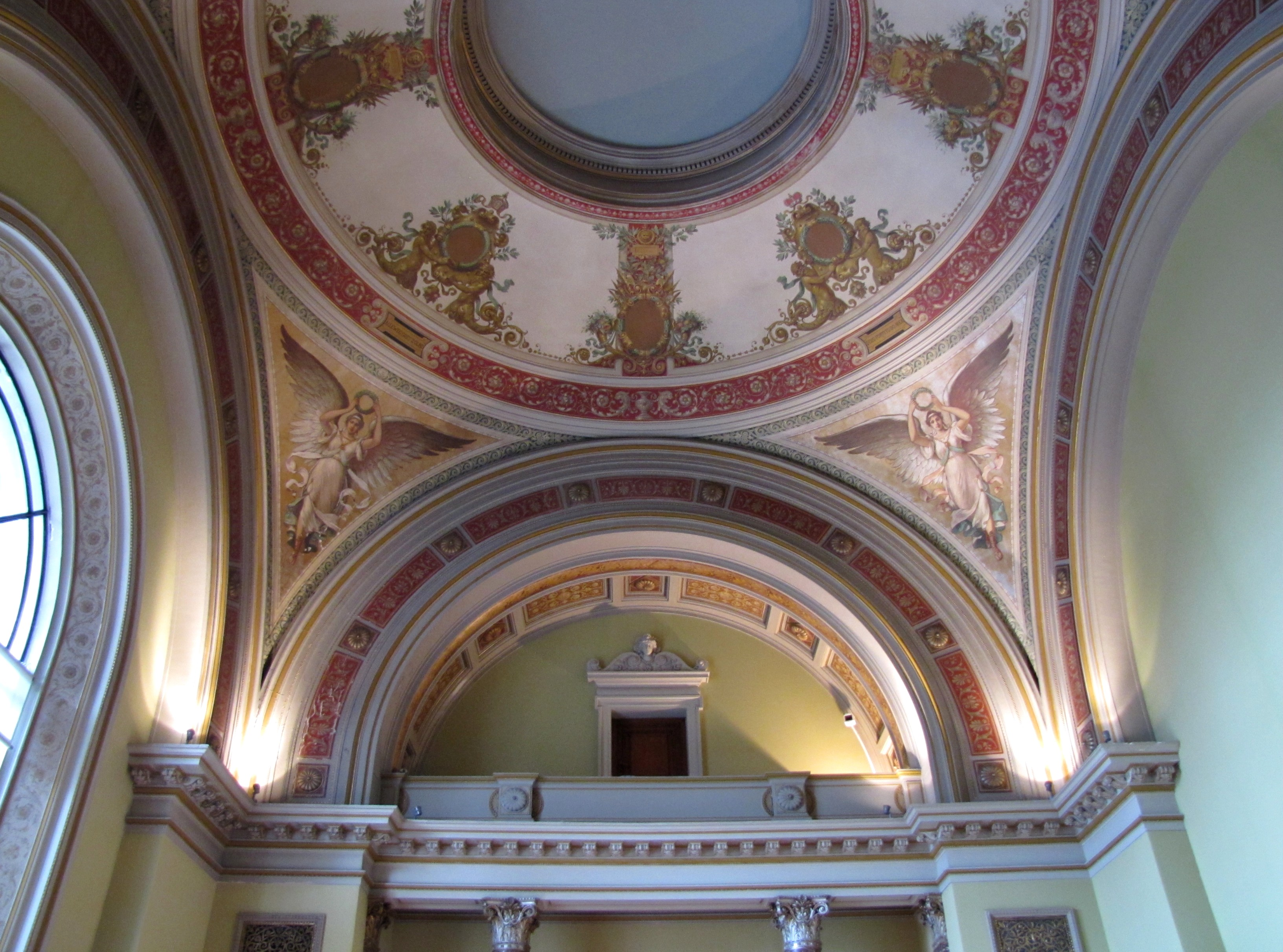
Dome of audience hall

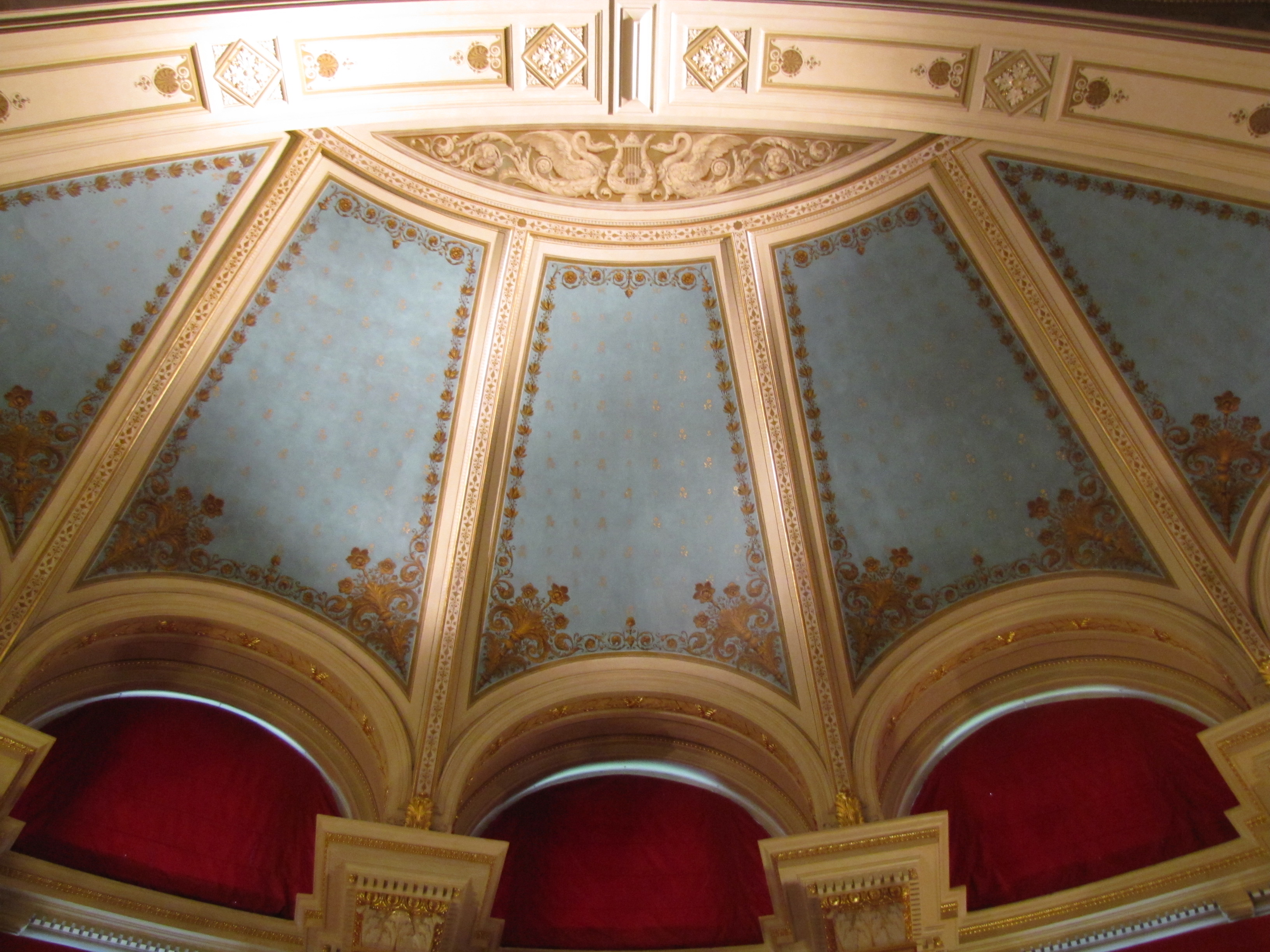
Vault of ball room

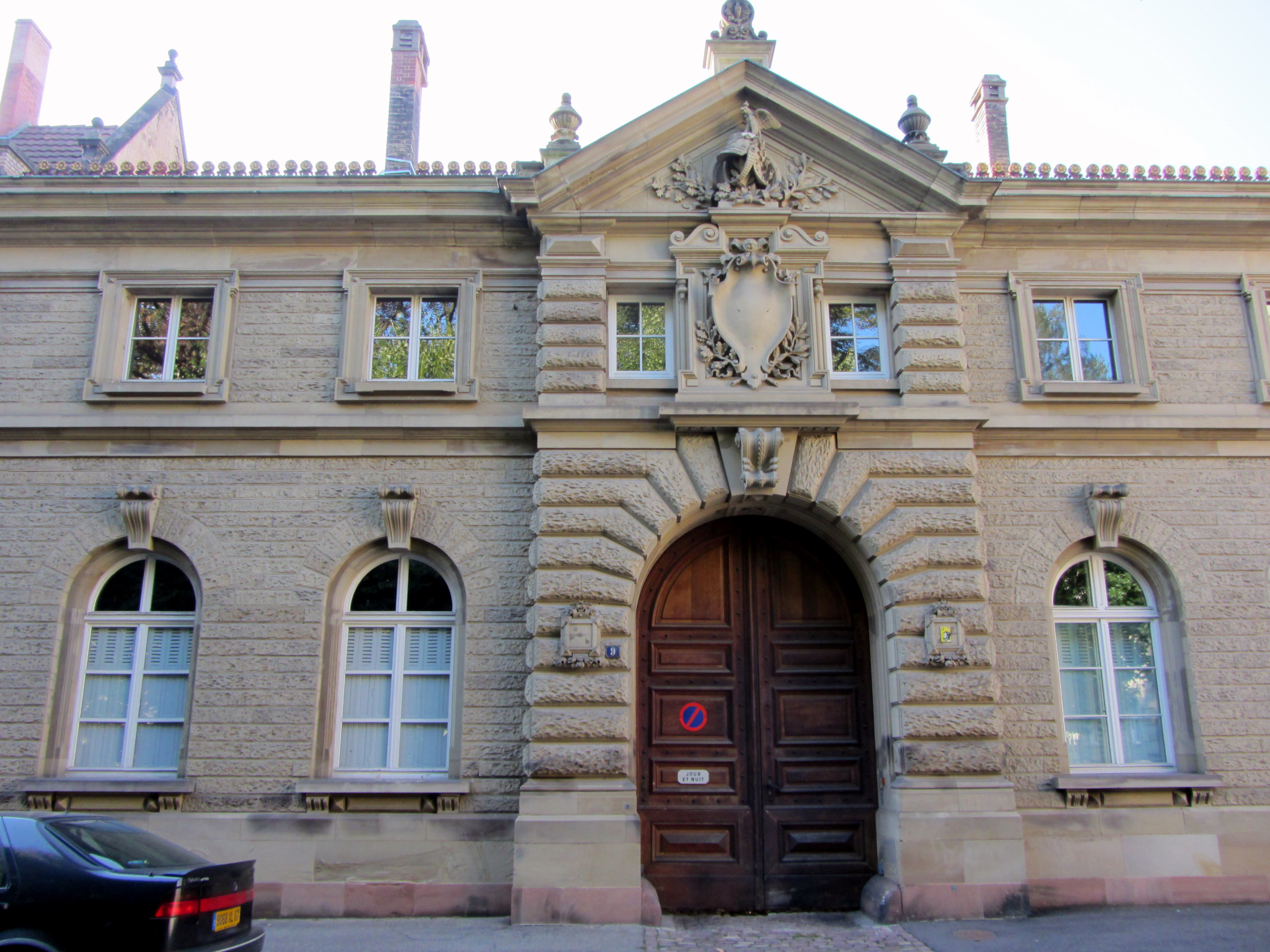
Stables

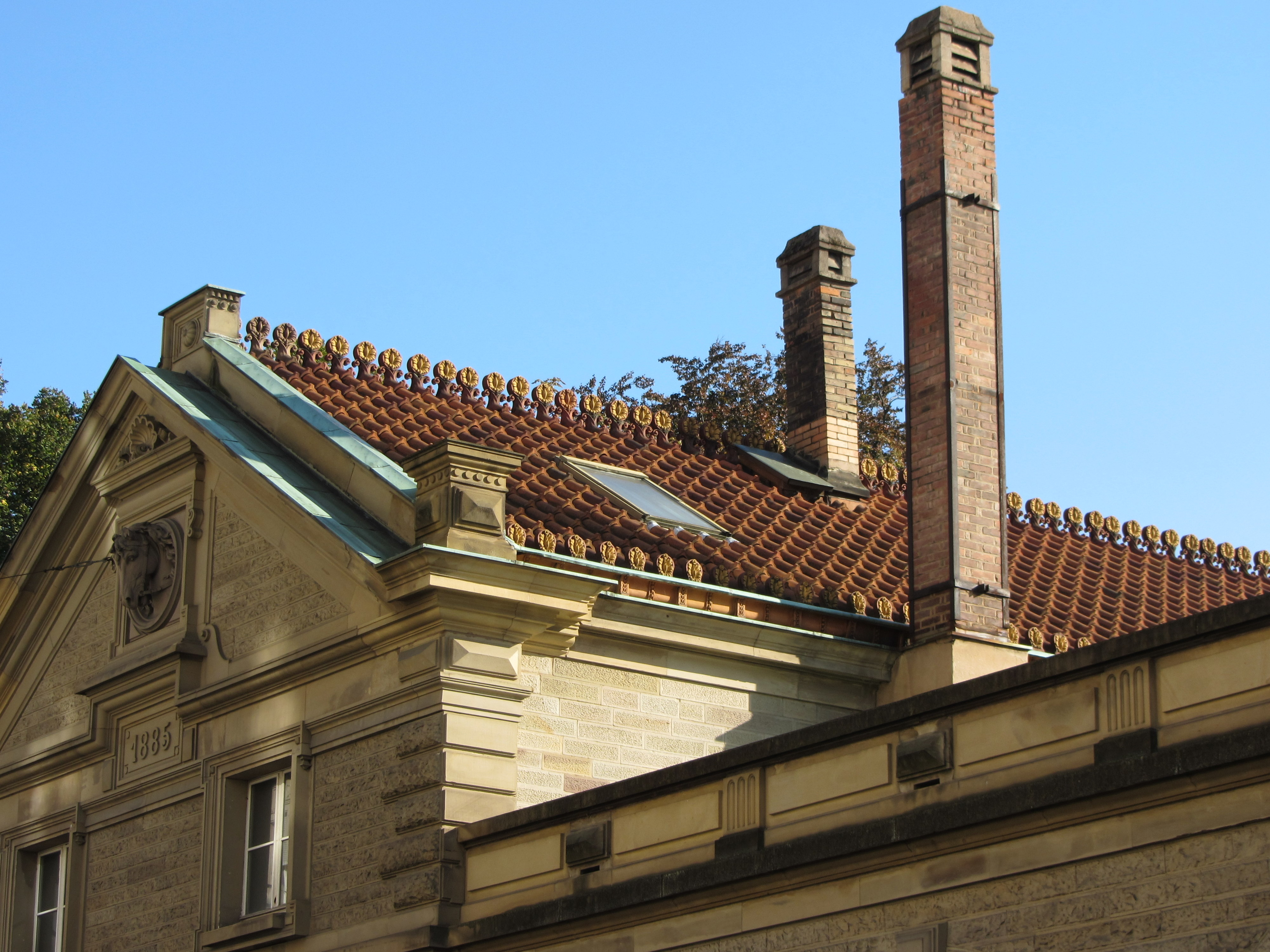
Detail of stables
