= Mannheimer Akte =

Treaty on Rhine navigation (1868)

The Mannheimer Akte (Mannheim Act) (officially: Revised Rhine Navigation Act of 17 October 1868) is an international agreement that regulates vessel traffic on the Rhine. The principles of the Treaty are:

- Free shipping
- Equal treatment of sailors and fleet
- Exemption from shipping charges
- Simplified customs clearance
- Obligation to maintain the Rhine's banks
- Standardization of ship safety and ship traffic regulations
- A single jurisdiction for shipping matters and the establishment of the Rhine waterway courts
- Establishing a commission to monitor these principles.

== History ==
- 1648: Free shipping on the Rhine was first settled, in the Peace of Westphalia, but could not prevail in practice.
- 1815: Called the Final Act of the Congress of Vienna, the freedom of navigation of international waters of the Rhine and the establishment of a commission.
- 1816: This Central Commission for the Navigation of the Rhine first met in Mainz, Germany.
- 31 March 1831: The Mainzer Akte was agreed to.
- 1861: The Commission was transferred to Mannheim.
- 17 October 1868: The Convention of Mannheim was signed by Baden, Bavaria, France, Hesse, the Netherlands and Prussia, valid in its principles today.
- 1919: It was changed by the Treaty of Versailles Article 355 of the Convention of Mannheim.
- 1920: The headquarters of the Commission was moved to Strasbourg.
- 1963: An agreement was confirmed with the principles of the Mannheim Act (enacted in 1967) and Switzerland was a signatory.

It is now implemented by the Central Commission for Navigation on the Rhine.
