= Eurodistrict =

European administrative unit governing binational cities

A eurodistrict is a European administrative entity that contains urban agglomerations which lie across the border between two or more states. A eurodistrict offers a program for cooperation and integration of the towns or communes which it comprises: for example, improving transport links for people who live and work on different sides of the border.

The first Eurodistricts created or currently undergoing creation are:

- Strasbourg-Ortenau
- Freiburg im Breisgau-Centre et Sud Alsace (i.e. Haut-Rhin)
- Lille-Kortrijk-Tournai (Eurometropolis)
- Saar-Moselle
- Trinational Eurodistrict of Basel
- Øresund Region also known as Greater Copenhagen and Skåne Region

They may be established:

- by a simple agreement about common projects in the area;
- in a more institutionalised manner by a local association for transfrontier or cross-border cooperation (in French: groupement local de coopération transfrontalière or GLCT), which can draw up plans for transfrontier cooperation between towns or communes; or
- with an even greater degree of institutionalisation, perhaps including structures allowing a transfer of power and elected by all district citizens. This has constitutional implications for the individual countries involved, which have to be taken into account when drawing up agreements.

Note that transfrontier cooperation methods between regions known as euroregions exist in parallel to eurodistricts, which are generally urban. Furthermore, a eurodistrict can be located within a euroregion and even have certain connections with it.

== See also ==
- France–Germany relations
- Euroregion
