= Bus transport in France =

Transport Organizing Authority in France

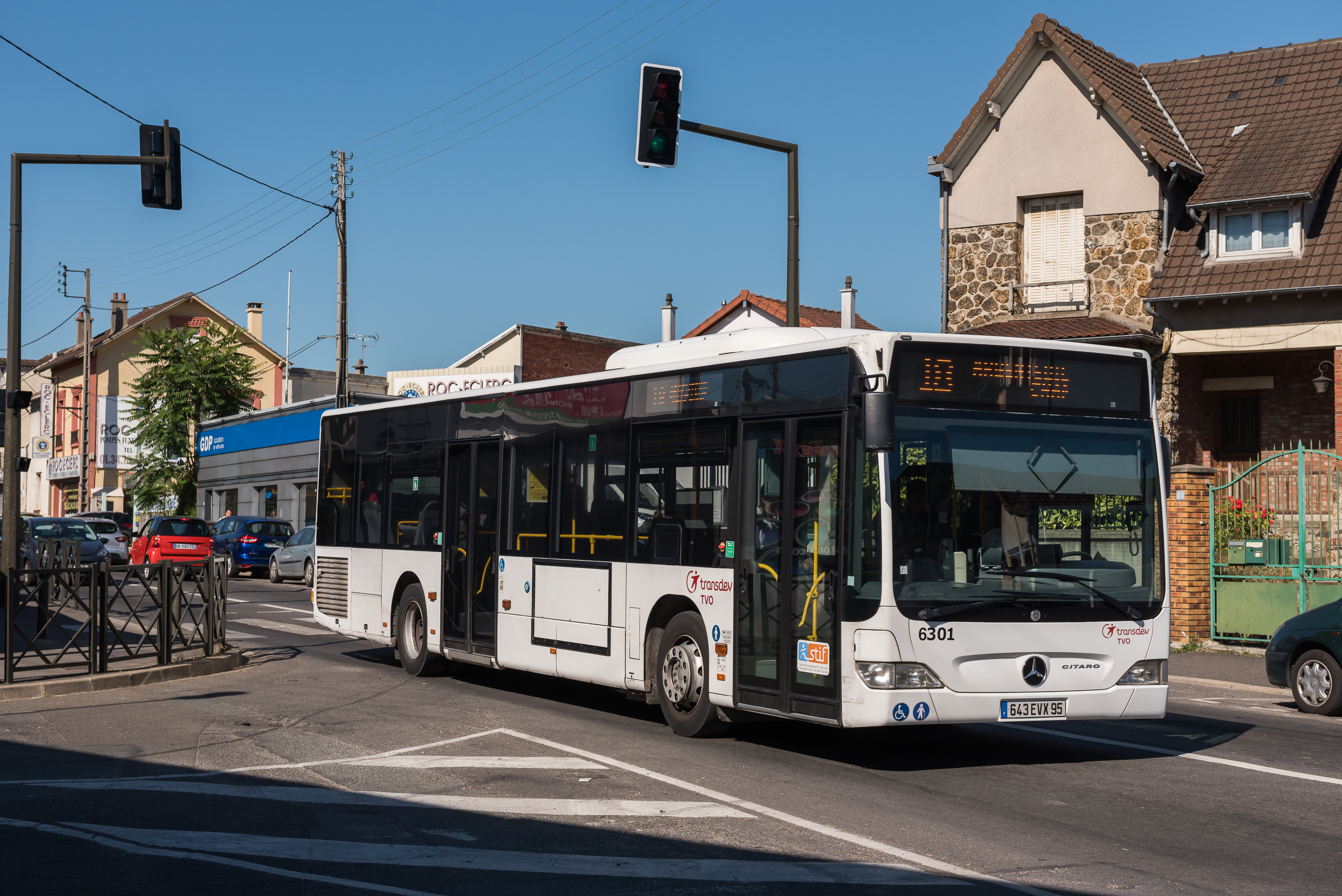
A Mercedes bus at Argenteuil

In France, the vast majority of bus services are provided by the local Autorité Organisatrice de Transports (AOT) or Transport Organising Authority. Urban Transport Organizing Authorities. This is most commonly the commune, or the département where settlements are not large enough to require their own bus services. In Paris, the RATP run bus services.

Buses can be directly operated la régie by the AOT, or contracted out as a délégation de service public (delegated public service) which allows the private sector to operate buses on behalf of the AOT.

Fares outside of the RATP region generally cover approximately 16% of running costs, with the remainder of costs met by the Versement Transport - a tax levied on employees collected directly from all businesses with at least 10 employees, and a mixture of other local taxes and loans.

Intercity buses are fully liberalised and run by the private sector in direct competition with the regional and intercity railways.

== History ==
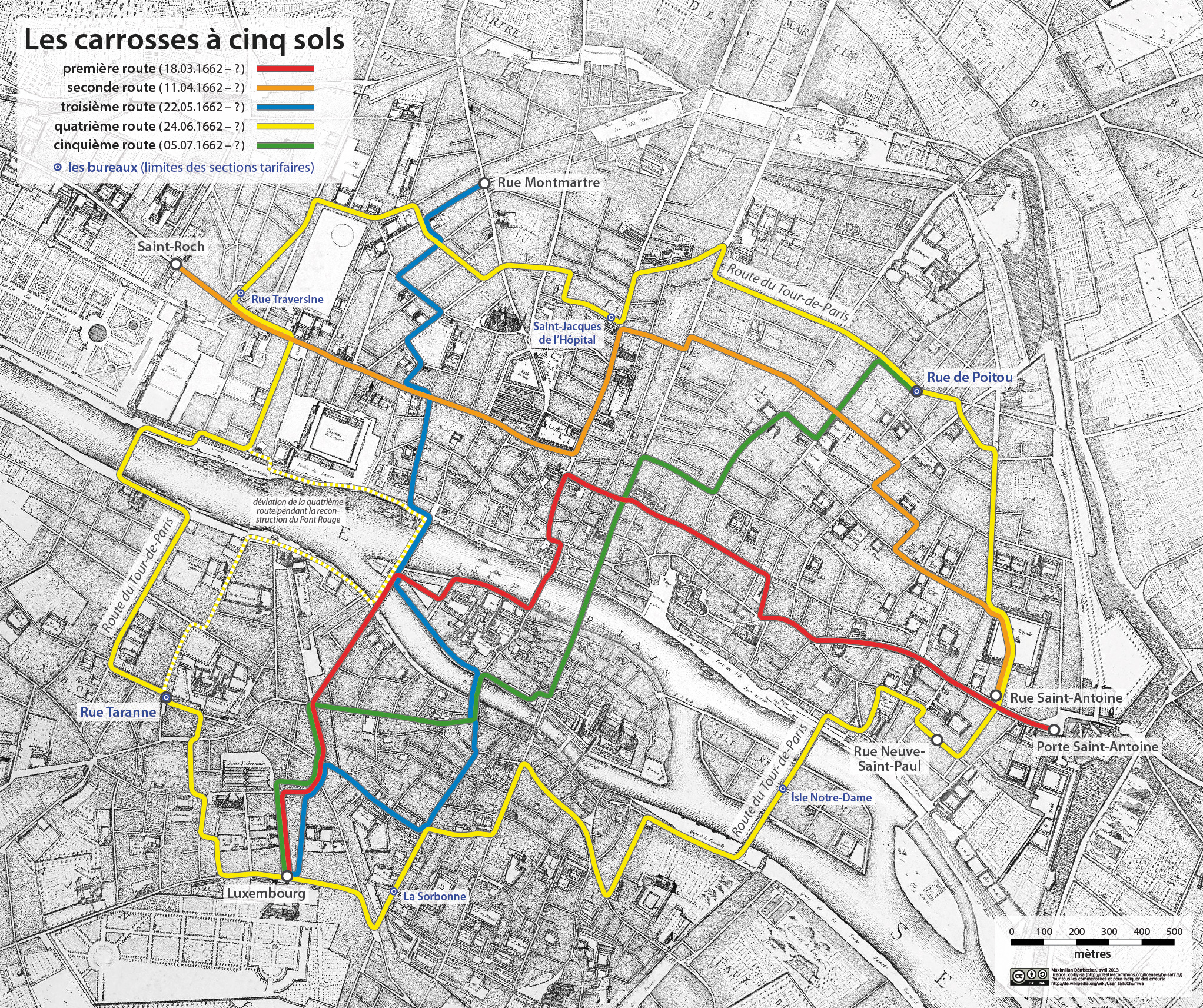
Network plan of the carrosses à cinq sols or five-sol carriages.

An early attempt to establish a bus service was made by Blaise Pascal in 1662. He was granted a monopoly by King Louis XIV on petition to establish the service in the city of Paris - the Carrosses à cinq sols. A network of five routes were established and the service was initially popular, however the Parlement intervened to limit the class of permitted passengers to the bourgeoise and "people of merit" - excluding craftsmen, pages and soldiers. This network lasted until around 1677.

In 1824, Stanislas Baudry established the first bus service in France in Nantes. The term "bus" in English originates from "omnibus" which means "for all" in Latin, and supplanted the word "stagecoach" in English. The distinction between the two being that no prior booking was required, which meant anyone could board and pay, rather than only those who had pre-booked travel. In 1826, Baudry established l'Entreprise générale des omnibus (EGO) in Paris, with the permission of the Prefect of Police. This enterprise was so successful that by 1829 there were up to thirty different bus companies operating in Paris, who were free to set routes and timetables, although the authorities set the fares.

The laissez-faire arrangement ended in 1854 as Haussmann, the Prefect of the Seine department forcibly merged all incumbent operators in Paris into the Compagnie Générale des Omnibus - the General Omnibus Company (CGO). This took effect in February 1855 in readiness for the 1855 Paris Exposition; France's attempt to outshine the London Exhibition of 1851. The extreme overcrowding of omnibuses at the London Exhibition could be avoided by this measure. The CGO were granted a 30-year monopoly by emperor Napoleon III in exchange for an annual fee of 640,000 Francs, plus a 1000 Franc surcharge per omnibus above the initial 350.

=== Motorisation ===
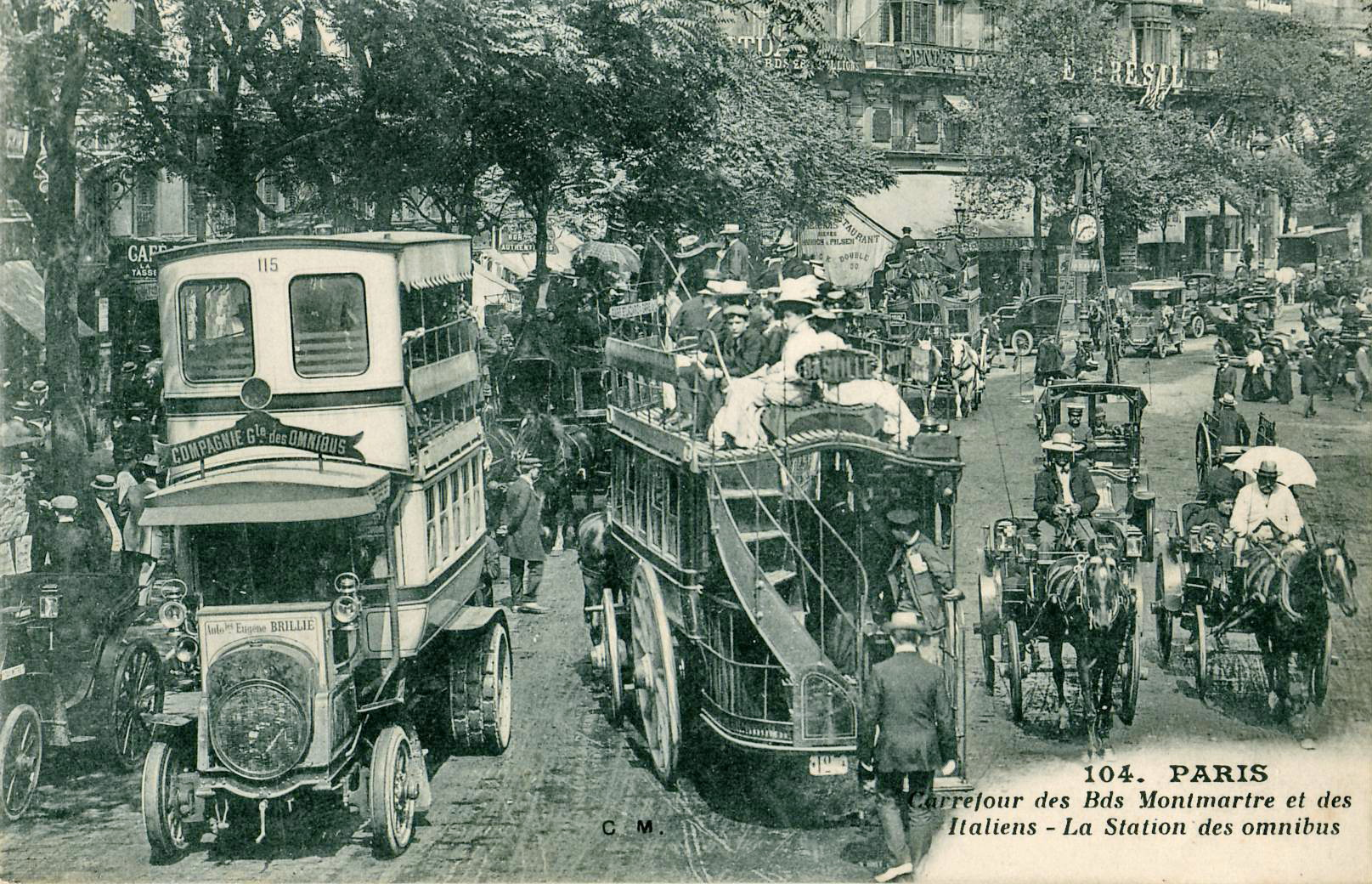
Two French double-decker impériale buses. The left being a CGO autobus, the bus in the centre being horse-drawn. The upper deck of the omnibus has a "knifeboard" seating arrangement which is completely exposed to weather. The autobus on the left has a roofed upper saloon and windows at the front but is exposed at the sides.

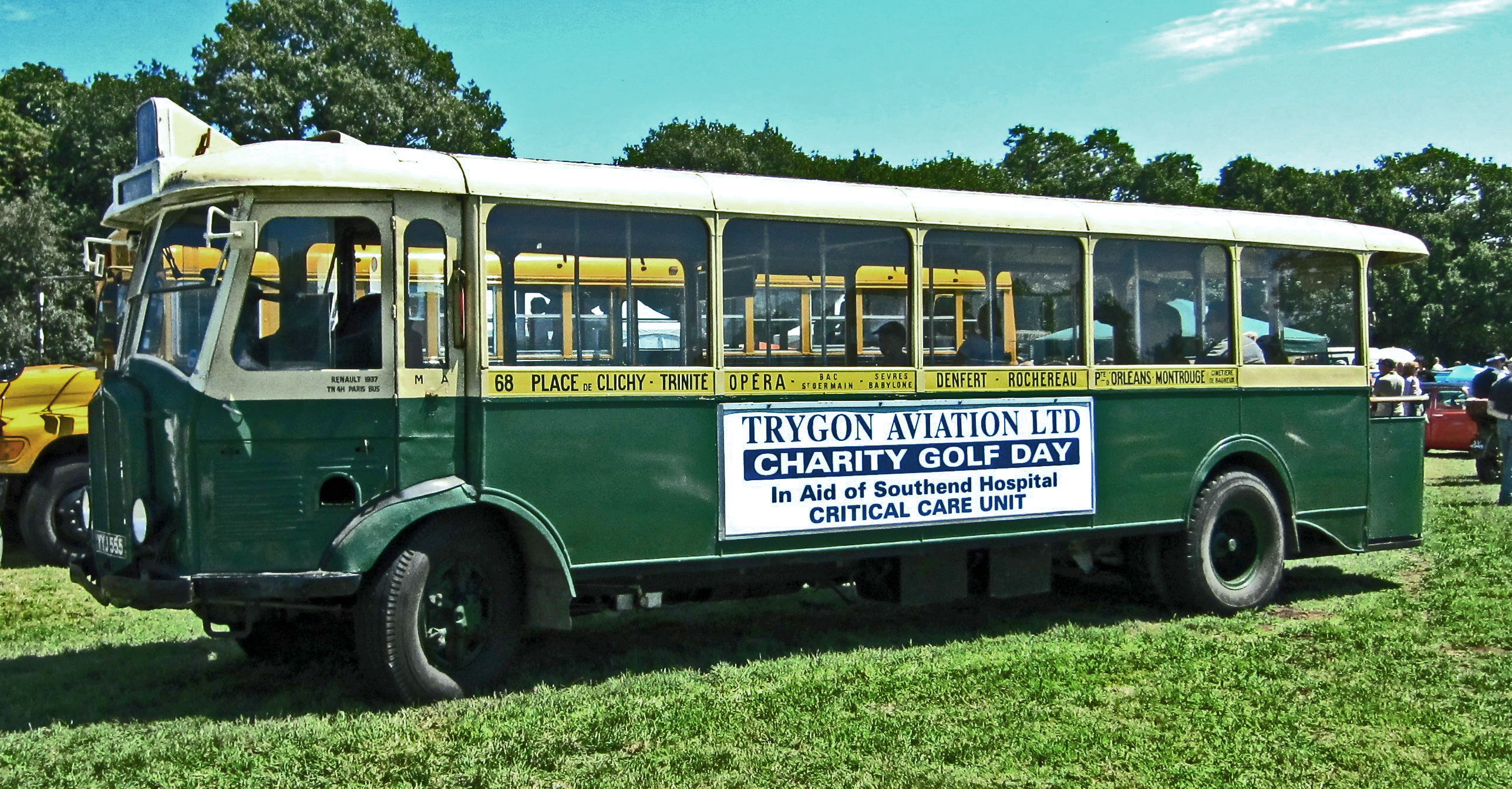
A Renault TN autobus, of the historic Parisian buses with an open platform or terrasse at the rear.

Horse-drawn omnibuses were replaced by the autobus - the term in use in France today. The prefix Auto referring to the vehicle being "self" powered by the onboard motor, rather than being a horse-drawn carriage. The last omnibus in Paris was withdrawn on 12 January 1913.

After the First World War, the CGO as well as other modes of transport in Paris were financially exhausted and were purchased by the Seine Department in 1921.

=== Nationalisation ===
Buses were negatively impacted by postwar shortages of materials for vehicles, fuel, and parts however, there was significant expansion of buses until the early 1960s when more interest and public investment went into cars, parking and motorways. In 1950, the politically important railway workforce sought to protect the railways by preventing any competition from the long-distance buses or coaches which lasted for 65 years.

=== Public Service Reforms ===
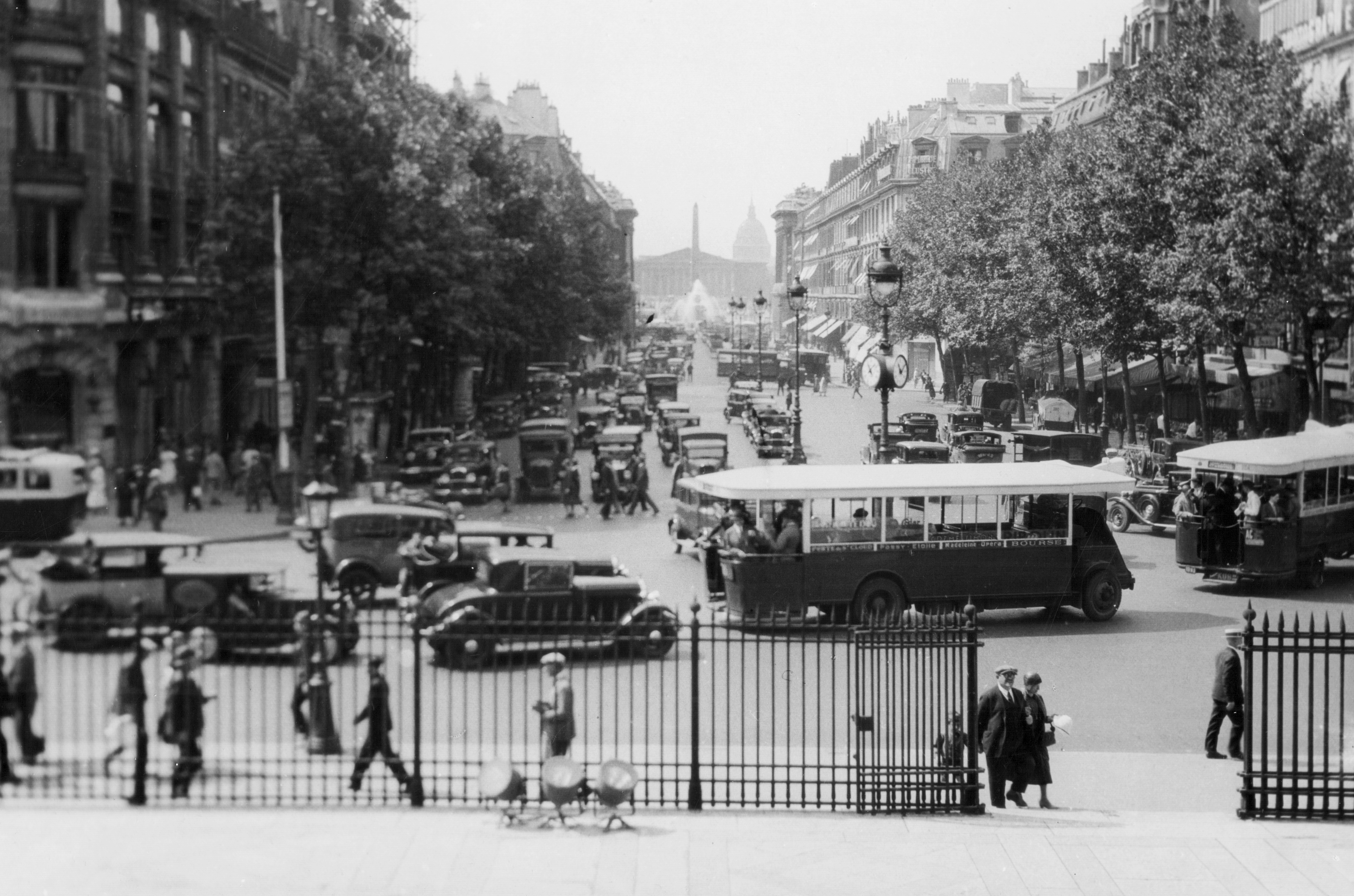
Two autobuses and other traffic in Paris, 1931

In 1949, the incoming Radical-Socialist government nationalised the GOC into the RATP along with all other public transport in Paris.

In 1966, the RATP decided to trial double-decker impériale buses, with 25 entering service in 1968. The upper saloon was underutilised on the trial routes, as the distance travelled was too short for many passengers to bother climbing the stairs, the vehicles often struck the trees on the boulevards, startling passengers or breaking windows, and space taken by the staircases negating the purported advantages of impériale buses which were underutilised. The trial in Paris ended in 1977 with no further use except for tour buses.

In 1993, the French government passed the Loi Sapin which was designed to reduce corruption in the awarding of public sector contracts, including bus concessions.

In the year 2000, public transport in the Paris region was devolved from the Préfet of the central government to the Paris region.

Since 2010, an alternative to la régie (direct operation) was enabled; the société publique locale (arms-length company) option. This is where the bus operator is legally constituted as a company under French law, which is fully owned by the AOT.

In 2015, long-distance bus services were deregulated by the Loi Macron, named after its enactor, Emmanuel Macron in his role as Economy Minister before his election to the Presidency. The main purpose of liberalisation was to provide alternatives to intercity rail travel in France. in 2022, the French Government banned domestic short-haul flights where there is a parallel railway connection.

== Service Types ==
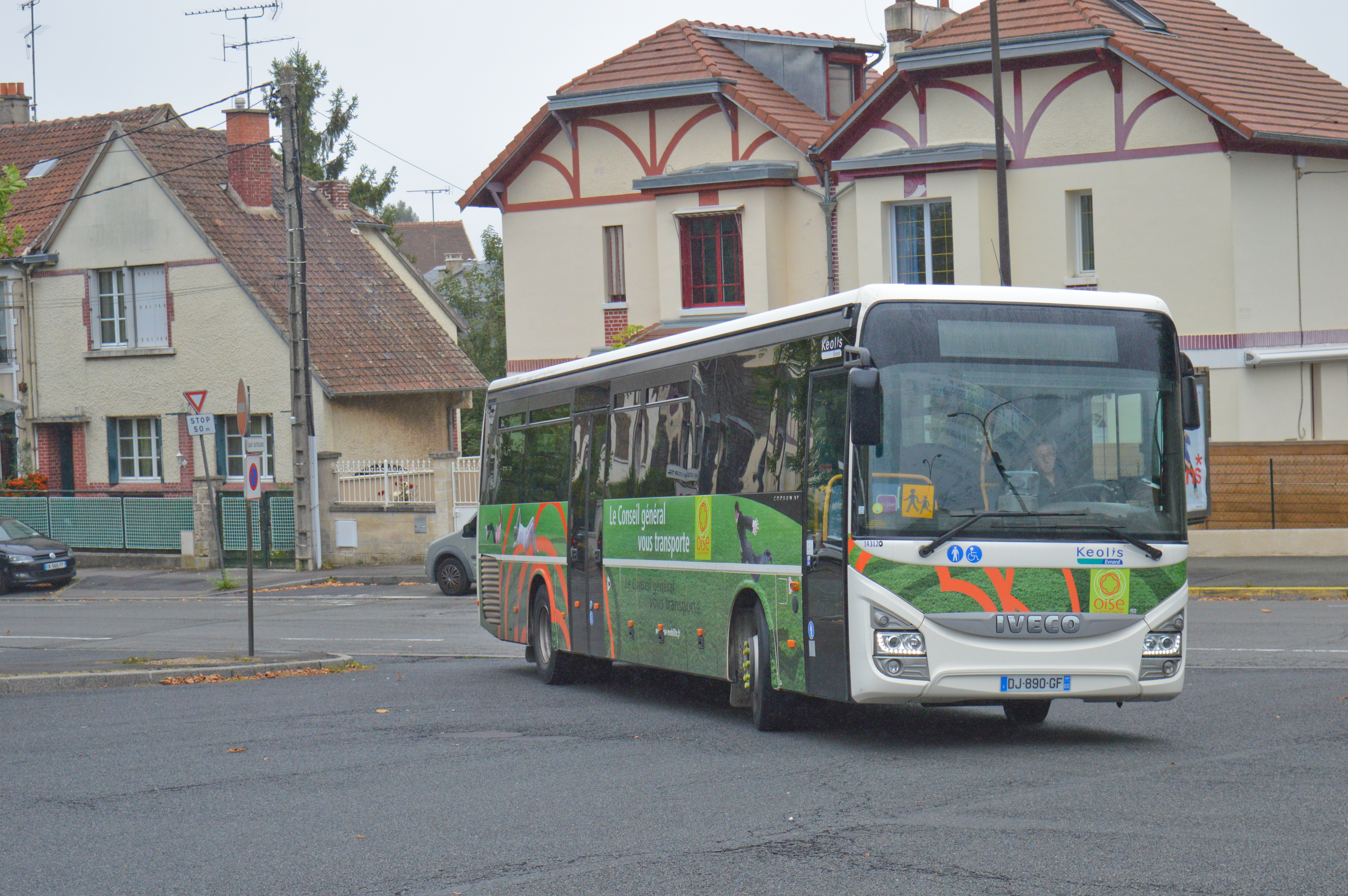
A bus arriving at Chantilly bus station

=== Urban bus services ===
Bus transport in France is provided at a flat-rate charge, with inner city services operate well out into the suburbs and the countryside. However, rural services are limited.

In most, if not all, French cities, urban bus services are provided at a flat-rate charge for individual journeys. Many cities have bus services that operate well out into the suburbs or even the country. Fares are normally cheap, but rural services can be limited, especially on weekends.

=== Inter-city buses ===
Trains have long had a monopoly on inter-regional buses, but in 2015 the French government introduced Macron's Law that has allowed bus operators to transport passengers on any routes.

=== Private Hire ===
Many bus companies in France offer private hire in addition to operating scheduled bus routes and bus tours. Bus rental is concentrated mainly around major cities such as Paris or Lyon, but it is also possible to rent a bus in other tourist destinations, especially in the Côte d'Azur region and in cities such as Marseille or Nice. These buses are usually equipped with all the necessary amenities for long-distance travel, and also have English-speaking staff to manage charter services.

=== Shuttle Buses ===
known as navéttes, these will transport passengers between hubs, such as train stations and airports, universities etc.

== Bus Manufacturers ==
Power Vehicle Innovation

Société des usines Chausson

Heuliez Bus

Iveco bus (formerly Irisbus)

== See also ==
- RATP Bus Network
- Transport in France
