= Rue Foyatier =

Street in Paris, France

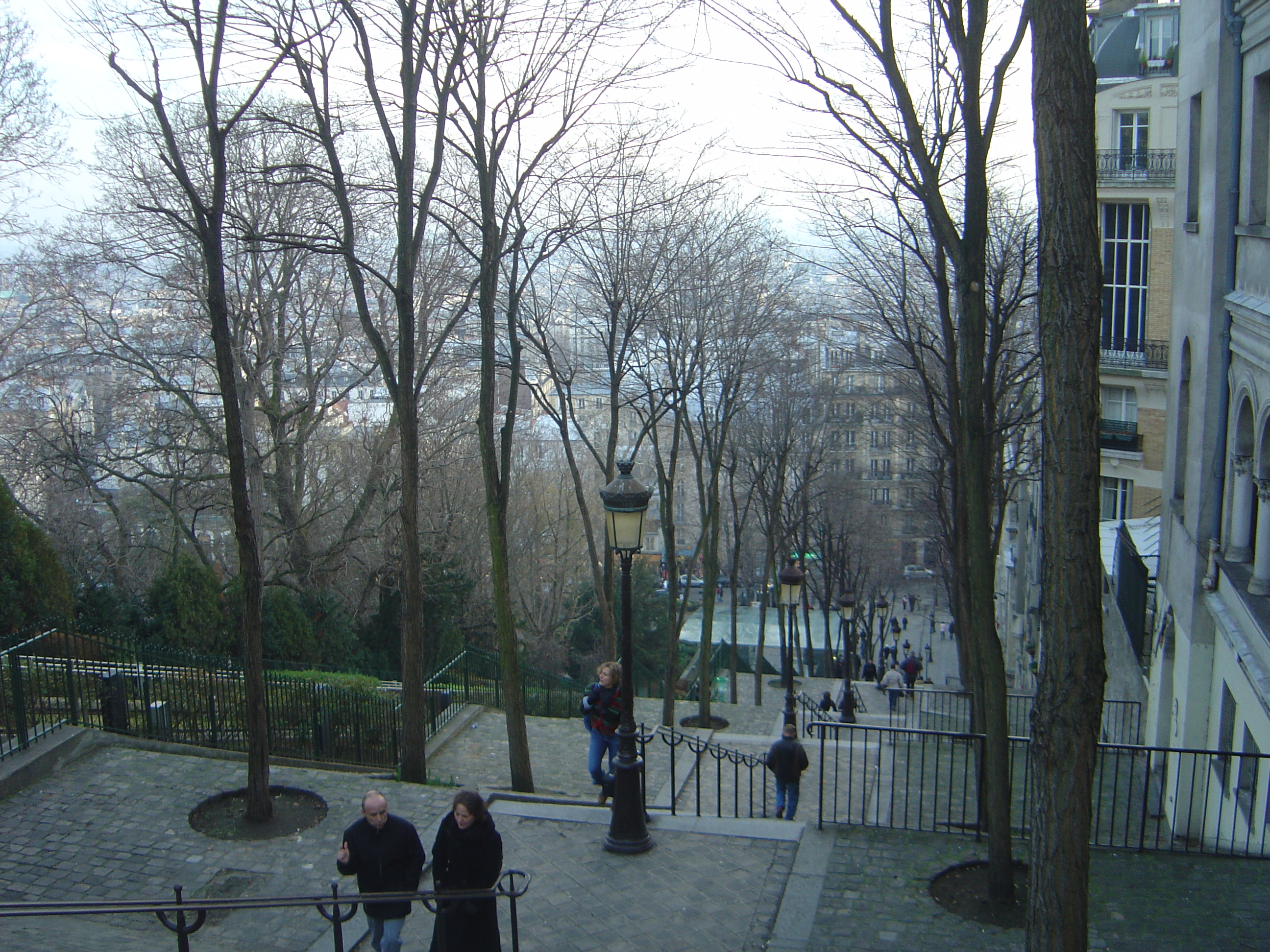
- The Rue Foyatier from the Rue Saint-Eleuthère and Rue du Cardinal-Dubois

- Location within Paris
- Length: 100 m (330 ft)
- Width: 12 m (39 ft)
- Arrondissement: 18th
- Quarter: Clignancourt
- Coordinates: 48.8852°N 2.3424°E
- From: rue André Barsacq
- To: rue Saint-Eleuthère

Construction
- Completion: 1867
- Denomination: 1875

The Rue Foyatier is a street on the Montmartre butte ("outlier"), in the 18th arrondissement of Paris. Opened in 1867, it was given its current name in 1875, after the sculptor Denis Foyatier (1793–1863). One of the most famous streets in Paris, it consists of flights of stairs giving access to the top of the hill, the Sacré-Cœur Basilica, and the other attractions of the upper-Montmartre neighborhood. The Montmartre funicular runs alongside it.

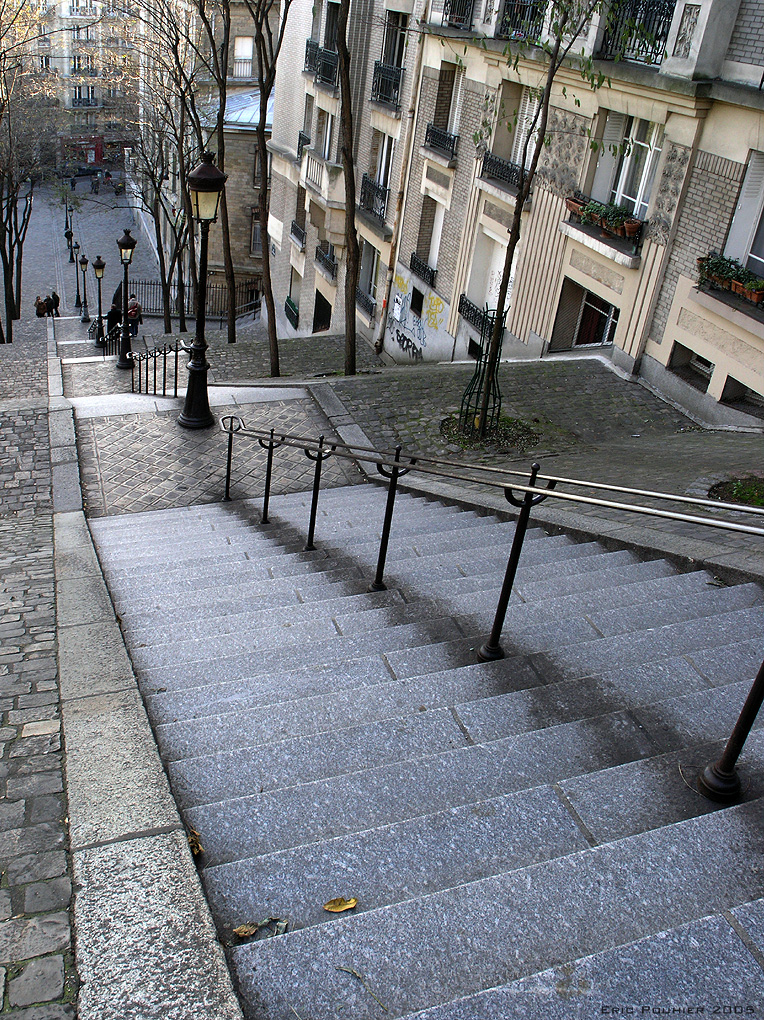
The stairs of the Rue Foyatier

== In popular culture ==
The stairs of Rue Foyatier figure prominently in the 1974 film Celine and Julie Go Boating and the 2023 film John Wick: Chapter 4.
