= Transit district =

Type of government agency

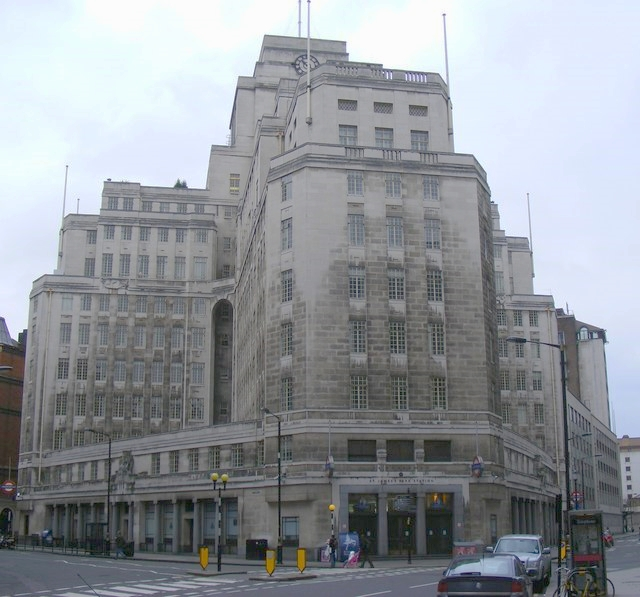
55 Broadway, headquarters of Transport for London 1929-2020

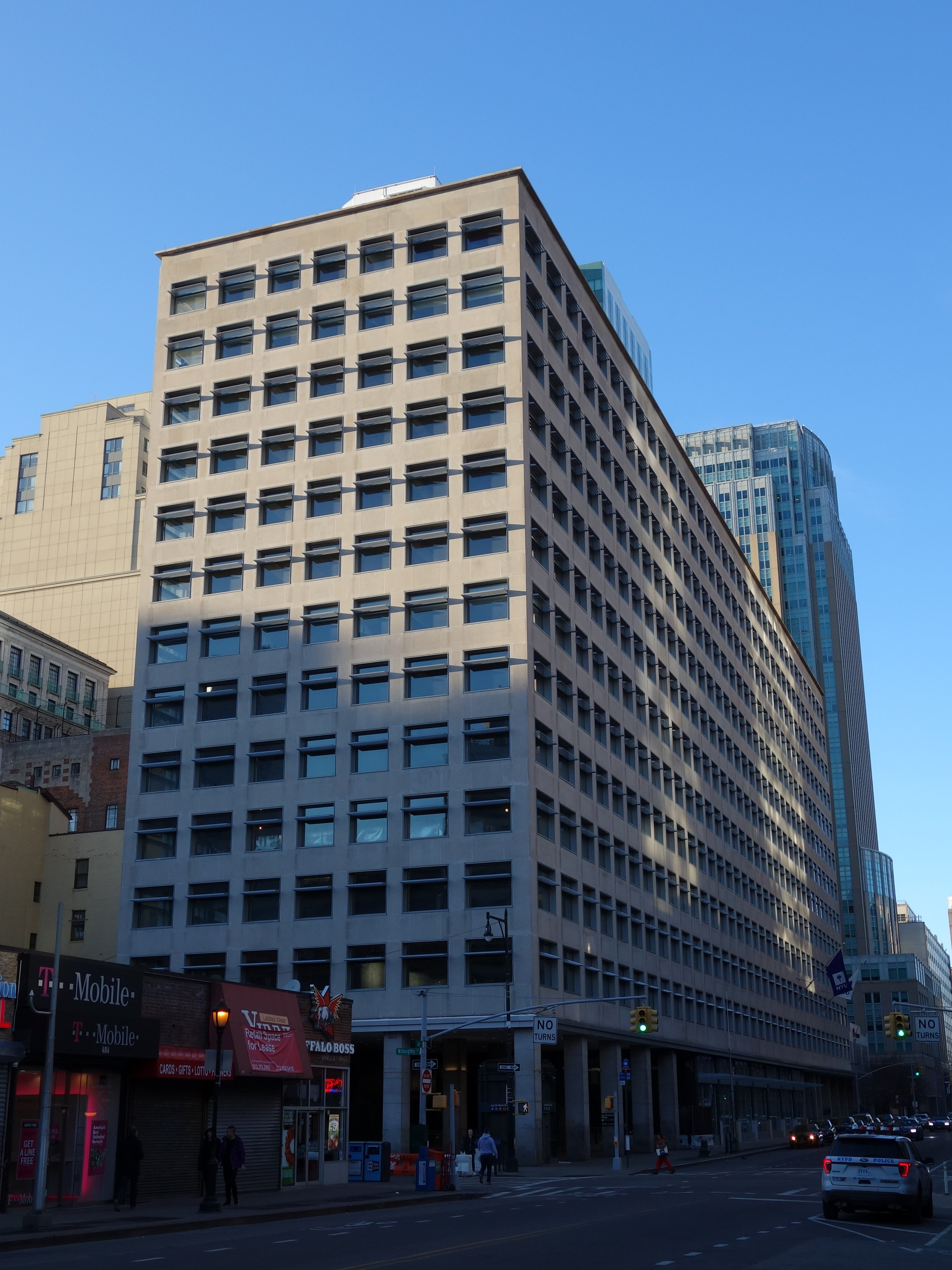
370 Jay Street headquarters of New York City Transit Authority 1951-2012

A transit district or transit authority is a government agency or a public-benefit corporation created for the purpose of providing public transportation within a specific region.

A transit district may operate bus, rail, ferry services, or other types of transport. In some cases, the transit district may be part of a larger organization, such as a state or provincial department of transportation.

== Australia ==
Translink manages buses, trains, and ferries in South East Queensland, Australia.

== Austria ==
Austria has seven transport associations covering its nine federal states: six states each have their own association, while Vienna, Lower Austria, and Burgenland share a single body, the Verkehrsverbund Ost-Region.

== Canada ==
In Canada, transit (or transport or transportation) is mostly the domain of local government, with some coordination by the provinces. Most Canadian cities have a transit authority.

== France ==
In France, an autorité organisatrice de transports (transport organisation authority), usually abbreviated AOT, is one of the local government bodies implementing the 1982 law for the organisation of transportation in France.

An example is Île-de-France Mobilités that supervises transport in the Île de France region.

== Germany ==
As part of the deregulation package passed by the Bundestag in 1993, which merged the two state railways of West and East Germany into one single company governed by private law instead of public law, regional transport and transit had been assigned to the Bundesländer (federal states). Each state had to pass its own laws regulating public transit, whereby "regional" was defined as journeys "typically not over distances more than 50 km (30 mi), and not taking longer than one hour".

== Sweden ==
Providing public transit is the joint responsibility of the local county and municipal governments, per the Public Transportation Act (2010:1065). Transit is most often organised on the county level, but in the sparsely populated north, some municipalities opt to run a city bus network separated from the county network.

Some counties opt to run joint commuter train networks. In the north, this is also done with coaches.

== United Kingdom ==
Transport for London (which operates the London Underground, London Overground, DLR, London Buses, and the Elizabeth line, among other public transportation modes) is the transit authority responsible for public transport in Greater London. The Oyster card electronic payment method is also operated by Transport for London, and can be used on most of the transport network in the city.

Many other large municipalities have similar bodies (e.g. Transport for Greater Manchester), which are collectively termed passenger transport executives.

== United States ==
In the United States, a transit district is a special-purpose district organized either as a corporation chartered by statute or as a government agency. A district is usually contained within one state, but in rare circumstances may cover two or more states. The term used depends on which part of the country the agency is created in. Typically, western states will create a "transit district," and eastern states create a "transit authority," but the type of agency is generally the same.

A transit district is created to give it the power of the government in solving problems related to transit issues. This includes the powers of eminent domain to obtain space for rights-of-way (e.g. for railways or busways), the ability to impose excise, income, property, and/or sales taxes to fund subsidies of operating costs of local transportation, and the ability to operate independently of the cities and counties within which the transit district operates. A transit district may also have its own transit police force, although in some areas the local police provide a special bureau for this purpose.

Some of the largest transit districts in the U.S. include:

- The Metropolitan Transportation Authority (MTA), serving 12 counties in southeastern New York state, including New York City, along with two counties in southwestern Connecticut under contract to the Connecticut Department of Transportation;
- The New York City Transit Authority which operates New York City's subway trains and municipal buses;
- The Port Authority of New York and New Jersey, which operates New York City's Port Authority Bus Terminal and the Port Authority Trans-Hudson (PATH) trains, and was the owner of the World Trade Center complex;
- The Washington Metropolitan Area Transit Authority, which operates the bus and Metrorail system in Washington, D.C., and suburban Maryland and Virginia;
- The former Southern California Rapid Transit District, which operated most of the bus systems in Los Angeles County, California as well as parts of Orange, Riverside and San Bernardino counties from August 18, 1964, until April 1, 1993, when it was converted into the Los Angeles County Metropolitan Transportation Authority;
- The Chicago Transit Authority, which operates all bus routes that run within the boundaries of Chicago, as well as the Chicago 'L';
- The Central Puget Sound Regional Transit Authority, shortened to Sound Transit (ST), which operates Sounder (commuter rail), Link (light rail), and ST Express bus service in the Seattle metropolitan area;
- The Utah Transit Authority (UTA), which operates the FrontRunner (commuter rail), TRAX (light rail), and bus service along the Wasatch Front (Salt Lake-Odgen-Provo metropolitan area);

== See also ==
- Journey planner
- Passenger transport executive
- Sustainable transport
- Transit pass
