= Denis Foyatier =

French sculptor (1793–1863)

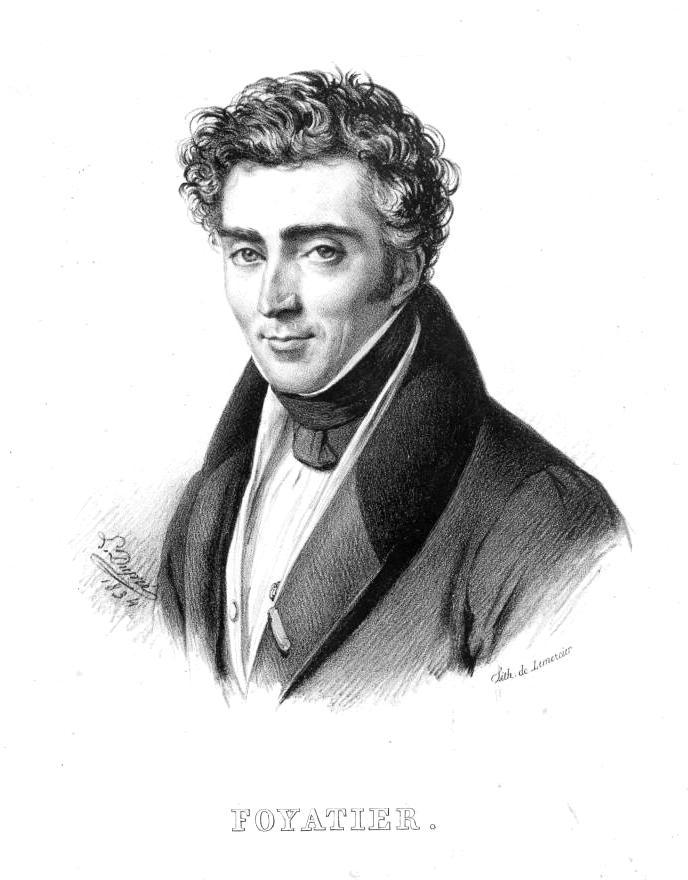
- Born: 21 September 1793; Bussières, Loire
- Died: 19 November 1863 (aged 70); Paris
- Education: École nationale supérieure des beaux-arts, Paris; French Academy in Rome
- Known for: Sculpture
- Notable work: Spartacus
- Movement: Neoclassicism

Denis Foyatier (21 September 1793 at Bussières, Loire – 19 November 1863 at Paris) was a French sculptor in the neoclassical style.

== Biography ==
Foyatier was the child of a family of modest means (his father was a weaver and later a farmer at Bezin, a hamlet near Bussières, Loire). He started by working on religious figures, while taking a design course at Lyon. In 1817, he entered the École nationale supérieure des beaux-arts ("National Higher School for Arts and Crafts") in Paris. In 1819 he exhibited his first pieces and, aged 26, was awarded a scholarship for the French Academy in Rome at the Villa Médicis.

At the Villa Médicis he created the mould for his piece Spartacus, which is very well known. A Royal Command of 1828 for a production in marble made him famous.

After a brilliant career as a sculptor and painter, he died on 19 November 1863 and is buried in the Petit-Clamart cemetery in a suburb of Paris.

Some of Foyatier's works have been lost; several were melted down during the Second World War.

He was the father-in-law of the sculptor Jules Blanchard and the oceanographer Julien Thoulet.

== Places ==
Several towns have named streets after him:

- Paris: The Rue Foyatier in 18th arrondissement, a set of flights of steps leading to the Sacré-Cœur Basilica, alongside the Montmartre funicular.
- Roanne
- Saint-Étienne

and some smaller communes in the Loire department:

- Bussières, a square at the edge of the village in the Pouilly-lès-Feurs direction.
- Feurs

== Works ==
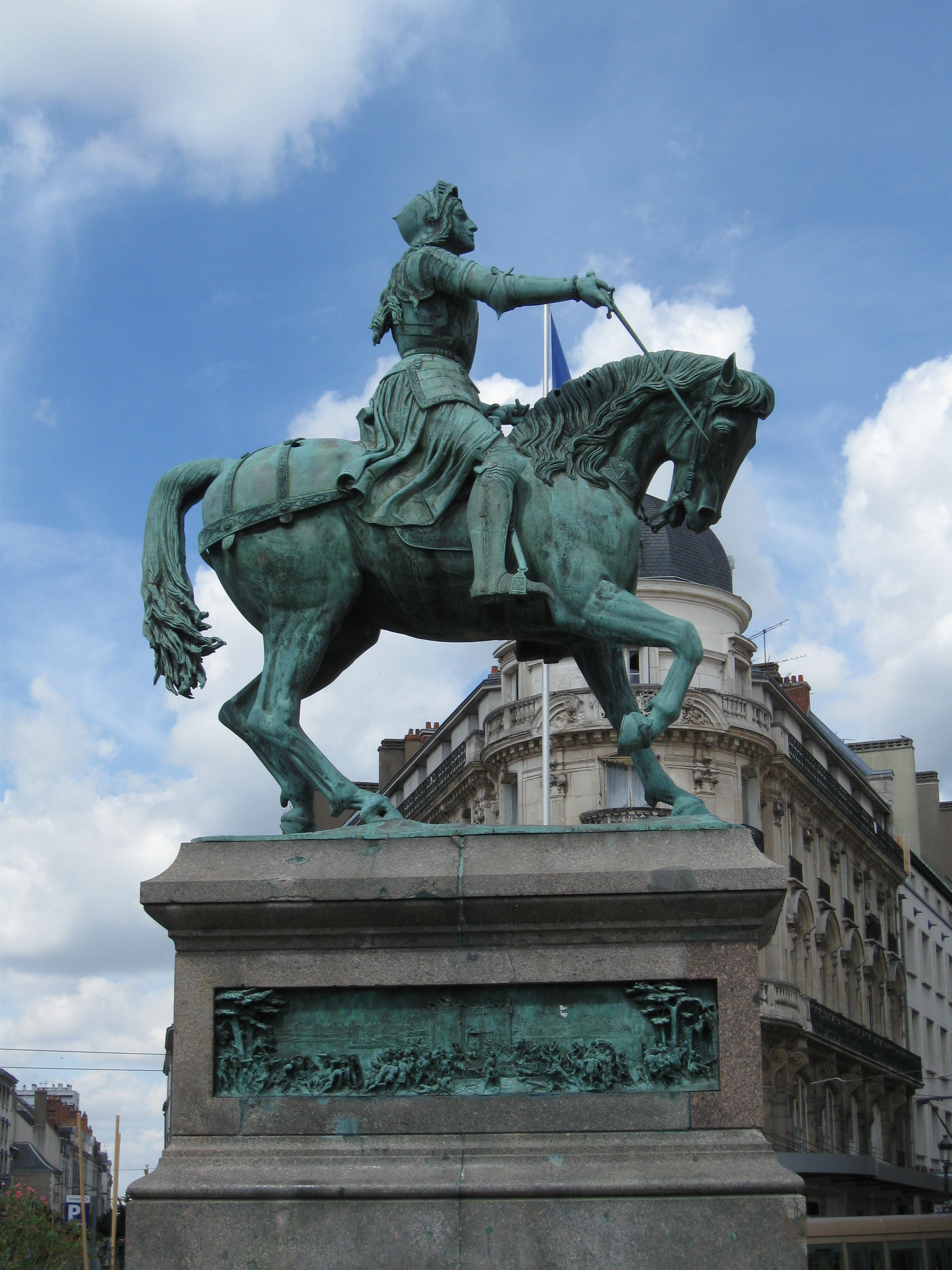
Statue of Joan of Arc in the Place du Martroi, Orléans

- L'Amour ("Love") (1825), statue, marble, Paris, Musée du Louvre.
- Spartacus (1830), Larger-than-life statue, marble, Paris, Musée du Louvre: Originally (1831) erected in an ensemble of eight statues for l'allée des grands hommes ("Avenue of Great Men") in the Jardin des Tuileries, the statue represents Spartacus breaking his chains, and was moved to the Louvre in 1877. Fanny Lewald intimated that Foyatier's Spartacus was modeled after the pianist and composer Franz Liszt. (Zwölf Bilder nach den Leben, p. 337).
- Cincinnatus (1832–1834), statue, marble, Paris, erected in the Jardin des Tuileries in 1836 near a large round pond, this statue also was one of the des grands hommes series.
- La Sieste (1848), statue, marble, Paris, Musée du Louvre
- Étienne Pasquier, jurisconsulte ("jurist"), statue, Paris, Jardin du Luxembourg, to the left of the Palais du Luxembourg.
- La Foi ("The fool"), statue, stone or marble, Paris, Église de Notre-Dame-de-Lorette, to the right and below the frontage.
- Saint Matthieu ("Saint Matthew"), statue, stone, Place Franz-Liszt, façade of the Église Saint-Vincent-de-Paul de Paris, balustrade.
- La Pucelle d'Orléans ("The Maid of Orleans"), enormous equestrian statue (4.40 m (14 ft 5 in) high) of Joan of Arc, bronze, erected 1855 in the Place du Martroi in Orléans.
- Les derniers jours d'Herculaneum ("The last days of Herculaneum" (?)), 2.65 m (8 ft 8 in) bronze in the Jardin des Olives of the abbot's palace at Remiremont. Destroyed in 1942.
- Saint Christophe ("Saint Christopher"), in "golden and multicoloured wood", at Néronde, Loire.
- La Prudence, marble, at the Chambre of Deputies (Palais Bourbon) in Paris.
- Saint Philippe ("Philip"), Saint Barthélémy ("Bartholomew"), Saint Thomas ("Thomas"), Saint Mathieu ("Matthew") at the Église de la Madeleine in Paris.
- La Vierge à l'Enfant ("Virgin and Child") at the Église Saint-Etienne-du-Mont in Paris.
- Le Maréchal de la Palice, Olivier de Clisson, L'Abbé Suger at Versailles.
- Saint Marc ("Mark") at Arras.
- Le Colonel Michel Combes at Feurs.
- Buste de la Duchesse d'Angoulême (recent donations room) at the Musée des-Beaux Arts at Lyon.
- A maenad (Lyonnaise room) at the Musée des Beaux-Arts at Lyon.
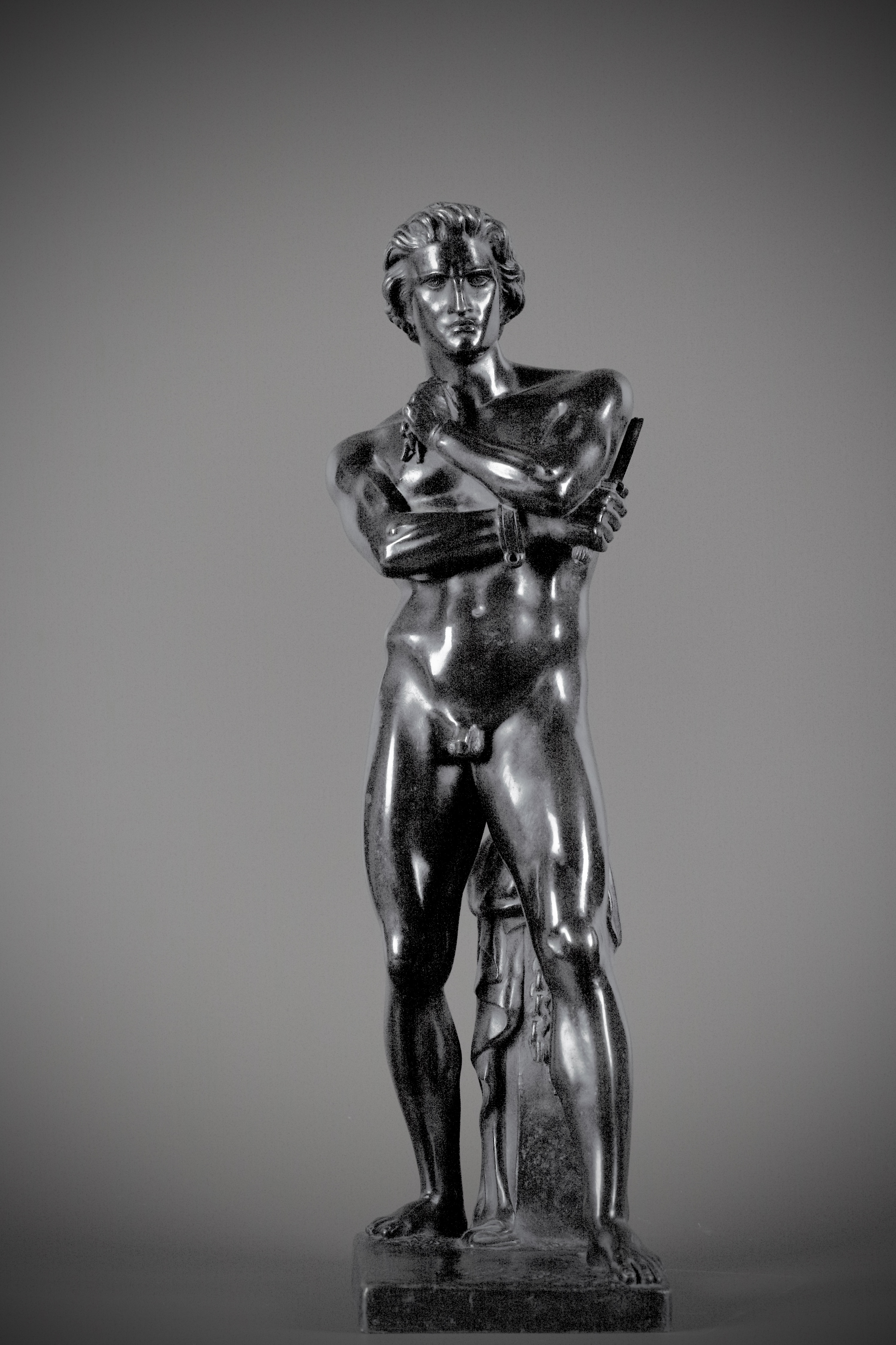
Spartacus, Sand cast bronze, Private Collection, Paris.

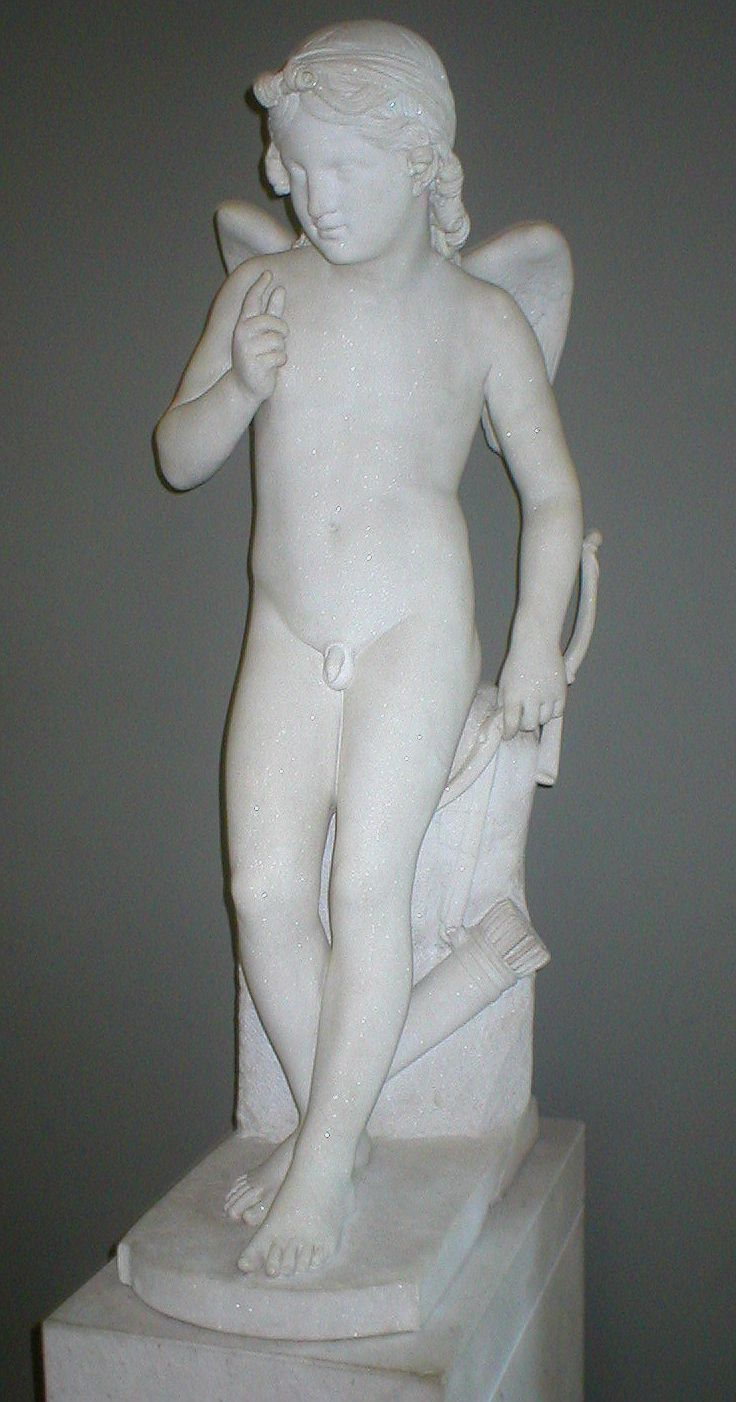
l'Amour, Musée du Louvre

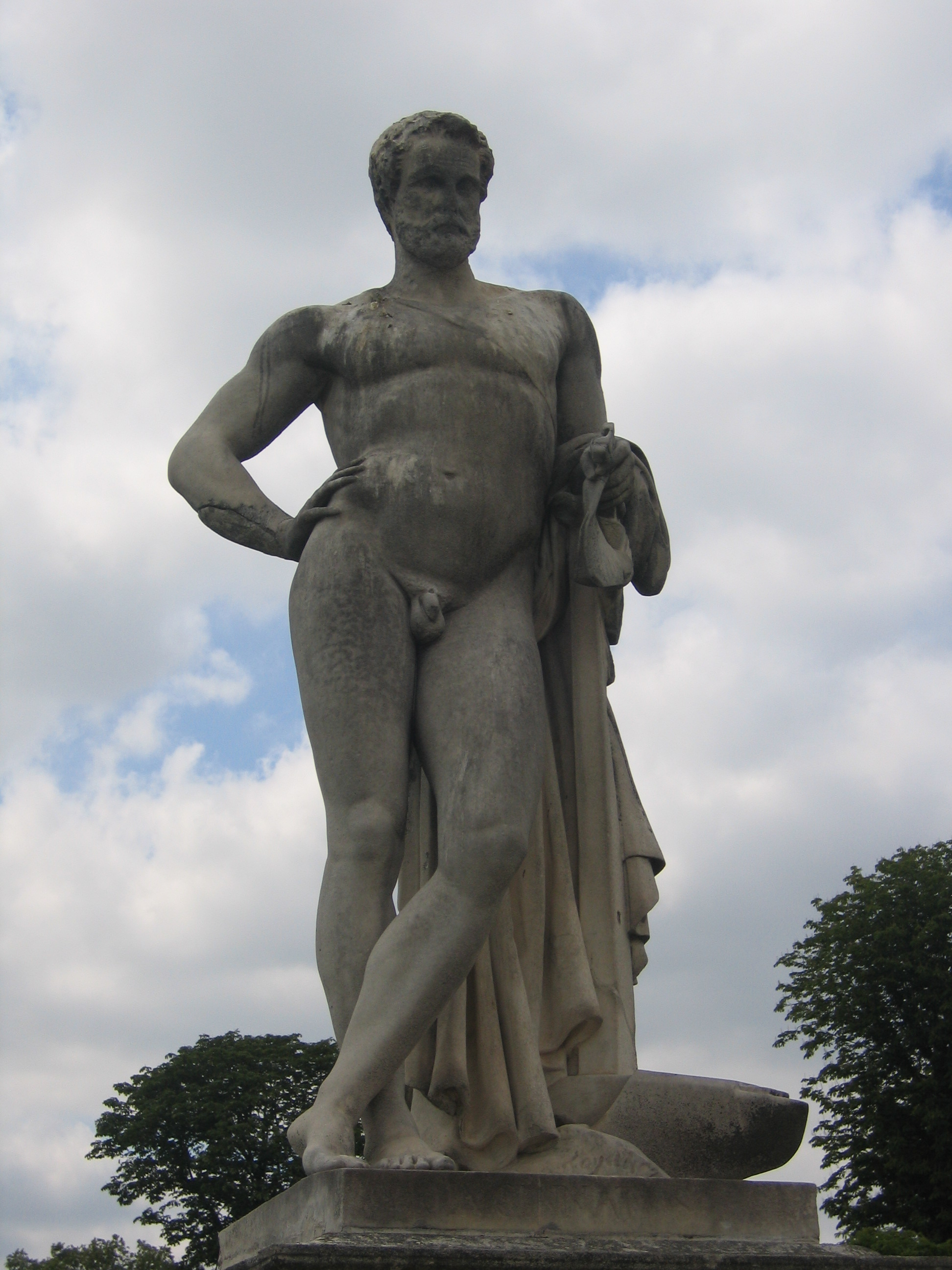
Cincinnatus, Jardin des Tuileries

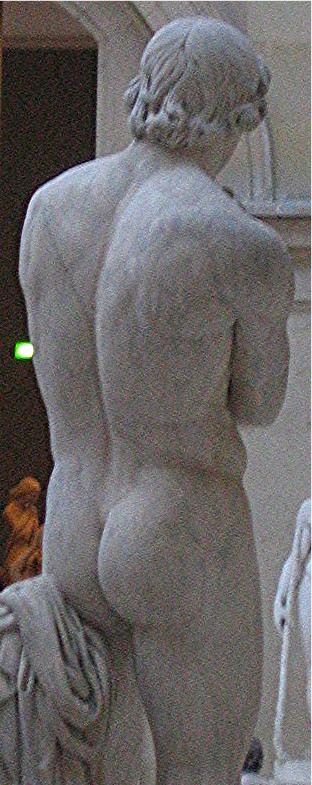
Spartacus, detail

== Sources ==
- Kjellberg, Pierre (1988). Le Nouveau guide des statues de Paris [New Guide to Paris Statues] (in French). Paris: La Bibliothèque des Arts.
