= François Deslaugiers =

French architect

- Born: 3 December 1934; Algiers, French Algeria
- Died: 18 December 2009 (aged 15); Marseille, France
- Education: École nationale supérieure des beaux-arts
- Occupation: Architect
- Buildings: Nanterre Palace of Justice

François Deslaugiers (3 December 1934 at Algiers – 18 December 2009 at Marseille) was a French architect.

== Education ==
After leaving school, Deslaugiers undertook khâgne (second year studies) at the Paris schools Lycée Janson-de-Sailly and then Lycée Henri-IV. In 1952, he entered the École nationale supérieure des beaux-arts, studying under Guy Lagneau, then from 1964 under Louis Arretche. He graduated in 1966.

== Career ==
After graduating, Deslaughiers worked with his erstwhile teacher, Louis Arretche.

He was president of the Association of Tours Labourdettes in the Canton of Marseille-Belsunce, where he lived.

== Works ==
- 1981: Nemours tax centre
- 1984–1989: Façades, lifts and pit of the Arche de la Défense (concept and execution on behalf of Johann Otto von Spreckelsen and Paul Andreu)
- 1991: Upper and lower stations of the Montmartre funicular
- 1994: Storage rooms of the Musée des arts et métiers, Saint-Denis
- 1994: New auditorium at Orléans
- 1994: Le Corbusier Viaduct at Lille
- 1994: Red entryway at Rennes
- 1996: Nanterre Palace of Justice
- 1998: Planning of the Museum of Asiatic Arts at Nice (in a building by Kenzo Tange)
- 2000: Planning of the chapel of the Musée des arts et métiers (rgenerated by Andrea Bruno)
- 2000: Entry route of Montmajour Abbey, near Arles (renovation by Rudy Ricciotti)
- 2002: Bridge at the Gare de Lille-Flandres
