= Montmartre Funicular =

Funicular railway serving the Montmartre neighbourhood of Paris, France

Coordinates: 48°53′07″N 2°20′33″E

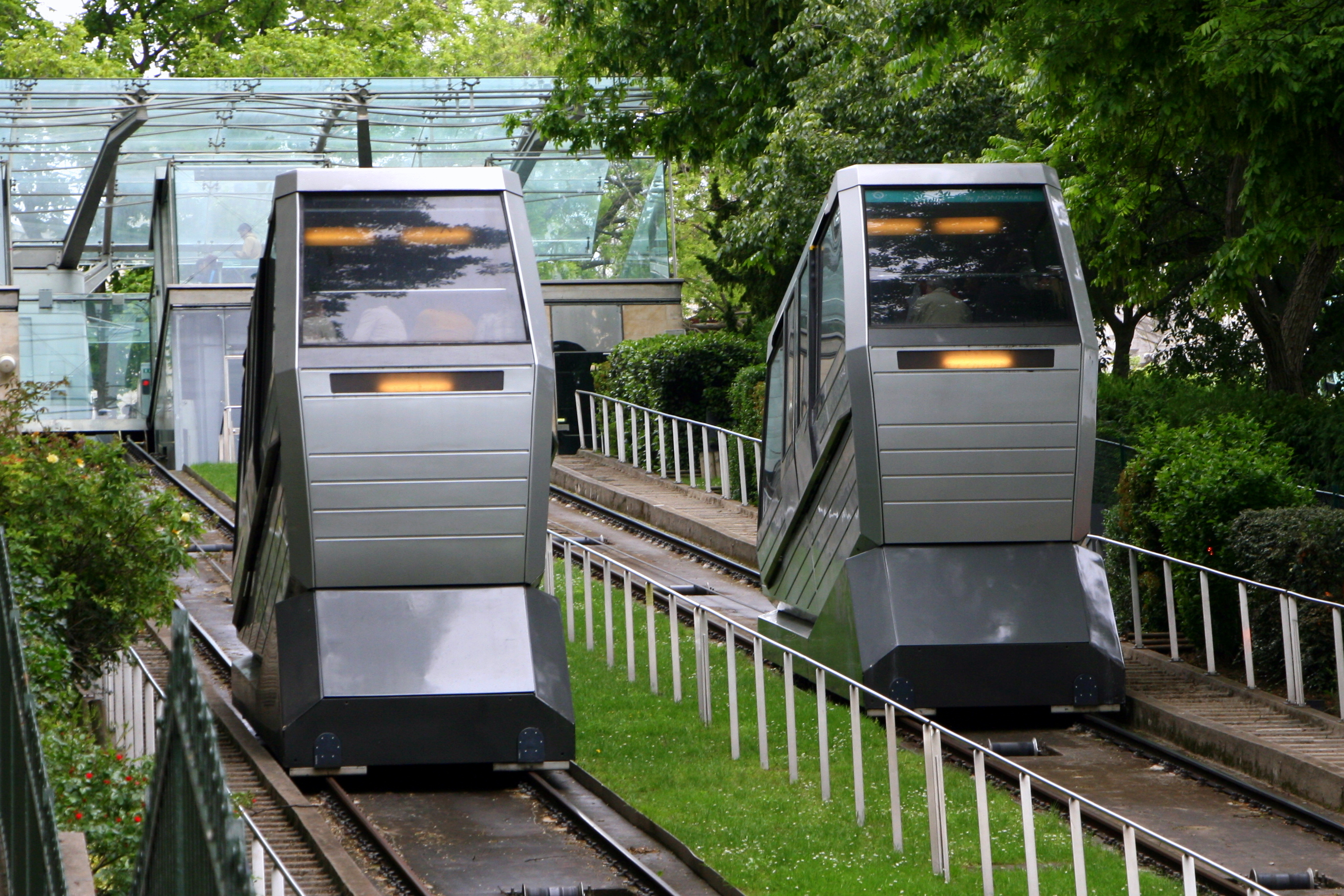

Overview
- Stations: 2

Service
- Operator: RATP
- Rolling stock: 2 cabins
- Ridership: 2 million journeys per year

History
- Opened: 13 July 1900

Technical
- Line length: 0.108 km (0.067 mi)
- Track gauge: 1,435 mm (4 ft 8 1/2 in)

The Montmartre Funicular (French: Funiculaire de Montmartre) is an inclined transport system serving the Montmartre neighbourhood of Paris, France, in the 18th arrondissement. Operated by the RATP, the Paris transport authority, the system opened in 1900; it was entirely rebuilt in 1935 and again in 1991.

The system is a funicular in name only. Its formal title, the Montmartre Funicular, is a vestige of its earlier configuration, where its cars operated in a counterbalanced, interconnected pair, always moving in opposite directions in concert, thus meeting the definition of a funicular. The system now uses two independently operating cars that can each ascend or descend on demand, qualifying as a double inclined elevator, retaining the term funicular in its title as a historical reference.

The system carries passengers between the base of Montmartre and its summit, accessing the nearby Sacré-Cœur basilica and paralleling the adjacent staircases of Rue Foyatier. The system is 108 m (354 ft) long and cars climb 36 m (118 ft) every 1.5 minutes. The system operates between 6:00 am and 12:45 am daily, transporting 6,000 people a day and 2 million people a year.

== History ==
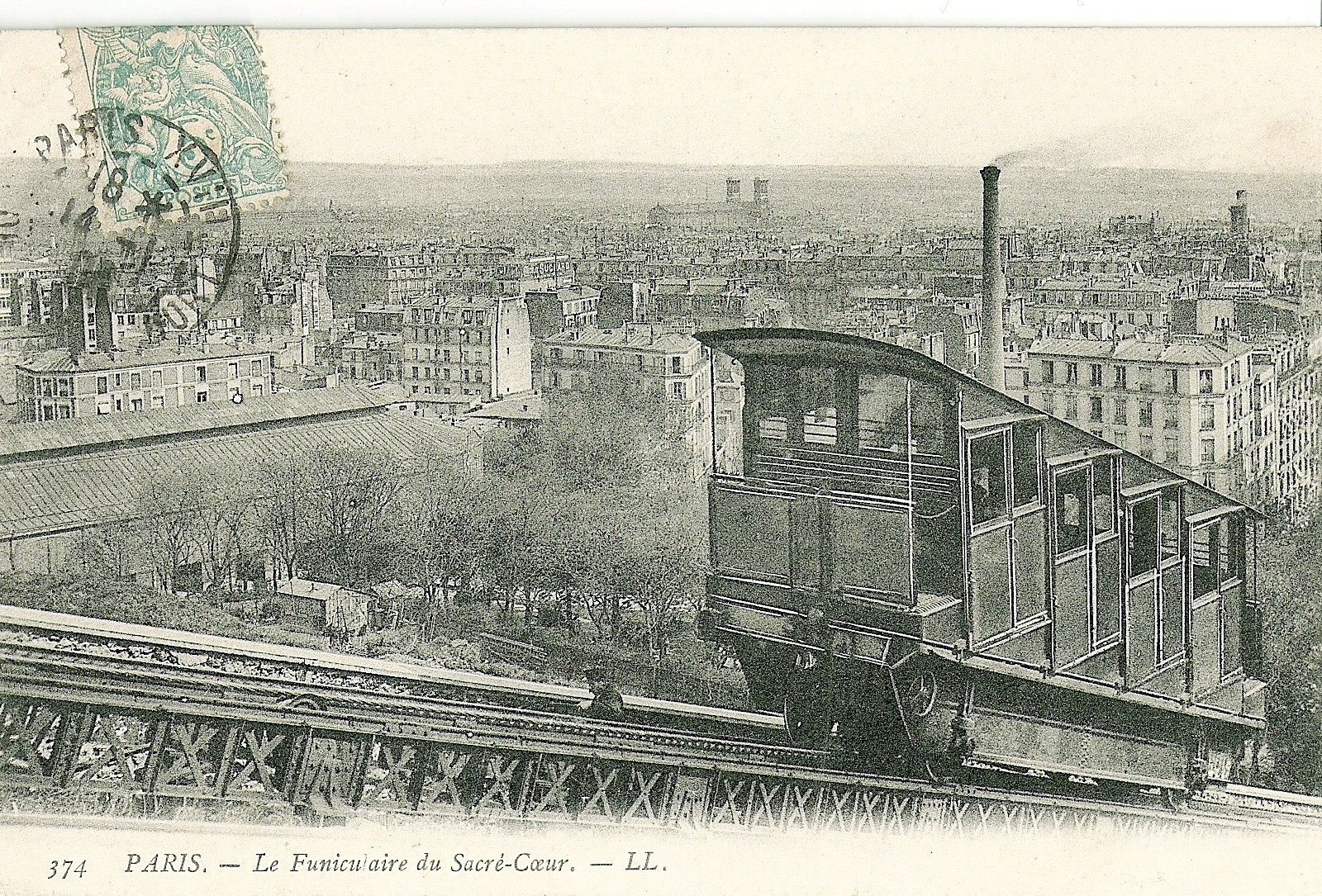
The first, water-driven Montmartre funicular

The Paris city government voted to construct the Montmartre transport system in 1891. Initially, operation was subcontracted to Decauville through a concession that ended in 1931. Thereafter, the Société des transports en commun de la région parisienne (STCRP) took control, and this was nationalized together with the Compagnie du chemin de fer métropolitain de Paris (CMP) to form the Régie autonome des transports parisiens (RATP), which continues to operate the funicular today.

The original system in contrast to the current system was, in fact, a funicular with twin counterbalanced and interconnected cars. In the case of the Montmartre design, a system of onboard water bladders of 5 m^{3} (180 ft^{3}) could be filled or emptied to move the cars and to compensate for passenger load. In 1935, the system was converted to electricity. The system was completely rebuilt by the RATP in 1990–1991, as dual independently operating inclined elevators.

=== Chronology ===
- 12 or 13 July 1900: Opening of the first water-driven funicular
- 1 November 1931: Closing of the first water-driven funicular
- 2 February 1935: Opening of the second electric funicular
- 1 October 1990: Closing of the second electric funicular
- 5 October 1991: Opening of the third inclined elevator, retaining the funicular name

=== First system (1900) ===
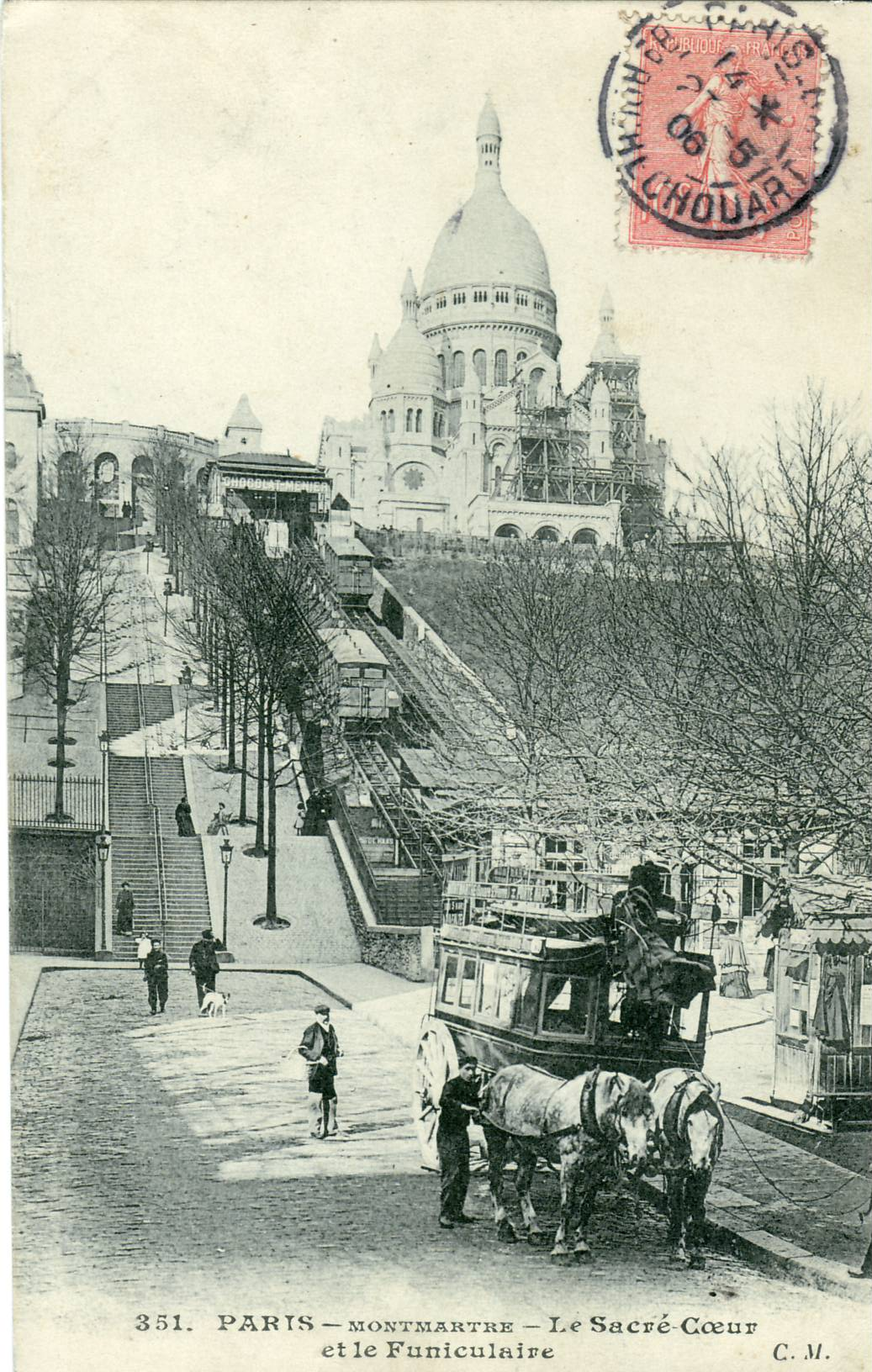
First Montmartre funicular

Construction of the Montmartre transport system was authorized by the Paris municipal council in 1891. It was built to serve the Sacré-Cœur Basilica at the summit of Montmartre. Original plans specified electrical traction and six stations between two termini. As built, the system used only two terminal stations and water-filled bladders as counterweights for motion.

The funicular entered service on 12 or 13 July (sources vary), and its operation was ceded to the Decauville company with a contract lasting until 1931. However, lacking the necessary authorisation from the Paris Prefecture of Police to run the service, the company had to close the funicular from 24 November 1900 until 22 May 1901.

The funicular was of double track at standard gauge, using the Strub rack system for braking. The rails were supported by sleepers made of structural steel, supported on concrete pedestals.

The system was powered by two sealed water tanks/bladders with a capacity of 5 m^{3} (180 ft^{3}) located under the floor of each cabin. The tanks of one cabin were refilled at the upper station, allowing its descent under gravity with the combined weight of the passengers and water, enabling the other carriage to ascend. A steam engine situated at the lower station worked the filling pumps at the upper station. The cabins held forty-eight passengers in four closed compartments arranged like a staircase; the two end platforms were reserved for the driver and brakeman. These were retained for a brake system established on the rack railway. This system transported a million passengers a year for some thirty years.

=== Second system (1935) ===
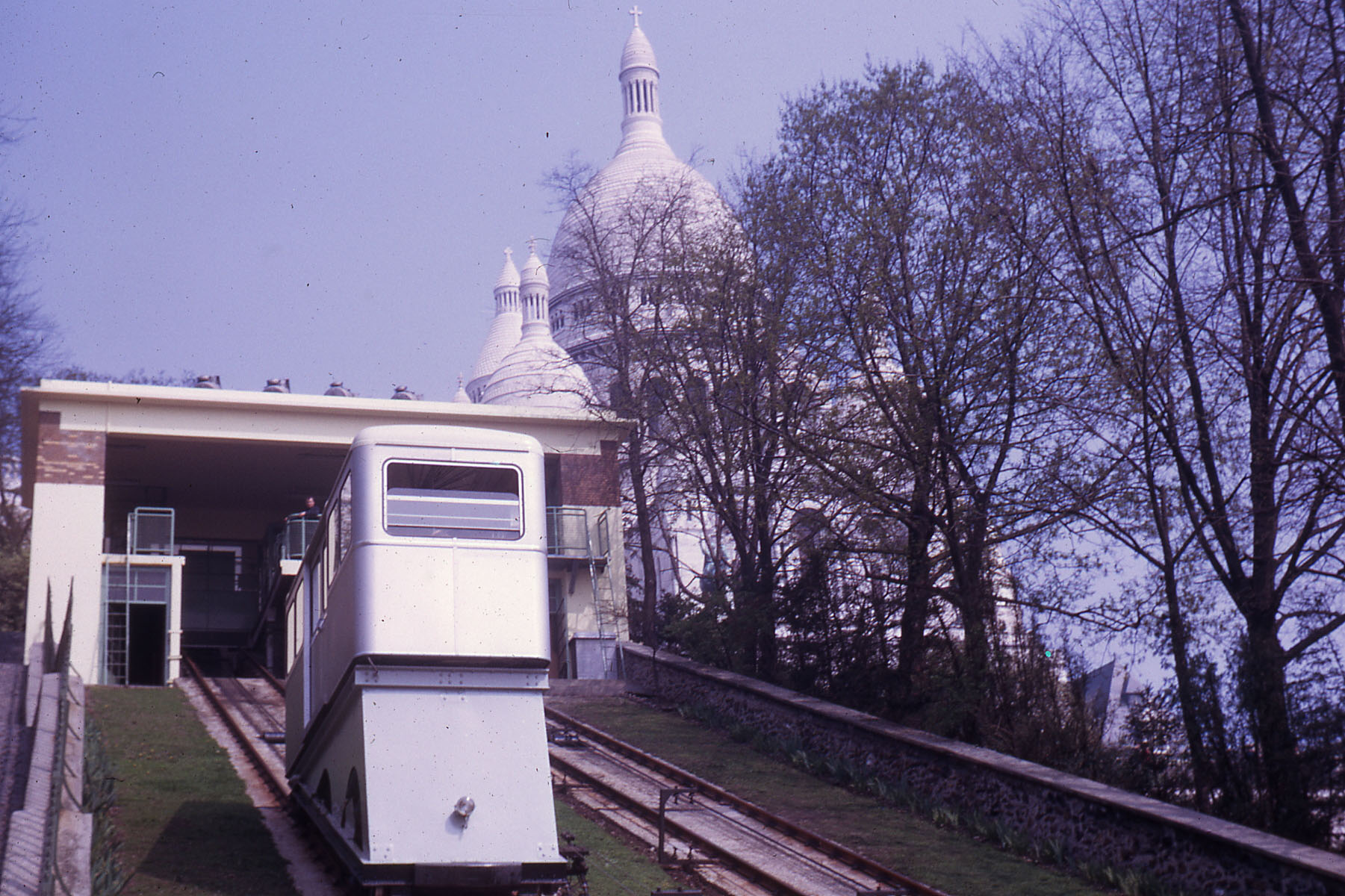
A cabin in 1963, after the first renovation

Profile

When the contract expired, the Mayor of Paris and the Seine Department charged the Société des transports en commun de la région parisienne (STCRP) with running the service and modernising the infrastructure. The rack system was deemed too dangerous and so the initial system was shut down; operations ceased on 1 November 1931. The water-driven system was replaced by two electrically driven cabins and reopened on 2 February 1935 after an interruption of more than three years. Traction was provided by a winch driven by a 50 hp (37 kW) electric motor, allowing a cabin holding fifty people to make the journey in 70 seconds at a speed of 2 m/s (4.5 mph). The cabins were no longer arranged like a staircase but composed of a single compartment with a horizontal floor.

By 1955, the line was in service from 7 am until 9 pm in winter and until 11 pm in summer, entry to the station being made by cancelling a bus ticket. In 1962, the funicular transported 1,600,000 passengers and operations were suspended for some weeks for a new renovation. The line was opened in the presence of "poulbots" (Parisian illustrators) and Émile Kérembrun, the President of the République de Montmartre, a philanthropic society.

=== Third system (1991) ===
After fifty-five years of operation, transporting two million passengers annually, the system was in need of renovation. An idea was proposed by the RATP and the Mairie de Paris, to lengthen the line with a tunnel to the Anvers métro station. The idea was abandoned due to high cost.

The RATP entirely rebuilt the funicular in 1990 and 1991. Operations ceased on 1 October 1990, being substituted with a minibus service, the "Montmartrobus", between the Place Pigalle and the top of the butte, until the new system entered service on 5 October 1991. The old stations were demolished and rebuilt as designed by architect François Deslaugiers. The works were undertaken by Schindler Group, a lift manufacturer, and cost 43.1 million francs.

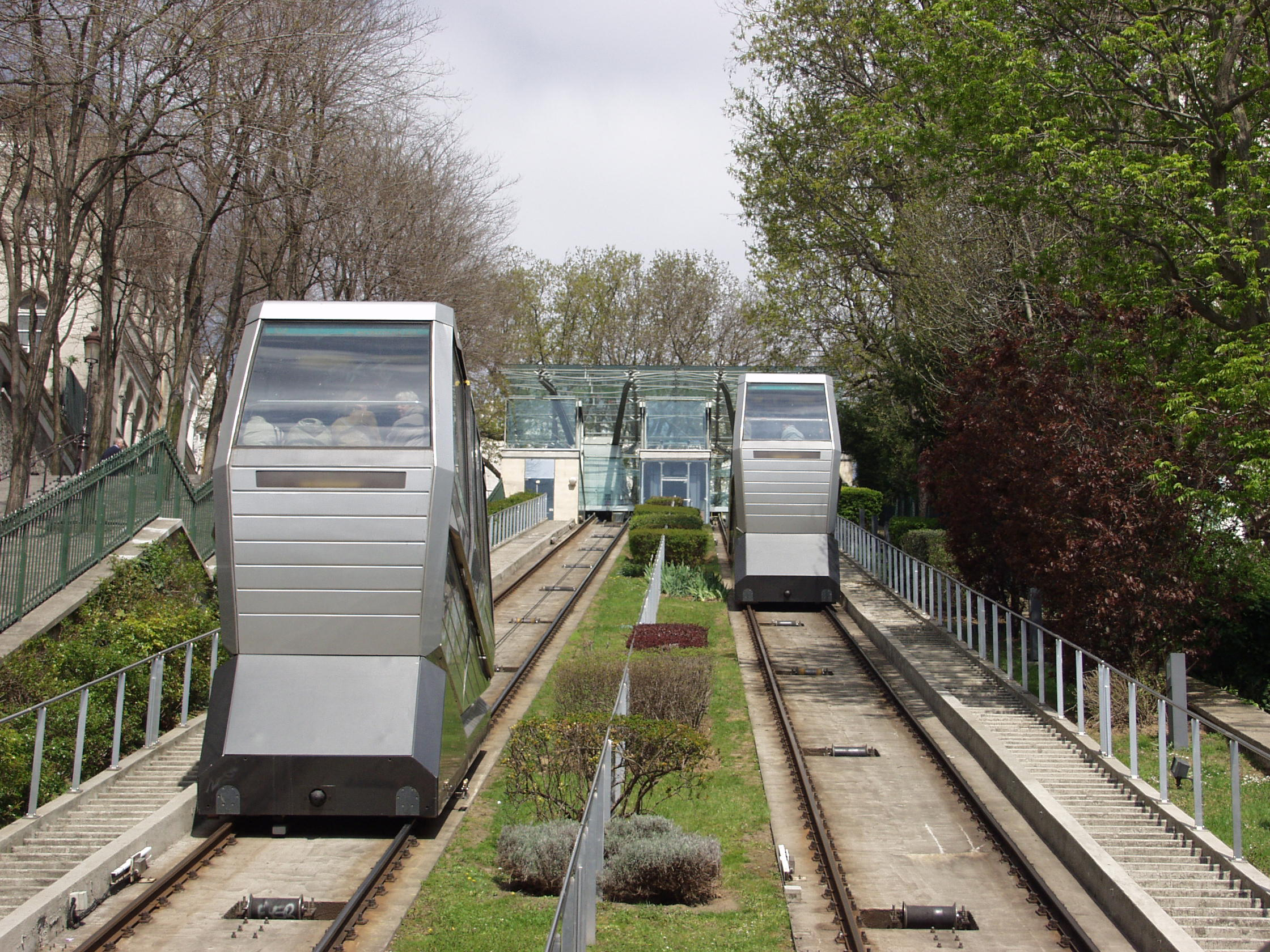
Track and cabins after the second renovation

Since its latest renovation, the system uses angled lift technology with electrical traction. It is no longer a funicular but retains the term in reflection of its history. The system no longer functions with the requisite interconnected and counterbalanced arrangement of a funicular (where cabins always move in opposite directions, the descending cabin counterweighing the ascending one). The machinery is located in the higher station; it is composed of two totally independent winches powered by 130 kW (170 hp) motors. The cabins each weigh 6 tonnes (5.9 long tons; 6.6 short tons) unladen, 10 tonnes (9.8 long tons; 11 short tons) when full. They have a service brake and an emergency brake. The carriages and chassis were made by Skirail, and the electrics by Poma.

Operation is entirely automatic: The presence and number of passengers are detected by a system combining electronic balance scales mounted in the cabin floor, and radar in the stations. A computer determines the cabin's departure, indicated with a display board in the cabin. According to the amount of passenger traffic, it chooses between the two possible operating speeds, 2 m/s (6.6 ft/s) and 3.5 m/s (11 ft/s). For safety, the platform edge doors open only when a cabin is present, as on the Paris Métro Line 14 and some stations on London's Jubilee line.

On 7 December 2006 at 5.50 pm, a cabin crashed down the slope during a brake system test by RATP. The terminal of the lifting cable broke. The service was suspended, adding to the problems of the residents and traders on the butte, the first having to make do with a less-frequent replacement bus service, the second seeing their trading levels fall (20–30% lower than for December 2006 [sic]) from having fewer tourists. One of the two cabins was put back in service on 30 June 2007, the other on 2 August 2008.

== System specifications ==
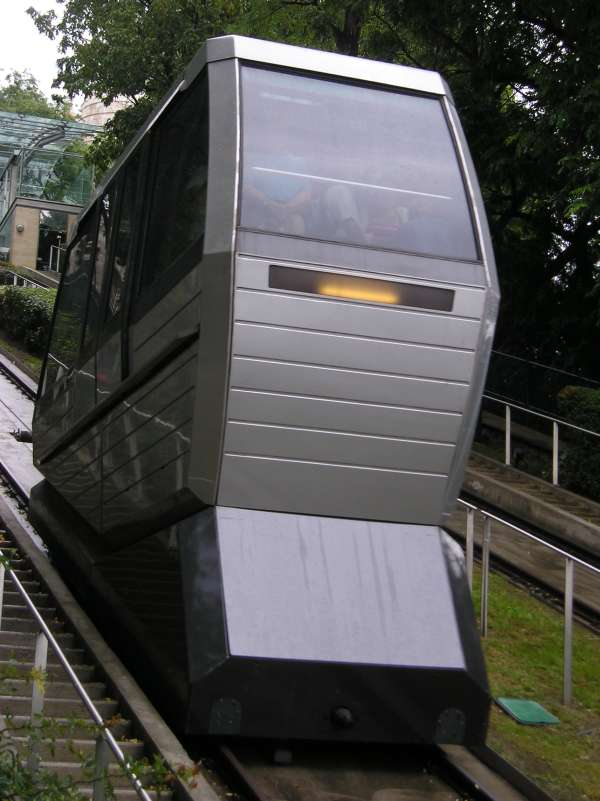
One of the cabins taken from the level of its wheels

The system has two cabins with sixty places each which travel on two separate, parallel tracks using the international standard gauge of 1,435 mm (4 ft 8 1/2 in). It has a capacity of 2,000 passengers per hour in each direction. A trip in either direction, which covers a vertical distance of 36 m (118 ft) over a track distance of 108 m (354 ft), takes less than 90 seconds and climbs or descends a gradient as high as 35.2% (a little steeper than 1:3).

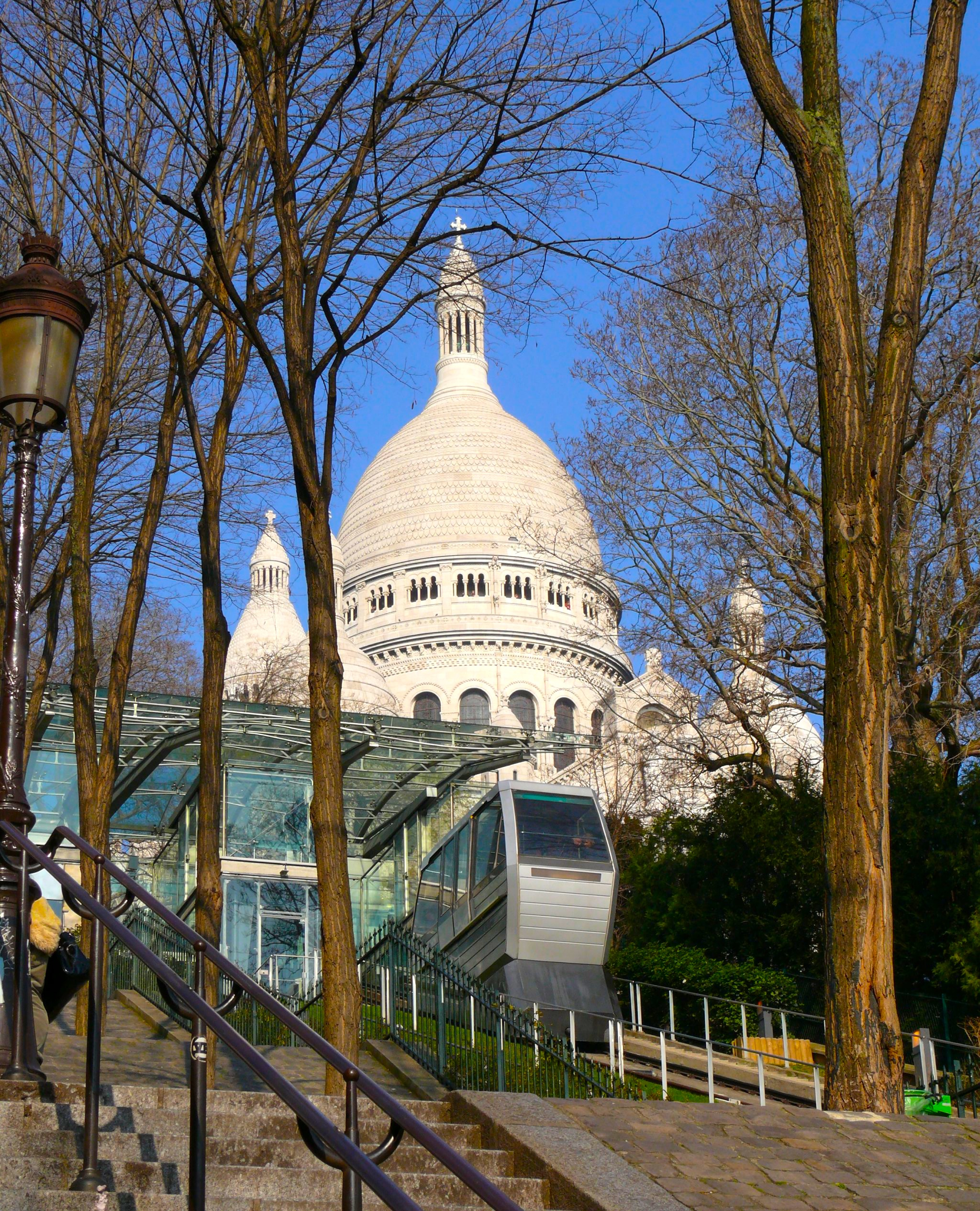
The upper station

The technology of the Montmartre line differs from a funicular in that it uses independently operating cars more related to standard up-down elevators, each equipped with its own counterweight. Again, a funicular's cars are by definition arranged in counterbalanced, interconnected pairs, moving in concert. The Montmartre system now allows each car to function independently, with its own hoist and cables. Advantages of this arrangement include the ability of one car to remain in service during maintenance of the other. Also, both cabins can ascend simultaneously (usually, more passengers use the system to ascend than to descend), where cars of a funicular always travel in opposite directions.

The see-through stations were designed by architect François Deslaugiers and the cabins were designed by Roger Tallon, who also designed the carriages of the TGV Atlantique. The cabin roofs are partly glazed, allowing a view during transit.

The Codes d'oblitération ("Allocation codes") of the lower and upper stations are respectively 31-02 and 31-03. Code 31 corresponds to the Quartier Pigalle, or FUNB and FUNH.

The lower station (Gare Basse) is located between the Place Saint-Pierre and the Place Suzanne-Valadon, and the upper station (Gare Haute) is located on the Rue du Cardinal-Dubois.

Two Métro stations are within easy walking distance of the lower station: Anvers on Line 2 about 200 m (220 yd) to the south and Abbesses on Line 12 about 350 m (380 yd) to the west. Bus line 40 has a stop on the Rue du Cardinal-Dubois in front of the upper station.

== Fares ==
A Métro-Train-RER Ticket costs €2.55 for adults and €1.30 for children ages 4-10. The fare is valid for Métro, Transilien, RER and Funicular journeys, up to 120 minutes, including all connections inside the network and some connections outside the network. The fare is not valid for journeys to and from the airports. The fare can be validated with a Navigo Easy Travel Card, or a Navigo on Smartphone.

== Finance ==
The RATP finances the line's operation (maintenance, infrastructure and cost of personnel). Fares are set by political decisions which do not cover the true cost of transportation. The loss is made good by the controlling authority, the Syndicat des transports d'Île-de-France (STIF), which since 2005 has been under the control of the Conseil régional d'Île-de-France ("Île-de-France Regional Council") and composed of local representatives. It defines the general conditions of operation and the duration and frequency of services. Losses are made good by an annual block grant to regional transport operators funded by the versement transport ("Transport payment"), a tax raised on companies with more than nine employees. Public bodies also contribute.

== Popular culture ==
The funicular is an essential element in Parisian life, and thus appears in many films and television series having Montmartre as a theme. One of the most famous is Ripoux contre ripoux (1990), starring Thierry Lhermitte and Philippe Noiret, and it also appears in Les Randonneurs (1997), El Tourbini (2006) and Louise (Take 2) (1998).

In the first pilot episode of the police series Capitaine Casta, a chase takes place on the Rue Foyatier steps alongside the funicular, just like in the classic film Céline et Julie vont en bateau (1974, Jacques Rivette); in the pilot, the character played by Jean-Pierre Castaldi runs up it to catch the crooks. Similarly in the film Une affaire d'État (2009), Michel Fernandez (Thierry Frémont) flees by the stairs, chased by Nora Chahyd (Rachida Brakni) who takes the funicular.

Jean-Pierre Melville opened his film Bob le flambeur (1956) with a tracking shot around the Montmartre quarter where the film is set, and voiceover then says "c'est tout à la fois le ciel [shot over the Basilique du Sacré-Coeur] et... [bird's eye view of the funicular descending, with music poco a poco fortissimo] ... l'enfer [Shot of the Place Pigalle]" ("It is at one and the same time heaven ... and ... hell").

The funicular figures in an eponymous work by Jean Marchand (1883–1940), on view at the Musée d'Art Moderne de la Ville de Paris. It appears in literature in a short story by Boileau-Narcejac titled L’énigme du funiculaire ("The enigma of the funicular"), published in 1971 in the review Manigances, and also in the works of Jacques Charpentreau who, in a poem entitled Le funiculaire de Montmartre, compares the cabins to two contrary brothers: Quand l'un s'envole dans les airs/ L'autre se précipite en bas/ Et lan lan la ("When one flies into the air, the other falls to the ground/ And la, la la").

In October 2006, at the request of the website la Blogothèque for its "concerts à emporter" ("concerts to download"), the singer Cali made an appearance in one of the funicular's cabins surrounded by passengers, singing his song La Fin du monde pour dans 10 minutes ("The end of the world in ten minutes") from the album Menteur as it ascended. The funicular also appears in the 2011 3D computer generated animated film, A Monster in Paris.

== Future ==
Given the interest in the technical solution provided by the funicular for public passenger transport over relatively short and extremely steep routes, studies have called for the RATP to build similar systems, notably at Issy-les-Moulineaux, in the renovation project of the Fort d'Issy quarter, and to link the Meudon-sur-Seine station on Paris Tramway Line 2 with the Bellevue station, which would recreate the old Bellevue funicular at Meudon, demolished in 1934.

== See also ==
- Funicular
- Inclined railway
- List of funicular railways
- List of Paris metro stations
- Montmartre
- RATP

== Sources ==
- Various (1996). Le patrimoine de la RATP [Heritage of the RATP]. Le patrimoine des institutions économiques ("Heritage of economic institutions") (in French). Charenton-le-Pont: Flohic. ISBN 978-2-84234-007-0.
- Gennesseaux, Jean (1992). Funiculaires et crémaillères de France [French funiculars and rack railways] (in French). Paris: La Vie du Rail. ISBN 978-2-902808-42-7.
- Robert, Jean (1992). Les tramways parisiens [Paris tramways] (3rd ed.). ASIN B00175PCGO.
