= Julien Thoulet =

French oceanographer and geologist (1843–1936)

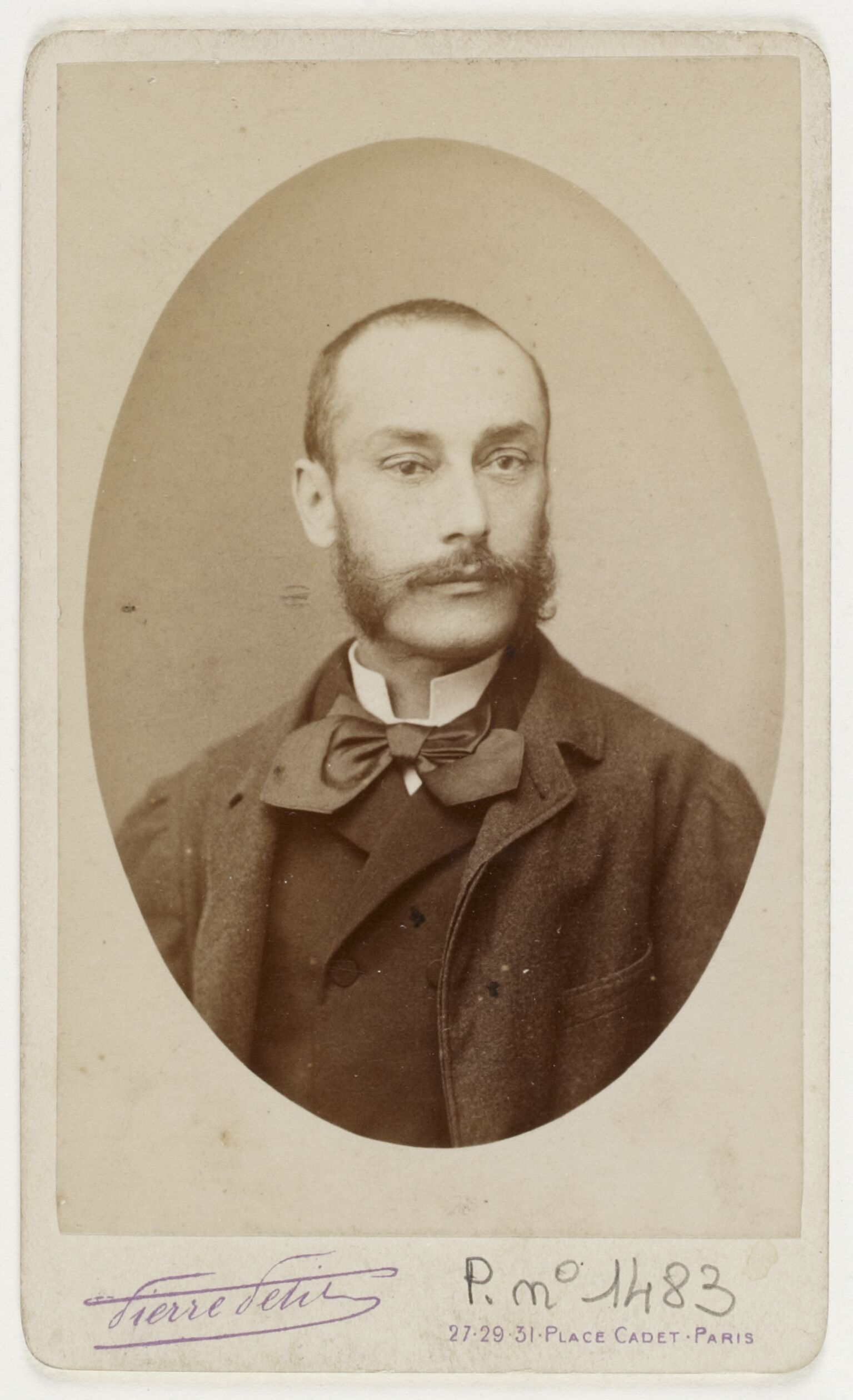
Carte-de-visite, 1884

Julien Marie Olivier Thoulet (6 February 1843 – 2 January 1936) was a French oceanographer, geologist, and naturalist. He was a professor of geology and mineralogy at the Faculty of Sciences in Nancy. With the sponsorship of Prince Albert I of Monaco, he was involved in creating the cartographic standards and producing the first edition of the General Bathymetric Chart of the Oceans. He has been considered one of the founders of oceanography in France.

== Life and work ==
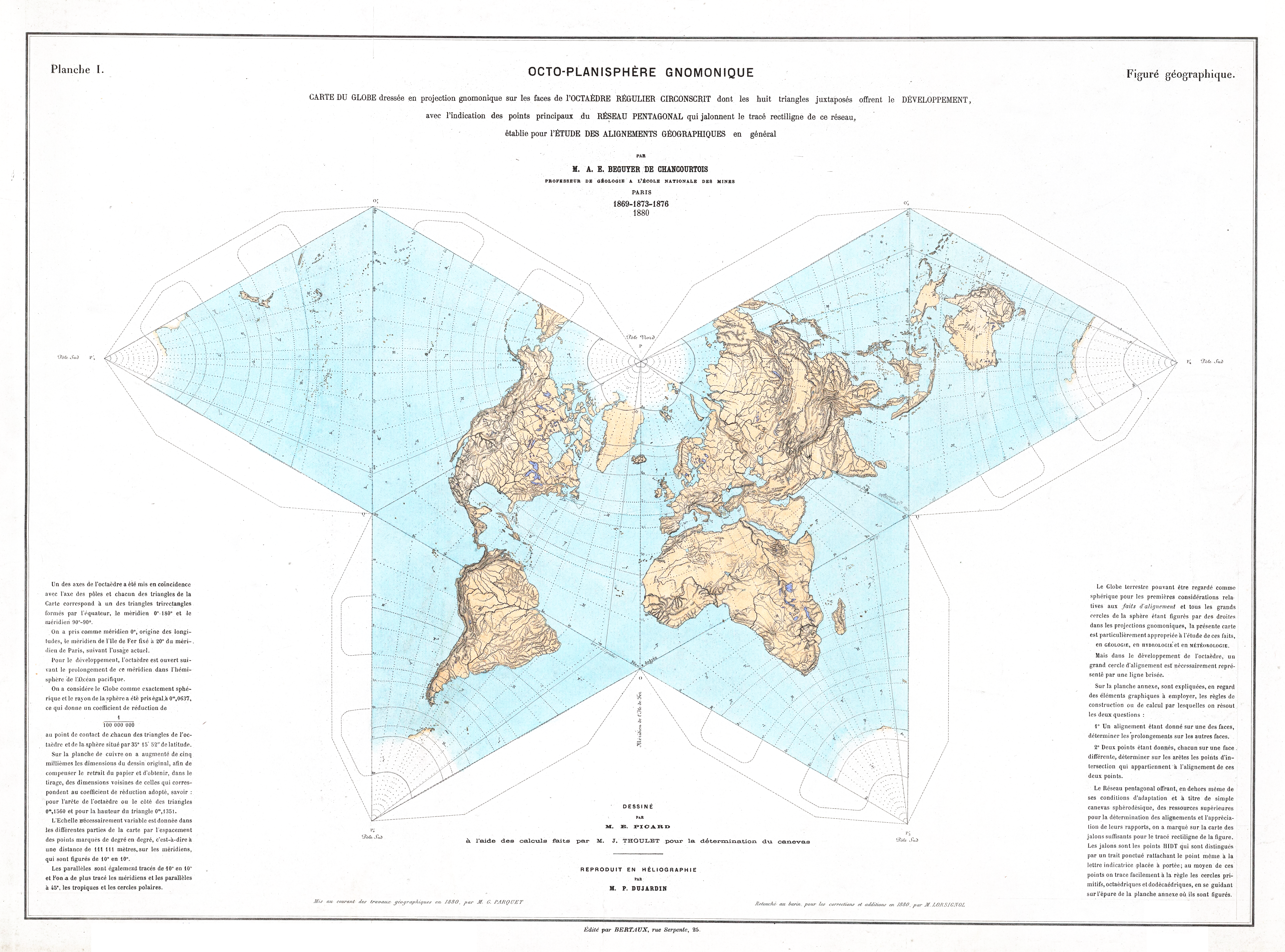
An octagonal gnomonic projection map created using calculations made by Thoulet (1880)

Thoulet was born in Algiers, the son of merchant Gilles and Marie Pauline Nisard. He studied at the Lycée d'Algiers and received a degree from Collège Sainte-Barbe, Paris and tried to enter the École Polytechnique but failed. He became a surveyor-topographer in 1864 and worked for Élie de Beaumont from 1866 to help in the production of a geological map of the world which was published by the Société de Géographie de Paris in 1868. He then worked on topographic work for the Northern Pacific Railroad line and returned to France in 1871, writing about his adventures in the region and his impressions on the Ojibwe Indians. He attended courses by Élie de Beaumont and obtained a bachelor's degree in science and went to work in the lab of Charles Sainte Claire Deville (1814–1876) and began to study mineralogy. He tried to get a position in Algiers after obtaining a doctorate in 1889. He was supported in his application by Ferdinand Fouqué. In 1882 he joined the Faculty of Montpellier and in 1884 he moved to Nancy where he succeeded Joseph Delbos to the chair of geology and mineralogy. He became interested in the rocks on the ocean bottom and began to study them. In 1886, he travelled to New Foundland aboard the La Clorinde to collect samples. From his work there, he produced ten papers which included bathymetric charts. Afterwards, he expressed that there was an urgent need for a general chart of the world's oceans. He then introduced the idea of oceanography as a subject in France. In 1901 he received the first oceanography prize instituted by the Société de Géographie de Paris.

=== Monaco bathymetry charts: first edition of GEBCO ===
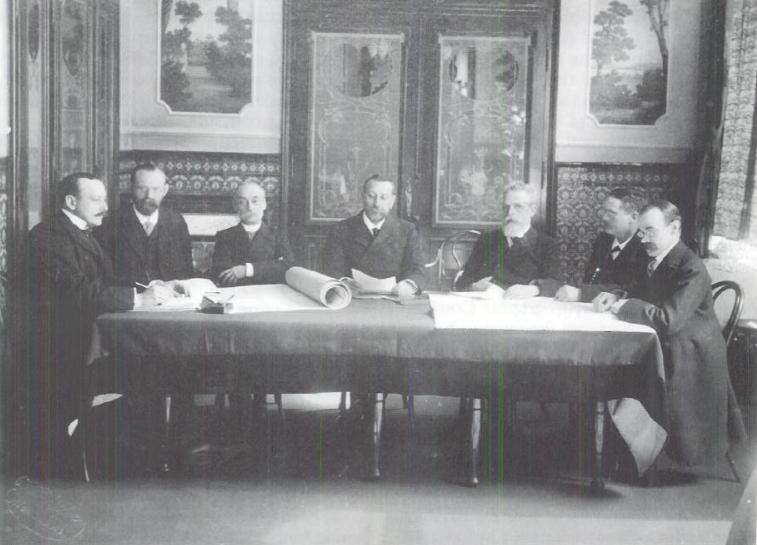
1903 meeting at Wiesbaden, Prince Albert I at centre and Thoulet seated rightmost

During the 1899 International Geographical Congress in Berlin, a proposal was made for standardization of the terminology and nomenclature of sub-ocean features. This led to a committee being created to produce a chart of the oceans and members included Prince Albert I of Monaco, Otto Krümmel, H. R. Mill, Baron von Richthofen, Admiral Stepan Osipovich Makarov, Sir John Murray, Fridtjof Nansen, Otto Pettersson, Alexander Georg Supan, and Thoulet. The group met in 1903 and Prince Albert offered to finance the production of the maps. Thoulet came up with the cartographic specifications that included the indications of 15 kinds of submarine relief features. Seven draughtsmen led by Charles Sauerwein were recruited in Paris for the work. There were 16 sheets on Mercator and 8 polar gnomonic sheets. These were based on a compilation of 18,000 soundings and made on a scale of 1:10,000,000. Thoulet himself made several surveys aboard Prince Albert's yacht, the Princesse Alice-II. The first edition was called the "Monaco Chart". but more formally as the General Bathymetric Chart of the Oceans which was completed in 1904 and although it was criticized for being inadequate, including by Thoulet who stated that it "will increasingly tend towards perfection as successive editions come along, but which, in reality, will never be completed," it set the model for the production of subsequent maps in the General Bathymetric Chart of the Oceans.

=== Sediment analysis techniques ===
In 1906 he was involved in examining samples from the bottom of the Indian Ocean around Madagascar collected by the D'Entrecasteaux. Thoulet introduced sediment sampling techniques and innovated equipment and techniques. The Prince of Monaco Corer developed by Thoulet in 1890 was a sediment sampler that extracted a shallow depth core. Thoulet introduced a method of using a high density fluid made from potassium triiodomercurate to separate sediment fractions. This solution, sometimes terms as Thoulet's solution, is also used for its optical properties.

=== Later life ===
Thoulet retired in 1913 and was hoping to settle in Algiers but abandoned the plan to live in Nancy. During World War I he was called to service and appointed as a master mariner aboard a trawler. He received a Croix de Guerre. From 1920 he continued to conduct oceanographic studies, travelling aboard the Pour-quoi-Pas?. He worked in Paris at the Institut Oceanographique. In 1928 he went on the search for Guilbaud and Amundsen who had been a friend.

Thoulet married Gabrielle, daughter of sculptor Denis Foyatier in 1879 in Clamart. They had five children. Thoulet was a Grand Officer of the Legion of Honour, a member of the Academy of Science, Académie de Stanislas, and several other organizations.

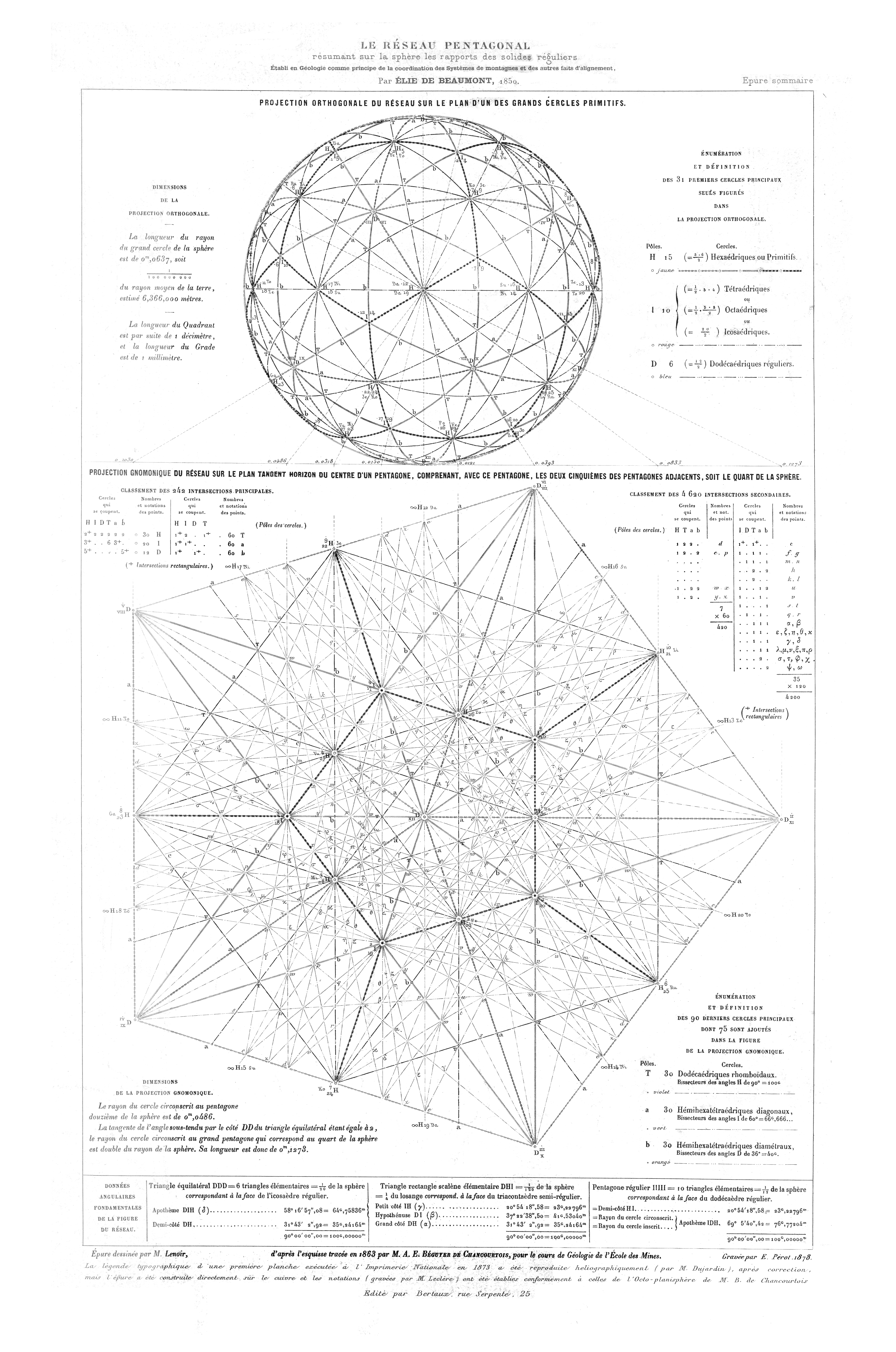
Octo-planisphere projection calculations

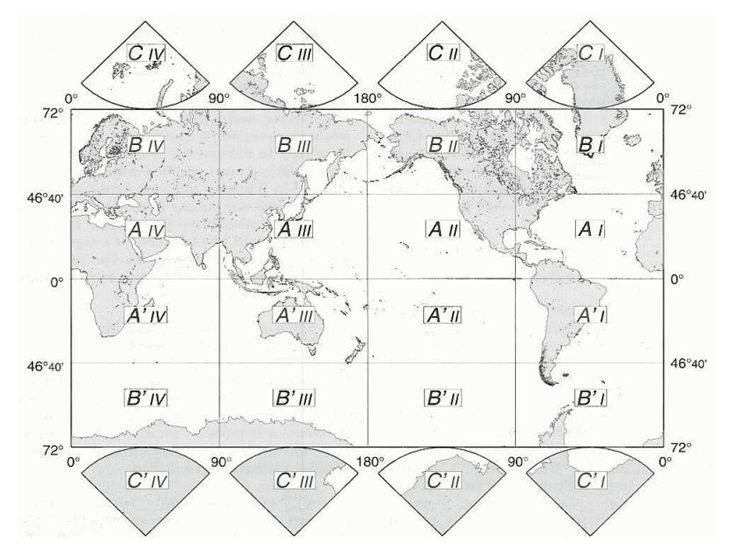
Index for the 24 bathymetric maps (1903-1905)

Bathymetric map of the northern Atlantic

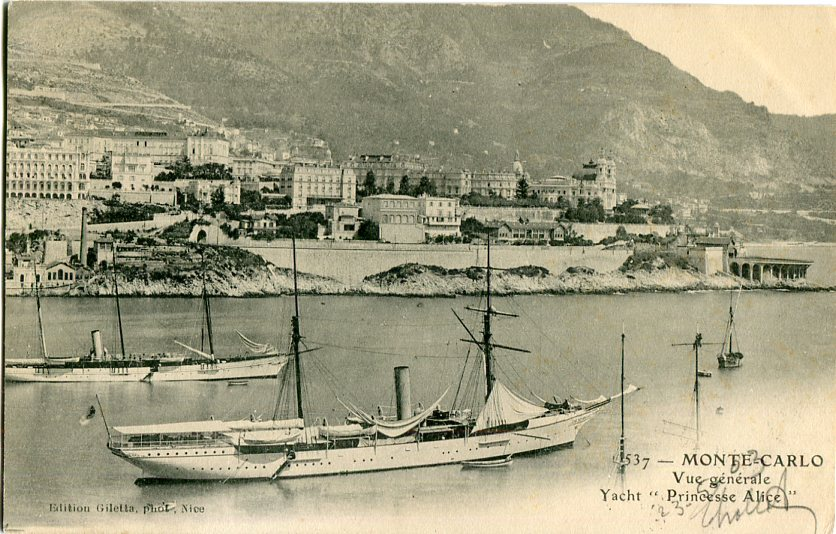
Princesse Alice II in 1903
