= Versement transport =

In France, the versement transport (abbreviated VT) is a hypothecated urban regional payroll tax levied on the total gross salaries of all employees of companies of more than 11 employees, originally intended to raise capital for investment in local public transport infrastructure, but more and more used to cover its operating expenses. The tax is levied on the employer, not the employee directly. The money is directed to the autorité organisatrice de transport urbain (AOT, "Urban Regional Transport Authority"), the local government authority responsible for organising public transport.

In 2010, for example, this tax financed nearly 40% of the operational cost for the public transport network in Ile-de-France through the Syndicat des transports d'Île-de-France (STIF), the AOT for the Île-de-France, which includes Paris. The STIF distributed the money between the RATP (the metropolitan transport authority), the SNCF (the state railway operator) and the Optile group (private companies that operate bus lines in the suburbs).

== Expansion ==
First established in the Paris region, in 1973 the VT was extended to all urban regions of over 300,000 people. In 1974 this was extended to those whose population exceeded 100,000, in 1982, to those over 30,000 (by the "Administration Territoriale de la République" law) and in 1999 to those over 10,000 (the "Loi relative au renforcement et à la simplification de la coopération intercommunale", more commonly known as the Chevènement law). The money is directed to the local autorité organisatrice de transport urbain. Between 1975 and 1982, the minimum population being fixed at 100,000 may have played a decisive part in the creation of AOTs encompassing several smaller communes, and in the extension of "périmètres de transport urbain" (PTUs, "Urban Transport limits", i.e. essentially the edges of fare zones).

== Rates ==
=== General ===
The VT rate is variable depending on the size of the population in the PTU. Since 2011, it is limited to 0.9% for PTUs with fewer than 100,000 inhabitants.

=== Île de France ===
- 2.85% in Paris and the Département of Hauts-de-Seine
- 1.91% in certain municipalities, set by decree, in the Départements of Seine-Saint-Denis, Val-de-Marne, Seine-et-Marne, Yvelines, Essonne, and Val-d'Oise
- 1.50% for other municipalities in Île-de-France.

=== Supplements ===
- an AOT can set its tax at 1.75% if it provides the service itself rather than contracting it out
- An extra 0.05% may be raised if the AOT is a "communauté de communes", a "communauté d'agglomération" or a "communauté urbaine"
- Since July 2010, another 0.2% may be raised if at least one commune in the PTU Is classed as a tourist destination.

=== Deductions ===
Employers who grow to exceed the threshold of 11 employees are exempt from paying transport tax for three years and receive a discount of 75% the fourth year, 50% the fifth year and 25% in year six.

== Usage ==
In the 1970s, this tax was used to modernise the public transport networks.
