= Autorité organisatrice de transports =

In France, an autorité organisatrice de transports (transport organisation authority), usually abbreviated AOT, is one of the local government bodies implementing the 1982 law for the organisation of transportation in France.

At the local level a commune, or more commonly a group of them, is an autorité organisatrice de transport urbain (urban transport organisation authority). Such an organisation may either run public transport services itself (a régie en droit public français) or contract them out other bodies such as private companies (a délégation de service public). Authorities try to balance the books, notably by levying a tax called the versement transport (VT) which is deducted from wages of those working in the area covered by their services, known as the périmètre de transport urbain (PTU).

Regions of France are autorités organisatrices des transports non urbains (non-urban transport organisation authorities) for their area.. Before 2017 and NOTRe (Nouvelle Organisation Territoriale de la République - literally "New Territorial Organization of Republic)) law, departements of France were authorities. Île-de-France Mobilités, formerly the Syndicat des transports d'Île-de-France (STIF), is the transport organisation authority in the Île-de-France.

In urban areas the AOT governing the regional rail services provided by the Transport express régional, that of the General Coach Council (French: conseil général pour les autocars) and one or more other inter-commune public bodies, all may coexist trying to govern the same geographical area. This can create difficulties in co-ordinating timetables, service frequencies and fares. Sometimes this is sorted out by creating a joint syndicate body to which the several AOTs delegate their authority.

== Autorité organisatrice de transport urbain ==
An autorité organisatrice de transport urbain (AOTU; urban transport organisation authority) is a type of autorité organisatrice de transports (AOT) for urban areas.

An AOTU provides the co-ordination of the urban public transport network within its area, known as the périmètre de transport urbain (PTU; urban transport perimeter). To do so it receives funds raised via a transport tax on local businesses called the versement transport (VT).

There are several types of legal structure which these organisations by which AOTUs may be governed Traditionally, urban public transport was organised by the French communes, especially in the south of France. In 1999, commune-based organisations represented over 30% of all AOTUs. Since the 1970s, however, AOTs have tended to combine across communes, with the creation of numerous syndicats intercommunaux à vocation unique (SIVUs; inter-commune single-purpose syndicates) with a remit only for the direction of urban transport. Between the end of the 1970s and 1999, 20% to 30% of AOTUs were SIVUs.

In 2004, some years after the adoption of the 1999 loi relative au renforcement et à la simplification de la coopération intercommunale (law for the improvement and simplification of inter-communal cooperation), usually known as the loi Chevènement, the most common structure for AOTUs were as communautés d’agglomération (agglomeration communities), at 43% of the total, with communautés de communes (communities of communes) making up 12% and communautés urbaines (urban communities) making up 5% of all AOTUs. Additionally, mixed syndicates represented 12% of the total in 2004, when SIVUs (8%) and syndicats intercommunaux à vocation multiples (SIVOMs; inter-commune multi-purpose syndicates) (1%) were being phased out. By 2004, 18% of all AOTUs were communes.

An AOTU can run the transport service itself (a régie en droit public français) or contract it out to another transport operator. Contractual relations between the AOTU and the contractor can also take many different forms: for example as a délégation de service public or a droit des marchés publics en France. According to the Groupement des autorités responsables de transport (GART; Transport Authorities Group), in 2004 91% of public transport networks were implemented under contract and only 9% operated in-house.

== See also ==
- Autorité organisatrice de transport urbain, a type of AOT for urban areas
