= Rue André Barsacq =

Street in Paris, France

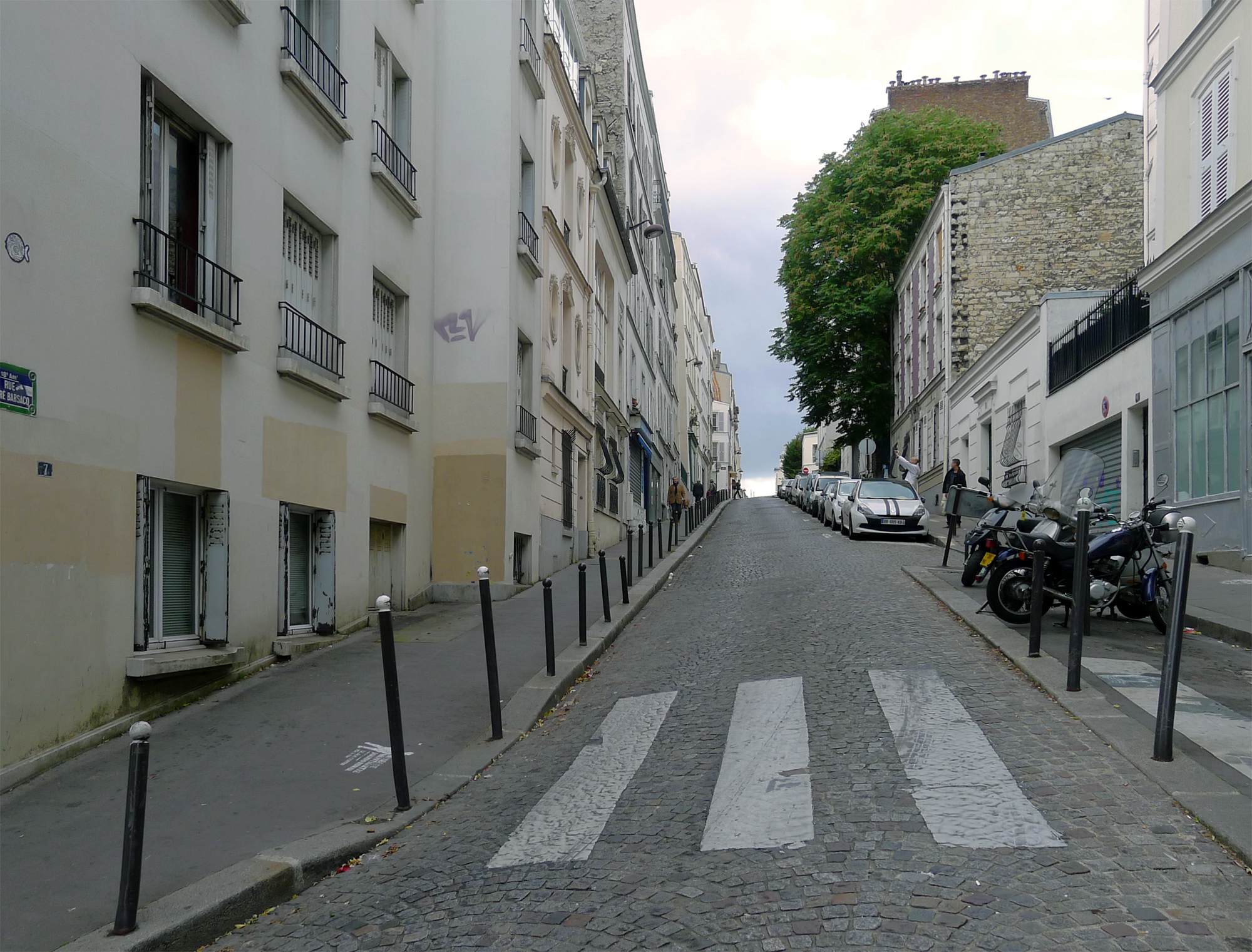

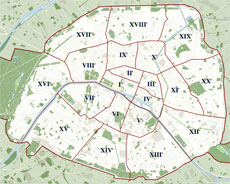
- Length: 140
- Width: 10
- Addresses: 3-6
- Arrondissement: 18
- Quarter: Montmartre
- From: Rue Foyatier
- To: Rue Drevet

The Rue André Barsacq is a road located in Montmartre. Formerly known as the Rue Berthe, its name refers to the playwright André Barsacq.

== Access ==
Metro stations include Abbesses and Anvers.

== Features ==
- Galerie Chappe (at no. 4)
- Galerie Paul Frèches (at no. 12)
