= Quartier de Clignancourt =

Coordinates: 48.8868058°N 2.3430153°E

Clignancourt
- Quartier de Clignancourt
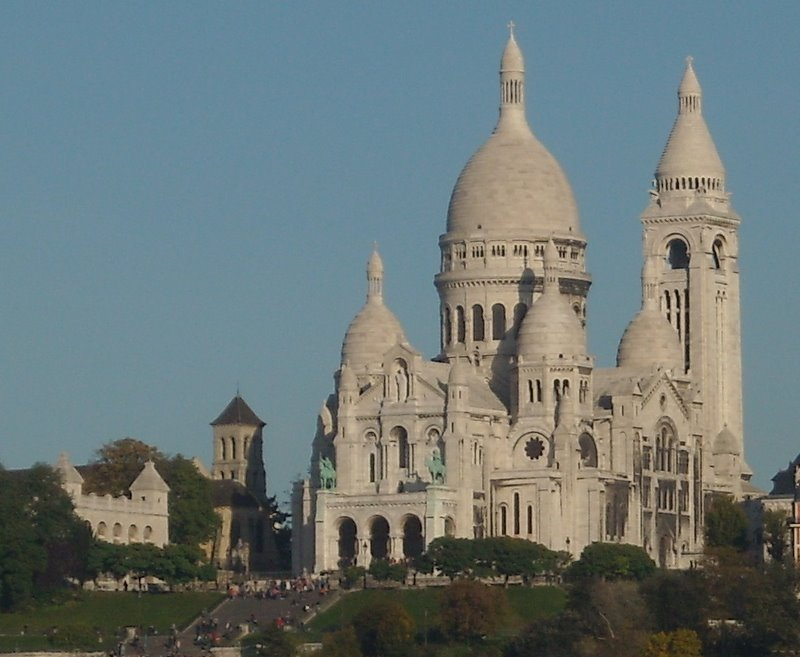
- Sacré-Cœur, Paris
- Interactive map of Clignancourt
- Country: France
- Region: Île-de-France
- Ville: Paris
- Arrondissement: 18th

Area
  - Total: 1.653 km^{2} (0.638 sq mi)

Population (2016)
  - Total: 68,873
  - Density: 41,665/km^{2} (107,910/sq mi)

The Quartier de Clignancourt is the 70th administrative quarter in the 18th arrondissement of Paris, located on the eastern side of Montmartre hill.

== History ==
According to the accounts of Abbé Lebeuf, the name derives from Clenini Curtis—or "land of Clignancourt"—referring to an owner named Cleninus, to whom the Roman villa discovered in 1738 once belonged.

Known since the 13th century, this district is situated on the northern side of Montmartre and extends as far as Saint-Ouen-sur-Seine. The village was once renowned for its vineyards ("Vin de Clignancour"), grain cultivation, and cherry trees.

In the 14th century, the fief (estate) belonged to the powerful Abbey of Saint-Denis; it later passed into the hands of several Parisian families who held the title of Seigneur de Clignancourt (Lord of Clignancourt).

In 1569, the lordship came into the possession of Jacques Ligier, a financial administrator for Cardinal de Bourbon, who commissioned the construction of the Sainte-Trinité chapel. The Ligier family remained the owners from 1666 until the estate eventually passed to the Dame de Montmartre (the Lady of Montmartre); it subsequently lost its independence during the French Revolution.

The hamlet of Clignancourt and the commune of Montmartre were incorporated into the Quartier de Clignancourt in 1860, upon the creation of the 18th arrondissement.

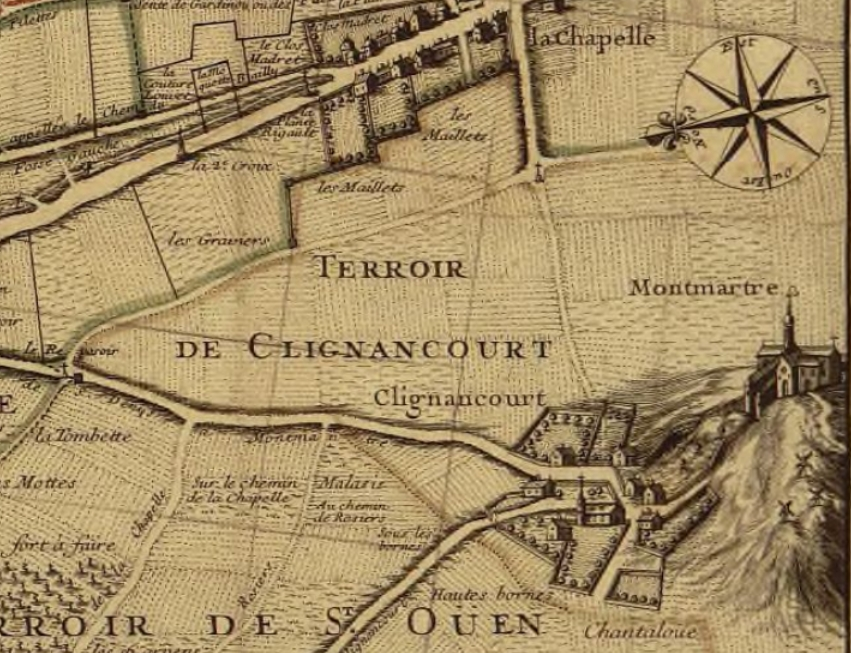
Clignancourt in the year 1707

Location of the quartier within the 18th arrondissement

== Sightseeing features ==
- Place du Tertre
- Sacré-Cœur, Paris
- Square Louise-Michel, the park on the hill in front of the basilica
- Élysée Montmartre
- Notre-Dame de Clignancourt
