= Loi relative au renforcement et à la simplification de la coopération intercommunale =

The loi n° 99-586 du 12 juillet 1999 relative au renforcement et à la simplification de la coopération intercommunale ("Law 99-586 of 12 July 1999 relating to the improvement and simplification of inter-communal cooperation"), commonly called the loi Chevènement ("Chevènement law") after its proposer Jean-Pierre Chevènement, then Interior Minister in the Jospin government, is one of the principal laws encouraging inter-municipal cooperation in France.

It defined the roles of three new types of établissements publics de coopération intercommunale (EPCI, "Public establishments for inter-communal cooperation") with their own financing:

- Community of communes (French: communautés de communes)
- Agglomeration community (French: communautés d'agglomération)
- Urban community (French: communautés urbaines), for which the minimum population is 500,000.

Some previous structures such as communautés de ville, districts and syndicats d'agglomération nouvelle ("New town syndicates") were expected to merge into one of these three types of EPCI.
