= De Dietrich SAS =

French company

- Type: Société par actions simplifiée
- Industry: Chemical and pharmaceutical industry equipment
- Founded: 1684
- Founder: Jean de Dietrich
- Headquarters: Schiltigheim, France
- Key people: Jacques Moulin (CEO)
- Owner: De Dietrich Family (via Financière Jaegerthal)
- Website: www.dedietrich.com

De Dietrich SAS (doing business as De Dietrich Process Systems (DDPS)) is a French industrial group specialized in equipment for the pharmaceutical and chemical industries. Its origins date back to the 17th century. Historically, the company was also active in the railway sector (sold to Alstom) and the home appliance market (sold).

== Operations ==
De Dietrich Process Systems is a provider of engineered solutions, equipment, and services for the fine chemical, pharmaceutical, and allied industries. The company's activities are organized around several core technologies, including glass-lined steel reactors, stainless steel and special alloy vessels, and equipment made from borosilicate glass and silicon carbide.

As of 2024, the company operates with a workforce of approximately 1,400 employees worldwide. Its industrial and commercial presence spans across all continents, maintaining 25 locations, including manufacturing plants, sales offices, and technical service centers in Europe, Asia, and the Americas.

== History ==
=== Origins ===
In 1684, Johann von Dietrich (Jean de Dietrich) acquired the forge of Jaegerthal. In 1719, the De Dietrich family was granted the title of Baron of the Holy Roman Empire. Jean Dietrich, grandson of the former, was ennobled by Louis XV in 1761. He became the largest landowner in Alsace and built an industrial empire through the acquisition of forges and blast furnaces.

In 1778, Louis XVI granted Jean de Dietrich a trademark in the shape of a hunting horn to protect his production from counterfeiting. This symbol remains the group's logo today. In 1792, Philippe-Frédéric de Dietrich, Jean's son and the first constitutional mayor of Strasbourg, commissioned the patriotic song composed by Captain Claude Joseph Rouget de Lisle, known today as La Marseillaise.

From 1843, the Reichshoffen machine shops produced Schattenmann model road rollers. Following the Annexation of Alsace-Lorraine by Germany in 1870, the family chose to remain in Alsace, diversifying into consumer goods such as stoves, bathtubs, and urban equipment.

In 1902, the company hired Ettore Bugatti for automobile design and Emil Mathis for marketing before eventually focusing on mechanical engineering and railway equipment by 1905.

=== 1990s: Refocusing the group ===
==== 1992: Acquisition of Cogifer and sale of De Dietrich Électroménager ====
In 1992, De Dietrich took control of the Cogifer group (railway installations) and sold its home appliance division to Thomson.

==== 1995: Sale of De Dietrich Ferroviaire ====
In 1995, De Dietrich ceded control of its rolling stock division, De Dietrich Ferroviaire in Reichshoffen, to Alstom. In 2000, the chemical equipment division was renamed "De Dietrich Process Systems."

In July 2001, after fifty years of listing, De Dietrich was delisted from the stock exchange. In December 2002, the Société Industrielle du Hanau absorbed De Dietrich & Cie and took back the name "De Dietrich."

==== 2004: Sale of De Dietrich Thermique ====
In July 2004, De Dietrich sold its thermal division (De Dietrich Thermique) to the Dutch manufacturer Remeha.

In December 2004, Financière Jaegerthal, entirely owned by the De Dietrich family, regained 100% control of De Dietrich Process Systems. In 2023, the family group bought back the shares held by Bpifrance since 2011.

== Former subsidiaries ==
=== De Dietrich Thermique ===
Following its sale in 2004, the entity became part of the De Dietrich Remeha group. In 2009, it merged with Baxi to form BDR Thermea.

=== De Dietrich Électroménager ===
In 2013, Fagor-Brandt (then owner of the brand) filed for bankruptcy. In 2014, it was acquired by the Algerian conglomerate Cevital.
