= De Dietrich =

French family and holding company

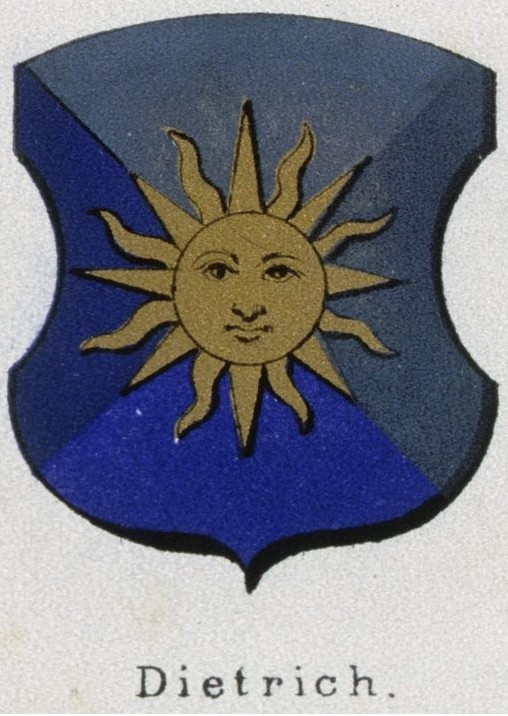
- De Dietrich family coat of arms
- Current region: France
- Origin: Europe
- Members: Philippe-Frédéric de Dietrich

The history of the de Dietrich family has been linked to that of France and of Europe for over three centuries. To this day, the company that bears the family name continues to play a major role in the economic life of Alsace. De Dietrich is a holding company based in France which traces its history back to 1684. The incumbent chairman of the supervisory board Marc-Antoine de Dietrich represents the 11th consecutive generation at the helm of the company. De Dietrich has been active in the automobile, railway and industrial equipment industry amongst others.

== History ==
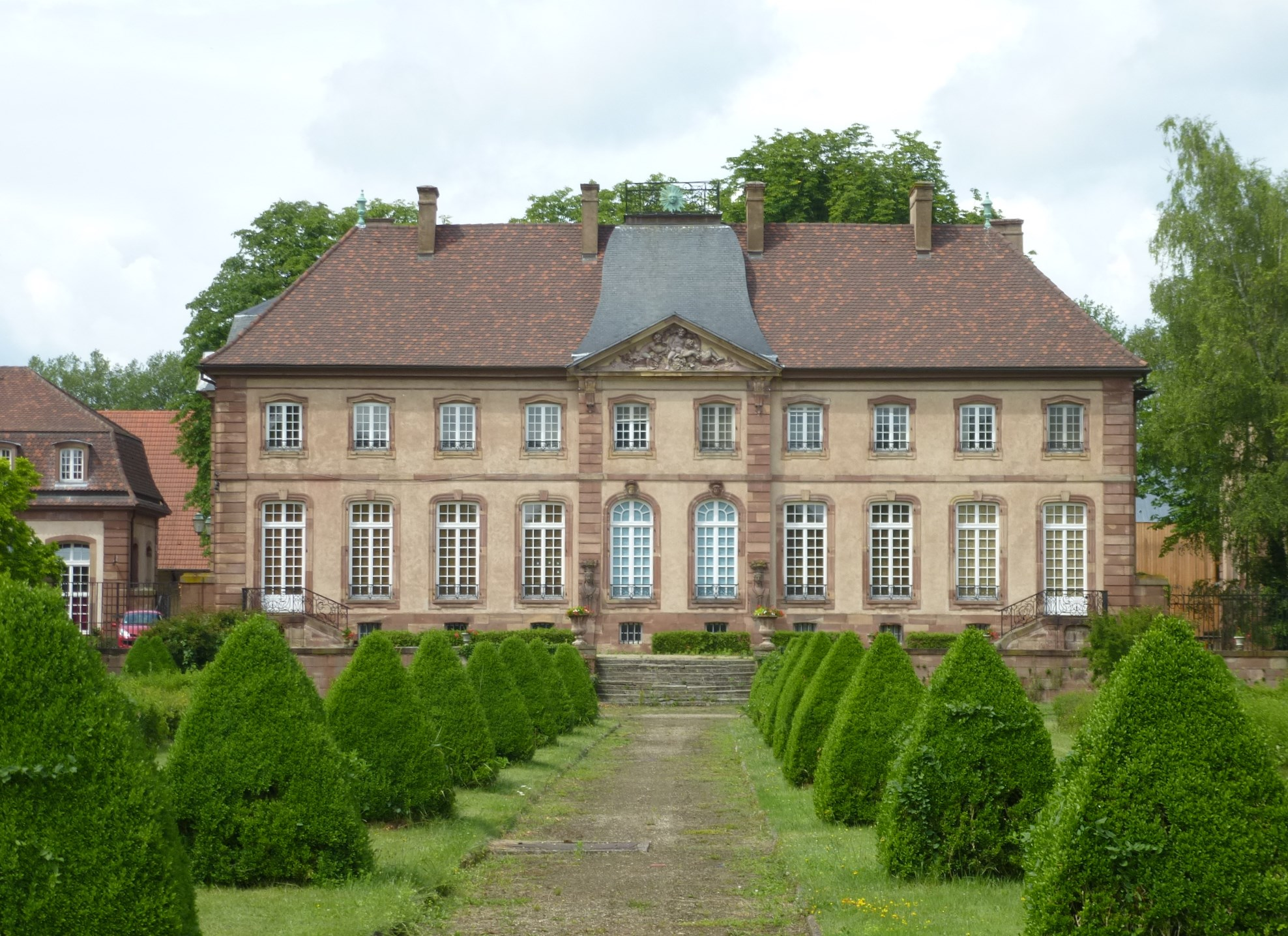
South side of Château d'Angleterre seen through the gardens in 2013

1684 : Johann von Dietrich acquires the Jaegerthal forge.

1719 : The family is made Baron by the Holy Roman Empire.

1749-1751 : Baron Jean de Dietrich has the castle and gardens of Château de la Cour d'Angleterre built in Bischheim near Strasbourg

1761 : Baron Jean de Dietrich is made Count du Ban de la Roche by Louis XV. He becomes the largest land owner in Alsace and expands the family's industrial empire by building or acquiring forges and furnaces.

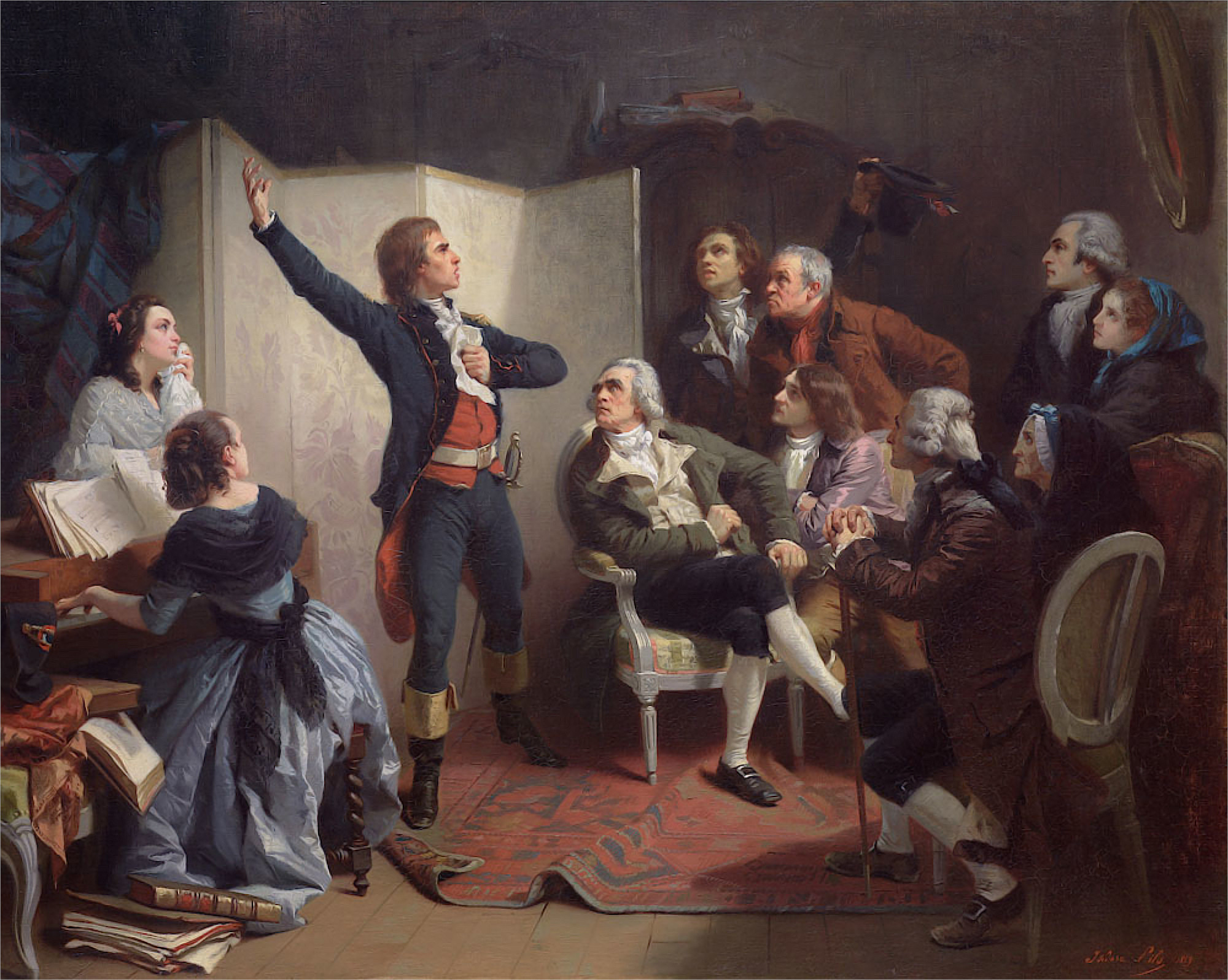
Rouget de Lisle singing the "Marseillaise" - Pils

1778 : Louis XVI grants Jean de Dietrich the use of a hunting horn trademark to deter counterfeiters. This logo still serves as a symbol of quality today.

1792 : Philippe-Frédéric de Dietrich (Jean's son), first mayor of Strasbourg in republican France, orders captain Rouget de Lisle to compose a military hymn for the Army of the Rhine. First sung in Philippe-Frederic's parlor on Place Broglie, "La Marseillaise" became France's national anthem.

1848 : De Dietrich embraces the industrial era by progressively reducing the production of cast irons in favor of mechanical and railroad equipment.

1870 : Despite the annexation by Germany of Alsace-Lorraine, the Dietrich family decides to remain close to the factories and employees and stays in Alsace. This choice calls for a diversification of De Dietrich's activities in order to adapt to German market demands and having been effectively shut out of the French railroad market. The company then turns towards consumer durables: stoves, cookers, wooden furniture, enameled cast iron bathtubs – and urban or industrial equipment – tramways, distillation equipment, industry specific wagons.

1896 : De Dietrich enters automobile manufacturing. Eugene, Baron de Turckheim, buys manufacturing rights to Amédée Bollée, fils' design. During its automotive development it hired amongst others the services of famous car builder Ettore Bugatti to design of the cars and Émile Mathis to handle commercialization.

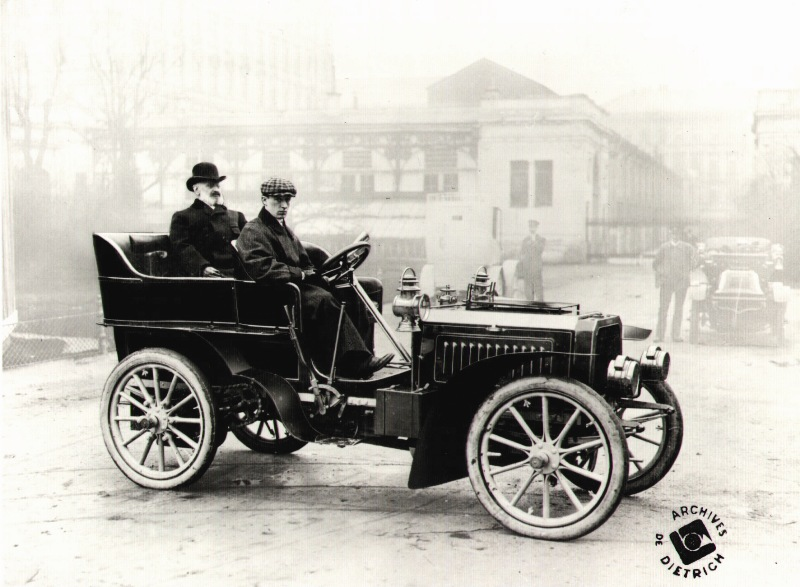
Bugatti's first car

Logo for the Lorraine-Dietrich cars

1905 : De Dietrich decides to pull out of automobile manufacturing to focus on mechanical construction, railroad equipment, process systems, central heating equipment and appliances.

1992 : De Dietrich assumes control of Cogifer, market leader fixed railroad installations and forgives control of the appliances business to Thomson, control later on assumed by Fagor-Brandt until this day.

1995 : De Dietrich sells its interest in rolling stock railroad equipment manufacturing "De Dietrich Ferroviaire" (DDF's factory is in Reichshoffen". A majority stake in DDF was acquired by Alstom and the company is now known as Alstom-DDF.

2000 : After the successive acquisitions of Rosenmund-Guedu and QVF, De Dietrich renames its chemical equipment division "De Dietrich Process Systems". De Dietrich is the object of a Public Tender Offer by the la Société Industrielle du Hanau (SIH), controlled by ABN AMRO Capital Investissement France and the De Dietrich family.

2001 : In July 2001, after 50 years of quotation, De Dietrich was pulled out the market.

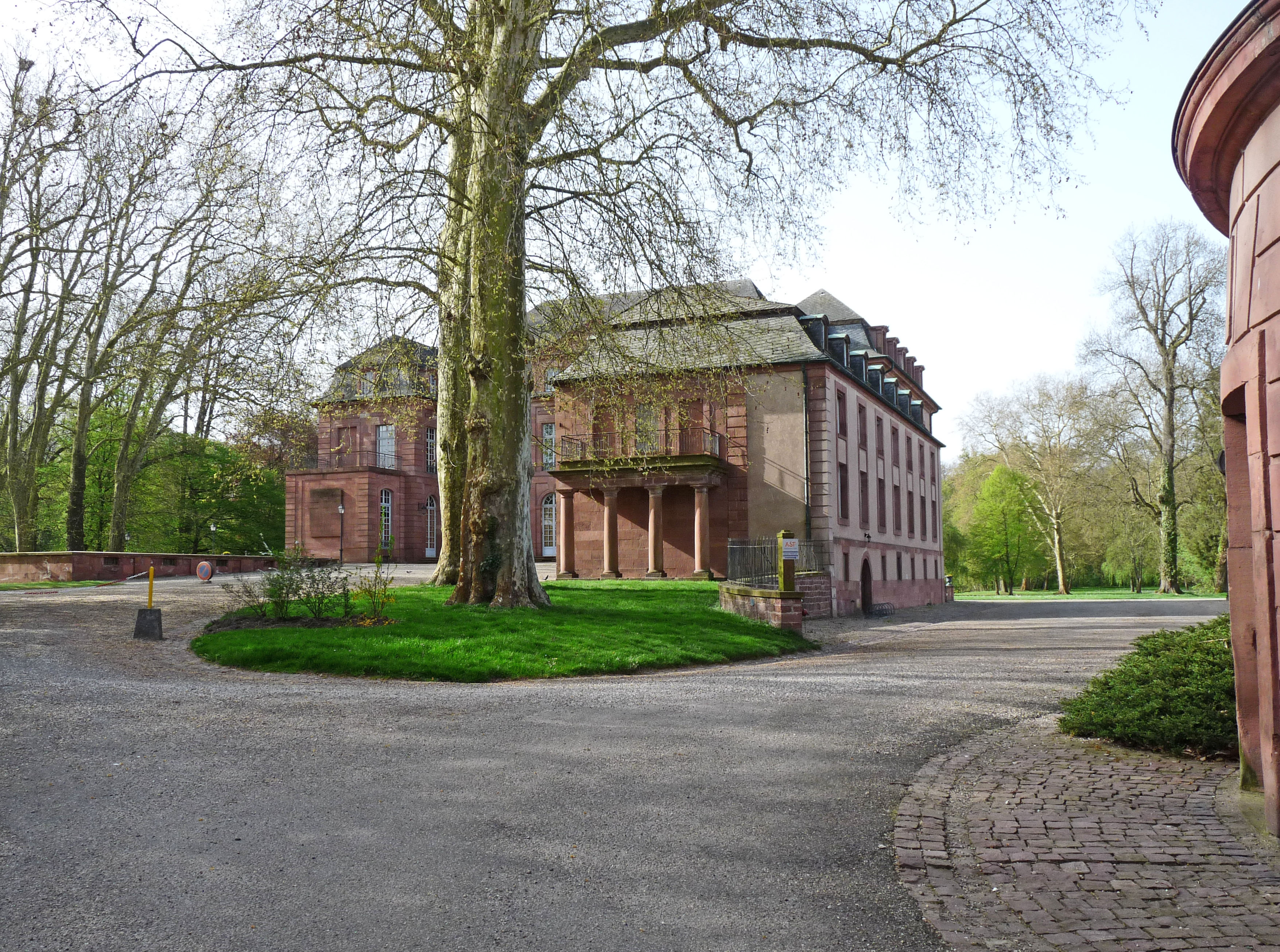
Château De Dietrich - De Dietrich Headquarters - Reichshoffen

2002 : In September 2002, De Dietrich sells the control of Cogifer and Cogifer TF, to Vossloh a German Industrial group specialized in railroad equipment. In December 2002, the "Société Industrielles du Hanau" takes over De Dietrich & Cie and assumeed the name "De Dietrich".

2004 : In July 2004, De Dietrich divests from "De Dietrich Thermique", the market leader in water heating equipment to Remeha. The new entity formed De Dietrich Remeha, becomes one of Europe's largest heating industry player, particularly in the fields of condensing boilers and renewable energies.

In December 2004, the family regained 100% control of the holding company. This operation represents one of Europe's largest family re-investments in recent years. De Dietrich today focuses on De Dietrich Process Systems (DDPS). DDPS is a leading worldwide provider of API process and other process equipment to the pharmaceutical and fine chemical industries.

== Genealogy ==
Demange Dietrich (1549-1620), Strasbourg bourgeois
x Anne Heller
│
└── Jean Dietrich (17 février 1579-1642), councilman and merchant in Strasbourg
    x Agnès Meyer
    │
    └── Dominique Dietrich (1620-1694), "amnestre" of Strasbourg (Mayor)
        x Ursule Wencker (1627-1662)
        │
        └── Jean-Nicolas Dietrich (1688-1726), merchant, banker
            x Marie-Barbe Kniebs (1665-1747)
            │
            └── Jean de Dietrich (1719-1795), Count of the "Ban de la Roche"
                x Amélie Hermanny (1729-1766)
                │
                ├── Jean de Dietrich (1746-1805)
                │   x Louise-Sophie de Glaubitz (1751-1806)
                │
                └── Philippe-Frédéric de Dietrich (1748- beheaded 1793), mayor of Strasbourg
                    x Sybille-Louise Ochs (1755-1806)
                    │
                    └── Jean-Albert de Dietrich (1773-1806), head of Bas-Rhin region
                        x Amélie de Berckheim (1776-1855)
                        │
                        ├── Amélie de Dietrich (1799-1854)
                        │   x Guillaume de Turckheim (1785-1831), Major
                        │
                        ├── Baron Albert de Dietrich (1802-1888),
                        │   x 1828 Octavie von Stein (1801-1839)
                        │   │
                        │   ├── Baron Albert de Dietrich (1831-)
                        │   │   x Sophie von und zu der Tann-Rathsamhausen (1832-1890)
                        │   │
                        │   x 1840 Adélaïde von Stein
                        │   │
                        │   └── Eugène-Dominique de Dietrich (1844-1918), deputy for Alsace at the Reichstag
                        │       x Cécile Vaucher
                        │       │
                        │       └── Dominique de Dietrich (1892-1963),
                        │           x Inès-Agnès de Pourtalès
                        │           │
                        │           └── Gilbert de Dietrich (1928-2006), CEO of De Dietrich from 1968 to 1996
                        │               x Suzanne Syz (29 août 1925 - 15 février 1975)
                        │               │
                        │               └── Baron Marc-Antoine de Dietrich, Incumbent Chairman of De Dietrich Supervisory board
                        │                   x Catherine Probst
                        |                   |     
                        │                   └── Gaetan de Dietrich, Olympia de Dietrich, Amaury de Dietrich   
                        │
                        └── Jean-Sigismond de Dietrich (1803-1868),
                            x Virginie Mathis (1810-1867)
                            │
                            └── Amélie de Dietrich (1841-1874)
                                x Baron Édouard de Turkheim

== See also ==
- La Marseillaise
- Ettore Bugatti
- De Dietrich Ferroviaire
