= Lili Schönemann =

"Lili" Schönemann "Lilli" von Türckheim
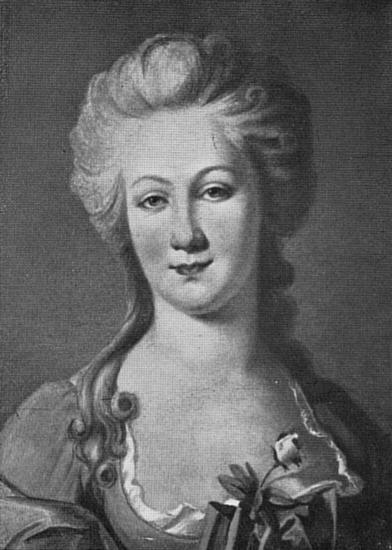
- Lili Schöneman ca. 1775
- Born: Anna Elisabeth Schönemann; 23 June 1758; Offenbach, Isenburg-Birstein
- Died: 6 May 1817 (aged 58); Krautergersheim, Bas-Rhin, France
- Occupation(s): Society beauty Wife and mother
- Known for: Goethe's lover January–October 1775
- Spouse: Bernhardt Friedrich von Türckheim (1752-1831)
- Children: (all von Türckheim); Lili (1779-); Johann Friedrich (1780-1850); Johann Carl (1783-1862); Friedrich Wilhelm (1785-1831); Heinrich (1789-1849)
- Parent(s): Johann Wolfgang Schönemann (1717-1763) & Susanne Elisabeth d'Orville

Anna Elisabeth "Lili" Schönemann (23 June 1758 - 6 May 1817) was the daughter of a Frankfurt banker. In August 1778 she became engaged to, and then married, another banker, Bernhardt Friedrich von Türckheim, and her name became "Lilli" von Türckheim. Before that happened, however, between January and October 1775 she was engaged in an intense love affair with Johann Wolfgang von Goethe, described in one source as his "first great love". Memories lingered: towards the end of his life, conversing with his young friend Johann Peter Eckermann, Goethe recalled that he had loved Lili profoundly and had never been so close to happiness as he was with her. She featured repeatedly in his written work, identified simply as "Lili" or, according to some sources, as "Lilli".

Lili Schönemann's descendants include the comedienne Charlotte de Turckheim.

== Life ==
Anna Elisabeth "Lili" Schönemann was born in Offenbach, at that time a prosperous town separated by the river from Frankfurt am Main. Johann Wolfgang Schönemann, her father, was a wealthy banker. However, he died in 1763 leaving his wife, born Susanna Elisabet d’Orville, to bring up the children, which she accomplished while also preserving the Schönemann bank. The d’Orville family was an aristocratic one that traced its ancestry back to Huguenot refugees forced to leave France in the aftermath of the 1685 Edict of Fontainebleau and involved in manufacturing through part-ownership of a snuff/tobacco factory in Offenbach, where Frankfurt's restrictions on manufacturing did not apply. Two of Anna Elisabeth's sibling died in infancy, and she grew up as the only surviving daughter, among the five surviving siblings. All the children received a good education which, at least in Lili's case, extended to include History, Geography and Music.

In 1770 Lili's mother spent 40,000 florins to have the house at Kornmarkt 15 in Frankfurt rebuilt. Here she established a high-profile Rococo Salon where she was able to entertain Frankfurt high society and business / banking associates. In 1772 Lili's eldest brother was old enough to join the bank which opened the way for business expansion: the extravagantly fashionable salon was both a result of and a supportive element in the expansion.

In the winter of 1774/75 Lili was 16. Johann Wolfgang von Goethe was 25, a qualified lawyer, and already established as a literary celebrity. It was at this time that Goethe was introduced by a musical friend - possibly Johann André - to Mrs. Schönemann's Salon where he attended a concert and immediately, it is recorded, fell for the daughter of the house. Subsequently, it appears that the visits he made to Lili were generally to the Schönemann family home, across the river in Offenbach, and it is here, on the front of the house, that a plaque commemorates their amorous affair during the summer of 1775. More precisely, what one source describes as their "stormy year of ups and downs" lasted from January till October 1775. The two became engaged over or shortly after Easter in 1775 following Goethe's return from a two-week break in Switzerland, which he had undertaken in order to "test his feelings".

It was in April 1775 that a mutual friend let the lovers know that they had their parents' approval. This appears to have been less than the whole truth, however. Mrs. Schönemann was a hardheaded businesswoman who had already "pencilled in" a cousin by the name of J. Manskopf as a suitable future husband for her only daughter. Mrs. Schönemann was appreciative of Goethe's intellectual qualities and exceptional brilliance and would not have presumed to try and force her daughter into a loveless marriage against the latter's will, but Lili herself will have been aware of the conventional expectation that as a banker's daughter she would normally have looked forward to a dynastic marriage, designed to further the business interests of the families involved. Her four brothers were unimpressed by Goethe. Goethe himself had been on bad terms with his father for years, but his mother did not conceal her reservations about the possibility of her son marrying a banker's daughter and Goethe's only surviving sibling, Cornelie Schlosser, opposed the idea of a permanent liaison from the outset. Also, the families came from different religious traditions.

It seems that even as summer ended Lili, still aged only 17, was prepared to abandon her other relationships for Goethe, but he was more conflicted and, in the end, unwilling to commit. When he received an invitation to take a position with the Duke of Saxe-Weimar-Eisenach, he saw it as an opportunity to escape from this "girl who seemed to paralyze his will". Accordingly, the lovers were parted in October 1775. Goethe was a writer whose life experiences provided him with material, and his own thoughts and regrets over the affair are repeatedly addressed in his published output. Less is known about how Lili felt about the matter at the time. Much later, after 1795, she would celebrate him as the creator of her moral existence, and an unforgettable friend to whom she owed her intellectual education.

After the break with Goethe a second engagement was hastily arranged for Lili. Her new fiancé, identified by her mother for her, was a wealthy cousin, of the co-owners of the Offenbach snuff/tobacco factory. He seemed highly suitable. Johann Friedrich Bernard lived in Strasbourg and was the owner of a steel plant in Elsass, a frontier region that had been incorporated into France more than a century before, but which throughout the eighteenth century had remained culturally, linguistically and for most purposes economically more German than Francophone. The engagement with Bernard was called off in 1776, however. He had only recently inherited the family steel plant, and when he went to investigate it he discovered that its value - and accordingly his own value as a potential husband - had been very greatly over-stated. In despair, he fled to America and then to Jamaica in order to make his fortune. Instead, quite soon he died.

The emotional and physical impact of two failed engagements in two years took its toll, from which Lili did not immediately recover. However, in August 1778 she became engaged for the third time, this time to the Strasbourg banker Bernhard von Türckheim. He had been a trainee banker at the Schönemann bank in Frankfurt even before Lili had met Goethe and, it was said, had been among her admirers even then. However, as a younger son he had, at that stage, not been financially independent, and so there would have been no question of his pursuing the matter further. By 1778 his financial prospects had improved. Their marriage took place on 25 August 1778 and slightly less than a year later the couple's first child, also called Lili, was born on 9 August 1779. Fours sons followed. In 1784 the Schönemann bank in Frankfurt failed. The von Türckheim family had by this stage relocated to Strasbourg where Bernhard's business appears to have flourished. Lili concentrated on the education of their children and on keeping a fashionably hospitable house. Franz Heinrich Redslob was recruited as a tutor for the children. Other regular guests included Landolin Ohmacht and Jean-Urbain Guérin. In addition, Bernhard von Türckheim and his brother Johann were at the core of Freemasonry in Elsass.

In 1792 Bernhard von Türckheim was appointed mayor of Strasbourg, albeit serving only briefly. Political instability had been on the rise as the outbreak of revolution in Paris had radiated out across various parts of France, and a few months later he was deposed from the office. The family appear to have retreated to the countryside, living quietly on the little farm they owned at Postroff, a mountain village a day's ride to the north-west of Strasbourg. However, as the savage tide of violence spread to the countryside, fearing arrest, on 6 July 1794 Bernhard managed to escape via Saarbrücken. Dressed as a simple country farmers' wife, Lili took her children and made her way past the frontier posts set up by the revolutionary authorities, meeting up with her husband at Mannheim. The family settled in Heidelberg. They had lost their position of wealth and privilege, but despite the sudden poverty Lili was apparently able to embark on the life of a penniless housewife while remaining cheerful to be alive. Later they relocated to Erlangen. As matters turned out, their enforced exile did not have much longer to run, however. In Paris Robespierre fell from power in July 1794. A powerful mood of revulsion against the blood letting took hold. Bernhard von Türckheim, learning that he had not been listed as a "wanted emigrant", felt able to return to Strasburg in June 1795. At the end of September 1795 Lili and the children, travelling via Stuttgart and Basel, were able to join him. According to one source, during their time in Germany she had also been able to spend a few weeks in Frankfurt.

Over the next few years, the Türckheims were able to restore much of their former wealth. Bernhard had grown up in a tradition of public service and as an admirer of Necker: at one stage he was given a job as Finance Minister in Baden, though the appointment proved to be of short duration. Later, following the restoration, he would be elected to the national parliament three times. Lili remained focused on bringing up the children. According to one source it was in 1800 that their eldest daughter, also (confusingly) called Lili, married: von Türckheim was able to acquire the Krautergersheim estate on the north side of Strasbourg which is where he and his wife, from now on, appear to have lived. During the early years of the nineteenth century she entered into a renewed correspondence with Goethe. Goethe was by this time in a position of some political power and influence at the Court of Weimar, and Lili's principal purpose in contacting her former lover appears to have been to request (without success) his protection for a young acquaintance. From Goethe's diary entry of 1. October 1806 it is also apparent that she mentioned to him her younger son William, who at the time was participating as a Hussar Lieutenant in Napoleon's campaigns in Germany, Spain and Russia. (William survived the experience.)

Aged 58, "Lilli" von Türckheim died at Krautergersheim on 6 May 1817. She was buried alongside her husband in the heart of the village in a little chapel which has subsequently acquired the address 12, Rue Clemenceau.
