= Château de Dietrich =

Château in Bas-Rhin, Alsace, France

Coordinates: 48°55′48″N 7°39′53″E

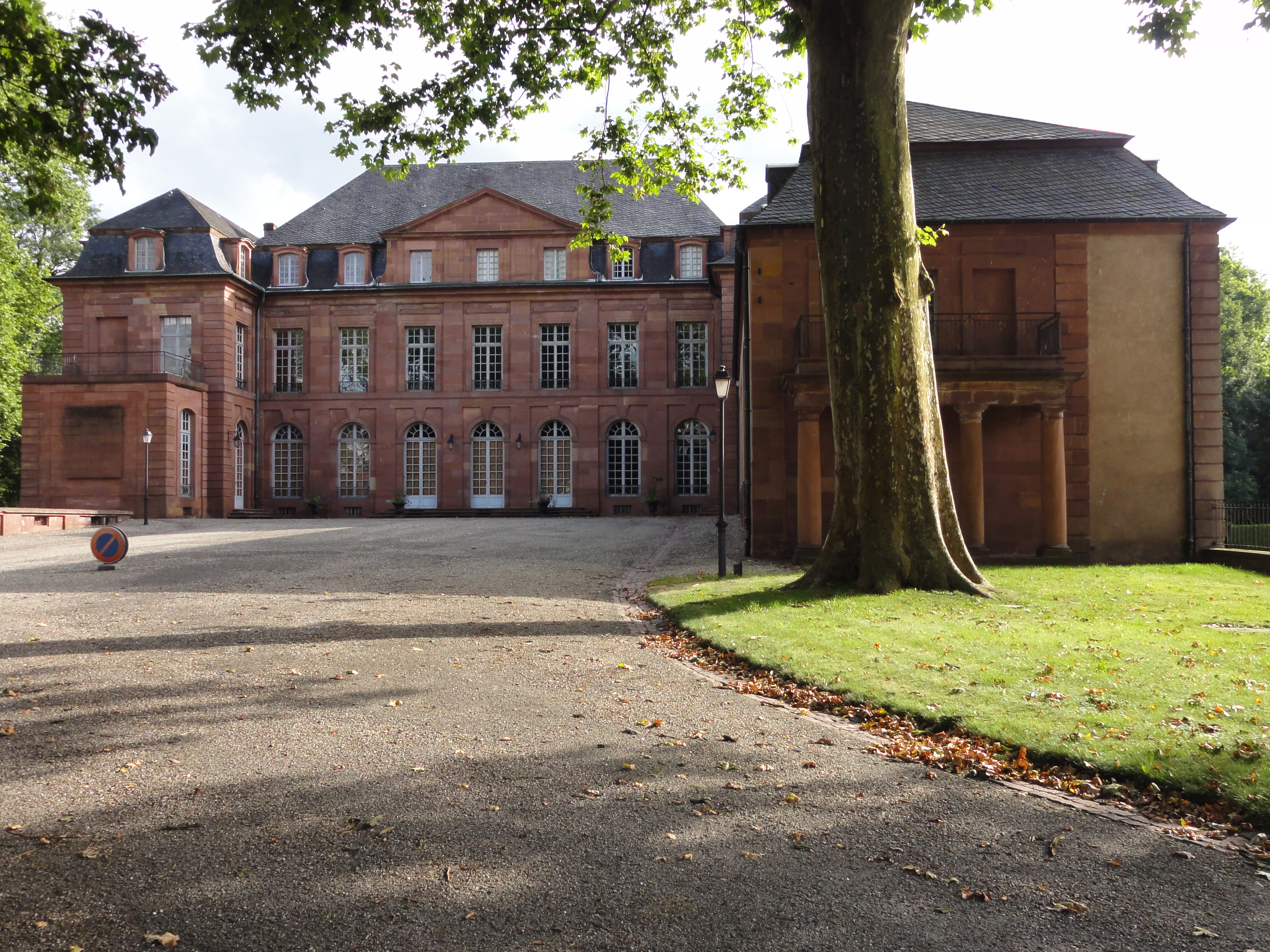
Château de Dietrich, Reichshoffen

The Château de Dietrich is a château in the commune of Reichshoffen, Bas-Rhin, Alsace, France.

It was built in 1770 and was registered as a monument historique in 1940.
