= Baxi =

British heating systems manufacturer

Baxi Heating UK Limited
- Type: Private
- Industry: Heating
- Founded: 1866; 160 years ago (as R. Baxendale Preston)
- Founder: Richard Baxendale
- Defunct: July 2010; 16 years ago (Baxi Group)
- Fate: Merged with De Dietrich Remeha (Baxi Group)
- Successor: BDR Thermea
- Headquarters: Warwick, England
- Area served: Worldwide
- Key people: Jason Baldock (MD) (Since 2025)
- Products: Boilers, solar thermal, biomass, micro-CHP
- Services: Service, maintenance and repair of boilers
- Owner: BC Partners and Electra
- Number of employees: 6,400 (worldwide)
- Parent: BDR Thermea
- Divisions: UK: Baxi Domestic, Potterton Commercial, Andrews Water Heaters, Potterton, Heatrae Sadia, Main Heating, Remeha Commercial, Elson, Santon, heateam, interpart
- Website: baxi.co.uk

Baxi is a manufacturer and distributor of domestic and commercial water and space heating systems, based in Warwick, England. It is a subsidiary of European group BDR Thermea.

Baxi employs 6,400 people throughout Europe, with a turnover exceeding €1.2 billion. The group has significant market shares across all major continental territories and in the United Kingdom. It is also expanding into new markets such as Romania and Argentina and already has a direct presence in Russia, China and the Czech Republic. It has a presence of joint venture partnerships in developing locations, like Turkey.

Today, BDR Thermea owns and sells some of the leading brands in the European market for heating products.

It is known under various pseudonyms worldwide, including Chappée and Ideal Standard in France, Roca in Spain, and Broetje in Germany.

Baxi operates three sites in the UK: Warwick, Preston and Wokingham. There are also numerous training centers nationwide, including Dartford and Godmanchester.

Its investment is based on boiler products and renewable technologies, including solar thermal hot water systems, ground source heat pumps, air source heat pumps, biomass boilers and micro combined heat and power with baxi-innotech.

== History ==
The group can trace its beginnings back over 150 years to Richard Baxendale, an iron founder, who began the Baxendale Company (R. Baxendale Preston) in 1866, based in Preston in Lancashire. Since the company was founded, it has been responsible for many of the key engineering breakthroughs which have revolutionized the boiler market.

The Former Baxi Group was formed in November 2000 after the merger of the heating interests of Newmond plc (formerly the European Building Products Division of Williams Holding plc) and Baxi Holdings plc.

== Baxi International ==
Baxi International, a division of the Baxi Group, was formed in 2002 to manage the group's international sales, marketing, and after-sales activities in more than 70 countries across the world.

=== Joint ventures ===
Strategic acquisitions and joint ventures since 2000 have included Baymak (Turkey joint venture), Baxi Belgium, SenerTec (combined heat and power), European Fuel Cell (fuel cell technology) and Roca Heating, the market leader in residential heating equipment in Spain and Portugal.

In October 2004, Baxi Holding Ltd sold the Aqualisa division, to a management buy-out backed by CBPE Capital for £82.5 million.

== Baxi in England ==
=== Preston ===
The company continues to be a major employer in Preston at the manufacturing and testing facility.

Baxi is former owner and sponsor of Preston North End, having taken over the club in summer 1994 when it had been in serious financial difficulty for several years. Baxi's chief executive Bryan Gray became club chairman. One of the first announcements by the new board was that Deepdale, until then a dilapidated stadium owned by Preston Council, would be upgraded into a modern stadium after the injection of extra funds by Baxi and from a subsequent new share issue.

Gray resigned as club chairman in the autumn of 2001 and Baxi declined to appoint a replacement, so it was immediately clear that the company intended to sell its holding in the club. By this time, three of the four new stands at Deepdale had been rebuilt and reopened but work on the fourth was delayed by several years following the collapse of ITV Digital, which cost the club an income of £4.6 million over the next two years (the stand was finally opened in 2008). The club was initially bought by existing directors and sponsors but has subsequently been taken over by Lancashire businessman Trevor Hemmings.

=== Warwick ===
The company's contact centre currently employs some 100 call handlers working from offices based in Brooks House, Warwick. Handling customer enquiries relating to heating system breakdowns, the contact centre also provides a technical helpdesk and handles approximately 6,000 calls per day.

== Merge ==
In July 2010, the group agreed to merge with Netherlands business rival De Dietrich Remeha to form BDR Thermea.

== Baxi Partnership ==
Baxi Partnership Limited Trusts Act 2000
- Act of Parliament
- Parliament of the United Kingdom
- Long title: An Act to confirm the validity of and vary the trusts of a settlement created by Baxi Partnership Limited for the benefit of employees of Baxi Partnership Limited; to modify certain provisions of the settlement; to confer powers on the trustees of that settlement; and for other purposes.
- Citation: 2000 c. iv

Dates
- Royal assent: 10 February 2000

Text of statute as originally enacted

It is Britain's largest employee owned manufacturing company. The original company was left in a trust for the benefit of its employees. The trust required an act of Parliament specially to set it up because UK trust laws placed restrictions on trust and the original intentions of the trust not being compatible. This resulted in the Baxi Partnership Limited Trusts Act 2000 (c. iv) being enacted.

The BDR Thermea employs more than 5,400 people throughout Europe with a turnover of £850 million.

== Products ==
- Baxi Toolbelt app
- Benchmark Checklist app

== UK subsidiaries and locations ==
- Andrews Water Heaters – Wokingham
- Baxi – Preston
- Baxi Customer Support (Servicing) – Warwick
- Baxi Genuine Parts – Warwick
- Elson – Preston
- Heatrae Sadia – Preston
- Main – Warwick
- Potterton – Warwick
- Potterton Commercial – Wokingham
- Santon – Preston
- Remeha Commercial – Wokingham Not a subsidiary of Baxi

== Overseas subsidiaries and locations ==
- BAXI – Bassano del Grappa (Italy)
- Baymak (Turkey joint venture),
- CSE (now renamed Baxi Belgium),
- SenerTec (Combined Heat and Power specialists),
- European Fuel Cell
- Roca Heating (2005), in Spain and Portugal.
- Brötje in Germany
- Chappée in France

== See also ==
- Top Track 100 – Baxi is No. 52 in the list of biggest private companies.
