= Jean-Frédéric de Turckheim =

French politician

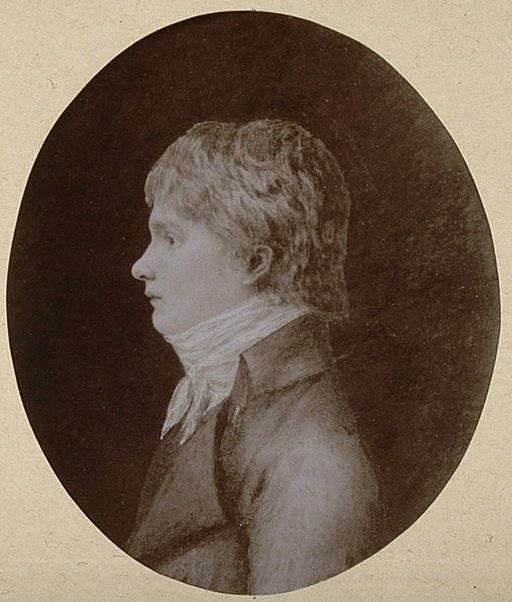

Mayor of Strasbourg
- In office 1830–1835
- Preceded by: François Xavier Antoine de Kentzinger
- Succeeded by: Antoine François Thomas Lacombe

Personal details
- Born: 10 December 1780 Strasbourg
- Died: 13 December 1850 (aged 70) Paris, France
- Spouse: Friederike von Degenfeld-Schonburg
- Relations: Johann von Türckheim (uncle)
- Parents: Bernard-Frédéric de Turckheim (father); Lili Schönemann (mother)
- Occupation: Banker, philosopher, politician

Jean-Frédéric de Turckheim (10 December 1780, in Strasbourg – 13 December 1850, in Paris) was a French politician.

He conducted a thwarted campaign for deputy, 27 February 1824, in the 4th electoral district of Bas-Rhin against Georges Humann, the banker and financier, he was elected in the Grand college in the same department.

== Family ==
He was one of four sons of Bernard Turckheim and Lili Schönenmann: Jean-Frédéric, Jean-Charles, Frédéric-Guillaume and Henri.

His mother, Lili, (23 June 1758 at Frankfort – 1817) had been engaged to Johann Wolfgang von Goethe in 1775, but married Bernard Turckheim on 25 August 1778.

Preceded by François Xavier Antoine de Kentzinger	Mayor of Strasbourg; 1830-1835	Succeeded by Antoine François Thomas Lacombe
