= Rudolf Schwander =

German politician (1868–1950)

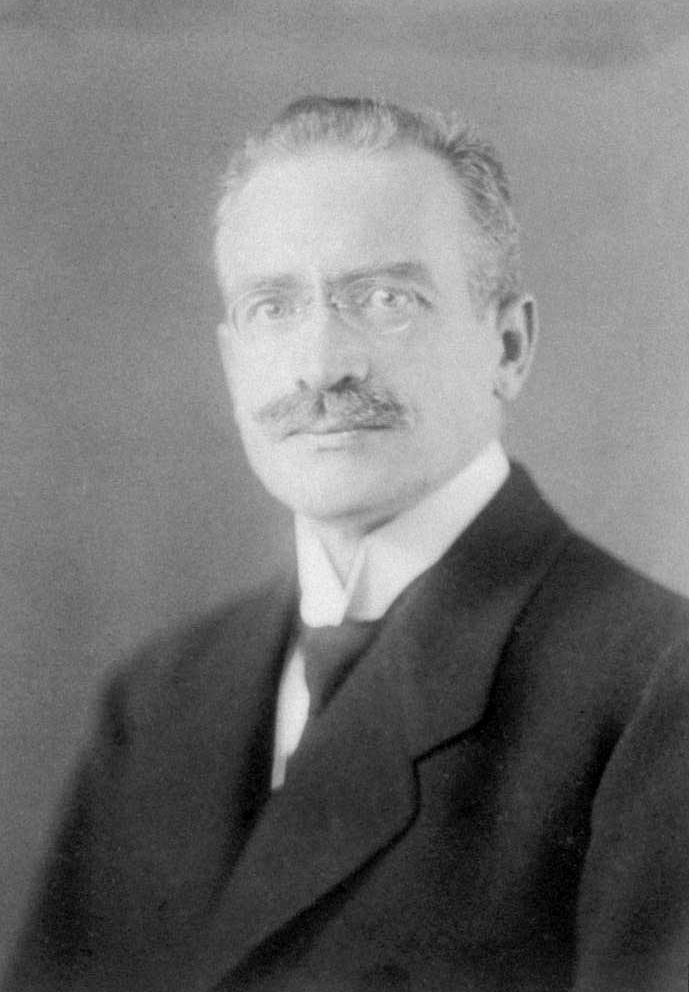
Rudolf Schwander

Rudolf Schwander (23 December 1868 – 25 December 1950) was a German politician and social reformer. He was, among other things, the Mayor of Strasbourg and the Oberpräsident of the Province of Hesse-Nassau.

== Life ==
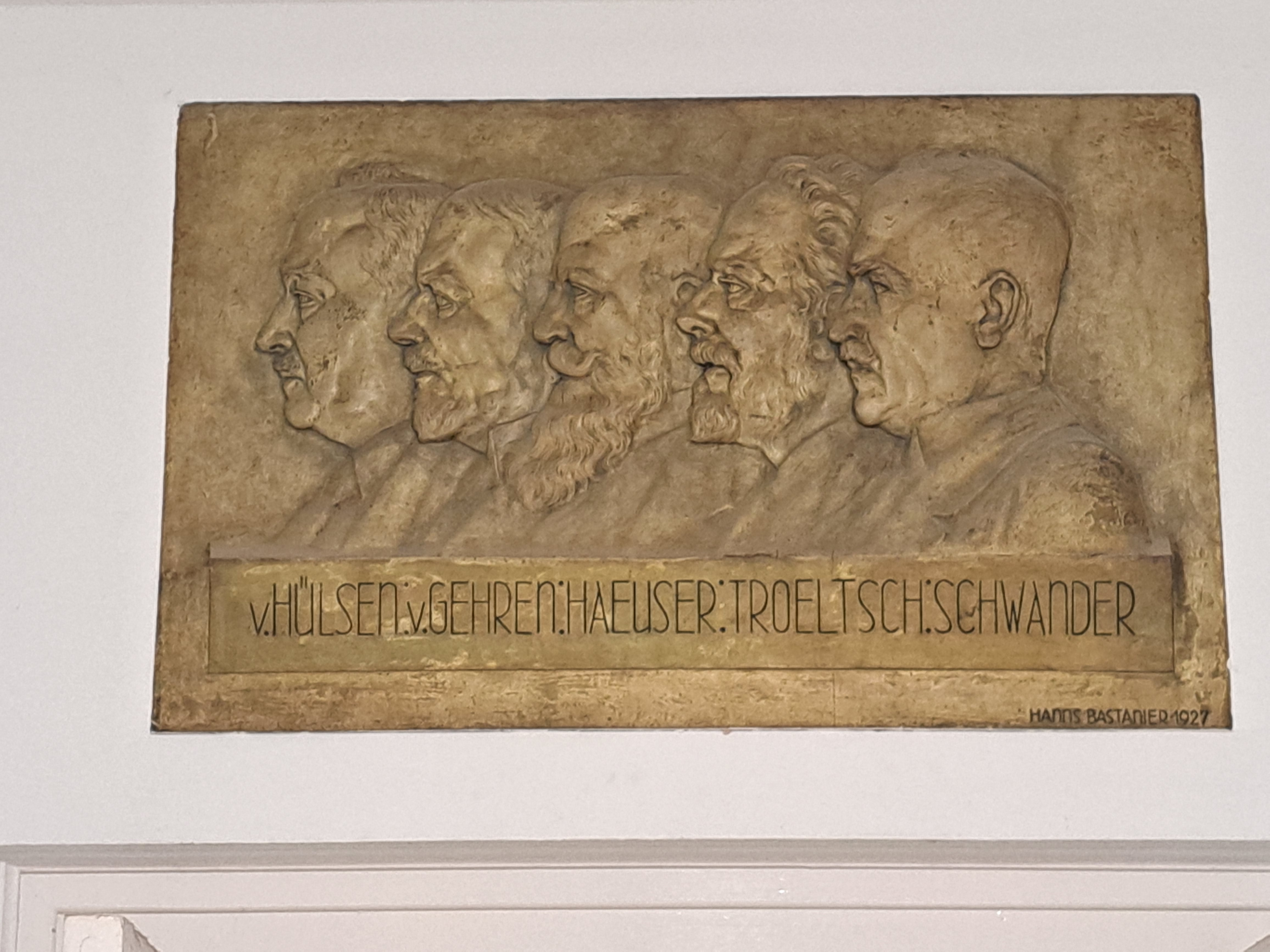
Schwander's profile (on the extreme right), relief in the Kunstgebäude of Marburg university

Born in Alsace (which was then French, but became part of the German Empire three years later), Rudolf Schwander was the son of Anne Barbe Schwander and, according to widespread rumour, the Mayor of Colmar, Camille Schlumberger. After attending elementary school and special school, Schwander first worked as a clerk and office assistant in his native town of Colmar, but graduated from high school at the same time. Between 1897 and 1901, he studied law and political science at the University of Strasbourg and received his doctorate in political science in 1904 with a thesis on the French welfare system.

Schwander entered the city service in 1900 and took over the management of poverty relief and hospital administration; two years later he also became a deputy mayor of Strasbourg. Influenced by Friedrich Naumann, he subsequently carried out groundbreaking social reforms and established the Strasbourg system in 1905. Local authorities – so-called poor officers – were given the task of screening residents for their needs and deciding whether they were entitled to public support, unlike under the Elberfeld system where they would receive support from volunteers alone. While female volunteers were responsible for on-site advice and evaluation, full-time male employees were responsible for the assessments in the administrative offices. By abolishing the Elberfield System, Schwander took the first step towards professional social assistance.

In 1906, Schwander was appointed mayor of Strasbourg. As such, in April 1908 he oversaw the marriage of Elly Knapp, who was born in Strasbourg and whom he had supported earlier, with Naumann's close associate Theodor Heuss. A brief interlude as acting state secretary in the Reich Economics Office in 1917 was followed in June 1918 by his return to Strasbourg city hall. From 1911, he was a member of the 1st Chamber of the Landtag of Alsace-Lorraine. In October 1918, he became the last Reichsstatthalter (Reich governor) in Alsace–Lorraine, but was unable to prevent its subsequent separation from Germany after the war.

During the Weimar Republic, Schwander was affiliated with the left-liberal German Democratic Party (DDP). On 8 July 1919, he took office as the Oberpräsident of the Prussian province of Hesse-Nassau, with its capital in Kassel. He also served as the state commissioner for the Hessian universities at Marburg and Frankfurt am Main. Schwander retired in 1930.
