= Ettenheim =

German city

- City
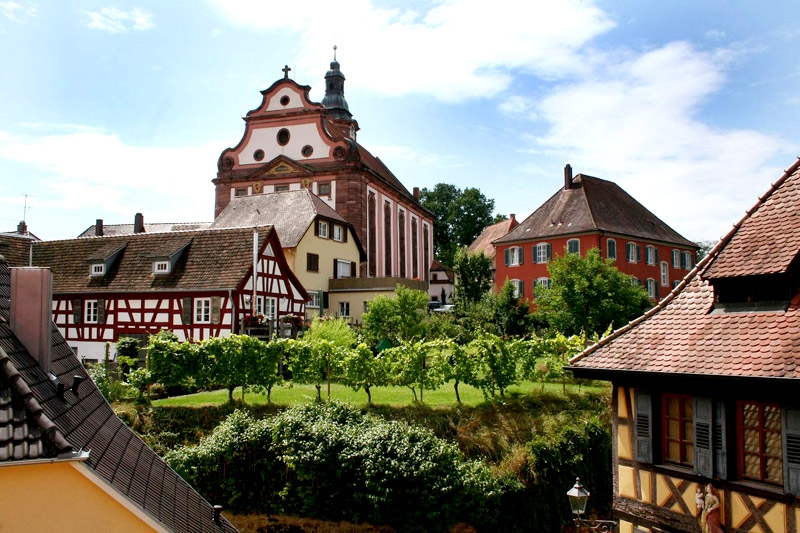
- St. Bartholomew's Church, Ettenheim

- Coat of arms

- Location of Ettenheim within Ortenaukreis district
- Interactive map of Ettenheim
- Location within Germany Location within Baden-Württemberg
- Coordinates: 48°15′20″N 07°48′43″E
- Country: Germany
- State: Baden-Württemberg
- Admin. region: Freiburg
- District: Ortenaukreis
- Subdivisions: 5 Stadtteile

Area
  - Total: 48.8 km^{2} (18.8 sq mi)
- Elevation: 193 m (633 ft)

Population (2025-12-31)
  - Total: 13,670
  - Density: 280/km^{2} (726/sq mi)
- Time zone: UTC+01:00 (CET)
  - Summer (DST): UTC+02:00 (CEST)
- Postal codes: 77949–77955
- Dialling codes: 07822
- Vehicle registration: OG, BH, KEL, LR, WOL
- Website: www.ettenheim.de

Ettenheim (German pronunciation: [ˈɛtn̩haɪm]; Low Alemannic: Äddene) is a city in the Ortenaukreis, Baden-Württemberg, Germany.

== History ==
Ettenheim was founded in the 8th century by Eddo, bishop of Strasbourg, and the Benedictine abbey of Ettenheimmünster was founded at about that time. Ettenheim received town rights in the 13th century from the Prince-Bishop of Strasbourg, whose territory on the right bank of the Rhine Ettenheim would form the center of until 1803, when it was mediatized to the Margraviate of Baden. Karlsruhe assigned Ettenheim to the district of Mahlberg, but then in 1809 made it the seat of its own district until 1824. In 1939, Ettenheim was assigned to Landkreis Lahr, which was replaced by the 1973 Baden-Württemberg district reform with the district of Ortenau.

Louis Antoine, Duke of Enghien took refuge here in 1801 after he was suspected in a plot against Napoleon. He was arrested on 15 March 1804 and later executed in Paris. Louis René Édouard de Rohan-Guéméné, Prince-Bishop of Strasbourg, also lived here from 1790 and plotted a counter-revolution from the city. He is buried in the local Catholic church.

== Geography ==
The township (Stadt) of Ettenheim lies on the southern edge of the Ortenau district of Baden-Württemberg, along the former's border with the Emmendingen district. Ettenheim is physically located in the Middle Upper Rhineland Lowlands. The main watercourse in the municipal area is the Ettenbach, which, at the municipality's western border, marks its lowest elevation above sea level at 165 meters (541 ft) Normalnull (NN). The highest elevation, 543 meters (1,781 ft) NN, is found in the municipality's northeast, in the buntsandstein mountains of the Central Black Forest around Lahr. In the foothills of those mountains that fall within Ettenheim's municipal area are the wetlands of the Seltenbach, which are protected as the Saure Matten nature reserve.

=== Climate ===
Ettenheim's climate has mild differences between its highs and lows, with adequate year-round rainfall. The Köppen Climate Classification subtype for this climate is "Cfb" (Marine West Coast Climate/Oceanic climate), though it is close to being "humid subtropical climate" due to the mean temperatures in July and August just under 22 °C.

Climate data for Ettenheim (CFB Lahr) 2015-2020 High, Low, Mean Temperatures with precipitation + Sunny days
| Month | Jan | Feb | Mar | Apr | May | Jun | Jul | Aug | Sep | Oct | Nov | Dec | Year |
|---|---|---|---|---|---|---|---|---|---|---|---|---|---|
| Mean daily maximum °C (°F) | 6.1 (43.0) | 7.8 (46.0) | 12.5 (54.5) | 17.0 (62.6) | 20.7 (69.3) | 25.2 (77.4) | 28.0 (82.4) | 27.2 (81.0) | 22.5 (72.5) | 16.3 (61.3) | 10.5 (50.9) | 7.6 (45.7) | 16.8 (62.2) |
| Daily mean °C (°F) | 3.1 (37.6) | 3.7 (38.7) | 7.3 (45.1) | 11.0 (51.8) | 15.1 (59.2) | 19.5 (67.1) | 21.7 (71.1) | 20.5 (68.9) | 16.0 (60.8) | 11.1 (52.0) | 6.8 (44.2) | 4.5 (40.1) | 11.65 (52.97) |
| Mean daily minimum °C (°F) | −0.3 (31.5) | −0.4 (31.3) | 2 (36) | 4.7 (40.5) | 9.3 (48.7) | 13.5 (56.3) | 15.0 (59.0) | 14.1 (57.4) | 10.0 (50.0) | 6.3 (43.3) | 2.8 (37.0) | 1.1 (34.0) | 6.5 (43.7) |
| Average precipitation mm (inches) | 60 (2.4) | 40 (1.6) | 42 (1.7) | 66 (2.6) | 108 (4.3) | 69 (2.7) | 58 (2.3) | 49 (1.9) | 45 (1.8) | 44 (1.7) | 49 (1.9) | 46 (1.8) | 676 (26.6) |
| Average rainy days (≥ 0.2 mm) | 18 | 13 | 13 | 14 | 15 | 13 | 12 | 11 | 10 | 11 | 14 | 16 | 160 |
| Mean monthly sunshine hours | 53 | 95 | 152 | 193 | 216 | 244 | 274 | 244 | 196 | 109 | 63 | 56 | 1,895 |
Source: Deutscher Wetterdienst

== Politics ==
Ettenheim has five boroughs (Stadtteile): Altdorf, Ettenheim, Ettenheimmünster, Münchweier, and Wallburg.

=== Coat of arms ===
Ettenheim's coat of arms

The coat of arms of Ettenheim displays a castle in red, with an open gate and three towers (one domed) topped with crosses, upon a field of white. This pattern was designed in 1901 by the Karlsruhe General State Archives after a seal from 1545, though the tincture was decided in 1973. Since 1370, local town seals had depicted a Gothic structure with three towers and a crenelated wall, a reference to Ettenheim's defenses.

== Transportation ==
Ettenheim is connected to Germany's network of roadways by Bundesautobahn 5 and Bundesstraße 3, which pass through the city. The Mannheim–Karlsruhe–Basel railway passes through the municipality to the west of Ettenheim itself.

The next train station Orschweier is about 1 mile away.

The nearest airports to the city are:

- Strasbourg Airport, located 54 km (34 mi) north west.
- Karlsruhe/Baden-Baden Airport, located 78 km (48 mi) north east.
- EuroAirport Basel Mulhouse Freiburg, located 105 km (65 mi) south west.
- Stuttgart Airport, located 172 km (107 mi) north east.
- Zurich Airport, located 184 km (114 mi) south east.

== Notable people ==
- Johann von Türckheim (1749–1824), a French politician and a German diplomat, died locally
- Johann Baptist Weiss (1820 in Ettenheim – 1899), a German historian.
- Karl Schneider (1869–1940), ophthalmologist, pacifist and resistance fighter against Nazism
- Conrad Gröber (1872–1948), a Catholic priest and bishop; was a local priest
- Sabine Brogle (born 1965), paralympic air rifle athlete, won five Olympic medals
- Thomas Mack (born 1981), restaurateur and hotelier, went to school locally
- Verena Schweers (born 1989), retired footballer, played 228 games and 47 for Germany women
