= Karl Schneider (activist) =

German ophthalmologist and resistance fighter (1869-1940)

Karl Schneider (27 June 1869 – 5 November 1940) was a German ophthalmologist, pacifist and resistance fighter against Nazism.

== Life ==
Schneider was born to Catholic and liberal parents in Ettenheim. He studied medicine and specialised in ophthalmology. In 1898 he settled in Neunkirchen, Saarland and started his practice. From the end of the century he showed an interest in the burgeoning social democracy and studied the works of Marx, Engels, Bebel and Kautsky. After World War I during the November Revolution he was a member of the workers' council, which was later dissolved by French troops on 1 December 1918. In Neunkirchen he was responsible for the welfare of the sick. In 1919 he was a founding member of the Independent Social Democratic Party of Germany (USPD) in Neunkirchen. He was selected as a frontrunner at the USPD council election on 11 July 1920, and was elected to the Ottweiler district council and to the Neunkirchen town council. After the unification of parts of the USPD with the Communist Party of Germany, Schneider broke with his old party.

In the following years Schneider was independently politically active, but despite this began to campaign for pacifist organisations, including the German League for Human Rights and the German Peace Society. Schneider's left-wing attempts around Saargebiet and its impending merger with Nazi Germany failed. In 1934, he founded the "Initiative Committee for the Fight for Peace" together with Gustav Regler and Friedrich Brokmeier.

After the unification of Saarland with the German Reich in 1935, Schneider was threatened several times and his doctor's office was boycotted because of his disparaging remarks about Adolf Hitler, among other things. He once expressed his view on the "German greeting" Heil Hitler in a letter to the Leipzig "Ärztekasse" (doctors' cash collection agency) in 1934: "I am not a neurologist and thus am unable to heal your Hitler. I am an ophthalmologist and open eyes."^{note} Despite this, Schneider stayed in Saarland. He was arrested by the Gestapo on 15 April 1940, after asking in a letter whether the Gestapo tortured prisoners. He spent his "Schutzhaft" first in St. Wendel prison, but was later sent to Sachsenhausen concentration camp and then to Dachau on 3 September 1940. He died in Dachau under unresolved circumstances on 5 November 1940.

A street in Neunkirchen was named after him in 1948.

== Notes ==
1. The German quote is „Ich bin zwar kein Nervenarzt und kann deshalb euren Hitler nicht ‚heilen‘. Ich bin Augenarzt und steche den Star.“ It uses two puns on words. 'Heil Hitler' has the ambiguous meaning 'hail Hitler' or 'heal Hitler', 'jemandem den Star stechen' has the ambiguous meaning 'do a cataract surgery on someone' or 'open someone's eyes (make him recognize the truth)'.
