= CAF Reichshoffen =

French railway rolling stock manufacturer

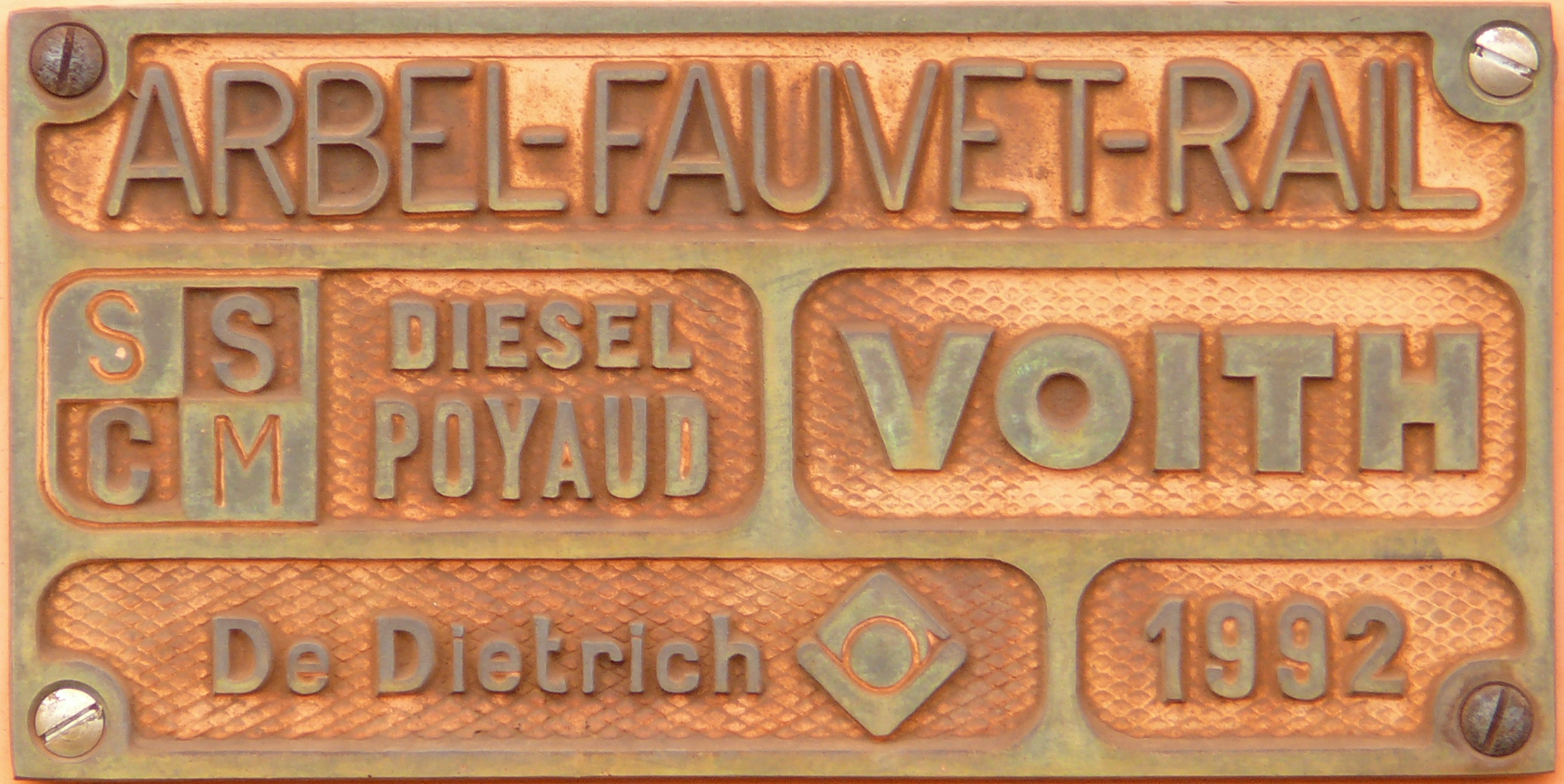

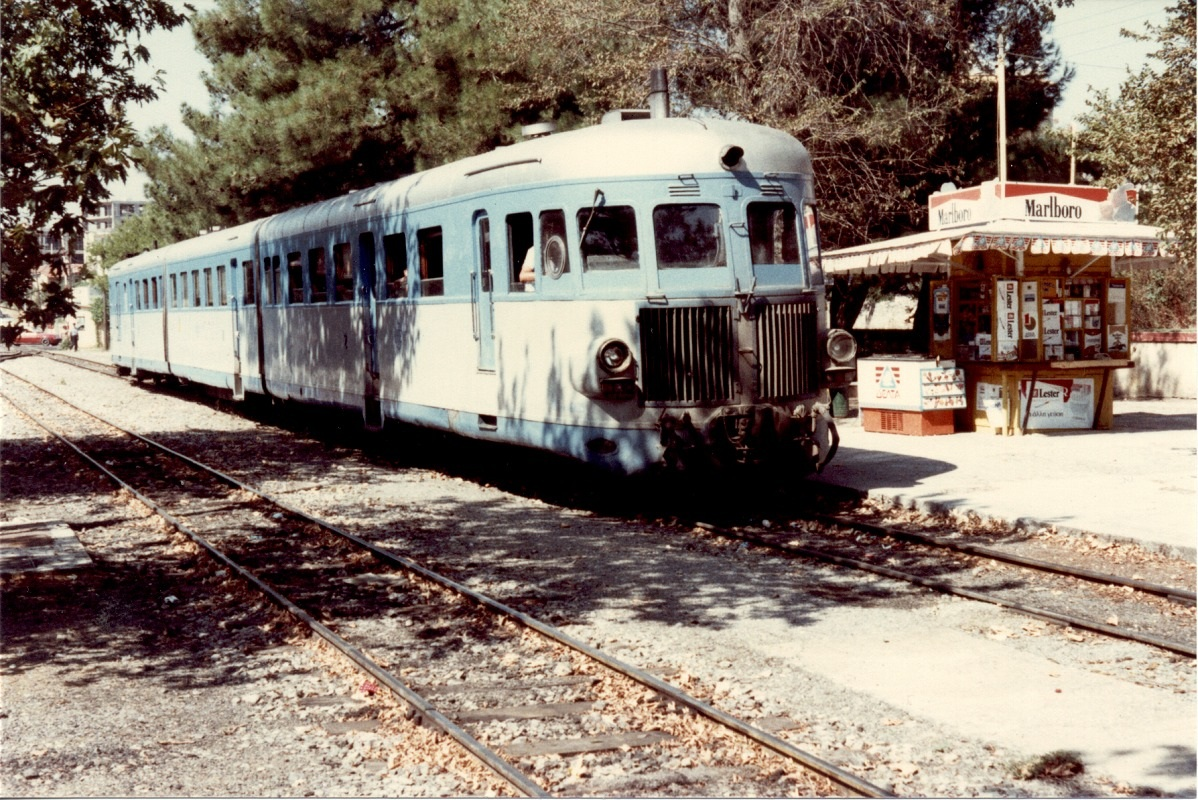
- De Dietrich train in Tripolis/Greece, 1988
- Formerly: DDF
- Company type: Société par actions simplifiée
- Industry: Rail transportation
- Founded: 1848; 178 years ago
- Founder: De Dietrich
- Headquarters: Reichshoffen, France
- Key people: Marc Ehret
- Products: Railway vehicles
- Brands: Régiolis
- Parent: CAF
- Website: www.dedietrich.com

CAF Reichshoffen, formerly De Dietrich Ferroviaire (DDF) is a French manufacturer of railway rolling stock and operated by CAF France, based in Reichshoffen, France.

== History ==
=== Origins ===
DDF constructed the carriages for the Enterprise train service jointly operated by Iarnród Éireann and Northern Ireland Railways between Dublin in the Republic of Ireland and Belfast in Northern Ireland.

DDF were part of the consortium which constructed the rolling stock for the Eurostar service from London in the United Kingdom through the Channel Tunnel to Paris, France and Brussels, Belgium.

In the 1990s, a majority stake in DDF was acquired by Alstom.

== Alstom ==
In July 2020, the French manufacturer Alstom said it would sell the Alstom DDF plant in Reichshoffen, Alsace to CAF in order to finalise the takeover of Bombardier's railway activities.
