= List of mayors of Strasbourg =

Mayor of Strasbourg
- Coat of Arms of Strasbourg

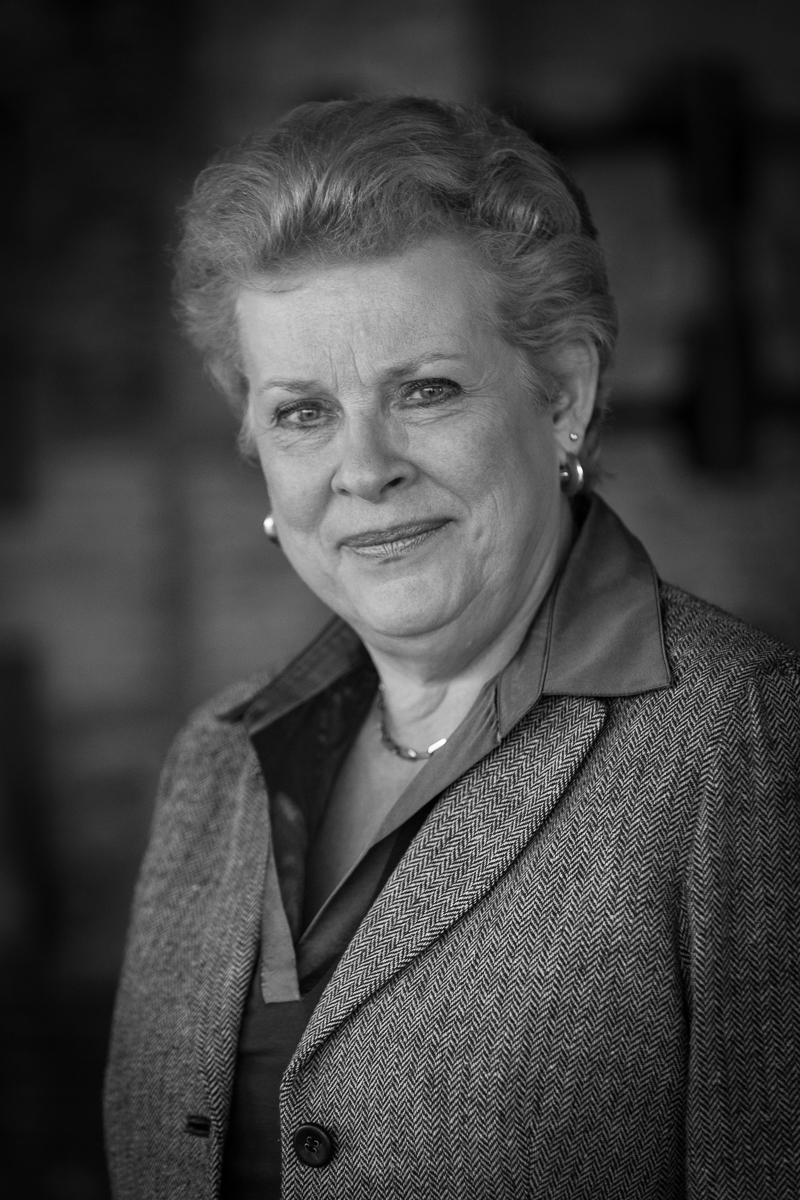
- Incumbent; Catherine Trautmann since 22 March 2026
- Seat: Hôtel de Hanau
- Formation: 1790
- First holder: Philippe Friedrich Dietrich
- Website: https://www.strasbourg.eu/

Prior to the French Revolution, Strasbourg was led by an Ammestre.

== List of Mayors of Strasbourg since the French Revolution ==
#	Name	In office		Party	Ref.
1	Baron Philippe-Frédéric de Dietrich	16 March 1790	22 August 1792		
2	Bernard-Frédéric de Turckheim	6 December 1792	18 January 1793		
3	Pierre-François Monet	21 January 1793	August 1794		
4	Jean François André	9 September 1794	January 1795		
5	Jacques Etienne de Livio	31 March 1800	6 December 1800		
6	Jean-Frédéric Hermann (born 1743; died 1820)	6 December 1800	22 October 1806		
7	Louis-François de Wangen de Geroldseck	14 February 1806	8 September 1810		
8	Jacques-Frédéric Brackenhoffer	8 September 1810	19 September 1815		
-	Ensfelder (1st deputy/interim)	20 September 1815	25 October 1815		
9	François Xavier Antoine de Kentzinger	26 October 1815	30 August 1830		
10	Jean-Frédéric de Turckheim	1830	1835		
11	Antoine François Thomas Lacombe	15 July 1835	1837		
12	Georges Schützenberger	1837	1848		
13	Guillaume Lauth	2 March 1848	2 May 1848		
14	Édouard Kratz	2 May 1848	24 March 1851		
15	Désiré François Alexandre Chastelain	24 March 1851	23 October 1852		
16	Charles Louis Coulaux	1852	1864		
17	Théodore Humann	1864	1870		
18	Émile Kuss	11 September 1870	1 March 1871		
-	Jules Klein (as Deputy Mayor)	1 March 1871	8 October 1871		
19	Ernest Lauth	9 October 1871	7 April 1873		
20	Otto Back	12 April 1873	14 April 1880		
21	Georges Stempel	24 April 1880	July 1886		
22	Otto Back	23 July 1886	29 October 1906		
23	Rudolf Schwander	October 1906	9 November 1918		
24	Frédéric Charles Philippe Pfersdorff	January 1919	April 1919		
25	Jacques Peirotes	1919	1929	SFIO	
26	Charles Hueber	1929	1935	PCF	
27	Charles Frey	1935	1940	Radical-Socialist	
28	Theodor Ellgering	28 June 1940	5 March 1941		
29	Robert Ernst	5 March 1941	23 November 1944	SS officer; installed by Nazi Germany	
30	Charles Frey	1945	14 October 1955	RPF	
31	Charles Émile Altorffer	29 October 1955	14 March 1959	RPF	
32	Pierre Pflimlin	14 March 1959	6 March 1983	MRP then CDP then UDF	
33	Marcel Rudloff	1983	1989	UDF	
34	Catherine Trautmann	24 March 1989	25 June 1997	PS	
35	Roland Ries	27 June 1997	25 June 2000	PS	
36	Catherine Trautmann	25 June 2000	19 March 2001	PS	
37	Fabienne Keller	25 March 2001	22 March 2008	UDF then UMP	
38	Roland Ries	22 March 2008	4 July 2020	PS	
39	Jeanne Barseghian	4 July 2020	22 March 2026	EELV	
40	Catherine Trautmann	22 March 2026	Incumbent	PS	
