= Johann von Türckheim =

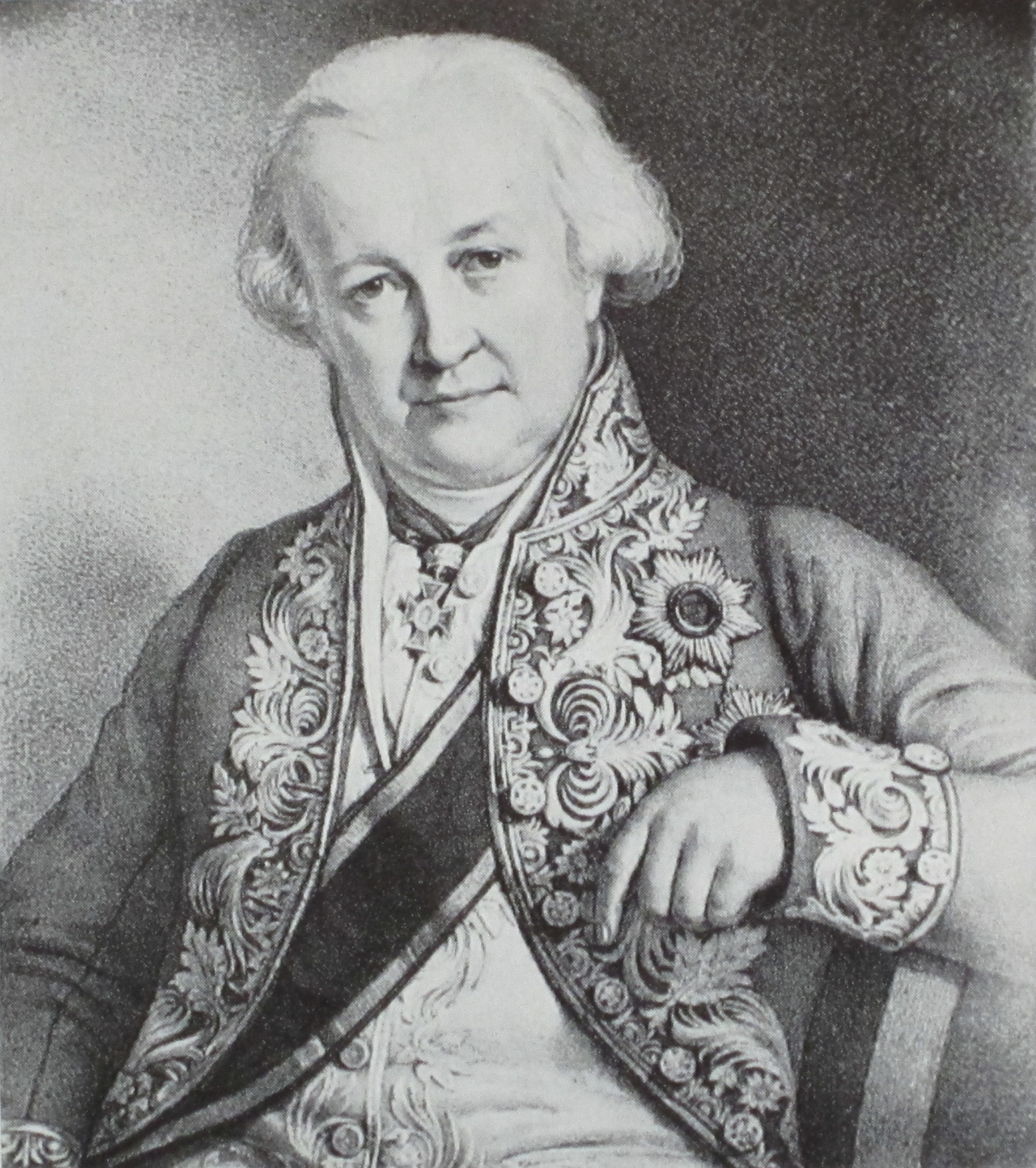

National Constituent Assembly
- In office 8 April 1789 – 24 November 1789
- Parliamentary group: Third Estate
- Constituency: Strasbourg

Personal details
- Born: 10 November 1749 Strasbourg
- Died: 28 January 1824 (aged 74) Altorf (Ettenheim)
- Spouse: Dorothea von Seufferheld (1759–1829)
- Relations: Bernard-Frédéric de Turckheim (brother)
- Children: 8 children, including: Johann von Türckheim (1778–1847); Ferdinand August Josef Freiherr von Türckheim (1789–1848)
- Parents: Jean de Turckheim (1707–1793) (father); Maria Magdalene, née Henneberg (1720–1793) (mother)
- Occupation: Politician, diplomat

Johann von Türckheim (French: Jean de Turckheim) (10 November 1749 – 28 January 1824) was a French politician and a German diplomat.

== Family ==
Jean de Turckheim was the oldest son of Baron Jean de Turckheim (1707–1793) and a brother of Bernard-Frédéric de Turckheim. His nephew, Jean-Frédéric de Turckheim, was the eighth mayor of Strasbourg.

== Life ==
He was elected as a deputy of Strasbourg to the Estates-General in 1789. Initially supportive of the revolution, he became disenchanted with its goals after the violence of July and August 1790 and became convinced that the unrest was part of a broader plan to overthrow the king and establish a radical republic. After a short term as mayor of Strasbourg, he left France, and offered his services to the Duke of Hesse, whom he served for several years, in particular as envoy to Rome. He died in Altorf (Ettenheim), in the Grand Duchy of Baden in 1824.

== Works ==
- De Jure legislatorio Merovaeorum et Carolingorum Galliae regum circa sacra. 1771, 1772
- History of the House of Hesse.

== See also ==
- List of members of the National Constituent Assembly of 1789
