= Bernard-Frédéric de Turckheim =

French politician

Jean de Turckheim
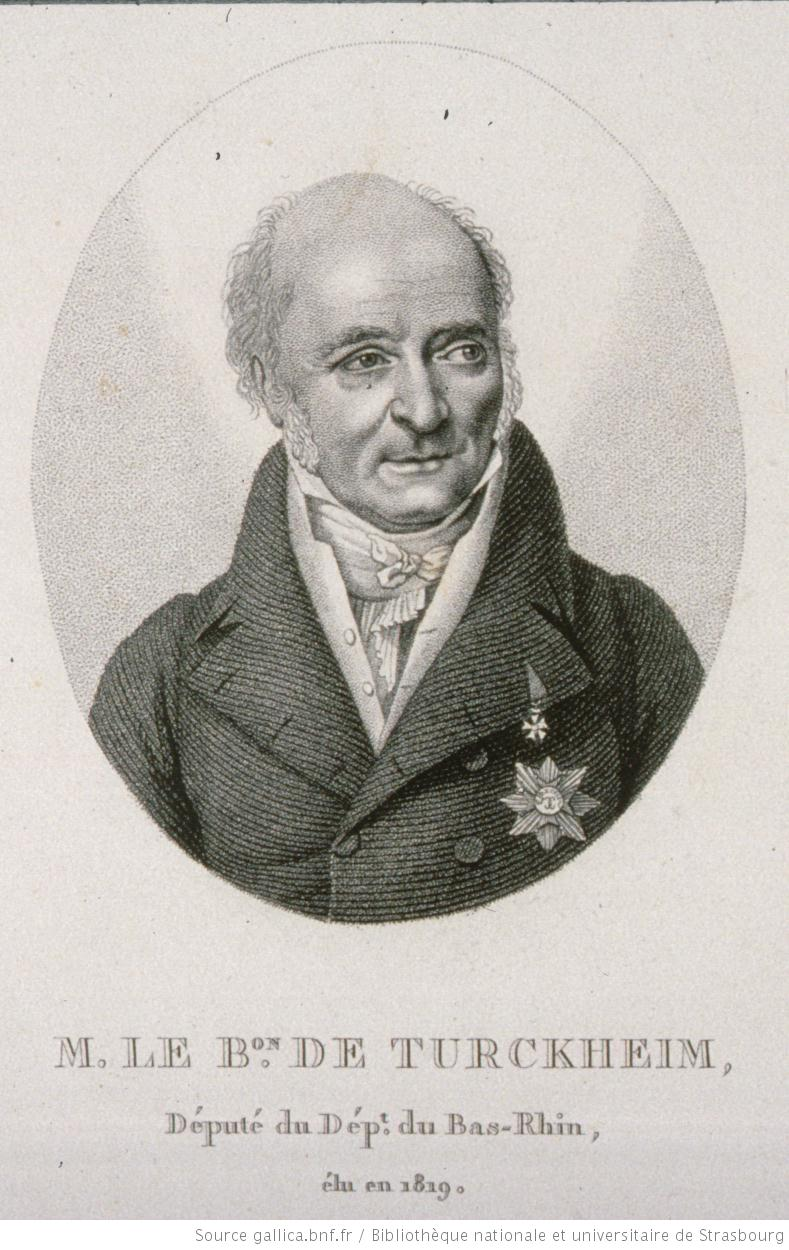

Mayor of Strasbourg
- In office 1792–1793
- Preceded by: Philippe Friedrich Dietrich
- Succeeded by: Pierre Monet

Personal details
- Born: 3 November 1752 Strasbourg
- Died: 10 July 1831 (aged 78) Strasbourg
- Spouse: Lili Schönemann
- Relations: Johann von Türckheim (brother)
- Children: Elisabeth (1779-1865); Frédéric (1780-1850); Charles (1783-1862); Guillaume (1785-1831); Henri (1789-1849)
- Parents: Jean de Turckheim (1707–1793) (father); Maria Magdalene, née Henneberg (1720–1793) (mother)
- Occupation: Politician

Bernard-Frédéric de Turckheim (3 November 1752 – 10 July 1831) was a French politician.

Preceded by Philippe Friedrich Dietrich	Mayor of Strasbourg; 1792–1793	Succeeded by Pierre Monet
