= Église Saint-Michel de Reichshoffen =

Church in Reichshoffen, France

Coordinates: 48°55′55″N 7°39′52″E

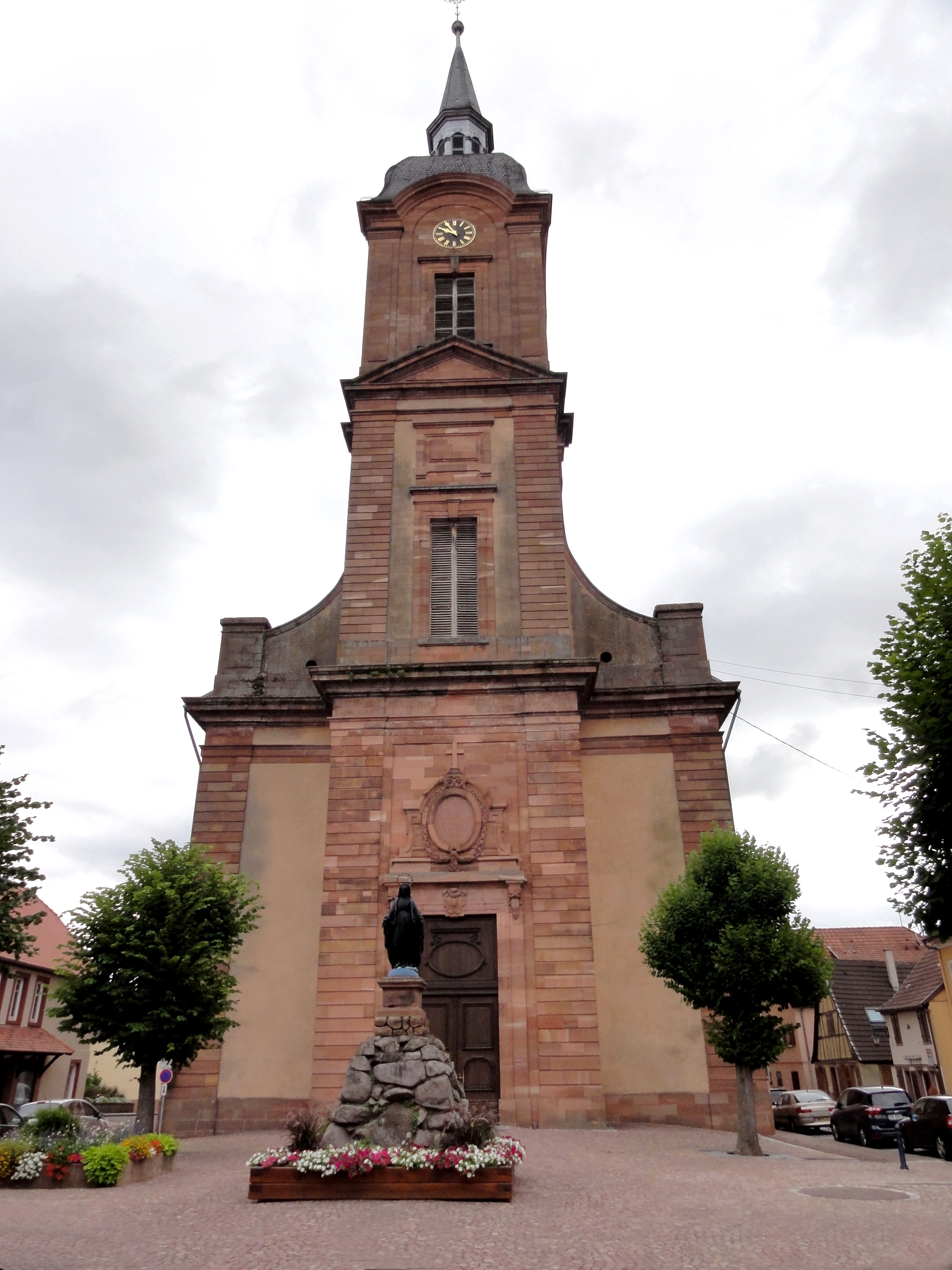
Église Saint-Michel de Reichshoffen

Église Saint-Michel de Reichshoffen is a church in Reichshoffen, Bas-Rhin, Alsace, France. Built in 1772, it became a registered Monument historique in 1921.
