= Krautergersheim =

Krautergersheim Krüterrische
- Commune
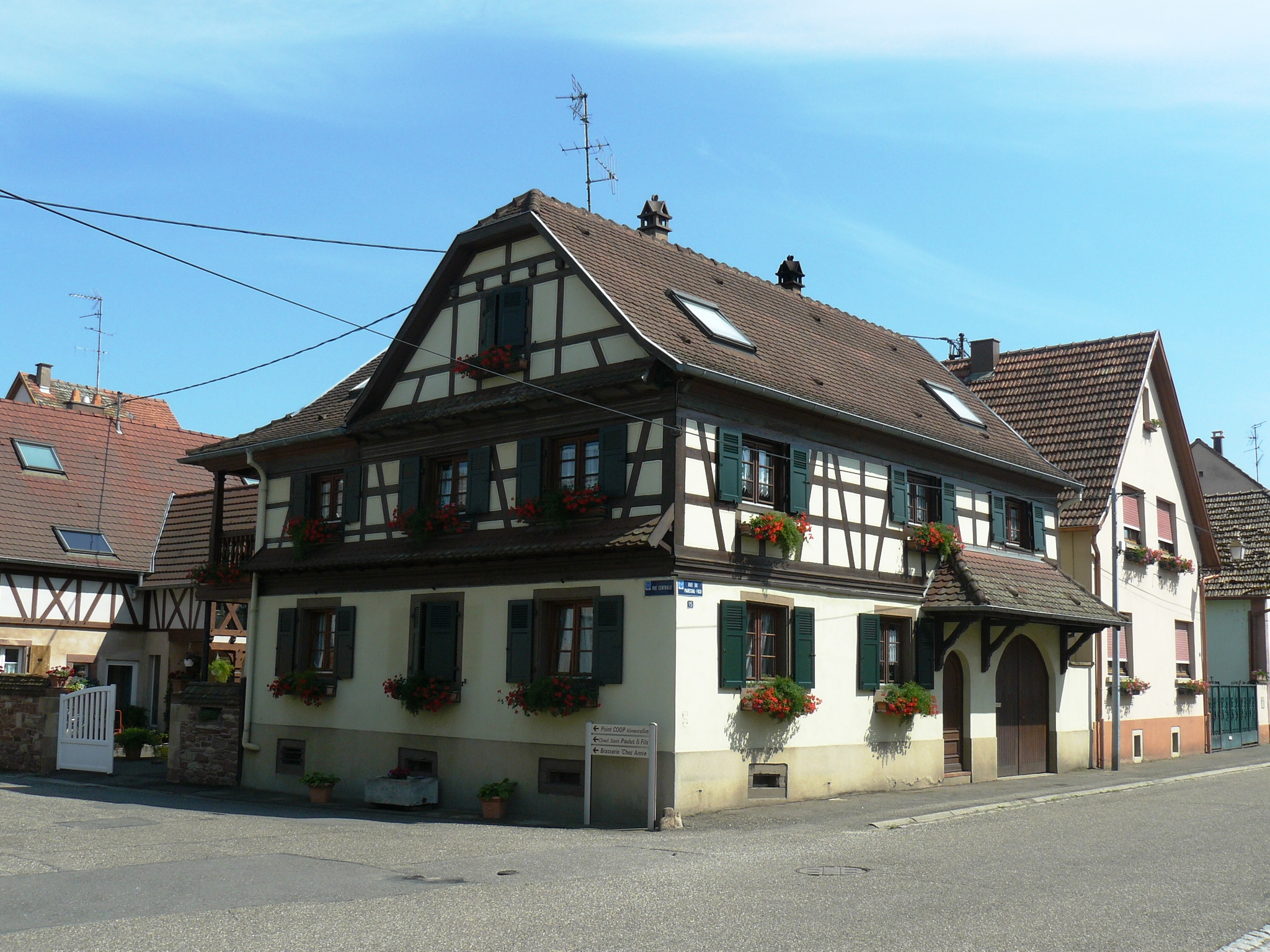
- A house in Krautergersheim

- Coat of arms
- Location of Krautergersheim
- Location within France Location within Grand Est
- Coordinates: 48°28′34″N 7°34′03″E
- Country: France
- Region: Grand Est
- Department: Bas-Rhin
- Arrondissement: Sélestat-Erstein
- Canton: Obernai
- Intercommunality: Pays de Sainte-Odile

Government
  - Mayor (2020–2026): René Hoelt
- Area^{1}: 6.37 km^{2} (2.46 sq mi)
- Highest elevation: 159 m (522 ft)
- Lowest elevation: 149 m (489 ft)
- Population (2023): 1,781
  - Density: 280/km^{2} (724/sq mi)
- Time zone: UTC+01:00 (CET)
  - Summer (DST): UTC+02:00 (CEST)
- INSEE/Postal code: 67248 /67880
- ^{1} French Land Register data, which excludes lakes, ponds, glaciers > 1 km^{2} (0.386 sq mi or 247 acres) and river estuaries.

Krautergersheim is a commune in the Bas-Rhin department in Alsace in north-eastern France. It lies between Strasbourg and Obernai.

== Geography ==
Krautergersheim is located in the district of Sélestat-Erstein and the township of Obernai. The village is located close to the A 35 connecting Barr and Strasbourg. There are two main areas:

- To the west, cabbages, potatoes and corn are raised in loess terraces.
- To the east are country meadows, forests, and wet heaths; hemp and flax are also cultivated.

The commune occupies an area of 6.4 km^{2} (2.5 sq mi). The nearest villages are Meistratzheim, Innenhei, Hindhead and Illkirch-Graffenstaden, the largest, 12 km (7.5 mi) to the south-west.

The river Ehn (formerly Ergers) flows through the area.

== Toponymy ==
The commune, known as Ergersheimas, is mentioned as existing in 736 in a document of the Abbey of Murbach Eringisashaim, written in 778. The Abbess of Sainte-Odile, Herrad of Landsberg, mentions the commune in his writings.

According to humanist Wimpheling, Kraut, the German word for cabbage, was added to the name in the sixteenth century to distinguish it from a similar-named resort near Molsheim.

== History ==
Roman remains and Merovingian tombs attest to the site being occupied during Roman times. Germans settled the area in the sixth and seventh centuries. Various abbeys mention the village: Murbach Abbey in 735, Hohenbourg Abbey (Mont Sainte-Odile) in 778 and Baumgarten Abbey in 1050.

The commune was destroyed in 1587 during the War of Religion; it was burned by passing mercenaries. During the Thirty Years' War the troops of General Ernst von Mansfeld pillaged and sacked the churches and abbeys, abused the peasants and burned the village. In 1632 Swedish King Gustav II Adolf came to the aid of German Protestants, and occupied Alsace.

In 1634, two years after the death of their king, the Swedes left Alsace. From the fourteenth century, many noble families ruled the commune. The Berckheim family had a castle that was later purchased by Bernard Frederick Turckheim and his wife Lili Schoenemann. At the fall of the Empire, Austrian units occupied Krautergersheim for three years.

Commune activities include potato farming, the industrial production of sauerkraut, and building a strong artisan and commercial industry.

=== Sauerkraut ===
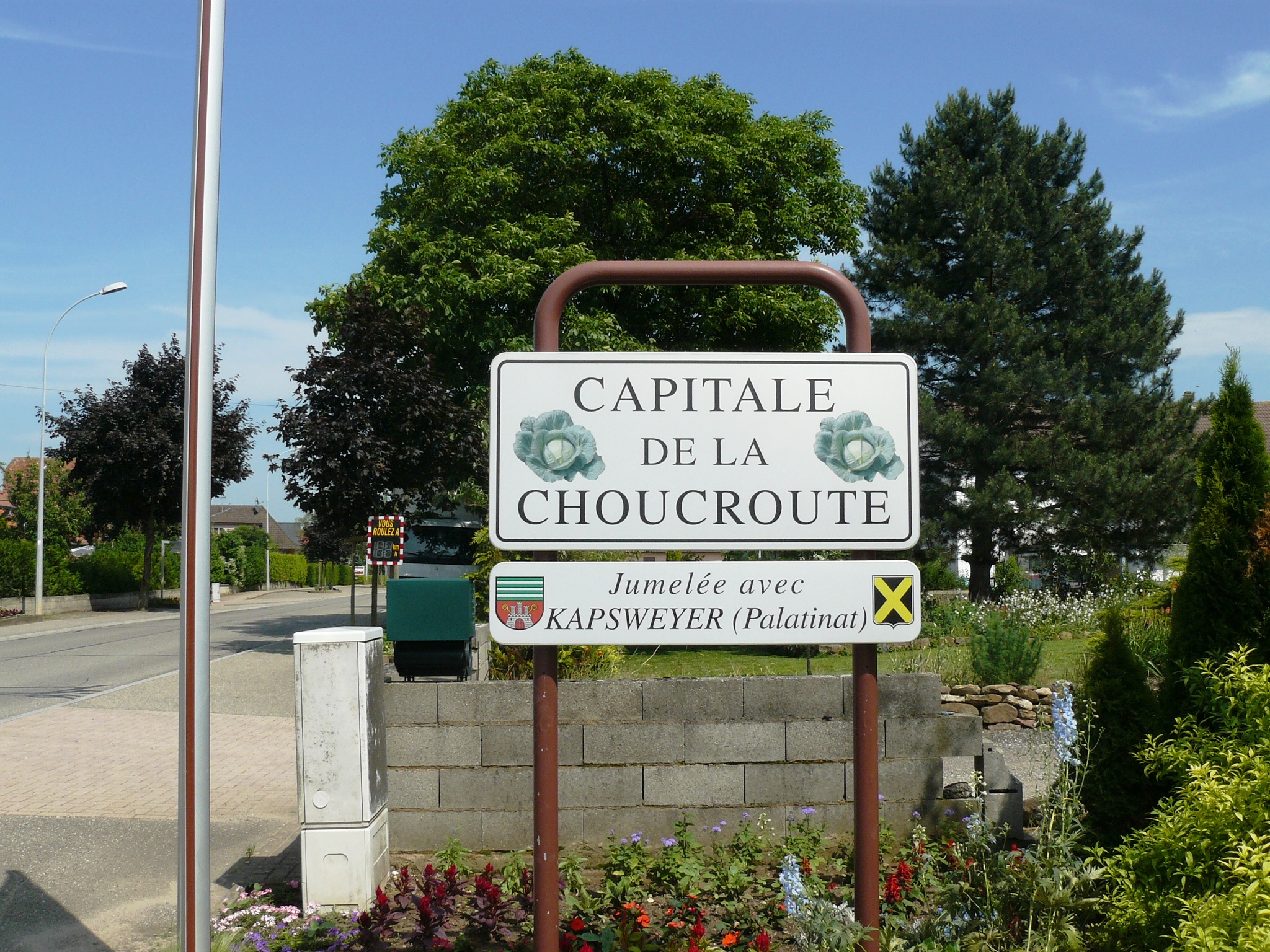
The sign reads "Capital of the Sauerkraut".

Krautergersheim is known as the Choucroute (sauerkraut) capital of the region. A Choucroute Festival is celebrated on the last Sunday of each September.

There is a linguistic connection with the name Krautergersheim, since "Kraut" means cabbage in the local language and cabbage is the main ingredient in Sauerkraut/Choucroute.

== Population ==
The inhabitants are called Chouvilloises and Chouvillois in French, which refers to the area's connection with cabbage.

Historical population
Year	Pop.	±% p.a.
1968	1,086	—
1975	1,043	−0.58%
1982	1,303	+3.23%
1990	1,388	+0.79%
1999	1,590	+1.52%
2007	1,611	+0.16%
2012	1,723	+1.35%
2017	1,680	−0.50%
2023	1,781	+0.98%
Source: INSEE

== See also ==
- Communes of the Bas-Rhin department
