= BDR Thermea =

Dutch water and space heating equipment company

BDR Thermea Group
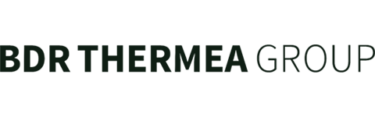
- Type: Private
- Industry: Heating, Ventilation and Air Conditioning
- Predecessor: Baxi Group; De Dietrich Remeha
- Founded: November 2, 2009; 16 years ago
- Headquarters: Apeldoorn, Netherlands
- Area served: Worldwide
- Key people: Tjarko Bouman (CEO); Ronald Eikelenboom (CFO); Luigi La Morgia (CTOO); Aliette van der Wal (CCO)
- Brands: Baxi; Baymak; Brötje; Chappée; De Dietrich; Megaflo; Remeha; SenerTec
- Revenue: €2 billion (2020)
- Number of employees: 7,100
- Website: https://www.bdrthermeagroup.com/

The BDR Thermea Group is a European manufacturer and distributor of domestic and commercial water and space heating systems. Its brands include Baxi, De Dietrich Remeha, Brötje, Chappée and Baymak.

BDR Thermea Group operates in more than 100 countries worldwide, and is a leading manufacturer and distributor in Europe, Turkey, Russia and China. Its products are manufactured in 11 different locations in eight countries.

Currently employing 6,100 people worldwide, BDR Thermea Group had a turnover of around €1.8 billion in 2020, making it a leading manufacturer of heating appliances. BDR Thermea Group is a global company with trade brands that vary per market. Its focus is on the needs of installers and end-users, which differ by market sector and country.

== History ==
BDR Thermea Group was formed from the mergers of several companies. In 2004, Remeha merged with De Dietrich Thermique, which included the Chappée brand. In 2009, De Dietrich Remeha Group and the Baxi Group, which included the German brand Brötje, merged to become BDR Thermea Group.

BDR Thermea Group acquired Baymak in Turkey in 2013.

In 2015, BDR Thermea Group acquired its North American subsidiary, ECR International. In 2021, it divested from ECR International.

In 2021, the company acquired Hitecsa in Spain.

In 2026 BDR Thermea has completed the full acquisition of the Italian company G.I. Holding. This brings the brands CLINT, KTK, NOVAIR, and MONTAIR into the HVAC manufacturer's portfolio. According to the press release, this move accelerates the delivery of integrated, low-carbon HVAC solutions for commercial and industrial buildings.

== Hydrogen boilers ==
BDR Thermea Group has been developing hydrogen boilers for use in heating technology as a way to help decarbonise heating. In 2019, the company was the first to apply a high-efficiency hydrogen-powered boiler in a real-life setting in Rozenburg, the Netherlands, together with gas grid provider Stedin, the municipality of Rotterdam, and the housing association Ressort Wonen.

In 2022 BDR Theremea Group delivered boilers for the 'Hydrogen 2 Lochem' (H2L) project. The Lochem hydrogen project (H2L) was a pioneering three-year pilot launched in late 2022 in the Berkeloord district of Lochem. It supplied 100% pure hydrogen via the existing gas grid to heat 12 heritage homes using special hydrogen central heating boilers. The successful demonstration project concluded at the end of 2025.

== Initiatives ==
In the UK, BDR Thermea Group participates in the Hy4Heat programme, which supports the replacement of natural gas with hydrogen to heat homes and businesses. The company also participates in hydrogen studies and demonstrations in France and Germany.

In 2020, BDR Thermea Group joined the European Clean Hydrogen Alliance. The Alliance is a member of the European Green Deal and aims to make Europe a global competitor in the clean hydrogen market.
