= De Dietrich Remeha =

Dutch heating company

Remeha
- Industry: Heating
- Founded: July 2004
- Defunct: July 2009
- Successor: BDR Thermea
- Headquarters: Apeldoorn, Netherlands
- Area served: Worldwide
- Products: Boilers
- Revenue: € 600 million
- Number of employees: 2300
- Divisions: De Dietrich Thermique; Remeha; Oertli; Sofath
- Subsidiaries: Roca Heating
- Website: dedietrichremeha.com

De Dietrich Remeha is one of Europe's biggest manufacturers and distributors of domestic and commercial water and space heating systems. Headquartered in Apeldoorn in the Netherlands, it was founded in July 2004 after a merger between the Dutch firm Remeha, and the French firm De Dietrich Thermique. In July 2009, the heavily laden with debt British Baxi group agreed to merge with De Dietrich Remeha, creating the BDR Thermea Group.

== Brands ==
- De Dietrich Thermique: founded in 1684, based in Mertzwiller, France, it is France's largest manufacturer of heating systems. De Dietrich products are distributed and marketed in more than 60 countries.
- Remeha: founded in 1935, Remeha is The Netherlands's largest manufacturer of heating products, with European scale products in condensing technology. Remeha has its own subsidiaries in the United Kingdom and Germany.
- Oertli: founded in 1929 in Switzerland, the company is now headquartered in Thann, Haut-Rhin, France. The company produces comfort solutions such as heating boilers, burners, hot water tanks and solar systems. Oertli focuses on clean combustion (low NO_{x} and CO_{2} emissions), energy saving technology and a high level of product usability
- Sofath: founded in the 1970s, the DFM Group based in Portes-les-Valence, France trades under its major brand of Sofath. A pioneer of geothermal heat pumps in France, the group is now the largest manufacturer of heat pumps in Europe. The DFM group turns over of €32 million and employs 110 people.

== See also ==
- Baxi
- Worcester Bosch Group
