= Claude Joseph Rouget de Lisle =

French writer and composer (1760–1836)

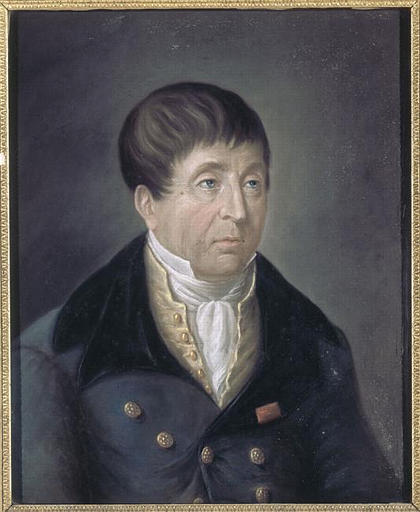
- Rouget de Lisle in 1835
- Born: 10 May 1760; Lons-le-Saunier, France
- Died: 26 June 1836 (aged 76) Choisy-le-Roi, Seine-et-Oise, France
- Allegiance: France
- Branch: French Army
- Service years: 1784–1793
- Rank: Captain
- Awards: Chevalier. Legion of Honour (1831)
- Other work: "La Marseillaise"

Claude Joseph Rouget de Lisle (Note: Sometimes spelled de l'Isle or de Lile.) (French: [klod ʒozɛf ʁuʒɛ d(ə) lil]; 10 May 1760 – 26 June 1836) was a French army officer of the French Revolutionary Wars. Lisle is known for writing La Marseillaise and it became the French national anthem.

== Early life ==
Rouget de Lisle was born at Lons-le-Saunier, reputedly on a market day. His parents lived in the neighbouring village of Montaigu. A plaque was placed at the precise spot of his birth and a statue erected in the town's center in 1882. He was the eldest son of Claude Ignace Rouget (5 April 1735 – 6 August 1792) at Orgelet and Jeanne Madeleine Gaillande (2 July 1734 – 20 March 1811).

In 1784, he was initiated into "Les Frères discrets", a masonic lodge in Charleville, just after being promoted officer.

== Career ==
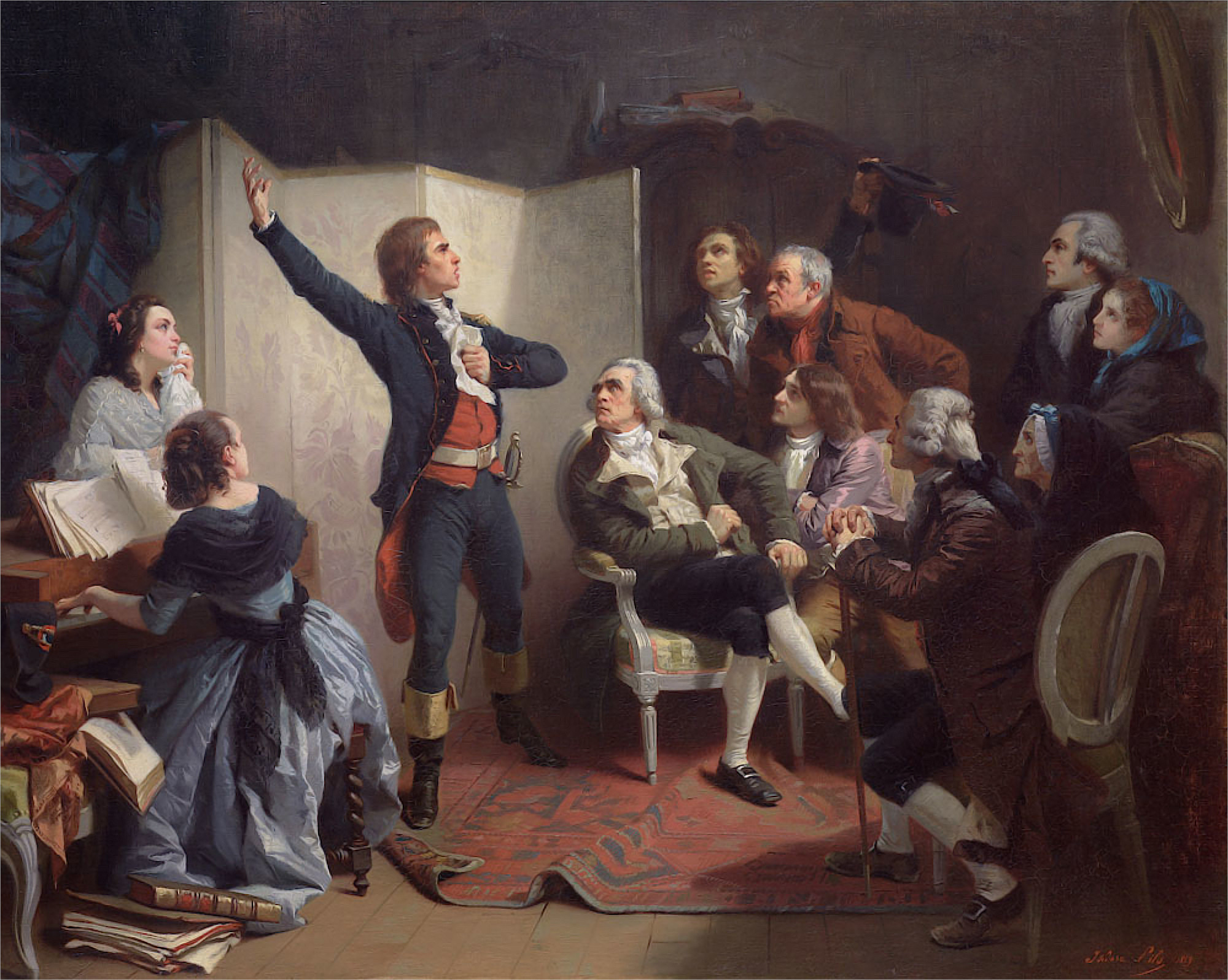
Rouget de Lisle sings la Marseillaise for the first time, by Isidore Pils

He enlisted into the army as an engineer and attained the rank of captain. A royalist like his father, he refused to take the oath of allegiance to the new constitution. Rouget de Lisle was cashiered and thrown into prison in 1793, narrowly escaping the guillotine. He was freed during the Thermidorian Reaction and retired to Montaigu.

=== La Marseillaise ===
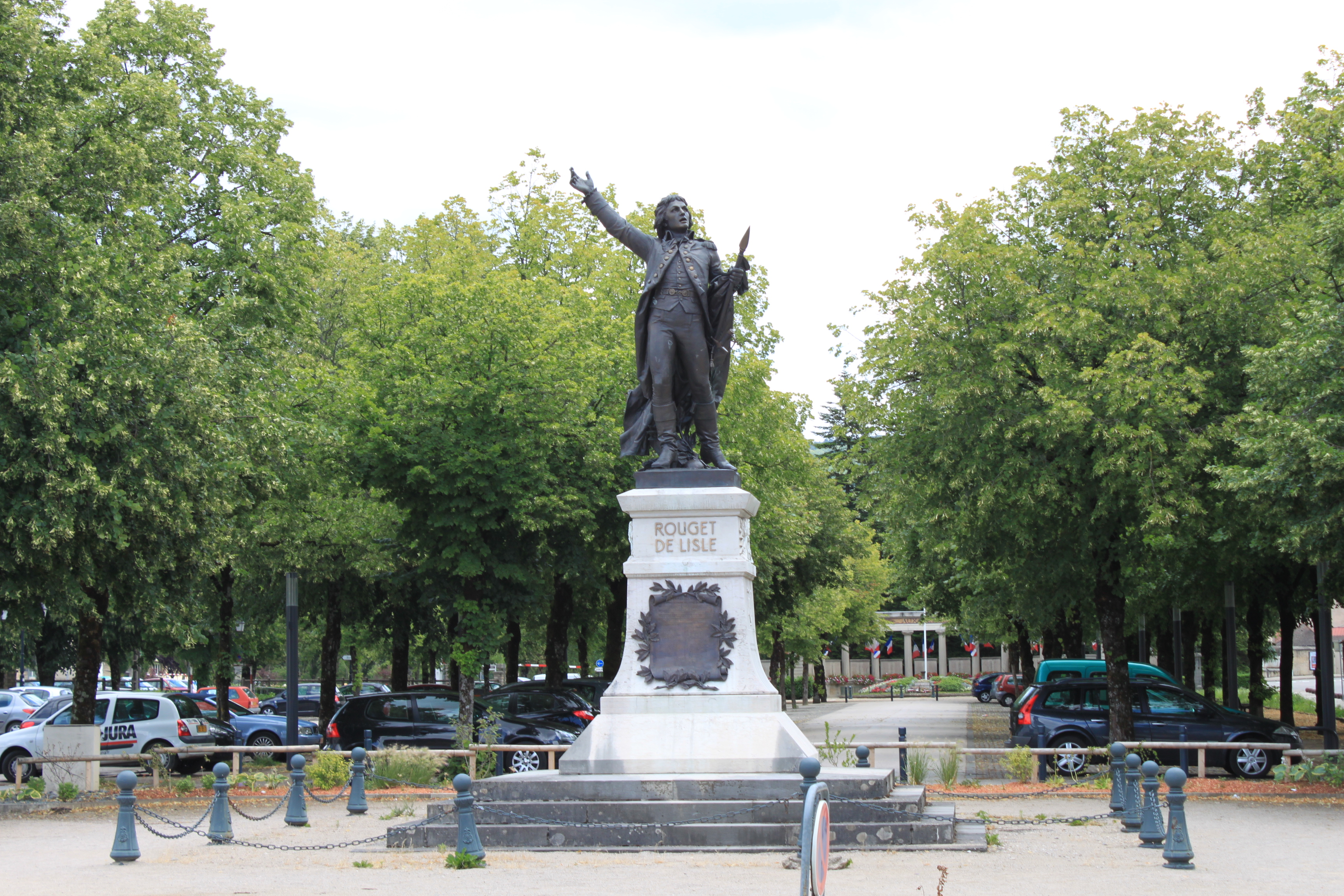
Statue of Rouget de Lisle in Lons-le-Saunier, France.

The song that has immortalized him, "La Marseillaise", was composed at Strasbourg, where Rouget de Lisle was garrisoned in April 1792. However, another composition with the same tune was composed 11 years before by the Italian composer Giovan Battista Viotti at the court of Marie Antoinette. France had just declared war on Austria, and the mayor of Strasbourg and worshipful master of the local masonic lodge, baron Philippe-Frédéric de Dietrich, held a dinner for the officers of the garrison, at which he lamented that France had no national anthem. Rouget de Lisle returned to his quarters and wrote the words in a fit of patriotic excitement. The piece was at first called Chant de guerre pour l'armée du Rhin ("War Song for the Army of the Rhine") and only received its name of Marseillaise from its adoption by the Provençal volunteers whom Barbaroux introduced into Paris and who were prominent in the storming of the Tuileries Palace on 10 August 1792.

After the war, Rouget de Lisle wrote a few other songs of the same kind as the "Marseillaise", and in 1825 he published Chants français (French Songs) in which he set to music fifty poems by various authors. His Essais en vers et en prose (Essays in Verse and Prose, 1797) contains the Marseillaise; a prose tale Adelaide et Monville of the sentimental kind; and some occasional poems. He returned to public life after the July Revolution and was awarded the Legion of Honour by Louis Philippe I.

== Death ==
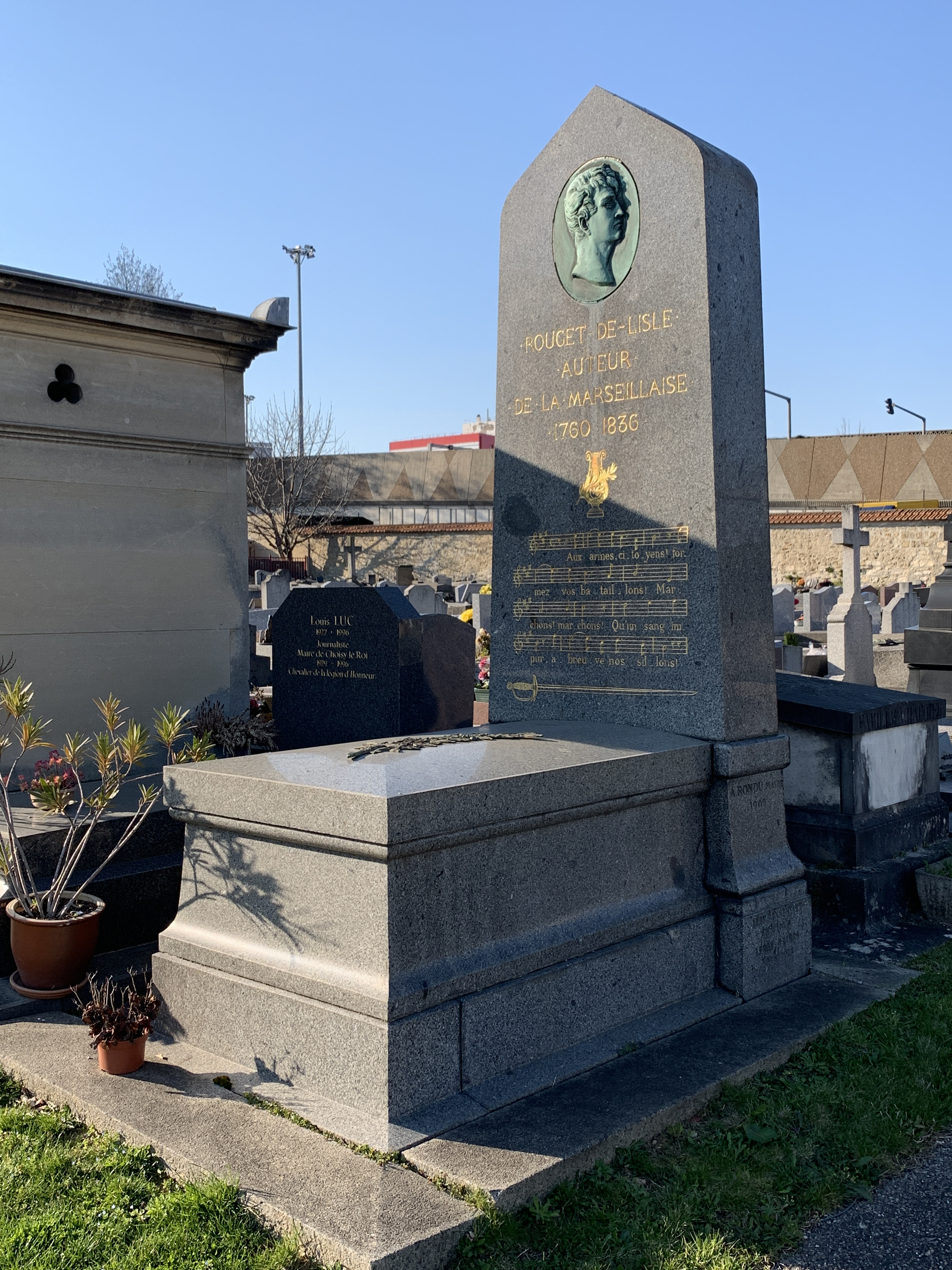
Rouget de Lisle's cenotaph in Choisy-le-Roi, France.

Rouget de Lisle died in poverty in Choisy-le-Roi, Val de Marne. His mortal remains were transferred from Choisy-le-Roi cemetery to the Invalides on 14 July 1915, during World War I.
