= Philippe Friedrich Dietrich =

French scholar and politician

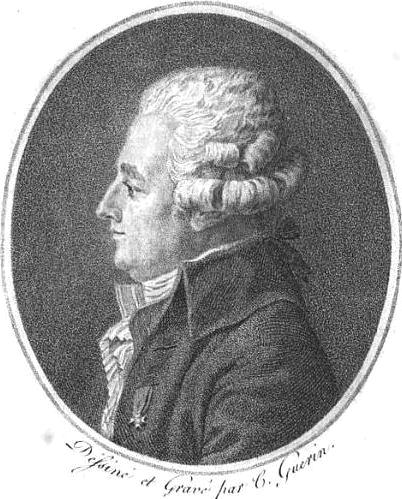

Mayor of Strasbourg
- In office March 1790 – August 1792
- Preceded by: None
- Succeeded by: Bernard-Frédéric de Turckheim (1792–1793)

Personal details
- Born: 14 November 1748 Strasbourg, Kingdom of France
- Died: 29 December 1793 (aged 45) Paris, French Republic
- Cause of death: Executed by guillotine
- Party: Girondin
- Spouse: Louise Sybille Ochs
- Occupation: Scientist, politician

Baron Philippe Friedrich Dietrich (German: Philipp Friedrich Freiherr von Dietrich; 14 November 1748 – 29 December 1793) was a French scholar and politician. He was most well known as the first mayor of Strasbourg who encouraged Rouget de l'Isle to write various patriotic songs, including the song which became known as "La Marseillaise", first performed in his living room; he was also known as a scientist, the author of a survey of mines & blast furnaces in France, a distinguished geologist and chemist, and a member of the Academy of Sciences. As mayor of Strasbourg, he accelerated revolutionary reforms throughout the region.

== Family and early career ==
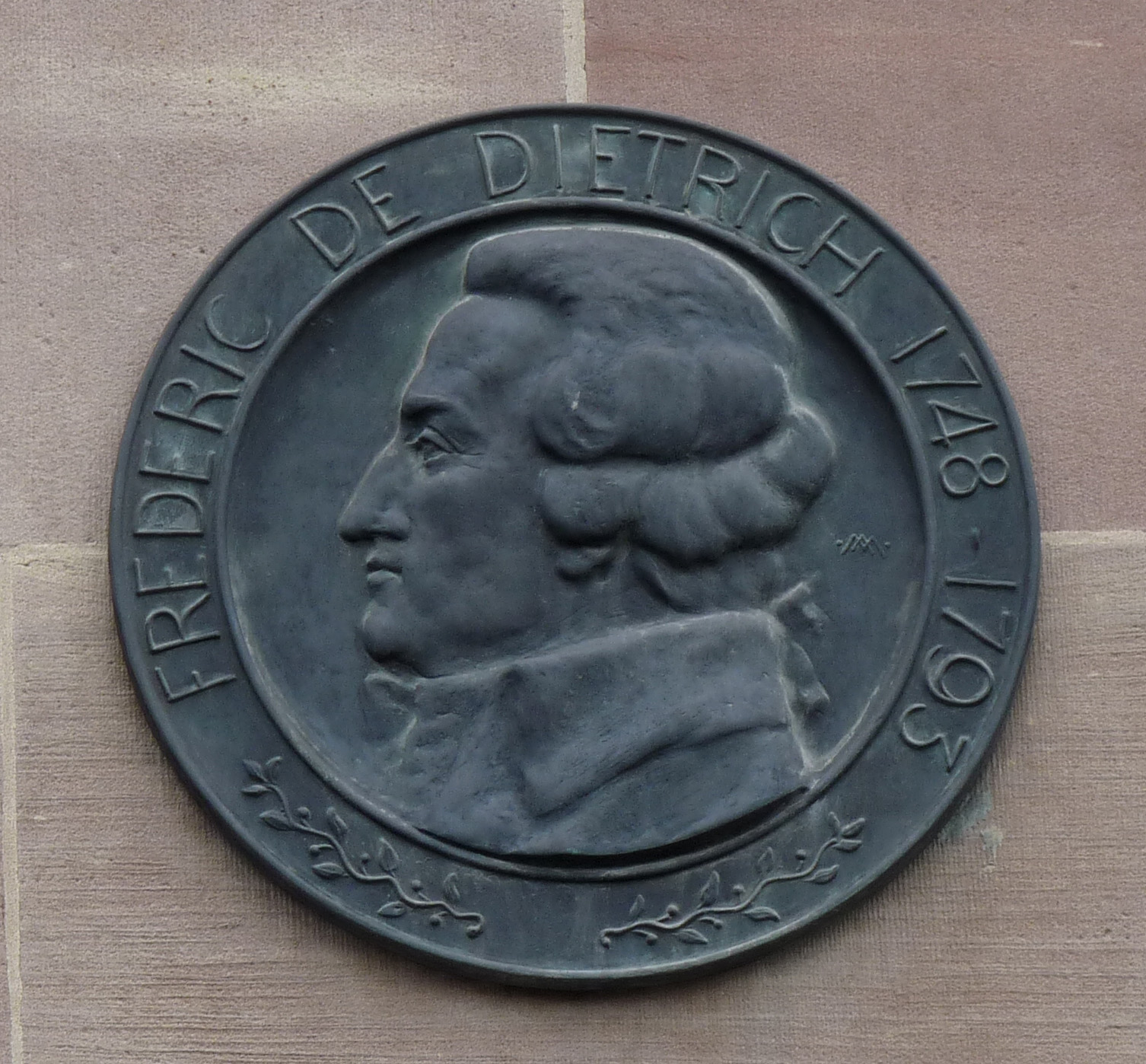
Dietrich by Alfred Marzolff, plaque on Place Broglie

Dietrich came from an old Protestant family of bankers and foundry owners in Niederbronn, in the Lower Rhine, and Reichshofen. The family was established in Strasbourg, with the 1549 birth of Dominique Didier, who was also known in this bi-lingual territory as Dominick Dietrich. His father, Jean Dietrich (1719–1795, comte Ban de la Roche), was the son of Johann von Dietrich, a foundry owner in Reichshofen. His mother, Amélie Hermanny (Anne-Dorothee Hermanni) (1729–1766), was the daughter of a prominent banker. He had one brother, Jean (1746–1805), who married Louise-Sophie de Glaubitz (1751–1806), and established the family's ironworks in Saint Domingue. His own son, Jean-Albert Dietrich (1773–1806), was counselor of Bas-Rhin; he married Amélie de Berckheim (1776–1855). His granddaughter married the nephew of his successor as mayor of Strasbourg, William Turckheim (1785–1831), colonel of cavalry in the French army.

Dietrich attended the Protestant gymnasium in Strasbourg and from 1772 continued his study through European travel. An encyclopaedist, and a Freemason, he embraced the Enlightenment ideals the development ideas of science and technology, gender differences in men without religion or origin, international understanding and peace among peoples.

He married Louise Sybille Ochs, sister of Peter Ochs, who became mayor of Basel and a militant supporter of the French-styled revolution in Switzerland in 1798–99.

He received the position of secretary and charge-de-affaires of Swiss and Grisons, bought by his father in 1771. This charge required him to reside in Paris half his time. In 1775, he demonstrated the volcanic origins of the Kaiserstuhl, near Freiburg im Breisgau, and was admitted to the Academy of Sciences in 1786. In 1777 he participated in experiments conducted by Alessandro Volta in Strasbourg, on marsh gas, and brought him membership into the Academy of Sciences, aided by Antoine Lavoisier. They wrote joint articles on the subject.

On 11 January 1785, he was appointed commissioner of the king's factories, foundries and forests of the kingdom, a position he shared with Barthélemy Faujas de Saint-Fond. The creation of this function was necessitated by the depletion of forests and the need to replace wood with coal and coke. In the course of his duties, he compiled the Description of ore bodies and mouths to fire the kingdom in three volumes: the Pyrenees (1786), Upper and Lower Alsace (1788) and the southern Lorraine (written in 1788 but published in 1799).

== Activities during the Revolution ==
Dietrich was mayor of Strasbourg from March 1790 to August 1792. At his home during a dinner in honor of the officers of the garrison of Strasbourg he asked the Captain Claude Joseph Rouget de Lisle, stationed in his city, to write the "Song for the Army of the Rhine", the future "La Marseillaise". Rouget de l'Isle composed the song in the night of 24–25 April 1792. According to sources, Dietrich would have sung the song himself, accompanied on the piano by his wife, for he was very good musician. Baron Dietrich knew the Captain Rouget de l'Isle to be like him, a Freemason and attend the same Masonic lodge of Strasbourg.

Summoned before the bar of the Convention, which accused him of supporting the refractory priests and especially to have protested against the insurgency days of 20 June–10 August 1792, Dietrich took refuge first in Basel, in the home of his brother-in-law, Peter Ochs, and was taken prisoner. The Jacobins sent him to the court of Besançon on 7 March 1793. He was then transported to Paris, where Maximilien Robespierre considered a "dangerous man", "one of the greatest conspirators of the Republic." Putting pressure on the court, Robespierre declared to the Jacobins: "National justice requires that he [Dietrich] be punished, and the interest of the people demand it to be [done] quickly". Consequently, the Revolutionary Court sentenced him to death. He was guillotined on 29 December 1793.

On 23 August 1795, the National Convention rehabilitated the reputation of Dietrich as a hero of the Revolution.

== Notes, citations, and sources ==
Preceded by	Mayor of Strasbourg; 1790–1792	Succeeded by Bernard-Frédéric de Turckheim
