= Reichshoffen =

- Commune
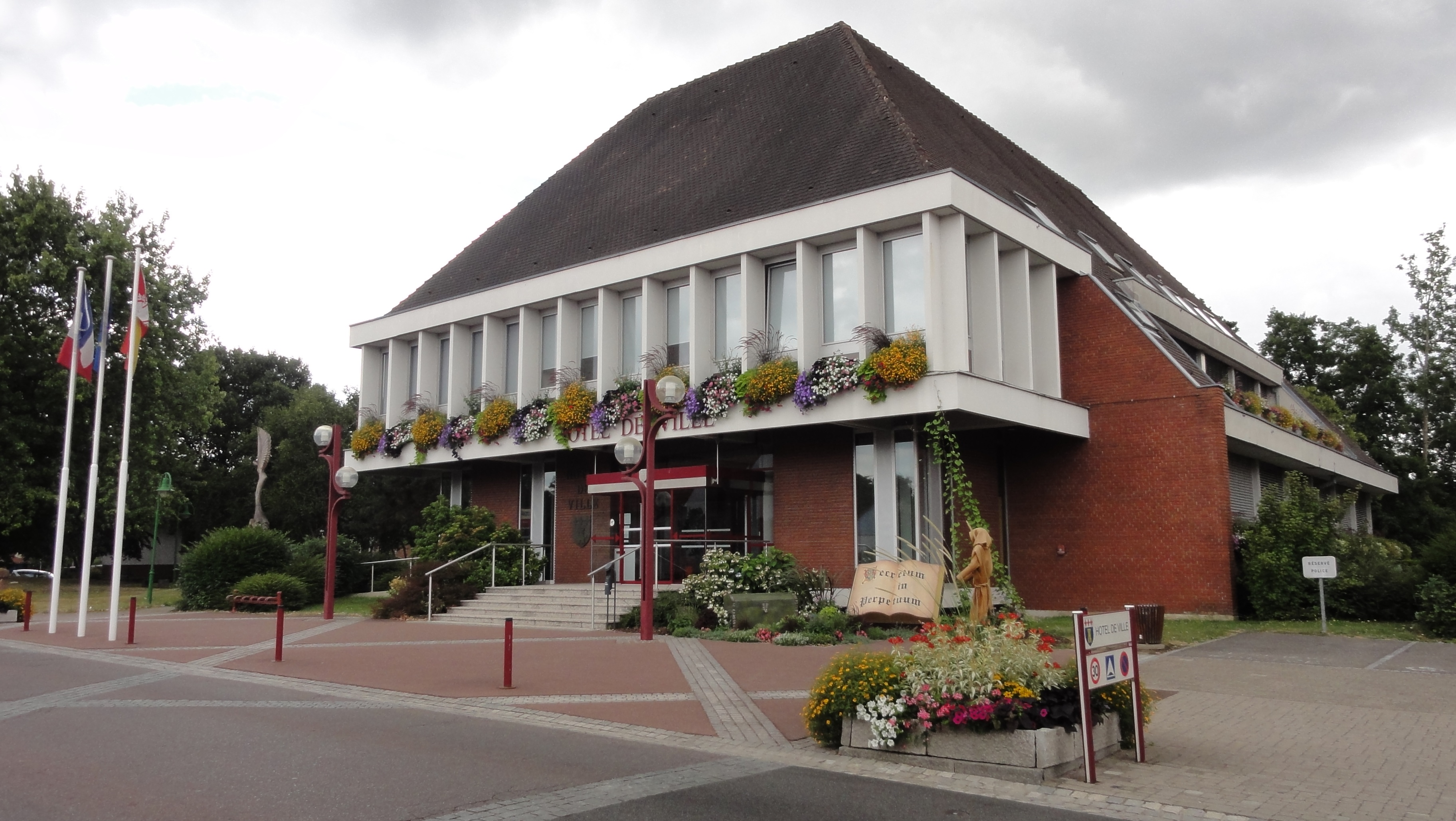
- The town hall in Reichshoffen

- Coat of arms
- Location of Reichshoffen
- Location within France Location within Grand Est
- Coordinates: 48°56′06″N 7°40′01″E
- Country: France
- Region: Grand Est
- Department: Bas-Rhin
- Arrondissement: Haguenau-Wissembourg
- Canton: Reichshoffen

Government
  - Mayor (2020–2026): Hubert Walter
- Area^{1}: 17.64 km^{2} (6.81 sq mi)
- Highest elevation: 301 m (988 ft)
- Lowest elevation: 170 m (560 ft)
- Population (2023): 5,418
  - Density: 307.1/km^{2} (795.5/sq mi)
- Time zone: UTC+01:00 (CET)
  - Summer (DST): UTC+02:00 (CEST)
- INSEE/Postal code: 67388 /67110
- ^{1} French Land Register data, which excludes lakes, ponds, glaciers > 1 km^{2} (0.386 sq mi or 247 acres) and river estuaries.

Reichshoffen (French pronunciation: [ʁaiʃ(s)ofən] or [ʁaiçsofən]; German: Reichshofen; Alsatian: Risshoffe) is a commune in the Bas-Rhin department in Grand Est in north-eastern France. Église Saint-Michel de Reichshoffen was built in 1772.

== Economy ==
Reichshoffen is home to CAF Reichshoffen railcar operations, formerly owned by Alstom.

== Population ==
Historical population
Year	Pop.	±% p.a.
1968	4,612	—
1975	5,035	+1.26%
1982	5,034	−0.00%
1990	5,092	+0.14%
1999	5,183	+0.20%
2007	5,577	+0.92%
2012	5,516	−0.22%
2017	5,396	−0.44%
2023	5,418	+0.07%
Source: INSEE

== Politics and administration ==
=== List of mayors ===
List of successive Mayors of Reichshoffen since 1945
In office		Name	Party	Capacity	Ref.
1945	May 1953	Comte Jean de Leusse			
May 1953	March 1971	Comte Pierre de Leusse			
March 1971	March 1989	François Grussenmeyer	UDR then RPR	Deputy (1958-1993)	
March 1989	March 2001	Charles Antoine Zimmer	DVG	Teacher	
March 2001	Incumbent	Hubert Walter	UMP-LR	Regional councilor for the Grand Est (2015-) Vice-President of the CC du Pays de Niederbronn-les-Bains	2020 el.

=== Twin towns ===
- Kandel (Germany) since 1961.

== See also ==
- Battle of Wörth, also known as the Battle of Reichshoffen
- Château de Dietrich
- Communes of the Bas-Rhin department
