= List of people from Strasbourg =

This list includes notable people who were born in Strasbourg or have lived there as notable residents, spanning from the early medieval period to the present day.

== Born in Strasbourg ==
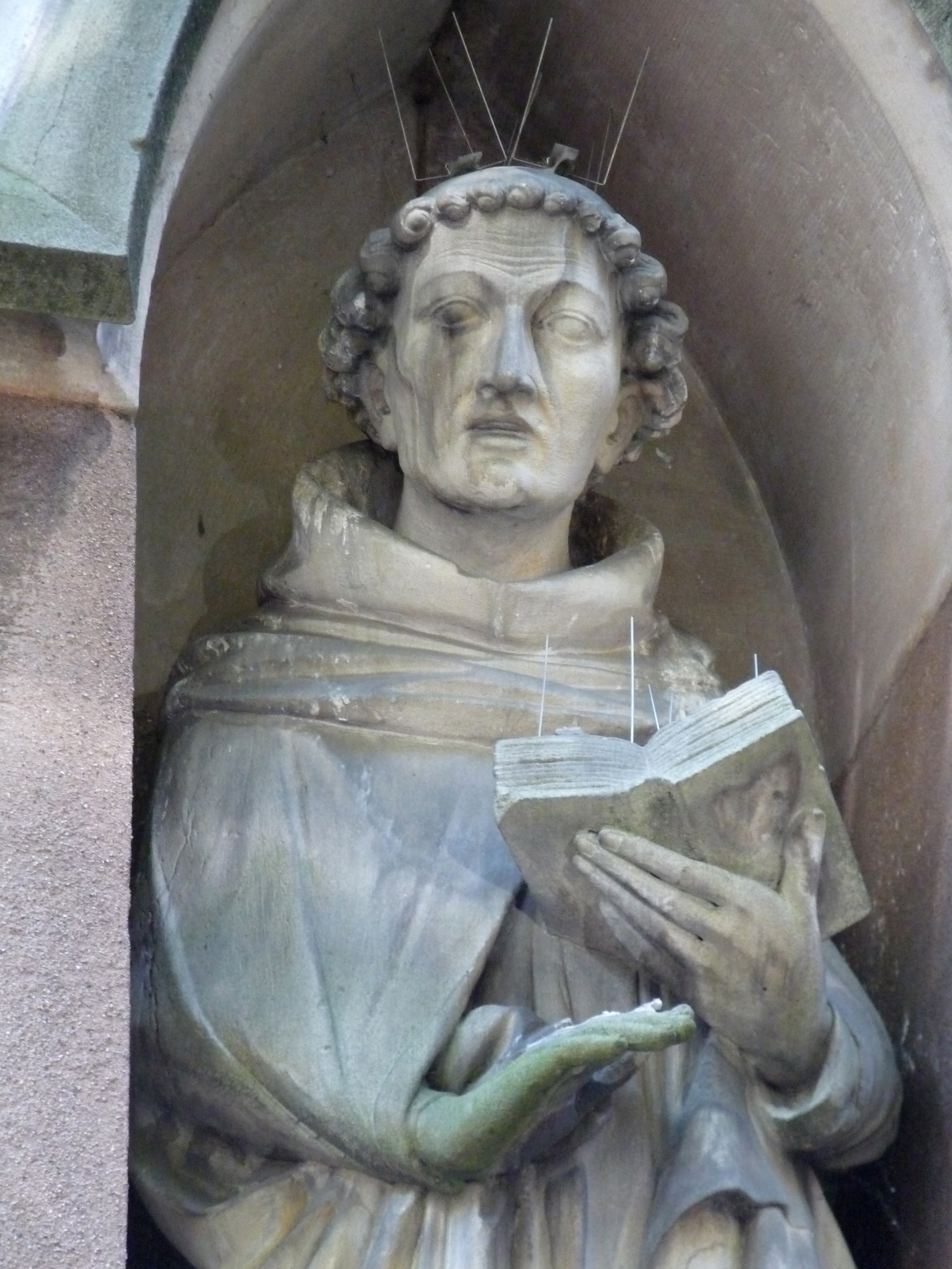
Johannes Tauler

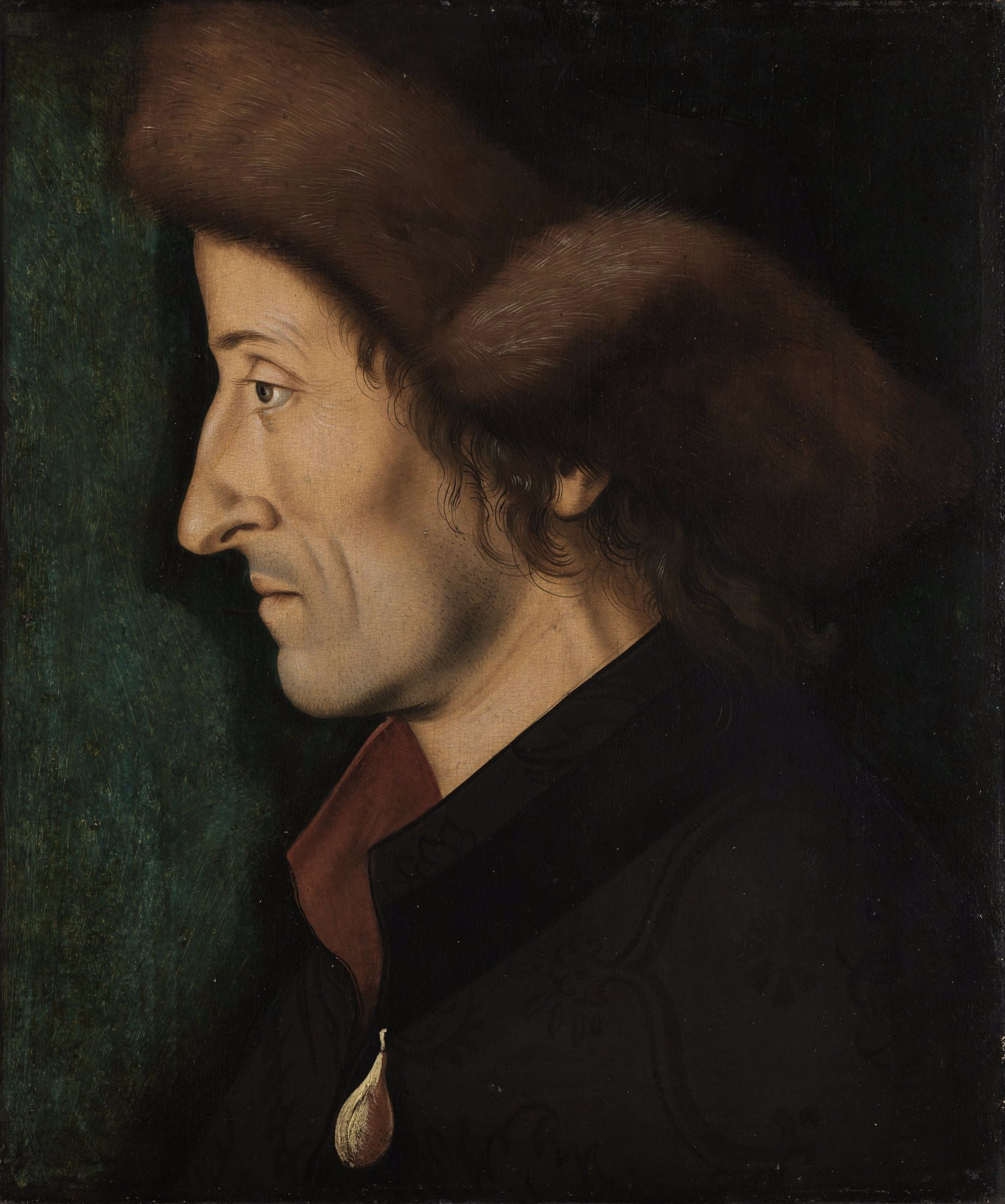
Sebastian Brant

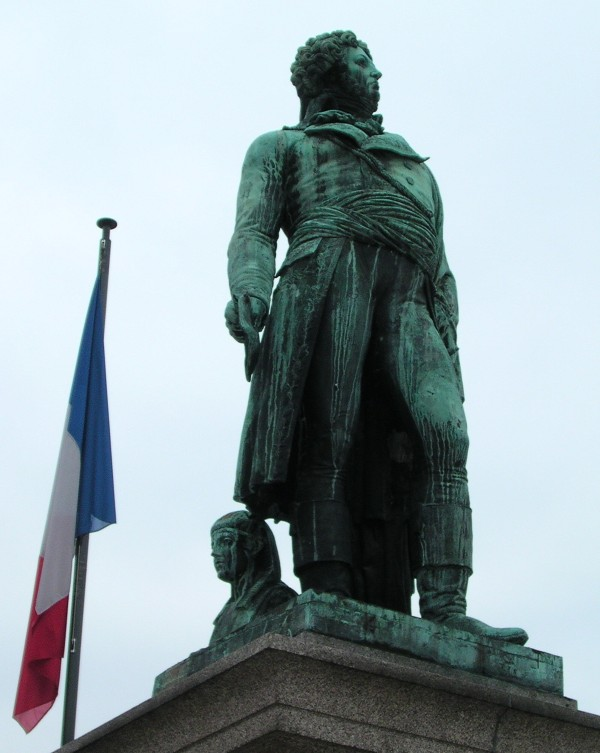
Jean-Baptiste Kléber

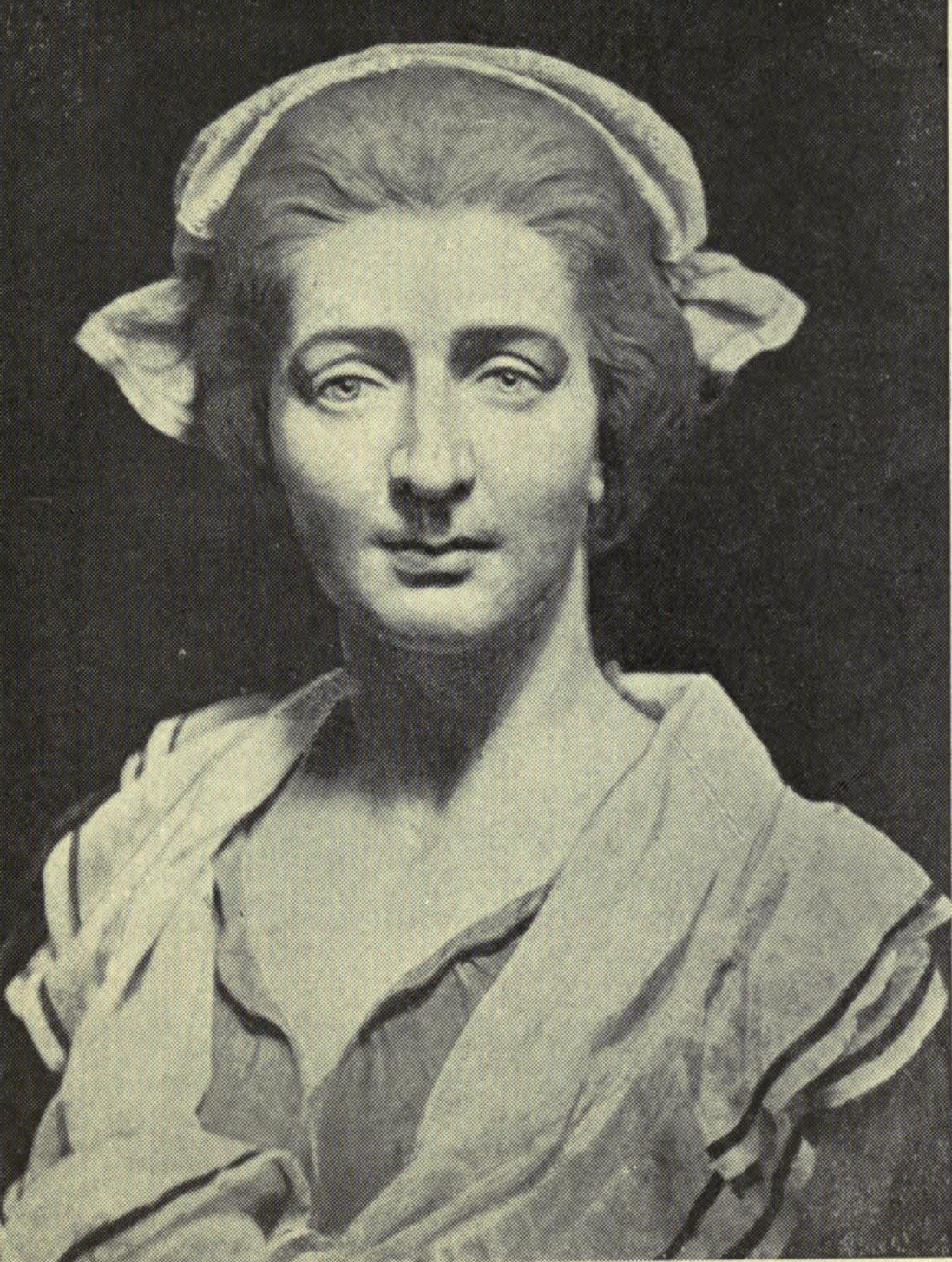
Marie Tussaud

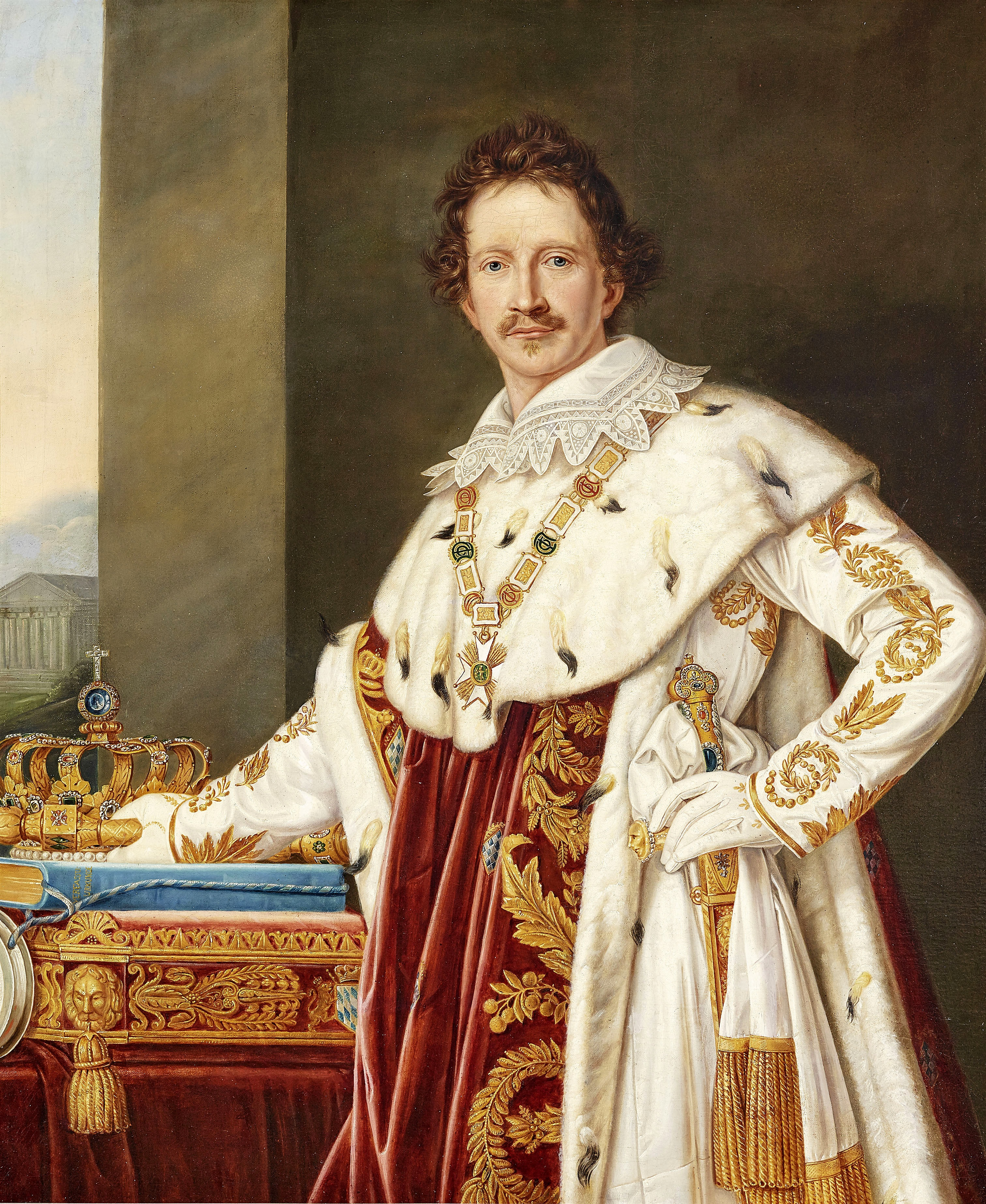
Ludwig I of Bavaria

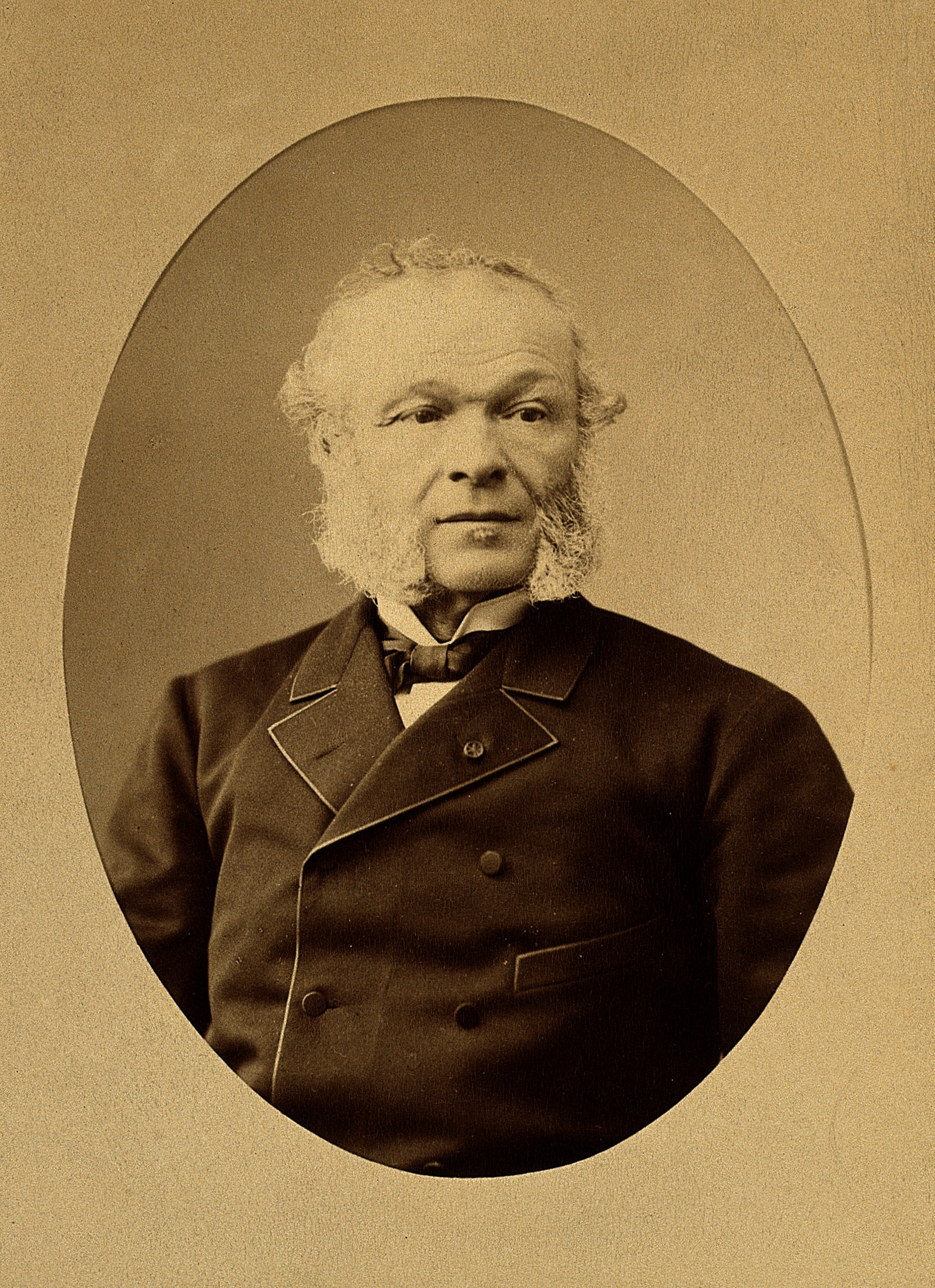
Charles Adolphe Wurtz

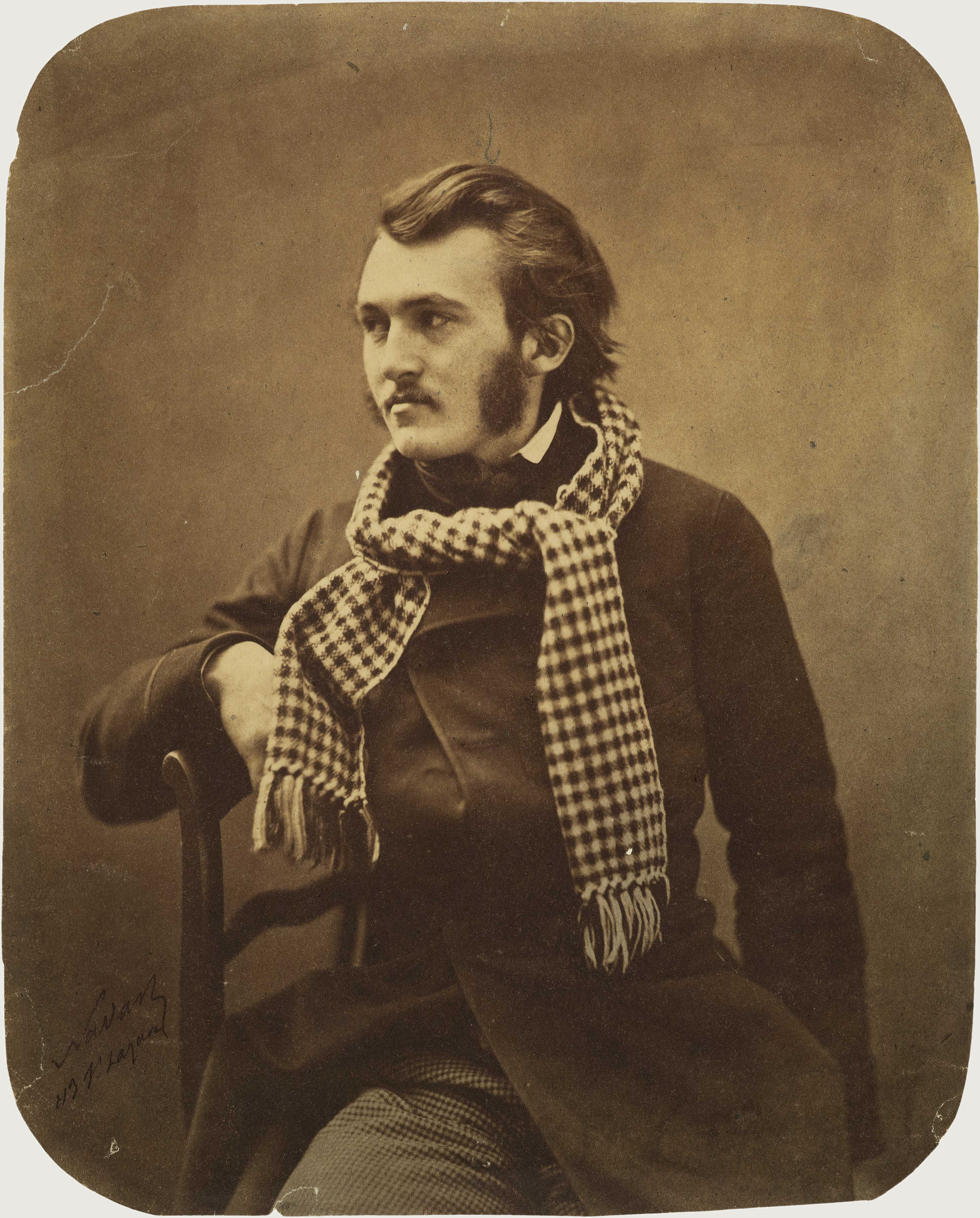
Gustave Doré

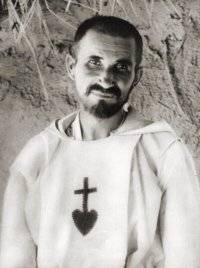
Charles de Foucauld

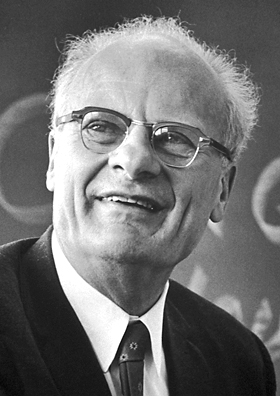
Hans Bethe

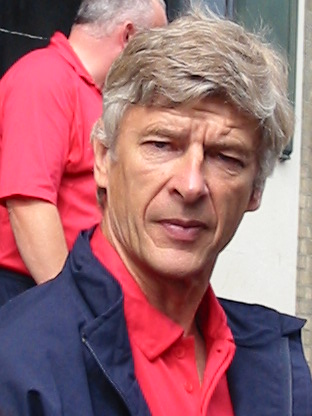
Arsène Wenger

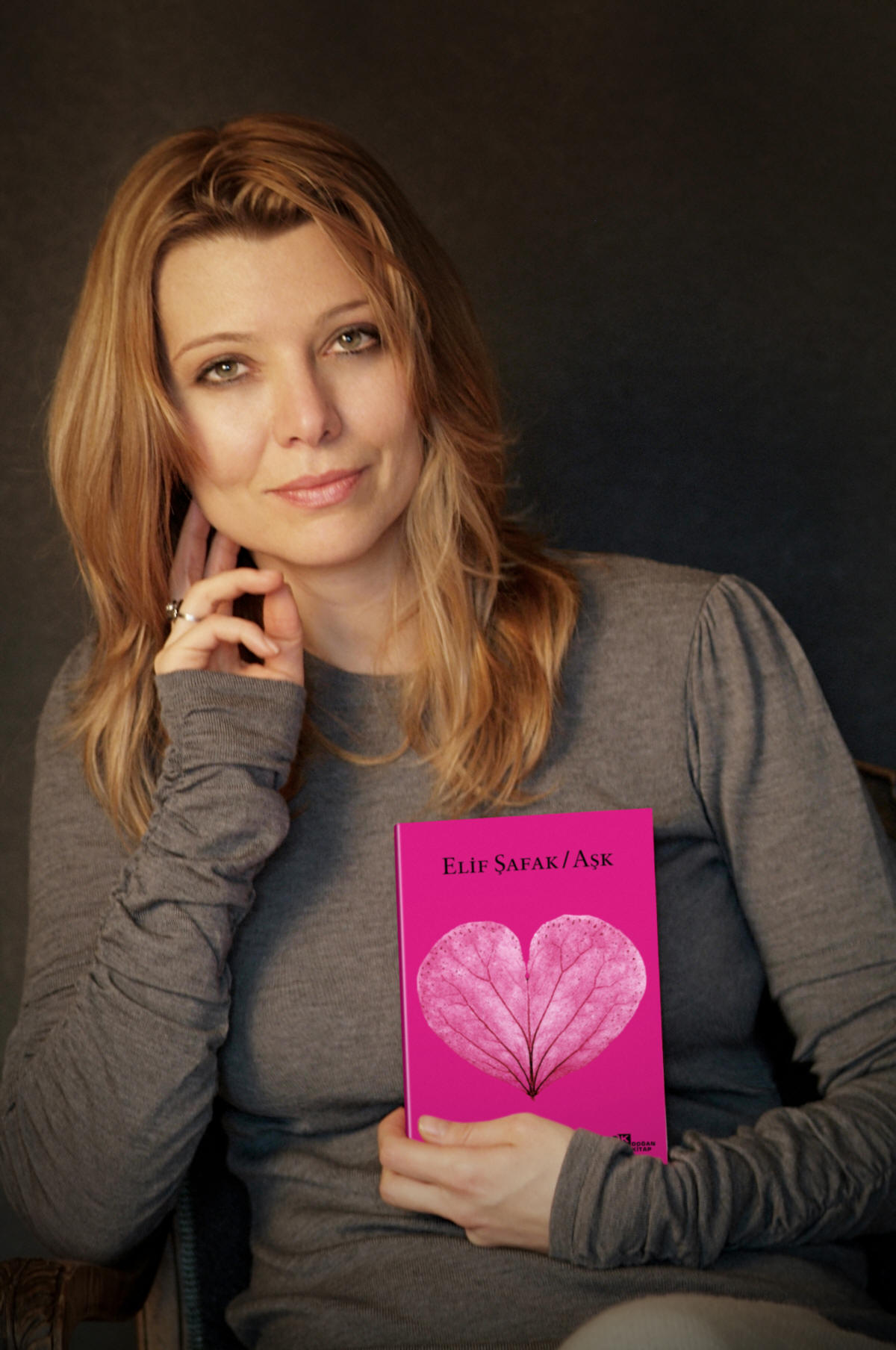
Elif Şafak

=== Before 1750 ===
- Eric of Friuli (8th century), Frankish duke of Friuli
- Hugh Ripelin of Strasburg (ca. 1205–ca. 1270), theologian
- Johannes Tauler (1300–1361), mystic and theologian
- Fritsche Closener (died before 1373), priest, historian
- Rulman Merswin (ca. 1307–1382), mystic
- Jakob Twinger von Königshofen (1346–1420), chronicler
- Martin Schott (d. 1499), printer
- Johannes Schott (1477–1550), printer
- Hieronymus Brunschwig (ca. 1450–ca. 1512), surgeon, alchemist and botanist
- Sebastian Brant (1457–1521), satirical poet and humanist
- Ottmar Luscinius (1478–1537), theologian and humanist
- Hans Kotter (1480–1541), composer and organist
- Wilhelm Stetter (1487–1552), painter and priest
- Jacob Sturm von Sturmeck (1489–1553), Protestant statesman and reformist
- Andreas Cratander (1490–1540), printer
- Katharina Zell (1497–1568), Protestant writer
- Jacob Micyllus (1503–1558), humanist and teacher
- Martin Schalling the Younger (1532–1608), Protestant theologian and writer
- Daniel Specklin (1536–1589), architect, engineer and cartographer
- Johann Fischart (1545–1591), satirical author
- Johannes Piscator (1546–1625), theologian and translator
- Johann Theodor de Bry (1561–1623), engraver and publisher
- Sebastian Stoskopff (1597–1657), painter
- Johann Wilhelm Baur (1607–1640), engraver, etcher and miniature painter
- Albrecht Kauw (1621–1681), painter
- Marie Luise von Degenfeld (1634–1677), morganatic second wife of Charles I Louis, Elector Palatine
- Countess Palatine Anna Magdalena of Birkenfeld-Bischweiler (1640–1693)
- Christian III, Count Palatine of Zweibrücken (1674–1735)
- Friedrich Ludwig, Prince of Hohenzollern-Hechingen (1688–1750)
- Jacques-Antoine Denoyé (died 1759), composer and organist
- Countess Palatine Caroline of Zweibrücken (1721–1774)
- Dagobert Sigmund von Wurmser (1724–1797), Austrian field marshal
- Johann Georg Roederer (1726–1763), physician and obstetrician
- Richard François Philippe Brunck (1729–1803), French classical scholar
- Jean-Joseph Rodolphe (1730–1812), horn player, violinist and composer
- Jérémie-Jacques Oberlin (1735–1806), philologist and archaeologist
- François Christophe Kellermann (1735–1820), French marshall
- Christoph Wilhelm von Koch (1737–1813), diplomat, politician, librarian and writer
- Philippe Rühl (1737–1795), politician
- Ludwig Heinrich von Nicolay (1737–1820), poet and President of the St. Petersburg Academy of Sciences
- Philip James de Loutherbourg (1740–1812), painter
- Jean-Frédéric Oberlin (1740–1826), pastor and philanthropist
- Johann Christian von Mannlich (1741–1822), painter and architect
- Heinrich Leopold Wagner (1747–1779), writer
- Philippe Friedrich Dietrich (1748–1793), scholar and politician
- Jean-Frédéric Edelmann (1749–1794), composer
- Johan Peter Rottler (1749–1836), missionary and botanist
- Johann von Türckheim (1749–1824), diplomat

=== Between 1750 and 1900 ===
- Sébastien Érard (1752–1837), instrument maker
- Philippe-André Grandidier (1752–1787), priest and historian
- Bernard-Frédéric de Turckheim (1752–1831), politician
- Jean Baptiste Kléber (1753–1800), architect and general
- Jean-François Barbier (1754–1828), general
- Louis Ramond de Carbonnières (1755–1827), politician, geologist and botanist
- Antoinette Saint-Huberty (1756–1812), opera singer
- Christophe Guérin (1758–1831), engraver and painter
- François Andrieux (1759–1833), playwright and poet
- Jacques Widerkehr (1759–1823), cellist and composer
- Joseph Ludwig Colmar (1760–1818), bishop of Mainz
- Christian Kramp (1760–1826), mathematician
- Marie Tussaud (1761–1850), founder of Madame Tussauds
- Johann Jakob Humann (1771–1834) Roman Catholic clergyman
- Charles-Joseph Christiani (1772–1840), Maréchal de camp of the French Army
- Louis-François Lejeune (1775–1848), general, painter, and lithographer
- Jean-Baptiste Schwilgué (1776–1856), clockmaker
- Chrétien Géofroy Nestler (1778–1832), botanist and pharmacist
- Johann Georg Daniel Arnold (1780–1829), lawyer and writer
- Samson Cerfberr (1780–1826), soldier and author
- Jean-Georges Humann (1780–1842), statesman
- Jean-Frédéric de Turckheim (1780–1850), politician
- Gustave Vogt (1781–1870), oboist and composer
- Maximilien Joseph Schauenburg (1784–1838), military officer
- Ludwig I of Bavaria (1786–1868)
- Camille Pleyel (1788–1855), piano manufacturer and musical entrepreneur
- Princess Augusta of Bavaria (1788–1851)
- Édouard Spach (1801–1879), botanist
- Marie-Théodore Ratisbonne (1802–1884), Catholic priest and missionary
- Baruch Schleisinger Weil (1802–1893), American businessman and politician
- August Stöber (1808–1884), poet, scholar and collector of folklore
- Louis Roederer (1809–1870), champagne maker
- Jean-Georges Kastner (1810–1867), composer and musicologist
- Adolphe Stoeber (1810–1892), ecclesiastic and writer
- August Eduard Cunitz (1812–1886), Protestant theologian
- Marie-Alphonse Ratisbonne (1814–1884), Catholic priest and missionary
- Louis Charles Auguste Steinheil (1814–1885), painter
- Émile Küss (1815–1871), physician and politician
- Charles Adolphe Wurtz (1818–1884), chemist
- Charles Frédéric Gerhardt (1818–1856), chemist
- Benjamin-Constant Martha (1820–1895), historian
- August Kayser (1821–1885), Protestant theologian
- Théophile Schuler (1821–1878), painter and illustrator
- Hippolyte Pradelles (1824–1913), painter
- Oscar Berger-Levrault (1826–1903), philatelist
- Charles Netter (1826–1882), French Zionist
- Louis Ratisbonne (1827–1900), writer
- Paul Schützenberger (1829–1897), chemist
- Frédéric Albert Constantin Weber (1830–1903), botanist
- Gustave Doré (1832–1883), painter
- Charles Friedel (1832–1899), chemist and mineralogist
- Frédéric Auguste Lichtenberger (1832–1899), theologian
- Mélanie de Pourtalès (1836–1914), socialite
- Émile Waldteufel (1837–1915), composer
- Édouard Schuré (1841–1929), philosopher
- Edward Dannreuther (1844–1905), pianist and musicologist
- Nicolas Delsor (1847–1927), priest and politician
- Alfred Morel-Fatio (1850–1924), hispanist
- Jules Martha (1853–1932), archaeologist
- Paul Émile Appell (1855–1930), mathematician
- Andreas Franz Wilhelm Schimper (1856–1901), botanist and phytogeographer
- Léon Wieger (1856–1933), Jesuit missionary, medical doctor, theologist and sinologist
- Charles de Foucauld (1858–1916), Christian mystic
- Franz Zorn von Bulach (1858–1925), Catholic bishop
- Charles Diehl (1859–1944), historian
- Hugo Becker (1863–1941), cellist, cello teacher, and composer
- Charles Andler (1866–1933), germanist and philosopher
- Eugène Wilhelm (1866–1951), lawyer, judge and writer
- Ernest Henri Demanne (1870–1938), comedian
- André Lichtenberger (1870–1940), novelist and sociologist
- Helmar Lerski (1871–1956), photographer
- Heinrich Emil Timerding (1873–1945), mathematician
- Heinrich Liebmann (1874–1939), mathematician and geometer
- Max Looff (1874–1954), naval officer
- Karl Wendling (1875–1962), violinist and musical educator
- Léo Schnug (1878–1933), painter and illustrator
- Karl Klingler (1879–1971), violinist and composer
- Émile Mathis (1880–1956), car manufacturer
- Richard Laqueur (1881–1959), historian and philologist
- Elisabeth Abegg (1882–1974), educator and Nazi resistance fighter
- Ernst Damzog (1882–1945), Brigadeführer of the SS
- Robert Redslob (1882–1962), constitutional and public international law-scientist
- Georges Weill (1882–1970), German politician who defected to France
- Otto Froitzheim (1884–1962), tennis player
- Paul Gröber (1885–1964), geologist
- Jean/Hans Arp (1886–1966), artist
- René Beeh (1886–1822), painter and draughtsman
- Robert Heger (1886–1978), conductor
- Hilla von Rebay (1890–1967), artist, museum director
- Jules Kruger (1891–1959), cinematographer
- Charles Münch (1891–1968), conductor
- Friedrich-Georg Eberhardt (1892–1964), general
- Friedrich-Wilhelm Krüger (1894–1945), Nazi official and high-ranking member of the SA and the SS
- Marcelle Cahn (1895–1981), artist
- Hans-Georg von Friedeburg (1895–1945), admiral of the Kriegsmarine
- Paul Alverdes (1897–1979), novelist and poet
- Rudolf Schwarz (1897–1961), architect

=== After 1900 ===
- Robert Kuven (1901-1983), German/French artist
- Hans Heinz Stuckenschmidt (1901–1988), musicologist
- Charles Ehresmann (1905–1979), mathematician
- Hans Bethe (1906–2005), physicist, Nobel Prize winner
- Gerolf Steiner (1908–2009), zoologist
- Hans-Otto Meissner (1909–1992), writer
- Max Bense (1910–1990), philosopher
- Georges Loinger (1910–2018), member of the French Resistance
- Jean-Paul de Dadelsen (1913–1957), poet and journalist
- Antoinette Becker (1920–1998), writer and translator
- Jacques Martin (1921–2010), comic-book artist
- Germain Muller (1923–1994), playwright, songwriter, poet, actor, humourist, politician
- Marcel Marceau (1923–2007), mime
- Serge Leclaire (1924–1994), psychiatrist and psychoanalyst
- Pierre Weil (1924–2008), psychologist and educator
- Noah Klieger (1926–2018), journalist
- Francis Rapp (1926–2020), historian
- Claude Rich (1929–2017), actor
- Tomi Ungerer (1931–2019), writer, illustrator and caricaturist
- Solange Fernex (1934–2006), politician
- Liliane Ackermann (1938–2007), French Jewish community leader
- Gilbert Gress (born 1941), football coach
- Jean-Pierre Hubert (1941–2006), author
- Isoldé Elchlepp (born 1942) German protest song singer, and operatic mezzo-soprano and soprano
- Wolfgang Huber (born 1942), theologian and ethicist
- Bob Wollek (1943–2001), rally driver
- Herbert Léonard (born 1945), singer
- Jean-Louis Mandel (born 1946), geneticist
- Joseph Daul (born 1947), politician
- Thierry Mugler (1948–2022), fashion designer
- Francis Wurtz (born 1948), politician
- Michel Warschawski (born 1949), Israeli anti-Zionist writer and activist
- Arsène Wenger OBE (born 1949), football manager
- Jean-Marie Bockel (born 1950), politician
- Catherine Trautmann (born 1951), politician
- Patrice Meyer (born 1957), guitarist
- Elizabeth Sombart (born 1958), pianist
- Alain Weill (born 1961), business executive
- Patrick Cahuzac (born 1963), writer, winner of the Prix Fénéon for literature in 1990
- Emmanuel Villaume (born 1964), conductor
- Carole Richert (born 1967), actress
- Christophe Ohrel (born 1968), football player
- Philippe Schaaf (born 1968), handball player
- Eliette Abécassis (born 1969), writer
- Yvon Riemer (born 1970), wrestler
- Yann Wehrling (born 1971), artist and leader of the French Green Party
- Elif Şafak (born 1971), writer
- Alexis Kohler (born 1972), politician
- Valérien Ismaël (born 1975), football player
- Armando Teixeira (born 1976), football player
- Mehdi Baala (born 1978), athlete
- Nicolas Mougin (born 1979), professional vert skater
- Blandine Brocard (born 1981), politician
- Paul-Henri Mathieu (born 1982), tennis player
- Antoine Grauss (born 1984), football player
- Pio Marmaï (born 1984), actor
- Karim Matmour (born 1985), football player
- Laura Weissbecker (born 1984), actress
- M. Pokora (born 1985), singer
- Candice Didier (born 1988), figure skater
- Jonathan Schmid (born 1990), football player
- Jonathan Clauss (born 1992), football player

== Notable residents of Strasbourg ==
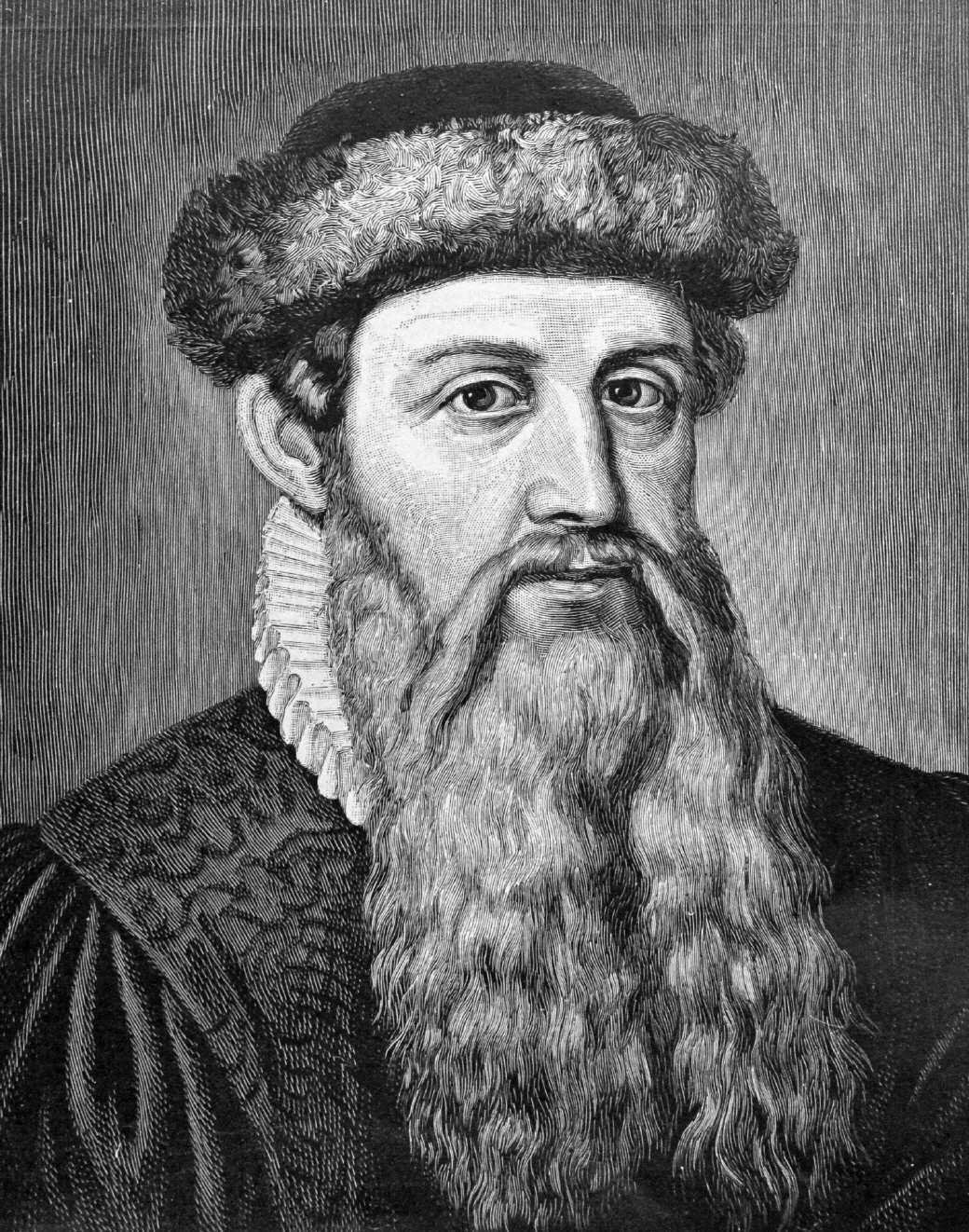
Johannes Gutenberg

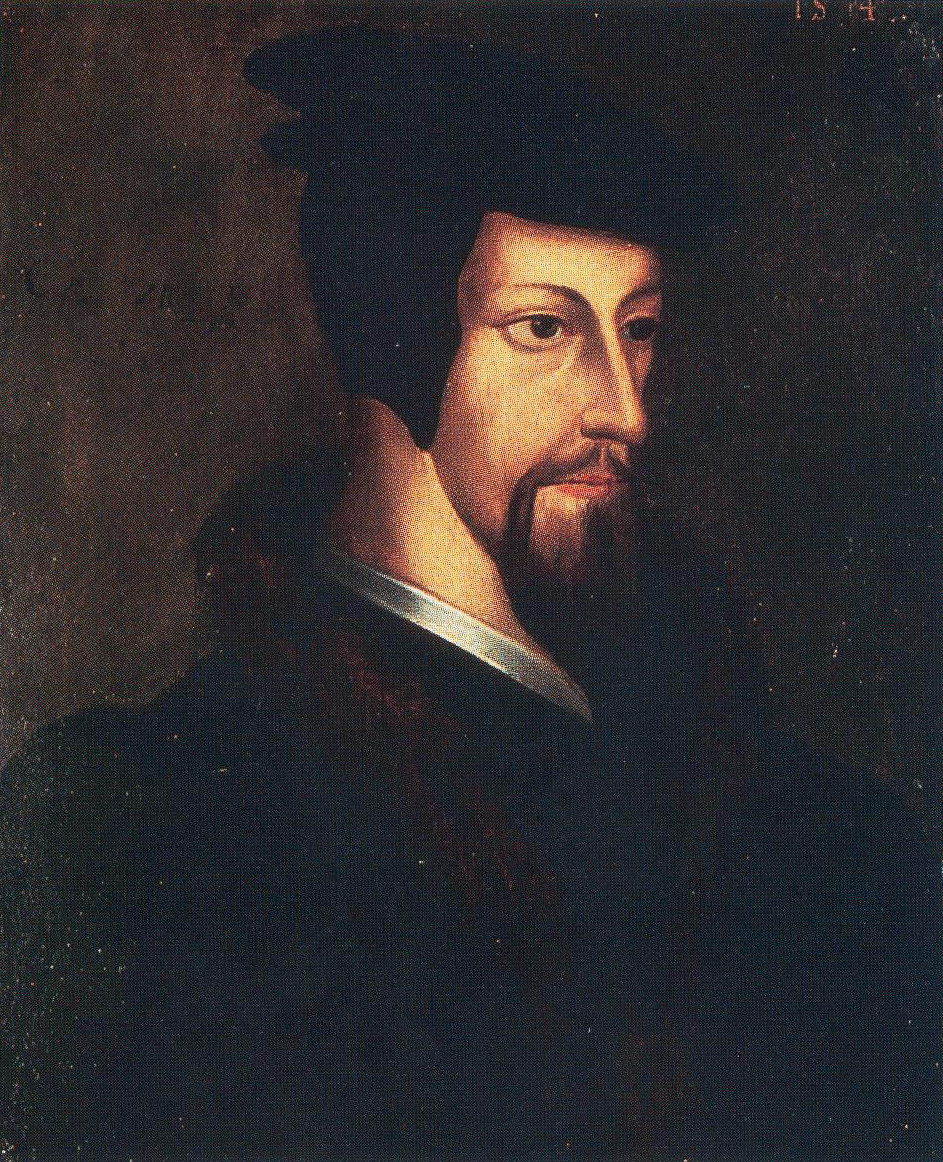
John Calvin

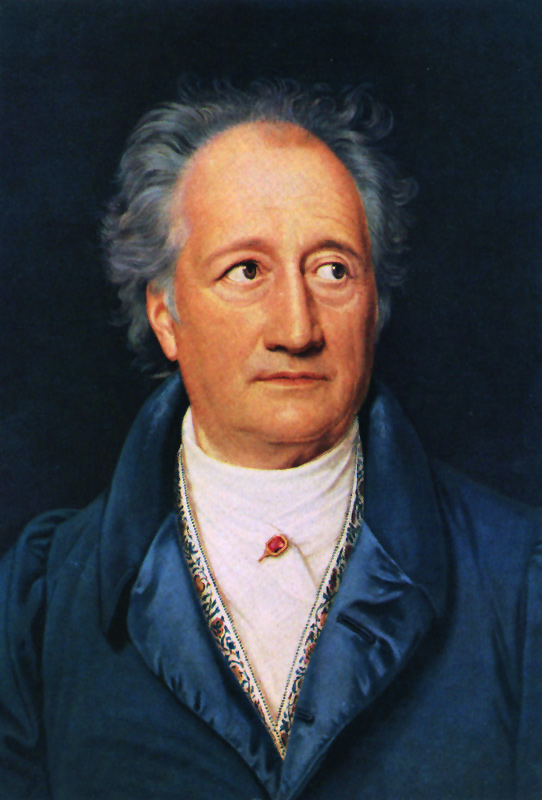
Johann Wolfgang Goethe

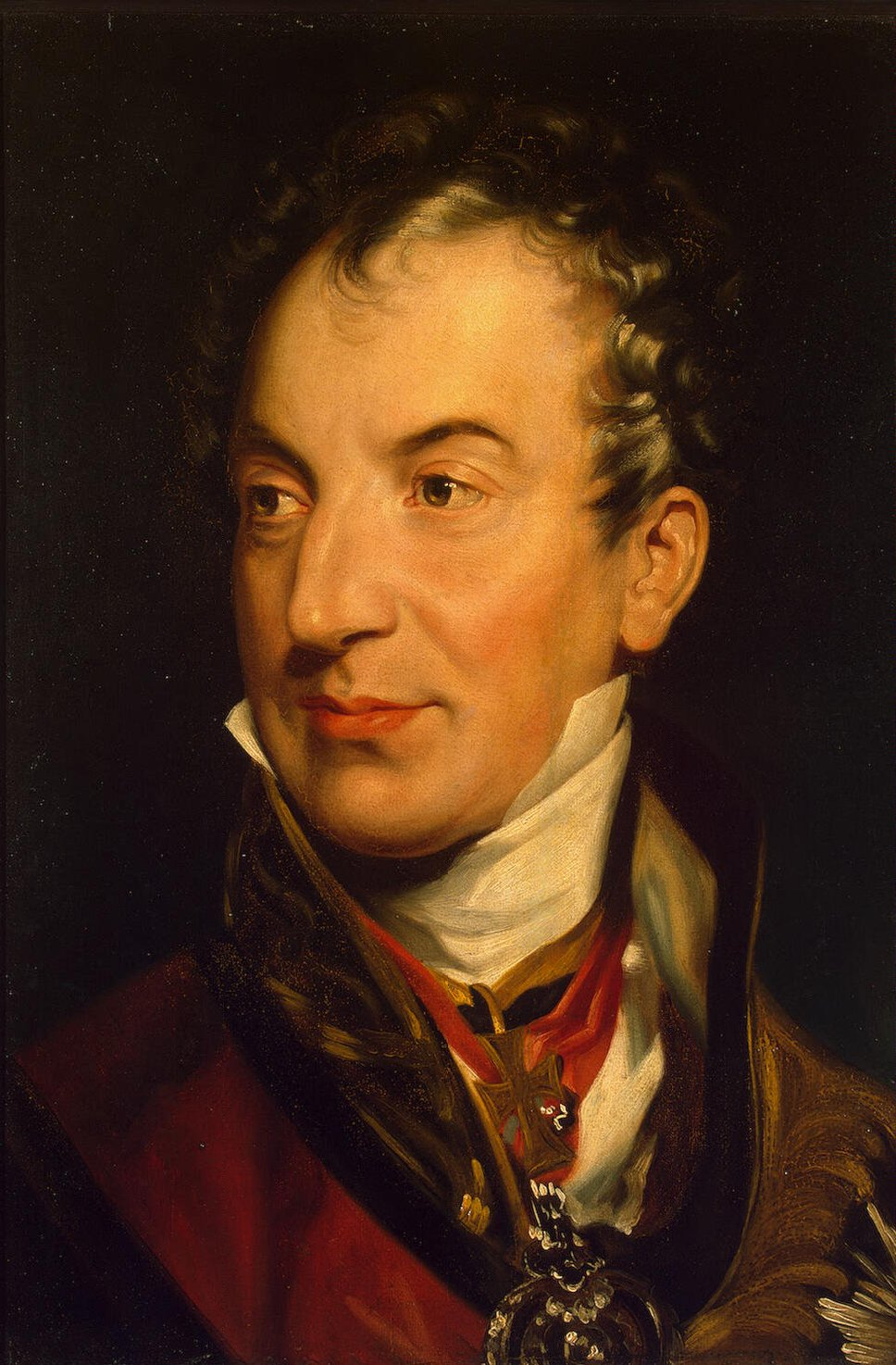
Klemens von Metternich

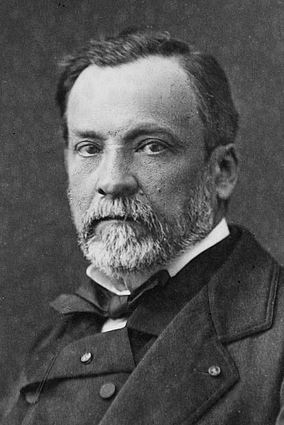
Louis Pasteur

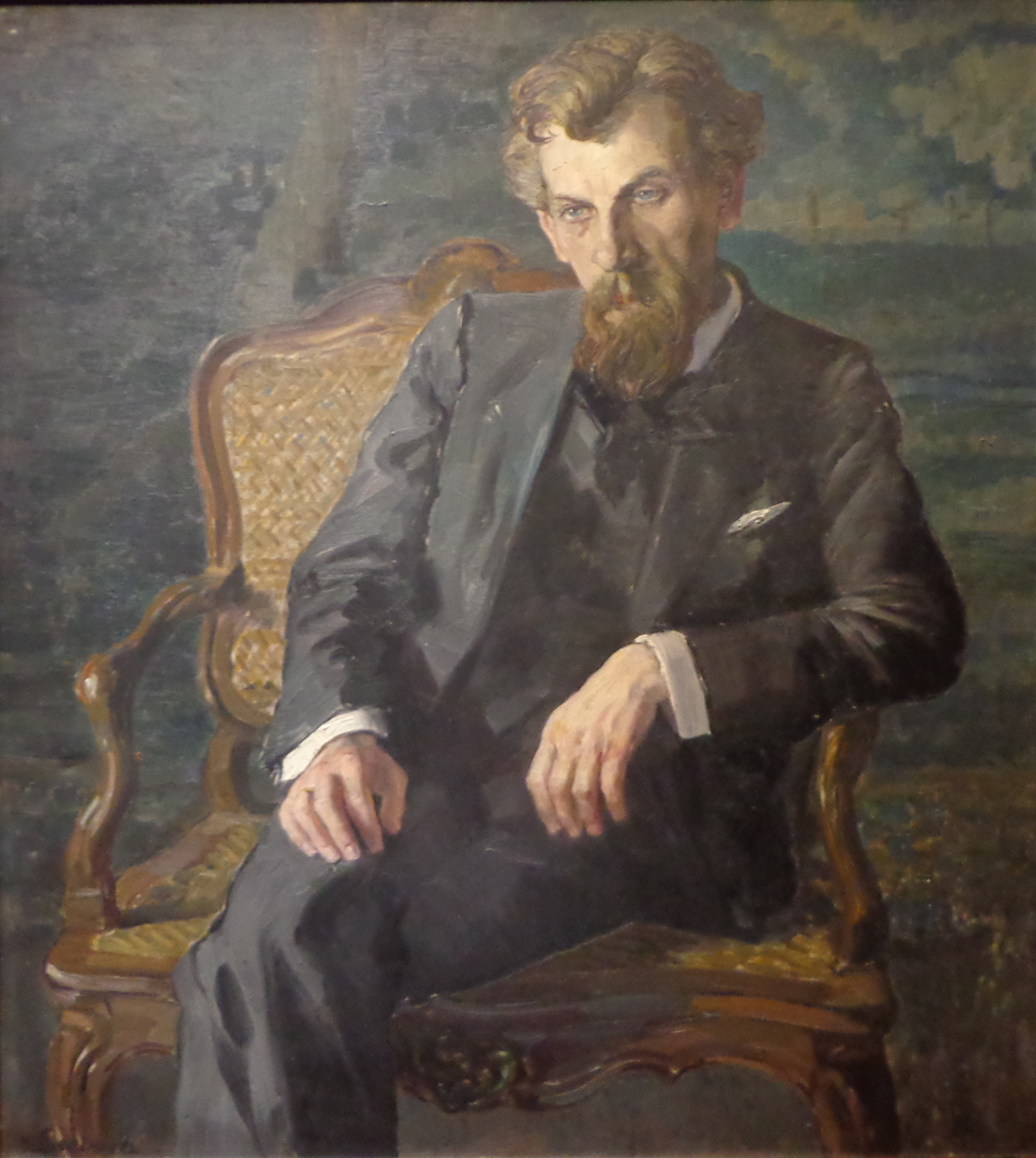
Hans Pfitzner

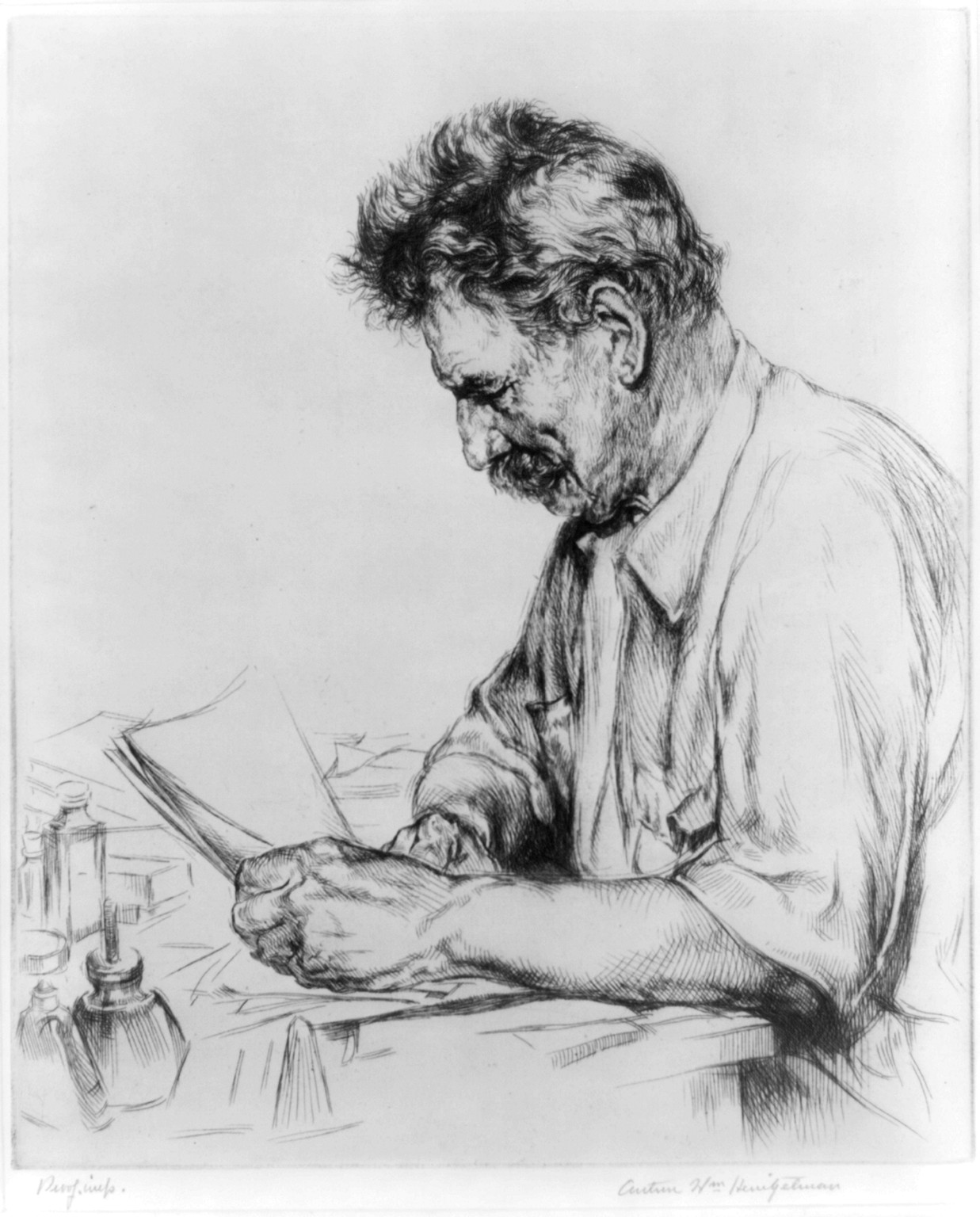
Albert Schweitzer

- Meister Eckhart (1260–1328), philosopher
- Johannes Gutenberg (1400–1468), inventor of printing with movable type
- Johann Geiler von Kaisersberg (1445–1510), preacher
- Erasmus (1467–1536), humanist
- Hans Baldung (1484–1545), painter
- Beatus Rhenanus (1485–1547), humanist
- Caspar Schwenckfeld (1489–1561), theologian
- Martin Bucer (1491–1551), Reformation leader
- Johannes Sleidanus (1506–1556), German historian, the annalist of the Reformation
- Johannes Sturm (1507–1589), teacher and pedagogue
- John Calvin (1509–1564), Reformation leader
- Michael Servetus (1511–1553), Spanish theologian, physician and humanist
- Joachim Meyer (1537?–1571), fencer, author of an influential fechtbuch
- Tobias Stimmer (1539–1584), Swiss painter
- Johann Carolus (1575–1634), German publisher
- François-Marie, 1st duc de Broglie (1671–1745), marshall and governor of Strasbourg
- Johann Daniel Schöpflin (1694–1771), historian and jurist, Goethe's teacher at Strasbourg University
- Franz Xaver Richter (1709–1789), composer, eminent member of the Mannheim school
- Johann Hermann (1738–1800), French physician and naturalist
- Johann Wolfgang von Goethe (1749–1832), poet, playwright, novelist, researcher
- Jakob Michael Reinhold Lenz (1751–1792), poet
- King Maximilian I Joseph of Bavaria (1756–1825), spent several years in Strasbourg
- Wolfgang Amadeus Mozart (1756–1791), composer, spent 23 days there in 1778
- Ignaz Pleyel (1757–1831), served as Kapellmeister at the Cathedral in 1789
- Maximilian von Montgelas (1759–1838), Bavarian statesman
- Claude Joseph Rouget de Lisle (1760–1836), composer of the Marseillaise
- Klemens von Metternich (1773–1859), studied in Strasbourg from 1788 to 1790
- Georg Büchner (1813–1837), writer
- Numa Denis Fustel de Coulanges (1830–1889), historian
- Louis Pasteur (1830–1895), scientist
- Viktor Nessler (1841–1890), composer
- Lujo Brentano (1844–1931), economist
- Karl Ferdinand Braun (1850–1918), physicist, Nobel Prize
- Albrecht Kossel (1853–1927), medical doctor, Nobel Prize
- Georg Simmel (1858–1918), sociologist
- Georges Friedel (1865–1933), mineralogist, son of Charles Friedel
- Hans Pfitzner (1869–1949), composer
- Fritz Beblo (1872–1947), architect
- Jean-Jacques Waltz aka Hansi (1873–1951), artist
- Albert Schweitzer (1875–1965), theologian, philosopher, physician and musician
- Paul Rohmer (1876–1977), physician, considered as one of the fathers of modern paediatrics
- Maurice Halbwachs (1877–1945), sociologist
- Otto Meißner (1880–1953), politician, father of Hans-Otto Meissner
- Otto Klemperer (1885–1973), conductor
- Marc Bloch (1886–1944), historian and resistant
- Hans Rosbaud (1895–1962), conductor
- George Szell (1897–1970), conductor
- Emmanuel Lévinas (1906–1995), philosopher
- Maurice Blanchot (1907–2003), writer and philosopher
- Pierre Pflimlin (1907–2000), politician
- Lucie Aubrac (born 1912) and Raymond Aubrac (born 1914), founding members of the Résistance
- Antoinette Feuerwerker (1912–2003), jurist, member of the Résistance
- Ernest Bour (1913–2001), conductor
- Paul Ricoeur (1913–2005), philosopher
- Salomon Gluck (1914–1944), physician, member of the Résistance
- Rose Warfman (born 1916), nurse, survivor of Auschwitz and member of the Résistance
- Hélène Boschi (1917–1990) pianist
- René Thom (1923–2002), mathematician
- Guy Debord (1931–1994), philosopher
- Sarkis Zabunyan (born 1938), painter
- Alberto Fujimori (born 1938), Peruvian president
- Jean-Marie Lehn (born 1939), Nobel Prize for chemistry 1987
- Alain Lombard (born 1940), conductor
- Philippe Lacoue-Labarthe (1940–2007), philosopher
- Jean-Luc Nancy (born 1940), philosopher
- Jules Hoffmann (born 1941), Nobel Prize in Physiology or Medicine 2011
- Georges Aperghis (born 1945), composer
- Bernard-Marie Koltès (1948–1989), playwright
- Barbara Honigmann (born 1949), German writer and painter
- Pierre Moerlen (1952–2005), musician
- Ségolène Royal (born 1953), leading member of the Parti Socialiste, went to school in Strasbourg
- Thomas Ebbesen (born 1954), physical chemist
- John Howe (born 1957), artist
- Mireille Delunsch (born 1962), soprano
- Marjane Satrapi (1969–2026), comic-strip artist
