= André Pomarat =

French actor and theatre director (1930–2020)

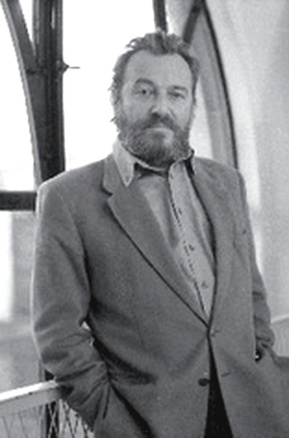
- Pomarat in 1991
- Born: 8 January 1930; Thimonville, France
- Died: 30 April 2020 (aged 89); Strasbourg, France
- Occupations: Actor; Theatre Director

André Pomarat (8 January 1930 – 30 April 2020) was a French actor and theatre director.

Pomarat was a student of the first graduating class of the École supérieure d'art dramatique de Strasbourg. He joined the permanent troupe at the Comédie de l'Est, which became the National Theatre of Strasbourg. He acted in around forty shows, notably under the direction of Hubert Gignoux, Pierre Lefèvre, and Julie Brochen. In 1974, he founded the TJP Centre dramatique national de Strasbourg, which he directed until 1997. In 1976, he created the Festival des Giboulées de la Marionnette.

== Biography ==
Pomarat was born in Thimonville, a commune in Moselle of approximately 200 inhabitants. During World War II, his family took refuge in Southern France. After he returned to Moselle, he participated in amateur troupes such as Équipe Joie and La Pléiade. He studied at the Conservatoire à rayonnement régional de Nancy and Metz. In 1954, he enrolled in the first classes at the École supérieure d'art dramatique de Strasbourg. The buildings were not yet complete when a group of four women and six men gathered for the school's first class.

After three years of study, Pomarat joined the permanent troupe at the National Theatre of Strasbourg in 1957 after being hired by Hubert Gignoux. Here, he acted in more than thirty plays. He also directed three shows and taught nearly 150 students during his time as a professor at the theatre's school.

In 1974, Pomarat created the Maison des Arts et Loisirs (MAL) with support from Strasbourg Mayor Pierre Pflimlin and his cultural assistant Germain Muller. Pomarat allowed artistic exhibitions outside his theatre, with storytellers, circuses, and street theatres. He founded the Festival des Giboulées de la Marionnette in 1976, a festival of puppetry. In 1981, he established Compagnie du Théâtre du Jeune Public (TJP), combining it with the Maison des Arts et Loisirs, forming the MAL-TJP.

In 1985, Pomarat and François Lazaro created a play based on Le Légende des siècles by Victor Hugo. The show won three awards at the Festival Off d'Avignon. He directed multiple shows at the MAL-TJP, such as Un pantalon pour mon ânon (1977), Lorette (1981), and L'Île des esclaves (1984). On his directing career, Pomarat stated "And then, I think I was running away from the staging. I had a fear, the fear of not succeeding, of bringing nothing ... You know, I am above all an actor. I like to deliver myself, in the hands of a director!".

After imploring the Mayor of Strasbourg in 1978, the TJP was certified by the National Dramatic Center for Children and Youth (CDNEJ), after a notification from French Minister of Culture Jack Lang on 12 November 1990. Grégoire Callies replaced Pomarat at the TJP in 1997, and he once again became an actor.

Julie Brochen, director of the National Theatre of Strasbourg from 2008 to 2014, cast Pomarat in several roles in The Cherry Orchard, Don Juan, Liquidation, and Pulcinella.

=== Private life ===
Pomarat married Jacqueline Worms with whom he had three children: Sophie (born 1957), Simon (1959), and Virginie (born 1961). He died on 30 April 2020 in Strasbourg at the age of 89.

== Distinctions ==
- Knight of the Legion of Honour (8 April 1998)
- Commander of the Ordre des Arts et des Lettres (28 May 1997)

On 6 April 2009, the hall of the TJP Centre dramatique national Strasbourg Grand Est was named after Pomarat.

== Filmography ==
=== Cinema ===
- Mado, Hold for Pick Up (1990)
- L'Inconnu de Strasbourg (1998)

=== Television ===
- Flaubertine (1973)
- Tatort (1975)
- Le Pèlerinage (1975)
- Les samedis de l'histoire (1977)
- Portrait d'un inconnu (1981)
- Le 28 mars, 20 heures... (1981)
- Maître Daniel Rock (1981)
- Le Rescousee (1982)
- Les beaux quartiers (1983)
- Le crime de la maison Grün (1984)
- Carmilla: Le coeur pétrifié (1988)
- Les Alsaciens ou les Deux Mathilde (1996)
