= 2005–06 Clermont Foot season =

Clermont Foot
2005–06 season
- Head coach: Marc Collat
- Stadium: Stade Gabriel Montpied
- Ligue 2: 18th (relegated)
- Coupe de France: Eighth round
- Coupe de la Ligue: Second round
- Top goalscorer: League: Frédéric Fouret (13); All: Frédéric Fouret (13)
- Biggest defeat: Bastia 4–0 Clermont

The 2005–06 Clermont Foot season was the club's 94th season in existence and the club's fourth consecutive season in the second division of French football. In addition to the domestic league, Clermont participated in this season's edition of the Coupe de France and Coupe de la Ligue. The season covered the period from 1 July 2005 to 30 June 2006.

== Pre-season and friendlies ==
Win Draw Loss

== Competitions ==
=== Overview ===
Competition	First match	Last match	Starting round	Final position	Record							
Competition	First match	Last match	Starting round	Final position	Pld	W	D	L	GF	GA	GD	Win %
Ligue 2	29 July 2005	12 May 2006	Matchday 1	18th	38	10	8	20	35	59	−24	26.32
Coupe de France	21 November 2005	9 December 2005	Seventh round	Eighth round	2	1	0	1	3	4	−1	50.00
Coupe de la Ligue	20 September 2005	26 October 2005	First round	Second round	2	1	0	1	3	3	+0	50.00
Total					42	12	8	22	41	66	−25	28.57

Source: Competitions

=== Ligue 2 ===
==== League table ====
Pos	Team	Pld	W	D	L	GF	GA	GD	Pts	Promotion or Relegation
16	Amiens	38	9	16	13	32	44	−12	43	
17	Brest	38	9	15	14	34	48	−14	42	
18	Clermont (R)	38	10	8	20	35	59	−24	38	Relegation to Championnat National [fr]
19	Laval (R)	38	9	8	21	38	59	−21	35	Relegation to Championnat National [fr]
20	Sète (R)	38	4	11	23	31	60	−29	23	Relegation to Championnat National [fr]

Source: Ligue 2
(R) Relegated

==== Results summary ====
Overall								Home						Away					
Pld	W	D	L	GF	GA	GD	Pts	W	D	L	GF	GA	GD	W	D	L	GF	GA	GD
38	10	8	20	35	59	−24	38	8	4	7	19	20	−1	2	4	13	16	39	−23

==== Results by round ====
Round	1	2	3	4	5	6	7	8	9	10	11	12	13	14	15	16	17	18	19	20	21	22	23	24	25	26	27	28	29	30	31	32	33	34	35	36	37	38
Ground	H	A	H	A	H	A	H	A	H	A	H	A	H	A	H	A	H	A	H	H	A	H	A	H	A	H	A	H	A	H	A	H	A	H	A	H	A	A
Result	D	D	W	L	W	L	L	L	D	D	W	L	L	D	W	L	L	L	W	D	L	L	D	L	W	W	L	W	L	L	L	L	L	D	L	W	L	W
Position	13	13	16	16	14	16	18	18	19	20	20	20	20	20	18	19	19	19	19	19	19	19	19	19	19	18	19	18	19	19	19	19	19	19	19	19	19	18

A = Away; H = Home; W = Win; D = Draw; L = Loss

==== Matches ====
29 July 2005 1	Clermont	0–0	Sète	Clermont
CET (UTC+1)				Stadium: Stade Gabriel Montpied

8 August 2005 2	Dijon	1–1	Clermont	Clermont
CET (UTC+1)				Stadium: Stade Gaston Gérard

12 August 2005 3	Clermont	1–0	Sedan	Clermont
CET (UTC+1)				Stadium: Stade Gabriel Montpied

16 August 2005 4	Gueugnon	2–0	Clermont	Gueugnon
CET (UTC+1)

19 August 2005 5	Clermont	1–0	Istres	Clermont
CET (UTC+1)				Stadium: Stade Gabriel Montpied

26 August 2005 6	Brest	2–0	Clermont	Brest
CET (UTC+1)

9 September 2005 7	Clermont	0–3	Lorient	Clermont
CET (UTC+1)				Stadium: Stade Gabriel Montpied

16 September 2005 8	Bastia	4–0	Clermont	Furiani
CET (UTC+1)

23 September 2005 9	Clermont	2–2	Le Havre	Clermont
CET (UTC+1)				Stadium: Stade Gabriel Montpied

30 September 2005 10	Amiens	0–0	Clermont	Amiens
CET (UTC+1)

7 October 2005 11	Clermont	1–0	Grenoble	Clermont
CET (UTC+1)				Stadium: Stade Gabriel Montpied

14 October 2005 12	Valenciennes	3–0	Clermont	Valenciennes
CET (UTC+1)

21 October 2005 13	Clermont	0–3	Caen	Clermont
CET (UTC+1)				Stadium: Stade Gabriel Montpied

29 October 2005 14	Châteauroux	3–3	Clermont	Châteauroux
CET (UTC+1)

4 November 2005 15	Clermont	2–0	Créteil	Clermont
CET (UTC+1)				Stadium: Stade Gabriel Montpied

11 November 2005 16	Reims	4–1	Clermont	Reims
CET (UTC+1)

25 November 2005 17	Clermont	0–1	Montpellier	Clermont
CET (UTC+1)				Stadium: Stade Gabriel Montpied

2 December 2005 18	Guingamp	3–1	Clermont	Guingamp
CET (UTC+1)

16 December 2005 19	Clermont	1–0	Laval	Clermont
CET (UTC+1)				Stadium: Stade Gabriel Montpied

3 January 2006 20	Clermont	3–3	Dijon	Clermont
CET (UTC+1)				Stadium: Stade Gabriel Montpied

9 January 2006 21	Sedan	3–0	Clermont	Sedan
CET (UTC+1)

13 January 2006 22	Clermont	0–1	Gueugnon	Clermont
CET (UTC+1)				Stadium: Stade Gabriel Montpied

20 January 2006 23	Istres	1–1	Clermont	Istres
CET (UTC+1)

3 February 2006 24	Clermont	0–1	Brest	Clermont
CET (UTC+1)				Stadium: Stade Gabriel Montpied

10 February 2006 25	Lorient	0–2	Clermont	Lorient
CET (UTC+1)

17 February 2006 26	Clermont	2–0	Bastia	Clermont
CET (UTC+1)				Stadium: Stade Gabriel Montpied

24 February 2006 27	Le Havre	2–1	Clermont	Le Havre
CET (UTC+1)

4 March 2006 28	Clermont	2–0	Amiens	Clermont
CET (UTC+1)				Stadium: Stade Gabriel Montpied

10 March 2006 29	Grenoble	2–0	Clermont	Grenoble
CET (UTC+1)

17 March 2006 30	Clermont	1–2	Valenciennes	Clermont
CET (UTC+1)				Stadium: Stade Gabriel Montpied

24 March 2006 31	Caen	2–1	Clermont	Caen
CET (UTC+1)

31 March 2006 32	Clermont	0–2	Châteauroux	Clermont
CET (UTC+1)				Stadium: Stade Gabriel Montpied

7 April 2006 33	Créteil	3–1	Clermont	Créteil
CEST (UTC+2)

14 April 2006 34	Clermont	0–0	Reims	Clermont
CEST (UTC+2)				Stadium: Stade Gabriel Montpied

21 April 2006 35	Montpellier	1–0	Clermont	Montpellier
CEST (UTC+2)

28 April 2006 36	Clermont	3–2	Guingamp	Clermont
CEST (UTC+2)				Stadium: Stade Gabriel Montpied

5 May 2006 37	Laval	2–1	Clermont	Laval
CEST (UTC+2)

12 May 2006 38	Sète	1–3	Clermont	Sète
CEST (UTC+2)

=== Coupe de France ===
21 November 2005 Seventh round	FC Bassin d'Arcachon	1–2	Clermont	Arcachon
CET (UTC+1)				Stadium: Stade Jean Brousse; Attendance: 1,500

9 December 2005 Eighth round	Dijon	3–1	Clermont	Dijon
CET (UTC+1)				Stadium: Stade Gaston Gérard

=== Coupe de la Ligue ===
20 September 2005 First round	Clermont	2–1	Istres	Clermont
CEST (UTC+2)				Stadium: Stade Gabriel Montpied

26 October 2005 Second round	Le Mans FC	2–1	Clermont	Le Mans
CEST (UTC+2)

== Statistics ==
=== Goalscorers ===
Rank	Pos	No.	Nat	Name	Ligue 2	Coupe de France	Coupe de la Ligue	Total
	FW		(France)	Frédéric Fouret	13	0	0	13
	FW		(Angola)	Titi	8	0	0	8
	FW		(France)	Antoine Grauss	3	0	0	3
	FW		(France)	Jordan Lotiès	3	0	0	3
Totals					0	0	0	0
