= Redslob =

Redslob is a surname. Notable people with the surname include:

- Robert Redslob (1882–1962), German-French constitutional and public international law-scientist
- Edwin Redslob (1884–1973), German art historian, publisher and university scholar
