= Mougin =

Mougin is a surname. Notable people with the surname include:

- Eugène Mougin (1852–1923), French archer
- Henri-Louis-Philippe Mougin (1841–1916), French military engineer
- Nicolas Mougin (born 1979), French vert skater
- Mougin brothers, French sculptors and ceramists

== See also ==
- Mougin turret, a French gun turret
- Mougins, a commune in Alpes-Maritimes, France
