= Robert Kuven =

German painter

Robert Kuven (21 August 1901, Strasbourg – 25 April 1983, Strasbourg) was a German/French painter and watercolorist.

== Biography ==
From childhood, Robert Kuven was fond of drawing, but his parents considered a career as an artist as risky. Initially he trained as an architect at the Ecole Nationale Technique d’Architecture de Strasbourg and then worked as an architect until 1926. He continued to draw and paint and made copies of great masters.

He then attended the School of Decorative Arts in Cologne and then from 1927 to 1930 studied in Munich. Soon he moved to Paris and attended the Académie Julian, then continued studies in Germany. He returned to Strasbourg in 1932 and taught drawing at the École supérieure des arts décoratifs de Strasbourg. Throughout this period he made several trips to other European countries. He stayed in Florence, Switzerland, Austria, the Netherlands and Spain. He also went to England to study Turner.

He taught in Strasbourg until the War in 1939. In 1945 he returned and taught at the Lycée Kléber. In 1975, at the age of 74, he went travelling in Norway and the Nordic countries.

== Personal life ==
In 1932 he married Madeleine Simon. They had a daughter, Elisabeth. After a short illness, Robert Kuven died 23 April 1983. He is buried in the West Cemetery in Strasbourg. The catholic priest Carl Küven (until 1944 Strasbourg-Ostwald, later on Stuttgart) most probably was his brother.

== Honours ==
The Square Robert Kuven in Strasbourg is named in his honour.

== Works ==
=== Book illustrations ===
- Kuven, Robert (1935). Der Kreuzweg Christi. Bilder Von Küven, Robert. Begleitworte: Schwester Maria.
- Kuven, Robert (1949). Vues d'Alsace. Lithographies originales coloriées à la main.
- Lefftz, Joseph; Kuven, Robert (1954). Die Brunnen im Elsass.
- Barth, Médard; Kuven, Robert; Solveen, Henri (1958). Der Rebbau des Elsass und die Absatzgebiete seiner Weine : ein geschichtlicher Durchblick.
- Redslob, Robert; Kuven, Robert (1962). Ce que raconte l'Alsace.
- Straub, Karl Willy (1966). Erinnerungen an das Elsaß. Ein Zeitdokument (Mit einem Geleitwort von Paul Bertololy und acht Handzeichnungen von Robert Küven).
- Sättele, Karl (1968). Schnurren und seltsame Käuze vom Bodensee Mit Federzeichnungen von Robert Küven.
- Kuven, Robert (1970). Mont Sainte Odile. Aquarelles de R. Kuven, Strasbourg.
- Matzen, Raymond; Kuven, Robert (1976). Récits légendaires d'Alsace.
- Matzen, Raymond; Kuven, Robert (1977). Lithographies d'Alsace : méditations poétiques d'un aquarelliste alsacien, gerbes de poésies du Terroir.
- Zink, Georges; Matzen, Raymond; Gachet, Gérard; Kuven, Robert (1978). Sichelte = Moisson : poésies sundgoviennes.
- Kuven, Robert (1979). Dessins et aquarelles.
- Matzen, Raymond; Zink, Georges; Kuven, Robert (1980). Dichte isch bichte : Gedichte in Strassburger Mundart.

=== Watercolours ===
- Betschdorf
- Jardins
- La cour du cloître
- La terrasse
- La porte de Darstein
- L'auberge du Kochersberg
- Ostwald
- Paysage de mine
- Paysage des Vosges
- Paysage et église
- Paysage et maisons
- Uttwiller
- Niederaltdorf
- Ottrot

=== Oils ===
- Bouquet de fleurs
- Jardin de l'Orangerie
- Ferme alsacienne en pays de Hanau
- Paysage
- Paysage des Vosges
- Portrait de femme

== Bibliography ==
- François Joseph Fuchs, "Robert Kuven", in Nouveau Dictionnaire de biographie alsacienne, Vol. 22, p. 2161
- Alsace collections with self-portrait and full early biography
- DNA = Dernières Nouvelles D'alsace, 1 August 2010 with portrait
