= Jakob Twinger von Königshofen =

German historian

Jacob Königshofen (more properly Jakob Twinger von Königshofen) (1346 – 27 December 1420) was a German chronicler.

== Biography ==
Jacob was born at Königshofen, then a village near, and now a district of, Strasburg, in Alsace, but only a few details of his life are known. He became a priest in 1382, and for a time he held the parish of Drusenheim. In 1394 he became notary Apostolic and in 1395 a canon of St. Thomas at Strasburg, where he was placed in charge of the archives and kept the stock books and registers.

Early in life, he had devoted himself to historical studies, and a Latin "Chronicle" is extant, written by him before he became a priest (edited by Louis Duchesne in Mitteilungen der Gesellschaft für die Erhaltung der geschichtlichen Denkmäler im Elsass, second series, IV). This work only contains extracts from different authors and is in consequence a mere collection of historical matter.

His principal work is the Chronik. He began it in 1382; he twice revised it and brought it down to the year 1415. One of the first universal histories in German prose, it includes also a territorial history of Alsace and a local history of Strasbourg. Recognizing the needs of his time, he wrote it for the Klugen, that is, cultivated, laymen, "who read such things as eagerly as learned parsons". His narrative is therefore popular and enlivened by legends, jokes, and details concerning the lives of the people. He possessed a good knowledge and availed himself freely of the sources of medieval prose and poetry (particularly Ekkehard, but also Eusebius, Bede, Hermannus Contractus, Martinus Polonus, and others).

In politics, he was an adherent of Louis the Bavarian, an imperialist and German nationalist. Influenced by the Alsatian chronicler Fritsche Closener, he has himself been in many cases the authority for later historians. The last chapter of the Chronik contains an alphabetical list of historical events with dates, and forms thus a kind of compendium of history, and was often copied separately. The Chronik was printed as early as 1474, and later at Strasbourg in 1698. A scholarly edition is that of Hegel in Chroniken der deutschen Städte, VIII-IX (Leipzig, 1870-1871). Jacob died at Strasbourg, in his seventies.

Königshofen also authored a Latin-German glossary, which may, however, in its essential details be traced to Closener.
