= Benjamin-Constant Martha =

19th-century French moralist and historian

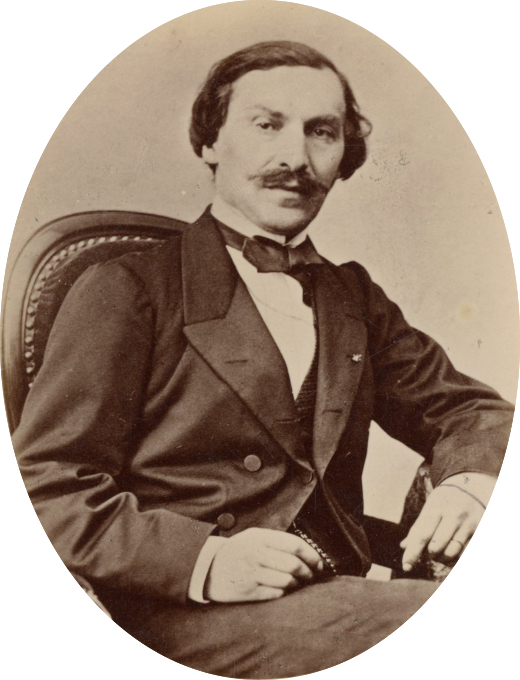
- Born: 1820; Strasbourg
- Died: 1895 (aged 74–75)
- Occupation: Historian

Benjamin-Constant Martha, also known under the name Constant Martha, (1820–1895) was a 19th-century French moralist and historian of ancient morality.

A graduate of the École normale supérieure, agrégé de lettres and docteur ès lettres, he was professor of literature at the lycée de Strasbourg, then held the chair of Latin eloquence at the Sorbonne and professor at the Collège de France. He was elected a member of the Académie des sciences morales et politiques in 1872.

He was Jules Martha's father and Paul Girard's stepfather.

== Publications ==
- 1854: De la Morale pratique dans les lettres de Sénèque (thesis) online
- 1854: Dionis philosophantis effigies (thèse complémentaire en latin)
- 1854: De la Morale pratique dans les lettres de Sénèque
- 1865: Les Moralistes sous l'Empire romain, philosophes et poètes

Includes La morale pratique dans les lettres de Sénèque. Un Poète stoïcien - Persia. La Vertu stoïque - Epictetus. L'Examen de conscience d'un empereur romain - Marcus Aurelius. La Prédication morale populaire - Dio Chrysostom. La Société romaine - Juvenal. Le Scepticisme religieux et philosophique - Lucian.

- 1866: Les Sophistes grecs dans l’Empire romain
- 1869: Le Poème de Lucrèce : morale, religion, science Read online
- 1883: Études morales sur l'antiquité. Includes: L'Éloge funèbre chez les Romains. Le Philosophe Carneades à Rome. Les Consolations dans l'Antiquité. L'Examen de conscience chez les anciens. Un Chrétien devenu paĭen. Un Paĭen devenu chrétien.
- 1884: La Délicatesse dans l'art
- 1896: Mélanges de littérature ancienne Incledes: L'Éducation des femmes grecques. Pindar. Les Romains à la comédie. Cicero and Lucretius. Augustus et les lettres. Sénèque.

== Bibliography ==
- Paul Janet, Notice sur Benjamin-Constant Martha, Cerf, Versailles, 1895, 16 p., Gallica
- Jean-Yves Mariotte, « Benjamin Constant Martha », in Nouveau Dictionnaire de biographie alsacienne, vol. 25, (p. 2533)
