= Adolphe Stoeber =

French ecclesiastic, poet, and writer

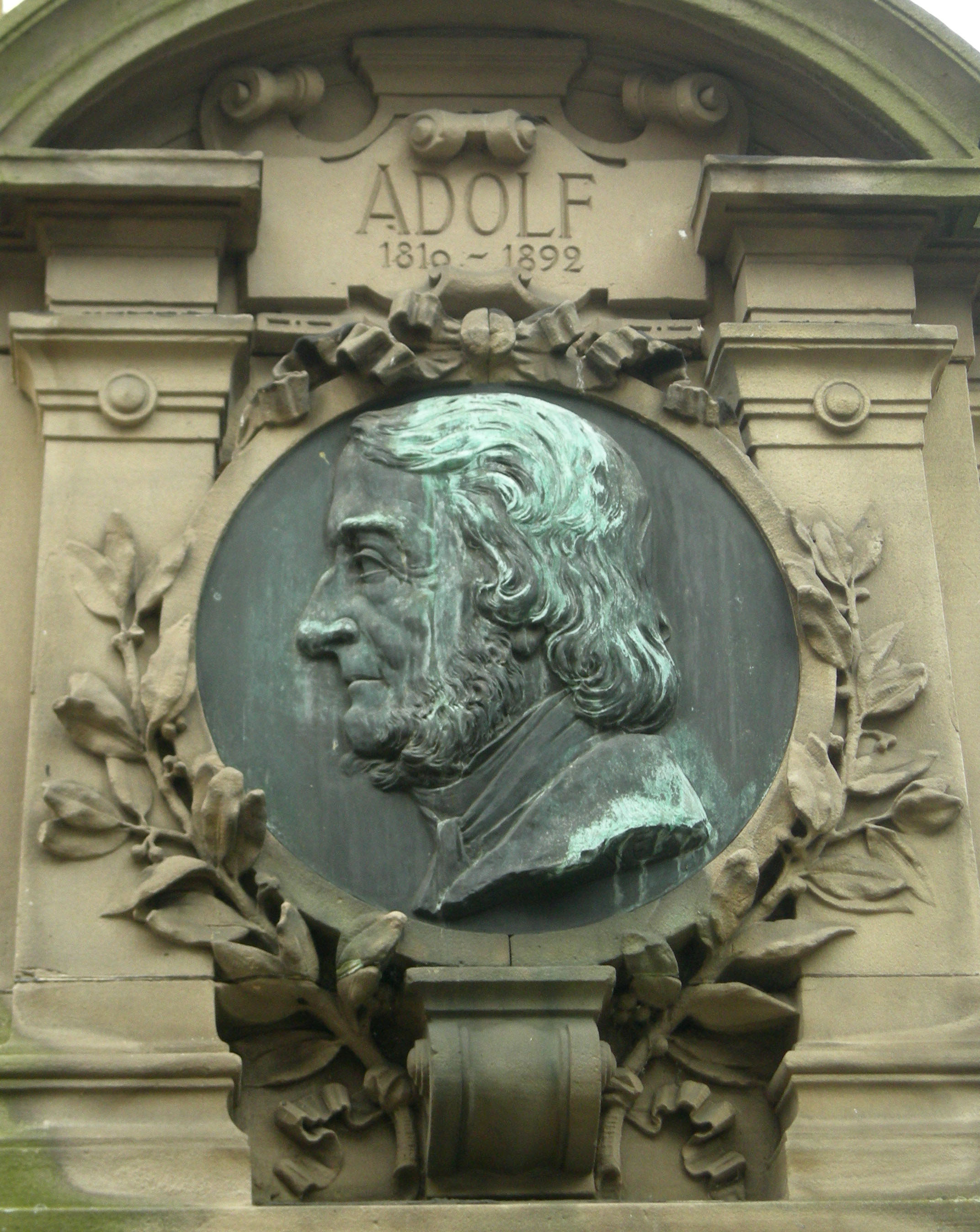
Monument of the Stoebers

Adolphe Stoeber, or Adolf Stöber (Strasbourg, 1810 – Mulhouse, 1892), was a French ecclesiastic, poet, and writer in German language from Alsace.

He was the son of Ehrenfried Stoeber and Auguste Stoeber's brother. He studied theology and was a Protestant priest in Metz (1832), Oberbronn (1836) and Mulhouse, where he was president at the Reformist Assembly.

In 1838, he founded the publication Erwinia with his brother. This magazine dealt with Alsatian and Swiss legends in Alsatian.

== Works ==
- Alsatisches Vergißmeinnicht (1825)
- Alsa-Bilder (1836)
- Reisebilder aus der Schweiz (1850)
- Elsässer Schatzkästel (1877)
- Epheukranz auf das Grabmal einer Heimgegangenen (1884)
- Spiegel deutscher Frauen (1892)
