= Alsatian dialect =

Alemannic German dialect spoken in Alsace

Alsatian
- Elsässisch, Elsässerditsch
- Native to: France
- Region: Alsace
- Native speakers: 900,000 (2013)
- Language family: Indo-European: Germanic; West Germanic; High German; Upper German; Alemannic German; Low Alemannic German; Upper Rhenish; Alsatian

Official status
- Recognised minority language in: France
- Regulated by: No official regulation Officially promoted through the 'Office pour la Langue et les Cultures d’Alsace et de Moselle (OLCA)' (Office for the language and cultures of Alsace and Moselle), funded by the Grand Est region (formerly the Alsace region), and the departmental councils of Bas-Rhin and Haut-Rhin.

Language codes
- ISO 639-2: gsw
- ISO 639-3: gsw (with Swiss German)
- Glottolog: swis1247 Central Alemannic
- IETF: gsw-FR
- Linguistic map of Alsace

Alsatian (Alsatian: Elsässisch or Elsässerditsch "Alsatian German"; Lorraine Franconian: Elsässerdeitsch; French: Alsacien; German: Elsässisch or Elsässerdeutsch) is the group of Alemannic German and Franconian dialects spoken in most of Alsace, a formerly disputed region in eastern France that has passed between French and German control five times since 1681.

== Language family ==
Alsatian is closely related to other nearby Alemannic dialects, such as Swiss German, Swabian, Markgräflerisch, Kaiserstühlerisch and the other Alemannic dialects of Baden. It is often confused with Lorraine Franconian, a more distantly related Franconian dialect spoken in the northwest corner of Alsace and in neighbouring Lorraine. Like other dialects and languages, Alsatian has also been influenced by outside sources. Words of Yiddish origin can be found in Alsatian, and modern conversational Alsatian includes adaptations of French words and English words, especially concerning new technologies.

=== Status of Alsatian in France ===
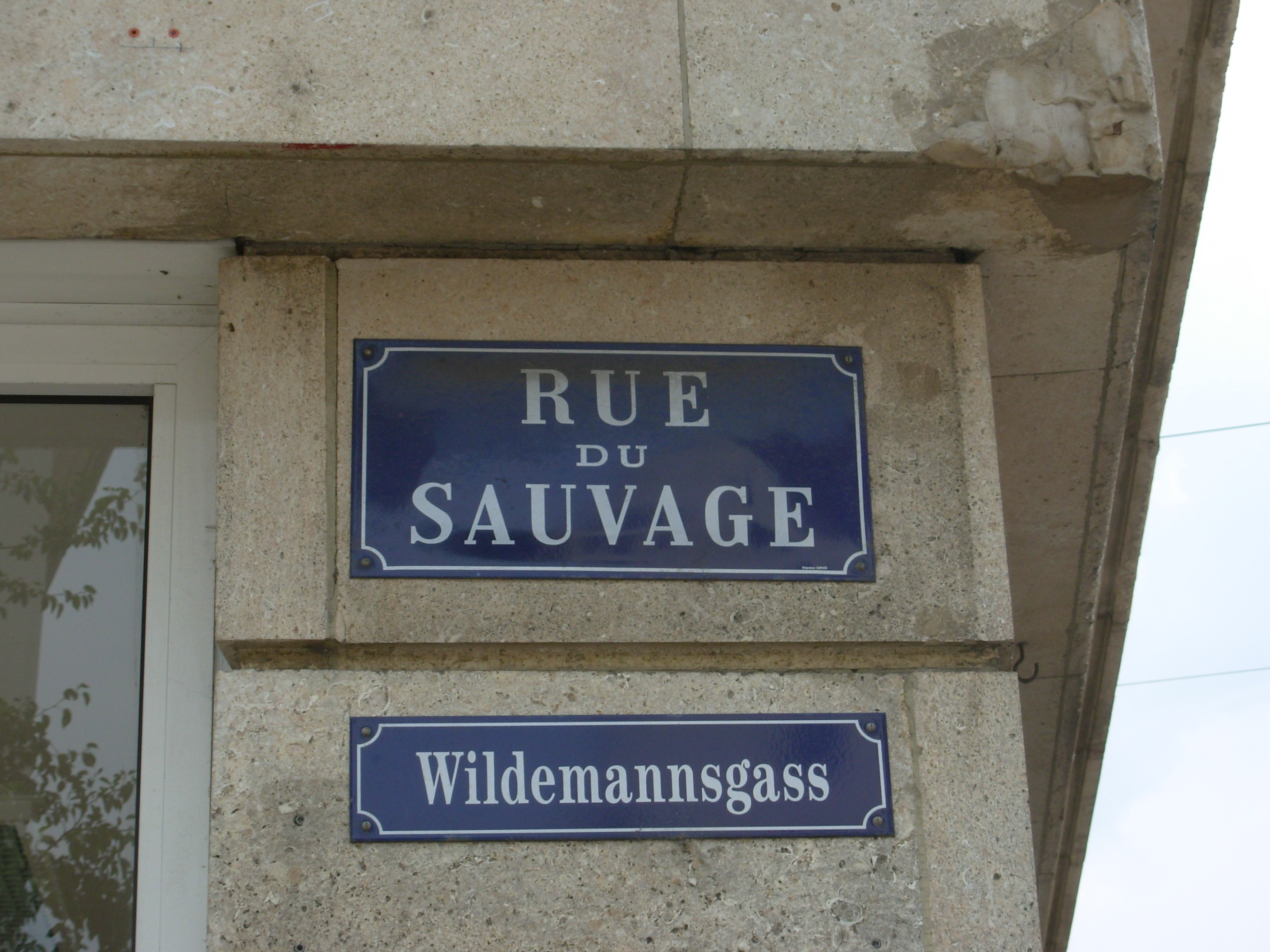
A bilingual (French and Alsatian) sign in Mulhouse

An Alsatian dialect speaker

Since 1992, the constitution of the Fifth Republic states that French is the official language of the Republic. However, Alsatian, along with other regional languages, is recognized by the French government in the official list of languages of France. France is a signatory to the European Charter for Regional or Minority Languages but has never ratified the law and has not given regional languages the support that would be required by the charter.

Alsatian has gone from being the prevalent language of the region to one in decline. A 1999 INSEE survey counted 548,000 adult speakers of Alsatian in France, making it the second-most-spoken regional language in the country (after Occitan). Like all regional languages in France, however, the transmission of Alsatian is declining. While 43% of the adult population of Alsace speaks Alsatian, its use has been largely declining amongst the youngest generations.

In 2023 local French public schools began offering Alsatian immersion for the first time. The programs have proven popular with students and parents, but after years of official state suppression of the language, struggle to find enough teachers.

A dialect of Alsatian German is spoken in the United States by a group known as the Swiss Amish, whose ancestors emigrated there in the middle of the 19th century. The approximately 7,000 speakers are located mainly in Allen County, Indiana, with "daughter settlements"^{[Note 1]} elsewhere.

== Orthography ==
Majuscule forms	A	B	C	D	E	F	G	H	I	J	K	L	M	N	O	P	Q	R	S	T	U	V	W	X	Y	Z	Ä	À	Ë	É	È	Ì	Ö	Ü	Ù
Minuscule forms	a	b	c	d	e	f	g	h	i	j	k	l	m	n	o	p	q	r	s	t	u	v	w	x	y	z	ä	à	ë	é	è	ì	ö	ü	ù
IPA	/a/, /ə/	/b̥/	/k/, /ɡ̊/	/d̥/	/e/, /eː/, /ə/	/f/	/ɡ̊/	/h/	/i/	/j/	/k/	/l/	/m/	/n/, /ŋ/	/o/	/p/	/k/	/ʁ/, /ʁ̞/, /ʀ/	/s/	/t/	/u/	/v/, /f/	/ʋ/, /v/	/ks/	/ʏ/, /yː/, /ɪ/, /iː/	/z/	/ɛ/	/ɑ/, /ɑː/	/æ/	/e/	/ɛ/	/ɪ/	/ø/	/y/	/ʊ/

C, Q, and X are only used in loanwords. Y is also used in native words, but is more common in loanwords.

=== Orthal ===
Orthal (Orthographe alsacienne) is a revised orthography meant for use by all dialects of Alsatian promoted by the Office pour la Langue et les Cultures d'Alsace et de Moselle (OLCA).

The latest version (2016) of Orthal is described below. Not all dialects are expected to use all letters & diacritics. For example, Owerlandisch from Southern Alsace primarily uses the additional vowel letters, Ä À Ì Ü.

Dialects from the north (Strasbourg region) make use of more letters including Ë, Ö, Ù and the diphthong ÈI.

In general the principles of Orthal are to:

1. Follow standard German orthography for the regular vowels A, E, I, O, U and their umlauted Standard German forms Ä, Ö, Ü
2. For diphthongs & triphthongs that do not exist in Standard German Orthal combines standard German letters to create anew – e.g., ia, üe (or üa), öi, àui, äi (or èi)
3. For vowel sounds not represented in the Standard German orthography, it uses the French acute & grave accent marks to create new graphemes that can represent sounds unique to the Alsatian dialects
4. It also follows standard German orthography for consonants as well.

The vowels are pronounced short or long based on their position in the syllable besides the letter type.

A vowel at the end of a syllable, without a subsequent consonant, is a long vowel "V" = Long Vowel (LV). e.g., hà, sì

A vowel followed by a single consonant in a syllable is pronounced as a long vowel "V + C" = Long Vowel (LV). e.g., Ros

Note – A vowel followed by several consonants ("V + C + C") in a syllable is pronounced as a Short Vowel. e.g., Ross

==== Monophthong – short vowels ====
Majuscule forms	A	Ä	À	E	É	È	Ë	I	Ì	O	Ö	U	Ü	Ù
Minuscule forms	a	ä	à	e	é	è	ë	i	ì	o	ö	u	ü	ù
IPA	/a/	/ɛ/	/ɑ ~ ɒ/	/e/, /ə/	/e/	/ɛ/	/æ/	/i/	/ɪ/	/o/	/ø/	/u/	/y/	/ʊ/

==== Monophthong – long vowels ====
Majuscule forms	A , AH, AA	À , ÀH, ÀÀ	Ä , ÄH	E , EH, EE	Ë , ËH	È , ÈÈ ÈH	I , II, IH	Ì , ÌH	O , OO, OH	Ö ,	U , UU, UH	Ü ,ÜÜ, ÜH	Ù , ÙÙ, ÙH	Œ	UE
IPA	/aː/	/ɒː/	/ɛː/	/eː/	/æː/	/ɛː/	/iː/	/ɪː/	/oː/	/øː/	/uː/	/yː/	/ʊː/	/œː/	/ʏ/

== Phonology ==
=== Consonants ===
Alsatian has a set of 19 consonants:

	Labial	Alveolar	Postalveolar	Palatal	Velar	Uvular	Glottal
Nasal	m	n			ŋ		
Stop	b̥	d̥			ɡ̊ kʰ		
Affricate	pf	ts	tʃ				
Fricative	f v	s	ʃ	ç	(x)	ʁ	h
Approximant	ʋ	l		j		ʁ	

Three consonants are restricted in their distribution: /kʰ/ and /h/ only occur at the beginning of a word or morpheme, and then only if followed immediately by a vowel; /ŋ/ never occurs at the beginning of a word or morpheme.

Alsatian, like some German dialects, has lenited all obstruents but [k]. Its lenes are, however, voiceless as in all Southern German varieties. Therefore, they are here transcribed /b̥/, /d̥/, /ɡ̊/. Speakers of French tend to hear them as their /p, t, k/, which also are voiceless and unaspirated.

The phoneme /ç/ has a velar allophone [x] after back vowels (/u/, /o/, /ɔ/, and /a/ in those speakers who do not pronounce this as [æ]), and palatal [ç] elsewhere. In southern dialects, there is a tendency to pronounce it /x/ in all positions, and in Strasbourg the palatal allophone tends to conflate with the phoneme /ʃ/. A labiodental voiced fricative /v/ sound is also present as well as an approximant /ʋ/ sound. /ʁ/ may have phonetic realizations as [ʁ], [ʁ̞], and [ʀ].

=== Vowels ===
	Front		Central	Back
Close	i	y		u
Near-close	ɪ	ʏ		ʊ
Close-mid	e	ø	(ə)	o
Open-mid	ɛ	œ		ɔ
Open	æ		a	ɑ~ɒ

Short vowels: /ʊ/, /o/, /ɒ/, /a/ ([æ] in Strasbourg), /ɛ/, /ɪ/, /i/, /y/.

Long vowels: /ʊː/, /oː/, /ɒː/, /aː/, /ɛː/, /eː/, /iː/, /yː/

== Grammar ==
Alsatian nouns inflect by case, gender and number:

- Three cases: nominative, accusative, dative. Unlike Standard German, Alsatian does not have a genitive case and instead utilises the dative or the preposition vu ("of", German "von") plus the dative to fulfill that role in certain cases.
- Three genders: masculine, feminine and neuter.
- Two numbers: singular and plural.

== Comparative vocabulary list ==
English	Southern Alsatian (Haut-Rhin)	Northern Alsatian (Bas-Rhin)	High Alemannic (Swiss German)	Standard German	Swabian German	Luxembourgish	Pennsylvania German	Standard French
house	's Hüss	s' Hüs	Huus	Haus	Hous	Haus	Haus	maison
loud	lütt	lüt	luut	laut	lout	haart	laut	bruyant
people	d' Litt	d' Lit	Lüt	Leute	Leid	Leit	Leit	gens/peuple
today	hìtt	hit	hüt	heute	heid	haut	heit	aujourd'hui
beautiful	scheen	scheen	schö(n)	schön	sche	schéin	schee	beau
Earth	d' Arda	d' Erd	Ärd(e)	Erde	Erd	Äerd	Erd	terre
Fog	d'r Nawel	de Näwwel	Näbel	Nebel	Nebl	Niwwel	Newwel	brouillard
water	's Wàsser	's Wàsser	Wasser	Wasser	Wasser	Waasser	Wasser	eau
man	d'r Mànn	de Mànn	Maa	Mann	Mà	Mann	Mann	homme
to eat	assa	esse	ässe	essen	essa	iessen	esse	manger
to drink	trìnka	trinke	trinkche	trinken	trenka	drénken	drinke	boire
little	klei	klein/klaan/klëën	chl(e)i	klein	kloi	kleng	glee	petit, petite
child	's Kìnd	's Kind	Chind	Kind	Kind	Kand	Kind	enfant
day	d'r Tàg	de Dàà	Dag	Tag	Dàg	Dag	Daag	jour
woman	d' Fràui	d' Frau	Frou/Frau	Frau	Frau	Fra	Fraa	femme

== Sample text ==
Article 1 of the Universal Declaration of Human Rights in Alsatian:

Àlli Mensche kùmme mìt de gliche Wìrde ùn Rachte ùff d’Walt. Sie hàn àlli Vernùnft ùn Gewìsse ùn selle mìt Brìederlichkeit de àndere gejjenìwwer hàndle.

Article 1 of the Universal Declaration of Human Rights in English:

All human beings are born free and equal in dignity and rights. They are endowed with reason and conscience and should act towards one another in a spirit of brotherhood.

== See also ==
- Adolphe Stoeber

== Notes ==
1. When Amish communities become too big, a number of families move away and form a new settlement, which is referred to as a daughter settlement. The settlement from which they leave is the mother settlement.

== Sources ==
- Marthe Philipp and Arlette Bothorel-Witz. 1990. Low Alemannic. In Charles V. J. Russ (ed.), The Dialects of modern German: a linguistic survey, 313–336. Routledge.
- (in French) François Héran, et al. (2002) "La Dynamique des langues en France au fil du XX^{e} siècle". Population et sociétés 376, Ined.
- (in French) Le système ORTHAL 2016 – Orthographe alsacienne - Quelques règles de base pour faciliter l’écriture et la lecture de l’alsacien dans toutes ses variantes », Jérôme Do Bentzinger, 2016
- (in French) "L'Alsacien, deuxième langue régionale de France" (PDF). Chiffres pour l'Alsace. INSEE. December 2002.
- (in French) Brunner, Jean-Jacques. L'Alsacien sans peine. ASSiMiL, 2001. ISBN 2-7005-0222-1
- (in French) Jung, Edmond. Grammaire de L'Alsacien. Dialecte de Strasbourg avec indications historiques. 1983. Straßburg: Ed. Oberlin.
- (in French) Laugel-Erny, Elsa. Cours d'alsacien. Les Editions du Quai, 1999.
- (in French) Matzen, Raymond, and Léon Daul. Wie Geht's ? Le Dialecte à la portée de tous La Nuée Bleue, 1999. ISBN 2-7165-0464-4
- (in French) Matzen, Raymond, and Léon Daul. Wie Steht's ? Lexiques alsacien et français, Variantes dialectales, Grammaire La Nuée Bleue, 2000. ISBN 2-7165-0525-X
- (in French) Steible, Lucie. Le contrôle temporel des consonnes occlusives de l’alsacien et du français parlé en Alsace. Linguistique. Université de Strasbourg, 2014.
- (in French) Rünneburger, Henri. Dictionnaire alsacien-francais. 3 vols. Hamburg: Baar 2021 (100.000 lemmata).
- (in French) Rünneburger, Henri. Grammaire de l'alsacien. Hamburg: Baar 2023.
