= August Kayser =

- Born: 14 February 1821; Strasbourg
- Died: 17 June 1885 (aged 64)
- Occupation: Theologian, librarian, Protestant theologian
- Employer: University of Strasbourg

August Kayser (born Strasbourg, France; 14 February 1821 – 17 June 1885) was a Protestant theologian.

For some years, Kayser was an assistant librarian at the University of Strasbourg. He was a private tutor from 1843 to 1855, and accepted a call to be a preacher to Stossweiler in 1858. In 1868 Kayser went to Neuhof, Alsace. He was appointed professor of theology in Strasbourg in 1873.

Kayser belonged to the so-called liberal Protestants, and contributed largely to the Revue de Theologie. He published De Justini Martyris and Doctrina (Strasbourg, 1850), but his main work was Das Vorexilische Buch der Urgeschichte Israels und Seine Erweiterungen (1874).

This article incorporates public domain material from McClintock, John; Strong, James (1867–1887). Cyclopædia of Biblical, Theological and Ecclesiastical Literature. Harper and Brothers.
