= Jacques-Antoine Denoyé =

French composer and organist

Jacques-Antoine Denoyé (?–1759) was a French composer and organist in Strasbourg. He was a friend of the organ-maker Jean-André Sillbermann (1712-1783), Among his large scale works the only one to have been performed and recorded in the modern era is his Messe à Grand Choeur et Symphonie (1758) which bears stylistic resemblances to Rameau, and was performed and recorded live at Ambronay in 2007.
