= Jules Martha =

French archaeologist (1853–1932)

- Born: 8 January 1853; Strasbourg
- Died: 7 April 1932 (aged 79); Paris
- Occupation: Archaeologist

Joseph-Jules Martha (8 January 1853 – 7 April 1932) was a French scholar and archaeologist.

== Biography ==
He was the son of Benjamin-Constant Martha. He studied at the École normale supérieure from 1872 to 1875 and earned a docteur ès lettres. He was a member of the École française de Rome from 1875 to 1876, and of the French School at Athens from 1876 to 1879.

He became a maître de conférences at the faculté des lettres of Montpellier in 1879, at the faculté des lettres of Dijon in 1881, at the faculté des lettres of Lyon in 1882, at the faculté des lettres of Paris in 1884 and at the École normale supérieure

He was a member of the Société des Antiquaires de France.

== Publications ==
- 1880: Inscriptions doliarires latines: marques de briques relatives à une partie de la gens Domitia recueillies et classées
- 1880: Catalogue des figurines en terre cuite du Musée de la Société archéologique d'Athènes
- 1884: Manuel d'archéologie étrusque et romaine online
- 1889: L'Art étrusque
- 1891: La Fuite de Dédale, note sur une stèle étrusque à sujets mythologiques trouvée à Bologne
- 1892: Œuvres de Ciceron: Brutus. Texte latin. Revu et publié d'après les travaux les plus récents
- 1898: Pline le Jeune: Le Bonheur domestique de Pline le Jeune : Comment Pline le Jeune arrangeait sa vie : Sa Familia : Ses Sentiments religieux : Sa correspondance avec Trajan
- Des Termes extrêmes des biens et des maux: Livre I et II
- 1913: La Langue étrusque Listen online
