= Germain Muller =

French writer, actor, and politician

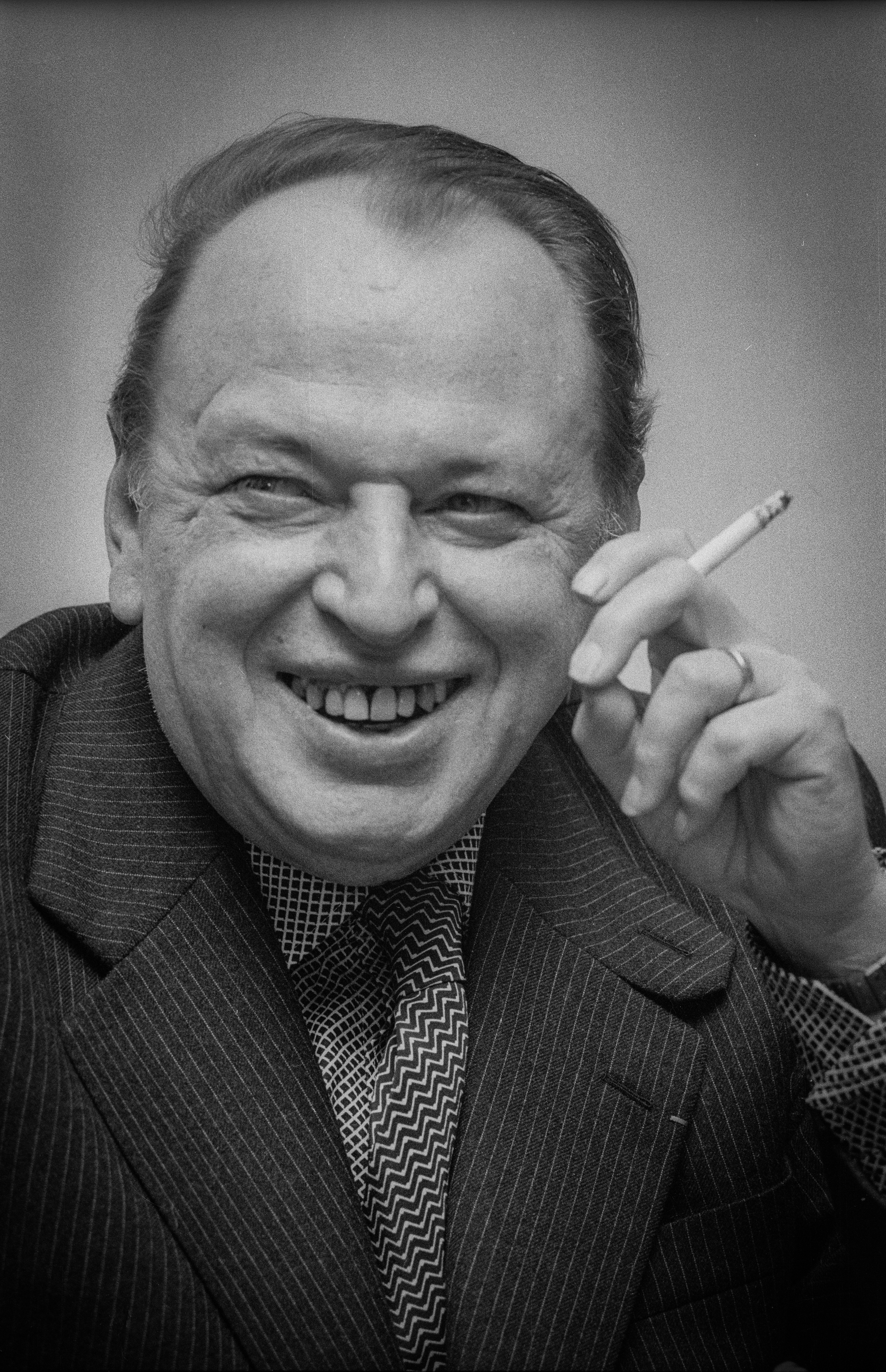
Germain Muller in 1980

Germain Muller (July 23, 1923 in Strasbourg – October 10, 1994 in Strasbourg), was a French playwright, poet, songwriter, actor, humourist, politician and a prominent figure in Alsatian culture. In 1946, he cofounded De Barabli (The Umbrella), the most popular Alsatian language satirical cabaret. He was later elected a Strasbourg city councillor.

== Bibliography ==
- Pierre Pflimlin & Malou Schneider, Nouveau dictionnaire de biographie alsacienne, Fédération des sociétés d'histoire et d'archéologie d'Alsace, vol. 27, p. 2748
