= Thimonville =

- Commune
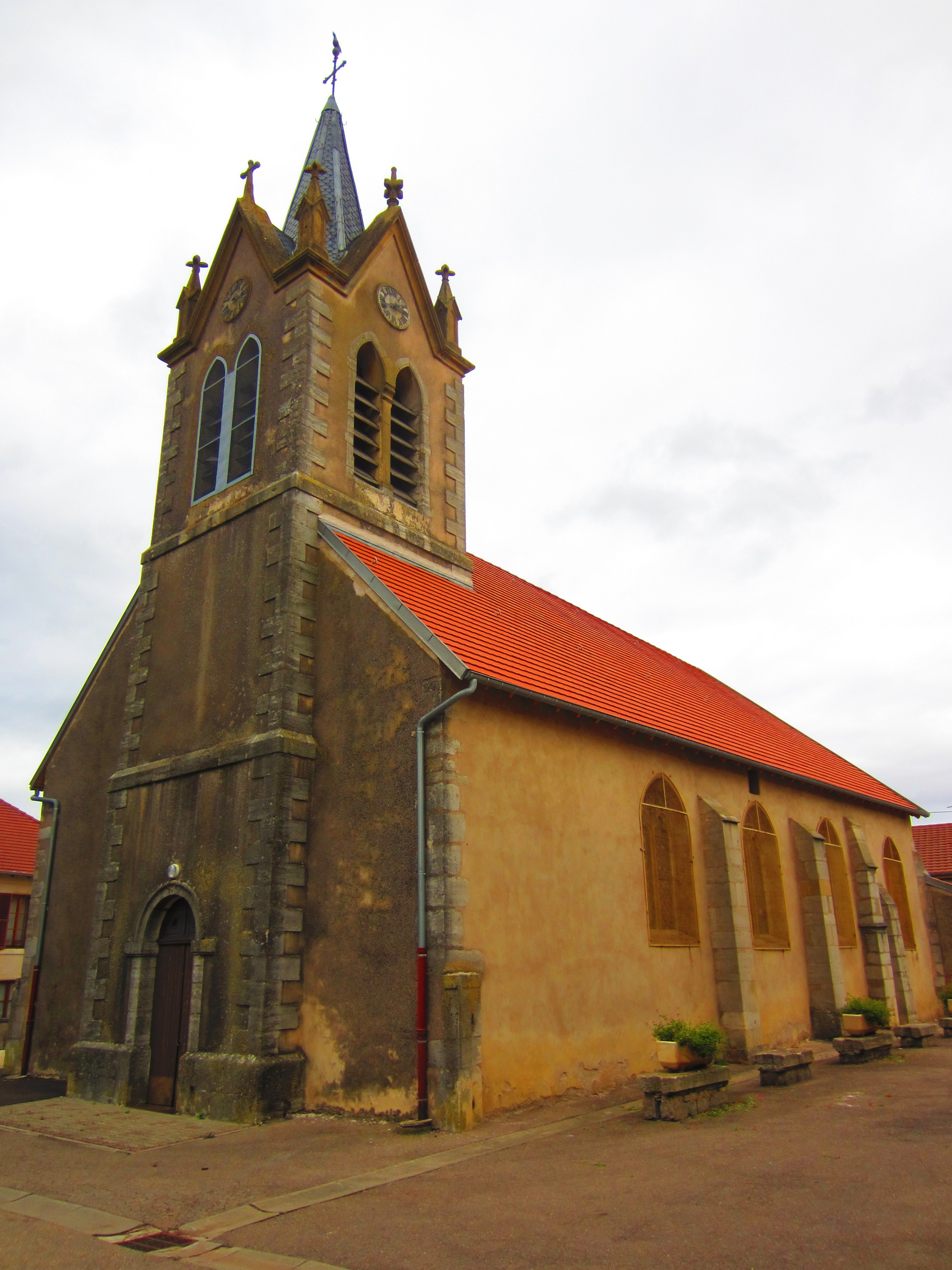
- The church in Thimonville

- Coat of arms
- Location of Thimonville
- Location within France Location within Grand Est
- Coordinates: 48°57′19″N 6°23′49″E
- Country: France
- Region: Grand Est
- Department: Moselle
- Arrondissement: Metz
- Canton: Faulquemont
- Intercommunality: CC Sud Messin

Government
  - Mayor (2020–2026): Hervé Martin
- Area^{1}: 7.4 km^{2} (2.9 sq mi)
- Elevation: 260 m (850 ft)
- Highest elevation: 291 m (955 ft)
- Lowest elevation: 228 m (748 ft)
- Population (2023): 133
  - Density: 18/km^{2} (47/sq mi)
- Time zone: UTC+01:00 (CET)
  - Summer (DST): UTC+02:00 (CEST)
- INSEE/Postal code: 57671 /57580
- ^{1} French Land Register data, which excludes lakes, ponds, glaciers > 1 km^{2} (0.386 sq mi or 247 acres) and river estuaries.

Thimonville (French pronunciation: [timɔ̃vil]; German: Thimmenheim) is a commune in the Moselle department in Grand Est in north-eastern France.

== See also ==
- Communes of the Moselle department
