= Pierre Weil =

French psychologist, author and educator

- Born: 16 April 1924; Strasbourg, France
- Died: 10 October 2008 (aged 84); Brazil
- Education: University of Paris VII
- Occupation: Psychologist
- Writing career
- Language: English; French

Pierre Weil (16 April 1924 – 10 October 2008) was a psychologist, author and educator dedicated to the cause of world peace. He was born in Strasbourg, and received a psychology doctorate from University of Paris VII, where he was taught by Henri Wallon, André Rey and Jean Piaget. He founded the City of Peace Foundation in Brazil in 1986, and with Jean-Yves Leloup the International Holistic University of Brasília (UNIPEACE), of which he was the director. In 2000, Weil received an honourable mention for the UNESCO Prize for Peace Education.

Weil was the author of more than 40 books. His book O Corpo Fala ("The Body Speaks") went through more than 60 editions in Brazil.

== Selected works ==
- The Art of Living in Peace: Towards a New Peace Consciousness
- The Silent Revolution (autobiography)
- Le dernier pourquoi : Si Dieu nous parlait...
- Les Chemins De Fer
- Los Limites Del Ser Humano
- L'homme sans frontieres : Les etats modifies de conscience
- O Corpo Fala
- L'uomo senza frontiere. Gli stati alterati di coscienza [trad. it. di Pasquale Sacco] Ed. Crisalide, Spigno Saturnia, Latina, Italia, 1996
