= Paul Girard =

French Hellenist, archaeologist and epigrapher (1852–1922)

Paul Frédéric Girard (23 March 1852, Paris – 1 July 1922, Paris) was a French Hellenist, archaeologist and epigrapher.

== Biography ==
A student of the École Normale Supérieure, he obtained his agrégation de lettres in 1875. A member of the French School at Athens from 1875 to 1879, he directed the excavations of the Heraion of Samos and purchased the Hera for the Louvre museum (1879).

A lecturer at the Faculty of Letters of Toulouse (1881), he provided a Greek language and literature lecture at the École Normale Supérieure from 1893 to 1903. He held the chair of Greek language and literature at the Sorbonne from 1904 to 1922.

First General Secretary of the Revue des études grecques, he was a founding member of the Association Guillaume Budé in 1917.

He was elected a member of the Académie des Inscriptions et Belles-Lettres in 1908.

== Works ==
- 1881: L'Asclépeion d'Athènes d'après les récentes découvertes
- 1889: L'éducation athénienne au Ve et au IVe siècle avant J.-C, Hachette
- 1892: La Peinture antique on Gallica
- 1895: La coutume à Rome, Textes de droit romain,
- 1914: Alphonse Ducatel, professeur au lycée Condorcet (10 février 1851-11 décembre 1913), Belin
- 1917: Séance publique annuelle de l'Académie des inscriptions et belles-lettres, Firmin-Didot

== Bibliography ==
- P. Monceaux, Éloge funèbre de M. Paul Girard, Comptes rendus de l'Académie des inscriptions et belles-lettres, 1922. Read online on Persée.fr.
- H. Goelzer, Notice sur la vie et les travaux de M. Paul Girard, Institut de France, 1923
- J. Toutain, Notice nécrologique, in Bulletin de la Société nationale des antiquaires de France, 1923
- Ève Gran-Aymerich, Les chercheurs de passé, Éditions du CNRS, 2007, p. 831
