= Nicolas Mougin =

French professional vert skater (born 1979)

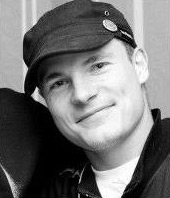

Personal information
- Nationality: French
- Born: September 28, 1979 (age 46) Strasbourg, France

Sport
- Sport: Vert skating
Medal record
Competitions
Representing France
Bronze medal – third place	2011 European Championships	Vert
Gold medal – first place	2005 France Championships	Vert
Gold medal – first place	2004 France Championships	Vert
Gold medal – first place	2003 ASA Championships	Vert
Gold medal – first place	2002 France Championships	Vert

Nicolas Mougin (born September 28, 1979 in Strasbourg) is a French professional vert skater. Mougin started skating when he was twelve years old in 1991 and turned professional in 2002. Mougin has won many competitions in his vert skating career. Since 2008, he his consultant in business transfert for the public compagny "La Chambre de Métiers d'Alsace" in France.

Best Tricks: Frontside Mute 720

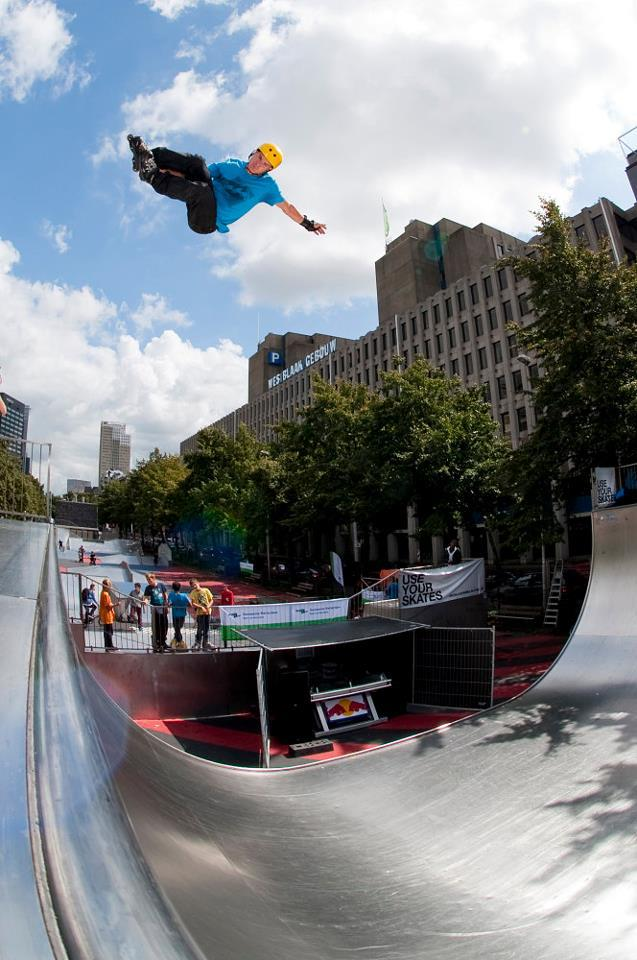
Nicolas Vert Skating

== Vert Competitions ==
- 2019 World Championships - Vert: 2nd
- 2017 European Championships - Vert: 2nd
- 2016 European Championships - Vert: 1st
- 2011 European Championships - Vert: 3rd
- 2006 ASA World Championships - Vert: 11th
- 2005 ASA Amateur World Championships - Vert: 1st
- 2004 ASA Washington Pro Championships - Vert: 5th
- 2003 France Championships - Vert: 1st
- 2002 France Championships - Vert: 1st
