= Antoine Grauss =

French footballer (born 1984)

Personal information
- Date of birth: August 3, 1984 (age 42)
- Place of birth: Strasbourg, France
- Height: 1.82 m (5 ft 11 1/2 in)
- Position: Midfielder

Senior career*
Years	Team	Apps	(Gls)
2003–2005	Monaco (B team)		
2005–2006	Clermont Foot	26	(3)
2006–2010	LB Châteauroux	35	(1)
- * Club domestic league appearances and goals

Antoine Grauss (born August 3, 1984) is a French professional football player. He played in the Ligue 2 for LB Châteauroux.
