= Fritsche Closener =

Fritsche Closener or Friedrich Klosener (died between 1372 and 1396) was a priest and historian of Strasbourg. His work was one of the first vernacular city chronicles, a type that became very common in Germany in the century that followed.

Closener's father was Sifrid, a burger of Strasbourg, and his mother was Margareta Spirer. From 1343 Closener was the custodian of the Marienaltar in Strasbourg Cathedral, where later he served as vicar of the large choir. In 1358 he received the prestigious prebend of Saint Catherine's Chapel.

His most famous work is his Chronicle (full title Kronika aller der bebeste und aller der romeschen keisere, die sit Cristus gebürte sint gewesen). It is written in High German and connects the history of his city, its region and its bishops with the wider world of the Holy Roman Empire. He says that he finished this work on 8 July 1362, the same day an earthquake struck Strasbourg. His sources included Martin von Troppau, a version of the Sächsische Weltchronik and the Bellum Waltherianum of his predecessor, Ellenhard of Strasbourg, which he translated and incorporated.

Closener also compiled a German–Latin dictionary, the Vocabularium seu nomenclator, and a now lost order of worship for Strasbourg Cathedral around 1364, Directorium chori.

Closener's date of death is unknown. According to some sources he died before 11 March 1373. Others place it after 1384 or between 1390 and 1396.

== Sources ==
- Feller-Vest, Veronika: "Closener, Fritsche" in German, French and Italian in the online Historical Dictionary of Switzerland, 2003.
- Fuchs, François-Joseph. "Closener, Fritsche (Frédéric)". Nouveau dictionnaire de biographie alsacienne.
- Gerber, Harry (1957). "Closener, Fritsche". Neue Deutsche Biographie. Vol. 3. pp. 294–95.
- Hegel, Karl von (1876). "Closener, Fritsche". Allgemeine Deutsche Biographie. Allgemeine Deutsche Biographie. Vol. 4. p. 341.
- Schneider, Joachim (2016). "Klosener, Fritsche". In Graeme Dunphy; Cristian Bratu (eds.). Encyclopedia of the Medieval Chronicle. Brill Online. doi:10.1163/2213-2139_emc_SIM_01606.
