= Robert Redslob =

German-French law-scientist (1882-1962)

Robert Redslob (3 February 1882 – 6 June 1962) was a German-French constitutional and public international law-scientist who was critical of the French constitution in the early twentieth century. He was born in Straßburg in Alsace–Lorraine. From 1900 to 1906 he studied law (inter alia) in Straßburg and in Berlin. In 1913 he accepted a position as professor at the University of Rostock, and after the First World War he returned to Strasbourg to the newly established University of Strasbourg.

Redslob's ideas from his work Die parlamentarische Regierung in ihrer wahren und in ihrer unechten Form from 1918 had a remarkable influence on the German Weimar constitution of 1919. (The German title means ‘The parliamentary government in its true form and in its false (imperfect, incorrect) form’. The addition to the title: Eine vergleichende Studie über die Verfassungen von England, Belgien, Ungarn, Schweden und Frankreich is ‘A comparative survey of the constitutions of England, Belgium, Hungary, Sweden and France’.)

In his capacity as a professor at The Hague Academy of International Law, Redslob introduced the concept of heimat in relation to international law in 1931. He was awarded the Latvian Order of the Three Stars 4th Class on 15 November 1935.

== Redslob as a Modernist Legal Writer ==
Scholar Nathaniel Berman, who has written extensively on law and international affairs contends that Redslob's work is an example of a modernist tendency that flourished in international law between World War I and World War II. According to Berman, "[f]or Redslob, the clash between the revolutionary aspirations of nationalism and the self-preserving will of established states was nothing less than that between 'creative freedom and legality.'" Comparing Redslob's position as a modernist legal thinker to Picasso's status as a modernist painter, Berman describes four tendencies in the modernist view of international law that are parallel to the basic principles of high modernism in art. The modernist principles of international law, reflected in the work of Redslob and others, are:

1. "A critique of the view of the sovereign state as the object which defines international law and to which it must seek to conform its doctrines and institutions";
2. "Openness to hitherto repressed or denied forces of nationalism";
3. "The unprecedented invention of a wide variety of techniques, understood as specifically legal";
4. "Juxtaposition in international legal disputes, doctrines, and institutions, of elements incompatible under traditional legal criteria."

Berman's article has been cited as an example of the interdisciplinary approach that is prominent in the critical legal studies movement. Legal scholar David Kennedy, speaking of Berman's juxtaposition of Redslob and Picasso, said that "[w]hat is interesting is the way this juxtaposition foregrounds the role of the individual as a culture worker, the producer of legal texts and institutions. His project asks us to ask, 'What was Redslob's strategy?'"
