= List of senators of Bas-Rhin =

Location of Bas-Rhin in France

Following is a list of senators of Bas-Rhin, people who have represented the department of Bas-Rhin in the Senate of France. Bas-Rhin was annexed by Germany in 1871 after the Franco-Prussian War, and was returned to France in 1919 by the Treaty of Versailles. Therefore the first senators of Bas-Rhin took their seats in 1920.

== Third Republic ==
Senators for Bas-Rhin under the French Third Republic were:

In office	Name	Party	Notes
1920–1927	Nicolas Delsor	Popular Republican Union (UPR)	Former member of the German Reichstag
1920–1935	Michel Diebolt-Weber	Démocrate	
1920–1935	Frédéric Eccard	Démocrate	
1920–1927	Émile Taufflieb	Popular Republican Union (UPR)	
1920–1928	Lazare Weiller	Popular Republican Union (UPR)	Former deputy of Charente, father of Paul-Louis Weiller.
1927–1940	Hubert d'Andlau de Hombourg	Popular Republican Union (UPR)	
1927–1940	Jean de Leusse	Popular Republican Union (UPR)	
1927–1940	Eugène Muller	Popular Republican Union (UPR)	Former deputy
1935–1940	Joseph Sigrist	Popular Republican Union (UPR)	Elected deputy in 1946
1935–1940	Jean-Jacques Urban	Démocrate	

== Fourth Republic ==
Senators for Bas-Rhin under the French Fourth Republic were:

In office	Name	Party	Notes
1946–1948	Alfred Wehrung	Popular Republican Movement (MRP)	
1946–1952	Alfred Westphal	Rally of the French People (RPF)	
1946–1947	Alfred Oberkirch	Popular Republican Movement (MRP)	Died in office 5 January 1947
1947–1950	Albert Ehm	Popular Republican Movement (MRP)	Resigned 20 January 1950
1948–1959	Robert Hoeffel	Rally of the French People (RPF)	
1948–1958	René Radius	Rally of the French People (RPF)	
1950–1952	Alfred Wehrung	Popular Republican Movement (MRP)	
1952–1958	Ernest Koessler	Popular Republican Movement (MRP)	
1952–1959	Paul Wach	Popular Republican Movement (MRP)	Reelected in 5th Republic
1958–1959	Jean-Philippe Bapst	Popular Republican Movement (MRP)	

== Fifth Republic ==
Senators for Bas-Rhin under the French Fifth Republic:

In office	Name	Party or group	Notes
1959–1968	Louis Jung	Popular Republican Movement (MRP)	
1959–1968	Michel Kauffmann	Popular Republican Movement (MRP)	
1959–1968	Michel Kistler	Popular Republican Movement (MRP)	
1959–1968	Paul Wach	Popular Republican Movement (MRP)	
1968–1977	Louis Jung	Centrist Union of Democrats for Progress (UCDP)	
1968–1977	Michel Kauffmann	Centrist Union of Democrats for Progress (UCDP)	
1968–1977	Alfred Kieffer	Centrist Union of Democrats for Progress (UCDP)	
1968–1977	Michel Kistler	Centrist Union of Democrats for Progress (UCDP)	
1977–1986	Daniel Hoeffel	Union for French Democracy (UDF)	Resigned 5 May 1978 (named to cabinet); Returned to senate 27 September 1981
1977–1986	Jean-Paul Hammann	Rally for the Republic (RPR)	Resigned 28 July 1981
1977–1986	Louis Jung	Centrist Union of Democrats for Progress (UCDP); Union for French Democracy (UDF)	
1977–1986	Paul Kauss	Rally for the Republic (RPR)	
1977–1986	Marcel Rudloff	UC – Union for French Democracy (UDF)	
1986–1995	Daniel Hoeffel	Union for French Democracy (UDF)	Resigned 29 April 1993 (named to cabinet)
1986–1995	Jean-Paul Hammann	Rally for the Republic (RPR)	From 30 April 1993 in place of Daniel Hoeffel
1986–1995	Paul Kauss	Rally for the Republic (RPR)	Died in 1991
1986–1995	Joseph Ostermann	Rally for the Republic (RPR)	from 4 November 1991 in place of Paul Kauss
1986–1995	Louis Jung	UC – Union for French Democracy (UDF)	
1986–1995	Philippe Richert	Groupe Union pour un Mouvement Populaire	Elected 27 September 1992
1986–1995	Marcel Rudloff	UC – Union for French Democracy (UDF)	Resigned 5 March 1992 (Named to constitutional council)
1986–1995	André Traband	Union Centriste – Union for French Democracy (UDF)	From 6 March 1992 in place of Marcel Rudloff
1995–2004	Philippe Richert	Groupe Union pour un Mouvement Populaire	
1995–2004	Daniel Hoeffel	Union for French Democracy (UDF) then Union for a Popular Movement (UMP)	
1995–2004	Joseph Ostermann	Rally for the Republic (RPR) then Union for a Popular Movement (UMP)	Election annulled 16 December 1995. Reelected 11 February 1996
1995–2004	Francis Grignon	Groupe Union pour un Mouvement Populaire	
2004–2014	Philippe Richert	Groupe Union pour un Mouvement Populaire	Resigned 15 December 2010 (named to cabinet)
2004–2014	André Reichardt	Groupe Les Républicains	Replaced Philippe Richert 15 December 2010
2004–2014	Fabienne Keller	Groupe Les Républicains	Election annulled 26 November 2004. Reelected 20 February 2005
2004–2014	Francis Grignon	Groupe Union pour un Mouvement Populaire	Election annulled 26 November 2004. Reelected 20 February 2005
2004–2014	Esther Sittler	Groupe Union pour un Mouvement Populaire	Election annulled 26 November 2004. Reelected 20 February 2005
2004–2014	Roland Ries	Groupe socialiste et apparentés	Election annulled 26 November 2004. Reelected 20 February 2005
2014–present	Guy-Dominique Kennel	Groupe Les Républicains	
2014–present	André Reichardt	Groupe Les Républicains	
2014–present	Fabienne Keller	Groupe Les Républicains	
2014–present	Jacques Bigot	Groupe socialiste et républicain	
2014–present	Claude Kern	Groupe Union Centriste	

== Sources ==
- Liste des anciens sénateurs de la IIIème République par circonscription (in French), Sénat de France
- Liste des anciens sénateurs de la IVème République par circonscription (in French), Sénat de France
- Liste des anciens sénateurs de la Vème République par circonscription (in French), Sénat de France
- Liste par département – Bas-Rhin (in French), Sénat de France
