= 1926 Colmar Bloody Sunday =

1926 political clashes in Colmar, Alsace, France

Bloody Sunday
- Date: 22 August 1926
- Location: Colmar, Alsace, France
- Caused by: French government's condemnation of Alsatian autonomy
- Goals: Alsatian autonomy

Parties
French Communist Party; Popular Republican Union	French nationalists (Camelots du Roi and Action française)

Lead figures
Eugène Ricklin	

Casualties
- Injuries: 60+

Bloody Sunday is a name given to political clashes that occurred in Colmar, Alsace, France on August 22, 1926. On that day the French Communist Party and the Colmar section of the Popular Republican Union (a Catholic organization) had organized a joint protest meeting at the Salle des Catherinettes. The theme of the meeting was to denounce measures by the French state against the signatories of the Alsatian autonomist Heimatbund manifesto.

However, a large group of French nationalists had assembled at the meeting point of the rally. They included the royalist Camelots du Roi and Action française. The French nationalists sought to blockade the Alsatian autonomists from holding their meeting. As Dr. Eugène Ricklin, a clerical autonomist and one of the main speakers of the event, and Joseph Rossé, reached the Colmar train station, they were attacked by the French nationalists. At the site of the meeting, violent clashes erupted again. Police, partly mounted, slowly intervened. Around 60 people were injured. Amongst the injured was Ricklin. However, the autonomist rally was conducted despite the violence.

The Bloody Sunday rally was significant in breaking up the taboo of cooperation between communists and Catholic autonomists. It also marked the starting point of a split between a section of Alsatian communists and the French Communist Party. Bloody Sunday furthered cooperation between Alsatian communists with right-wing sectors sharing common autonomist goals, which would eventually lead to the expulsion of a sector of Alsatian communists from the French Communist Party in 1929. The expellees founded the Opposition Communist Party of Alsace-Lorraine.
