= Eugène Ricklin =

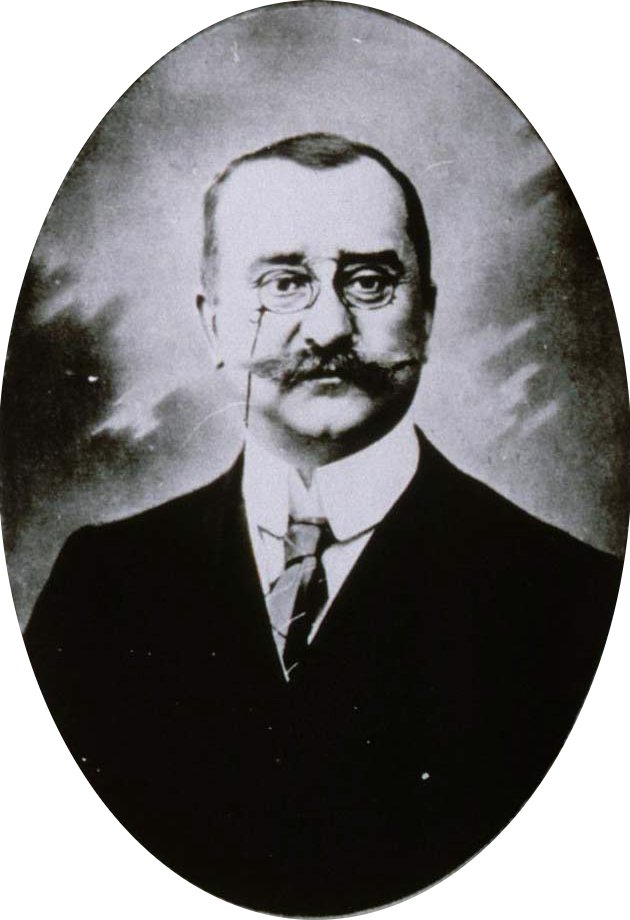
Ricklin in 1915

Doctor Eugène Adolf Ricklin (12 May 1862 – 4 September 1935) was an Alsatian politician. He was known for his fiery opposition both to German and French assimilationist policies in Alsace.

== Biography ==
Eugène Ricklin was born in Dannemarie (German: Dammerkirch) from a sundgauvian hotelier father and an Alsatian mother, Catherine Kayser. After his secondary education in Belfort, he attended the gymnasia of Altkirch and Colmar. He then went to Germany east of the Rhine, to Regensburg, Freiburg im Breisgau, Munich and Erlangen where he studied medicine.

From a young age, he showed a great interest in justice and defence of the common man, and was already noticed at 29 years old when it was suggested to him he might join the municipal council of his home town. At the age of 34, he succeeded Flury, and became mayor of Dannemarie in 1898.

He was relieved of his duties as mayor in 1902 following a complaint about an insult to the Kaiser and as a sanction for having claimed the status of Bundesstaat (federal state) for Alsace-Lorraine. He was disliked by the German authorities and was replaced by the notary Centlivre, a supporter of the Germans. Nevertheless, Ricklin remained a member of the municipal council until 1908.

In 1896, as Flury's successor, he joined the Bezirkstag of Upper Alsace of which he became president during World War I. In 1900, the Bezirkstag delegated him to the Landesausschuss - Alsace-Lorraine's quasi-parliament - in Strasbourg, in place of deselected Anton Cassal of Ferrette. In 1903, he was elected to the Reichstag in Berlin, having been elected deputy for the constituency of Thann-Altkirch.

His rise continued. His authority, rectitude and competence earned him respect and acknowledgement within his party, the Catholic Zentrum (Centre Party), so that he was elected with some of his colleagues of the Zentrum (which obtained a relative majority) in the first election by universal suffrage for the Landtag in 1911. He subsequently became its first president. The Landtag of Alsace-Lorraine has been the only parliamentary institution in Alsatian history, elected by universal suffrage and representing the region as a whole, and succeeded the only indirectly-elected, partly appointed Landesausschuss.

However, his relations with the Germans were problematic. Within his own family he spoke French. He stayed faithful to his fellow Alsatians for whom he did not cease to defend energetically their interests against the imperial administration . At this time he earned the nickname the Sundgau Lion (als: D’r sundgauer Leeb). He even refused the Roter Adlerorden from the imperial government.

Before war broke out, he tirelessly worked for the preservation of peace and, in 1913 and 1914, went with Abbot Haegy to the interparliamentary peace conferences of Bern and Basel where he met again other active pacifists like Jean Jaurès.

During the war, he was charged and transferred to northern France because he strenuously defended his friend Médard Brogly who had been accused of being francophile by a German military court.

At the end of the war, he saw that the full autonomy granted by the Germans in 1918 had arrived too late and, on the abdication of the Kaiser, formed the Nationalrat (National Council) to try to save Alsatian political gains by means of negotiation with the French. He took the initiative and convened the council on 12 November 1918. Elected president of the Nationalrat, he proposed to the French authorities that they accept an agreement guaranteeing those Alsatian rights he knew were threatened by French Jacobinism. But the winds had changed and, with it, many coats within the veterans of the Landtag. He found himself in a minority, and a major part of the Zentrum parliamentarians, with the Social Democrats, didn't want to provoke France and opted to rely on the promises of the French generals such as Joffre. The Nationalrat became the National Council for Alsace-Lorraine shortly before its abolition. For the rest of his life, Ricklin reproached the other Nationalrat members for having acted too late to preserve Alsatian autonomy.

With the arrival of the French on November 22, 1918, Ricklin knew he would face challenges. It was certain that they considered him as the man to be most feared in Alsace. So, they tried by all means to eliminate him from the political scene so as to give themselves a free hand in their policy of francization, which had already been prepared in Paris during the war years. They also tried to prevent him playing a role in the reconstruction of the Zentrumspartei Elsass-Lothringen for which debates began in February 1919. As a result, he was dragged in front of the Commissions de Triage (people sorting commissions) and, during March, this latter president of the Landtag of Alsace-Lorraine was sent into forced residence in the occupied zone near Kehl (at some point, he was even put in prison). In spite of the protest of every mayor and priest of Dannemarie and the French-speaking communes which he always defended during the German period, he was only permitted to return in November 1919, after the parliamentary elections in which he was prevented from standing. When he returned from exile to his native town, ruined, he had moreover to face a plot meant to bring him down professionally.

But Ricklin was a fighter and didn't give up the political struggle. Disappointed, like many, in December 1925 by the behaviour of the French towards Alsace, he returned to public life, first by joining the editorial committee of the Zukunft, then by joining the team that initiated the manifest of the Heimatbund on 7 June 1926. Under his management, the committee of the Heimatbund went into relations with the Breton and Corse autonomists and developed the strategy of the Einheitsfront (unity front).

With parliamentary elections of May 1928 approaching, Poincaré tried to prevent the autonomists participating. Six autonomists newspapers were then banned and the leaders arrested: among them, Joseph Rossé, Karl Hauss and Ricklin. On 16 March 1928, Ricklin, 66 years old, was led handcuffed through Mulhouse to be imprisoned.

But Rossé and Ricklin fought back and whilst in prison applied as candidates for the Union populaire républicaine (Republican Popular Union). Their popularity had not declined; they were duly elected.

After a show trial, they were sentenced, but owing to public outcry, released on 14 July on receiving a presidential pardon. Ricklin was triumphantly welcomed back to the whole of his native Sundgau where the people joined forces behind him, to the point of electing him again to the conseil général in October 1928.

The French government tried again to block them, working for the invalidation of the mandate of the deputies Rossé and Ricklin, on the pretext that the presidential pardon had not granted their complete civic rights. The French deputies agreed with the government and voted for the invalidation with 195 votes for and 29 against with 416 abstentions. The government did the same for their departmental mandate which the Conseil d’État (State Council) invalidated on 22 March 1929. But Ricklin and Rossé struck back. They applied again as candidates and, one more time, were comfortably re-elected on 2 June 1930. The Conseil d’État had then to revive an organic decree dated 2 February 1852 to be able to pronounce a new invalidation. However, under constant public pressure, Ricklin was then promised an amnesty.

During the election of the president of the Republic of May 1931, six Alsatian autonomist deputies voted for "Doctor Eugène Ricklin, last president of the Parliament of Alsace-Lorraine" as a protestation to effect a final pardon and rehabilitation for Ricklin.

However, while he continued to enjoy enormous popularity, Ricklin never recovered from not being granted a full official pardon.

Ricklin died on Wednesday 4 September 1935 at 20:20 after a long stay in the hospital of his native town, Dannemarie.

== See also ==
- List of presidents of the Second Chamber of the Landtag of Alsace-Lorraine

== Sources ==
This article is a translation of the similar article in the French Wikipedia.
