= Republicans of the Centre =

French parliamentary group

The Republicans of the Centre and the Independents of Popular Action were the names given to a parliamentary group in the French Chamber of Deputies of the French Third Republic, composed mainly of Catholic regionalists from Alsace and Lorraine.

It was mainly a Christian democratic formation, descended from two political parties of the German Empire: the Catholic democratic Zentrum party, and the Alsace-Lorraine Regional Party.

In ideological terms, it was considered to be more conservative than the social-Catholic Popular Democratic Party, but more moderate than the main French Catholic party, the Republican Federation. During the 1920s its members had largely sat in parliament among the Republican Federation deputies, but found it to have become too right-wing, French-nationalist and centralist for their tastes.

== 1932 to 1936: the Republicans of the Centre group ==
The Republicans of the Centre (French: Républicains du centre, RDC) existed during the 15th legislature (1932 to 1936). It was set up by the UPR deputy for Colmar, Joseph Rossé.

It contained between six and ten deputies, and was essentially the parliamentary expression of the Christian democratic deputies from the former German provinces: the Alsatian Popular Republican Union and its Lorrain counterpart, the Lorraine Republican Union. There were also a handful of Alsatian Catholic independents who occasionally sat with the group.

This Alsatian heritage was reflected in the group's label of 'Centre': although situated firmly on the right rather than the centre, it carried over the label of the German Zentrum party, to which some UPR deputies had previously belonged.

== 1936 to 1940: the Independents of Popular Action group ==
The Independents of Popular Action (French: Indépendants d'action populaire, IAP) was the successor to the Republicans of the Centre in the 16th legislature of the Third Republic (1936 to 1940).

The group was again predominantly made up of the deputies of the Alsatian Popular Republican Union and Lorrain Republican Union, but they were now joined by other Alsatian regionalists from other ideological traditions, such as the federalist Radical, Camille Dahlet . formed a new group named . a French parliamentary group in the 16th during the French Third Republic between 1936 and 1940. The IAP was a centrist and Christian democratic group composed of the Christian democratic.

After the Second World War, the successors of the group merged with the more centrist Popular Democratic Party to form the Fourth Republic's major centre-right party, the Christian-democratic Popular Republican Movement.

== See also ==
- Category:Republicans of the Centre politicians
- Popular Democratic Party (France)
- Sinistrisme
