= Dannemarie, Haut-Rhin =

Commune in Grand Est, France

Dannemarie Dàmmerkìrch
- Commune
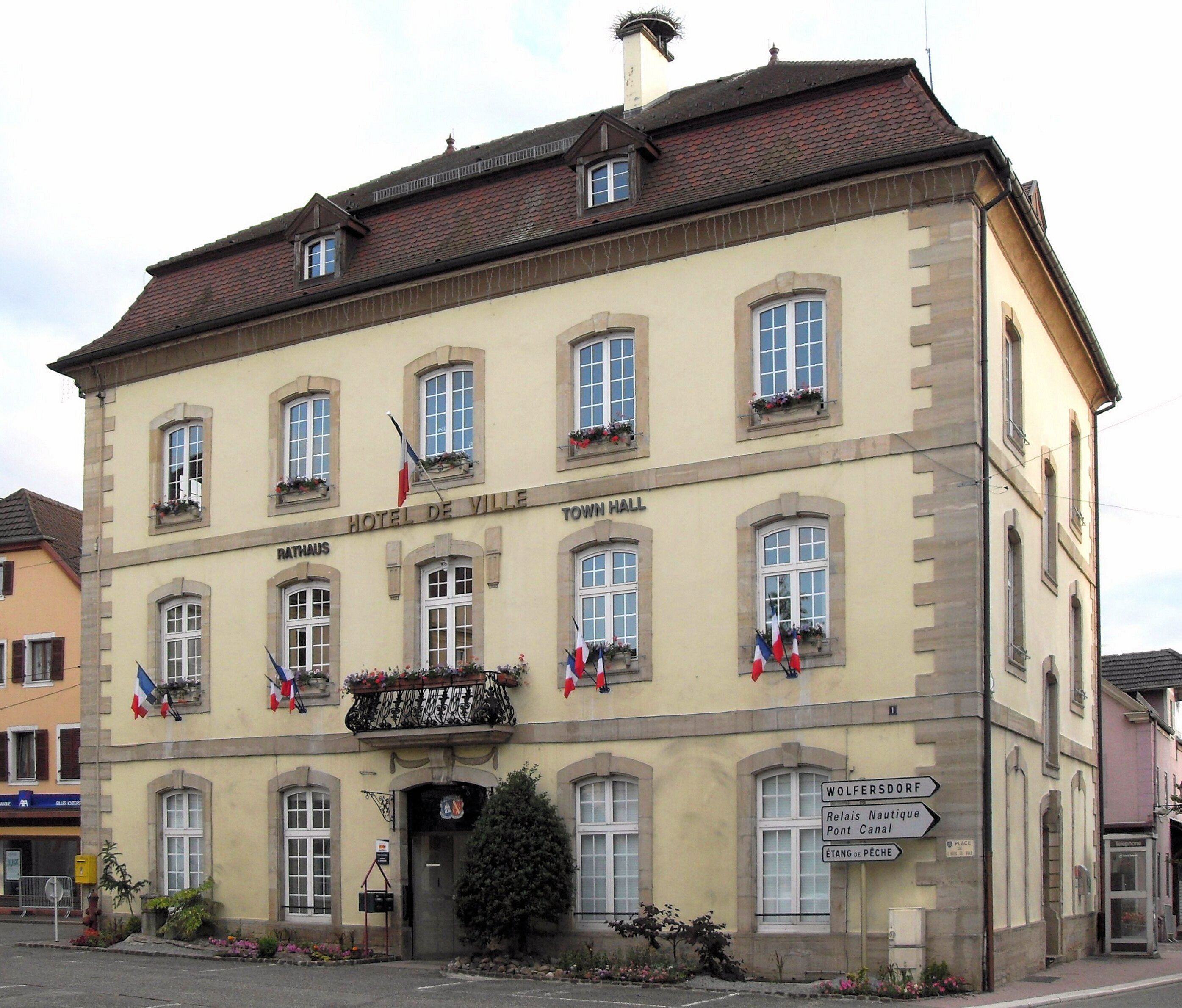
- The town hall in Dannemarie

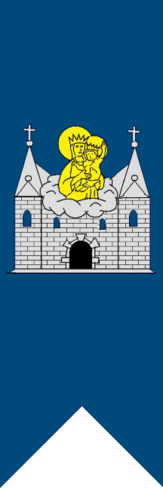
- Flag Coat of arms
- Location of Dannemarie
- Location within France Location within Grand Est
- Coordinates: 47°37′51″N 7°07′11″E
- Country: France
- Region: Grand Est
- Department: Haut-Rhin
- Arrondissement: Altkirch
- Canton: Masevaux-Niederbruck

Government
  - Mayor (2020–2026): Alexandre Berbett
- Area^{1}: 4.35 km^{2} (1.68 sq mi)
- Elevation: 315 m (1,033 ft)
- Highest elevation: 354 m (1,161 ft)
- Lowest elevation: 296 m (971 ft)
- Population (2023): 2,248
  - Density: 517/km^{2} (1,340/sq mi)
- Time zone: UTC+01:00 (CET)
  - Summer (DST): UTC+02:00 (CEST)
- INSEE/Postal code: 68068 /68210
- ^{1} French Land Register data, which excludes lakes, ponds, glaciers > 1 km^{2} (0.386 sq mi or 247 acres) and river estuaries.

Dannemarie (French pronunciation: [danmaʁi] is the French name of Dàmmerkìrch (German: Dammerkirch), a commune in the Haut-Rhin department in Alsace in north-eastern France. It was the seat of a canton of the same name and is the seat of the Communauté de communes de la Porte d'Alsace.

== Geography ==
The town is situated in Sundgau between the towns of Mulhouse (approximately 27 km north) and Belfort (approximately 23 km west) and lies on the river Largue, a tributary of the Ill (a river which flows into the Rhein). It can be reached via the Routes départementales D-103 (Thann-Delle) and D-419 (Belfort-Altkirch-Basel).

== History ==
In 1016 the town is mentioned as Danamarachiricha meaning "Church of the Lady Mary". Throughout history the name changed several times and took on some French and German forms. The name in the local German language was Dammerskirch. From the thirteenth century until 1324 it was part of the Ferrette region. Until the end of the Thirty Years' War in 1648 it was ruled over by the House of Habsburg before falling under the jurisdiction of Cardinal Mazarin.

After the French Revolution it became part of the Belfort district. In 1870 Altkirch became attached to this administrative framework. Today it is part of the Haut-Rhin department.

In August 1914, during the First World War, French troops moved in during the fighting on the approaching Western Front and it became the military headquarters.

== Population ==
Historical population
Year	Pop.	±% p.a.
1968	1,702	—
1975	1,965	+2.07%
1982	1,939	−0.19%
1990	1,820	−0.79%
1999	1,988	+0.99%
2007	2,324	+1.97%
2012	2,311	−0.11%
2017	2,255	−0.49%
2023	2,248	−0.05%
Source: INSEE

== Historic sites ==
- The railway viaduct on the Belfort-Mulhouse line is a 493m long stone arched bridge over the Largue. It was built in 1862 and has since been rebuilt and destroyed four times, in 1870, 1914, 1915 and 1944.
- The town hall or Hôtel de Ville.

== Notable residents ==
- Peter von Hagenbach (c. 1420–1474), Burgundian Landvogt.
- Eugène Ricklin (1862–1935), an Alsatian politician was born in Dannemarie.
- Leo Justinus Kauffmann (1901–1944), composer, was born in Dannemarie.
- Monique Wittig (1935–2003), author and feminist theorist, was born in Dannemarie.

== See also ==
- Communes of the Haut-Rhin department
