= List of presidents of the Second Chamber of the Landtag of Alsace-Lorraine =

The president of the Second Chamber of the Landtag of Alsace-Lorraine was the presiding officer of the second chamber of that legislature.

== Office-holder ==
- Eugène Ricklin 1911–1918

== See also ==
- List of presidents of the First Chamber of the Landtag of Alsace-Lorraine
