= Alsatian Progress Party =

Political party in France

Alsatian Progress Party Elsässische Fortschrittspartei
- Leader: Camille Dahlet
- Founded: October 1926
- Newspaper: Das Neu Elsass
- Ideology: Radicalism; Regionalism; German minority interests
- Political position: Centre-left
- National affiliation: Independent Left (to 1936); Independents of Popular Action (after 1936)

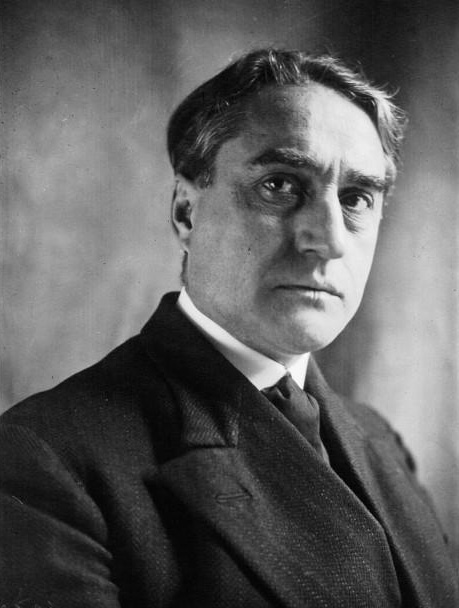
Camille Dahlet, Progress Party leader

The Alsatian Progress Party (German: Elsässische Fortschrittspartei) was a political party in Alsace, France.

The party was founded in October 1926 by Georges Wolf and Camille Dahlet as a regionalist, secular and Radical party, roughly corresponding to Germany's Radical People's Party and France's Radical-Socialist Party.

Dahlet and Wolf had belonged to the Bas-Rhin branch of the Radical Party, but had quit in disagreement with its policies of centralism and anticlericalism, instead establishing the Progress Party as a party for a more decentralised and moderately secular variant of Radicalism. Wolf had been the chairman of a party with the same name and similar goals in the years prior to World War I.

In cultural terms the Progress Party sought to protect Alsatian culture and the status and use of the German and Alsatian languages in Alsace. Institutionally, it demanded the return of the local autonomy of the region, as had been recognized by the German Constitution in 1911.

In April 1927 a party newspaper, Das Neue Elsass ('The New Alsace'), was launched after Wolf had received financial guarantees from it. The Progress Party and Das Neue Elsass obtained a moderate degree of influence in Bas-Rhin.

In 1928 Dahlet became the party leader, after Wolf resigned from the party. Wolf left politics, supposedly for personal reasons, and went back to serve as a pastor of the EPCAAL. Dahlet was elected to parliament in the same year, and would retain his seat until 1940. With Dahlet as the party leader the Progress Party became more radical in its regionalist demands, albeit never straying over to the separatist camp. The party won two seats in the 1929 Strasbourg municipal election.

Between 1928 and 1936 Camille Dahlet sat in the French Chamber of Deputies according to Radicalism, with other centre-left republican independents in the Independent Left technical group. In 1936, however, he sat according to regionalism, in the Independents of Popular Action technical group dominated by the Catholic regionalists of the Alsatian Popular Union.
