= Château de Ferrette =

Ruined castle in Haut-Rhin, France

Coordinates: 47°29′36″N 7°19′5″E

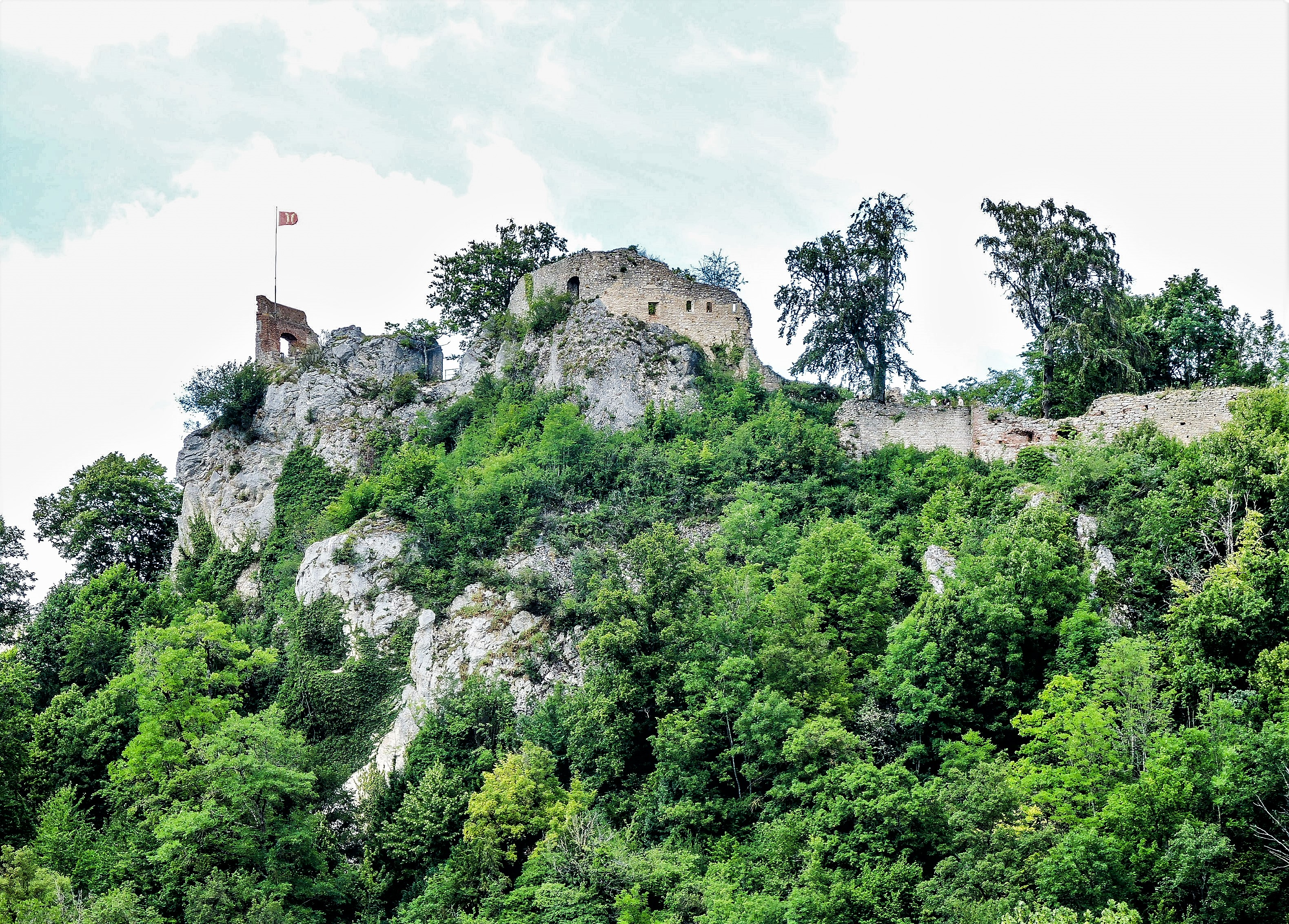
Ruins of the castle

The Château de Ferrette is a ruined castle in the commune of Ferrette in the Haut-Rhin département of France. It is a recognized historical monument since 1930.

== History ==
It was on a rocky peak reaching 612 m altitude, overhanging the town of Ferrette, that Frederic of Montbeliard, son of Louis IV, count de Monbéliard, built the Château de Ferrette. It is not known if Frederic completely built the castle or simply restored a fortress by building on the ruins of what was an observation tower built by the Romans.

In 1103, Frederic I inherited the lands of upper Alsace, which later became the county of Ferrette. He died in about 1168. His son, Louis, succeeded him but died during a crusade he undertook in 1189.

Louis' son, Frederic II, inherited. He developed his possessions to the point of attracting the covetous eye of the Bishop of Basel, with whom he had many conflicts. Frederic was assassinated in 1233, officially by his son, Louis, who was accused of patricide and excommunicated. His other son, Ulrich, seized power. It was only six centuries later that a parchment was discovered containing Ulrich's consent to the assassination of his father.

This patricide was not a success because in 1271, Ulrich was forced to sell the castle and the town of Ferrette to the Bishop of Basel, thus becoming a vassal of the Bishop, as were to be his son Thiébaut and his grandson Ulrich III.

With the death of Ulrich III, in 1324, Jeanne de Ferrette inherited the County of Ferrette (Pfirt). She married the Archduke Albert II of Habsburg and thus integrated her county into Austria, which had it managed by administrators appointed by the Emperors. Given as a bailiwick to the lords Reich von Reichenstein in 1504, then to the Fuggers of Augsburg from 1540 to 1567, the castle was transformed into a garrison.

== The castle in 1600 ==
In 1600, the castle had three buildings:

- The “Oberschloss” or higher castle, comprising six rooms and eleven bedrooms, kitchen, bathroom and cellars. This part of the castle had a well 60m deep and a chapel dedicated to the virgin Saint Catherine.

- The bailiff's house had four rooms, seven bedrooms, two kitchens, a stable to house three horses, a cellar and even a bathroom. It also had lofts to store 1000 sacks of grains. A bastion with two dungeons was designed to defend this building.

- The House of the Knights had only one room and one bedroom but with lofts able to contain 500 sacks of grains.

A wall with towers and bastions designed to be held in a determined attack, surrounded the castle.

== Today ==
Set on fire by the French in 1635, the castle was destroyed after the Thirty Years' War and only the lower part was restored. In 1644, at the Treaty of Munster in Westphalia, the Emperor of Austria yielded the county of Ferrette to the King of France, Louis XIV, who gave it to his minister, Cardinal Mazarin, who offered it to his niece. Her husband took the titles of Duke de Mazarin and Count de Ferrette. These titles were passed on to his heirs and exist today in the person of the Prince of Monaco who still carries the title of Count de Ferrette.

Thereafter, the castle was sold to the Zuber family, rich textile manufacturers from the Mulhouse region. Its ruins are maintained with the financial aid of the town of Ferrette, of the département of Haut-Rhin and the Services des Bâtiments de France.

== See also ==
- List of castles in France
