= Lorrain Republican Union =

The Lorrain Republican Union (French: Union républicaine lorraine, URL) was a Christian democratic party in Moselle, France during the Third Republic. Founded in 1919, the URL became the dominant party in Moselle during the Interwar era. In Alsace, the Popular Republican Union (UPR) was considered the URL's sister party. The URL was much more conservative than the Popular Democratic Party (PDP), the main Christian democratic party in the rest of France at the time.

The URL was founded in 1919 by former Lorrain members of the Catholic Zentrum in Alsace-Lorraine, formed since the mid-1890s and being with 31% of the seats the strongest party in the Landtag of the former Alsace-Lorraine, in order to defend Moselle's judicial specificity. In the 1919 French legislative election the URL won 65% of the votes and all its candidates were elected, including a young Robert Schuman. In 1923, the URL loosely allied itself to the conservative Republican Federation became known as the Republican Democratic Union (URD) in 1929. The URL-URD evolved to become more of an electoral coalition rather than an organized political party, an evolution all too common in France at the time. Despite the independence of its members, the URL maintained a strong base due to the support of the clergy, mayors, industrialists, and the media.

Despite support for the Catholic Church and Lorrain specificity, the URL split ideologically regarding autonomy as the German speaking members favored autonomy while the French speaking wing of the party did not.

The UPL, UPR, and PDP merged in 1946 to the create the Popular Republican Movement (MRP).

== Elections ==
The URL won all seats in Moselle in 1919 and 1924, and won 5 out of 9 seats in 1928. The party also had 5 Senators and controlled Moselle's general council.

In the Chamber of Deputies, the URL's parliamentarians sat with various groups from the centre-right and the right before forming, with the Alsatian UPR, the Republicans of the Centre in 1932 and the Independents of Popular Action in 1936.
