= List of presidents of the First Chamber of the Landtag of Alsace-Lorraine =

The president of the First Chamber of the Landtag of Alsace-Lorraine was the presiding officer of the first chamber of that legislature

== Office-holders ==
- Otto Back 1911–1917
- Johannes Hoeffel 1917–1918

== See also ==
- List of presidents of the Second Chamber of the Landtag of Alsace-Lorraine
