= Alsace–Lorraine =

1871–1918 territory of the German Empire

Coordinates: 48°40′N 7°00′E

Imperial Territory of Alsace–Lorraine Reichsland Elsaß–Lothringen (German) Riichsland Elsass–Lothringe (Alemannic German) Territoire impérial d'Alsace–Lorraine (French)
- Imperial territory of the German Empire
- 1871–1918
- Flag Coat of arms

- Alsace–Lorraine within the German Empire

Anthem
- "Elsässisches Fahnenlied" (German) (English: "Song of the Alsatian Flag")
- Capital: Strassburg (Strasbourg)
- Area
  - 1910: 14,496 km^{2} (5,597 sq mi)
- Population
  - 1910: 1,874,014
- Government
  - Type: Federal territory
- Head of State
  - 1871–1879: Eduard von Möller (first, as Oberpräsident)
  - 1918: Rudolf Schwander (last, as Reichsstatthalter)
- Legislature: Landtag
- History
  - Treaty of Frankfurt: 10 May 1871
  - Disestablished: 1918
  - Treaty of Versailles: 28 June 1919
- Political subdivisions: Bezirk Lothringen; Oberelsass; Unterelsass
Preceded by
French Third Republic
Haut-Rhin
Bas-Rhin
Moselle
Meurthe
Vosges
Succeeded by
Alsace-Lorraine Soviet Republic
- Today part of: France

Alsace–Lorraine (German: Elsaß–Lothringen), officially the Imperial Territory of Alsace–Lorraine (German: Reichsland Elsaß–Lothringen), was a territory of the German Empire between 1871 and 1918, comprising most of Alsace and part of Lorraine. Its capital was Strasbourg. It was annexed by the German Empire following its victory in the Franco-Prussian War and formally ceded by France under the Treaty of Frankfurt (1871). French resentment over the loss of the territory was one of the contributing factors to World War I. Following Germany's defeat in that conflict in 1918, Alsace–Lorraine was taken by France; its cession was confirmed under the Treaty of Versailles.

Alsace–Lorraine was the only territory of the German Empire administered directly by the imperial government rather than as a constituent state. It gradually acquired representative institutions, culminating in the 1911 constitution, an elected Landtag, and limited internal autonomy. It also elected deputies to the Reichstag, where protest, autonomist, and empire-wide political parties competed for electoral support.

Most inhabitants spoke German dialects, while French was spoken mainly in parts of Lorraine. The territory's linguistic, religious and political diversity shaped its public life throughout the German period. During the Second World War, Alsace and Moselle were annexed by Nazi Germany before being restored to France again in 1944–45.

Some legal provisions specific to the territory remain in force as the local law in Alsace–Moselle. Since 2016, the area has formed part of the French administrative region of Grand Est.

== Geography ==
Alsace–Lorraine had a land area of 14,496 km^{2} (5,597 sq mi). Its capital was Straßburg. It was divided into three districts (Bezirke in German):

- Oberelsaß (Upper Alsace), whose capital was Kolmar, had a land area of 3,525 km^{2} (1,361 sq mi) and corresponds precisely to the current department of Haut-Rhin
- Unterelsaß, (Lower Alsace), whose capital was Straßburg, had a land area of 4,755 km^{2} (1,836 sq mi) and corresponds precisely to the current department of Bas-Rhin
- Bezirk Lothringen, (Lorraine), whose capital was Metz, had a land area of 6,216 km^{2} (2,400 sq mi) and corresponded precisely to the current department of Moselle

=== Towns and cities ===
The largest urban areas in Alsace–Lorraine at the 1910 census were:

- Straßburg: (now Strasbourg): 220,883 inhabitants
- Mülhausen: (Mulhouse): 128,190 inhabitants
- Metz: 102,787 inhabitants
- Diedenhofen: (Thionville): 69,693 inhabitants
- Colmar: 44,942 inhabitants

== History ==
=== Background ===
The modern history of Alsace–Lorraine was primarily influenced by the rivalry between French and German nationalism.

Due to "natural boundaries" shared between France and Germany—the Pyrenees to the southwest, the Alps to the southeast, as well as the Rhine to the northeast; France sought to annex territories in the Holy Roman Empire west of the Rhine. Present day Alsace was progressively conquered by France under Louis XIII and Louis XIV in the 17th century. Strasbourg was conquered in 1681, while Lorraine was incorporated from the 16th century under Henry II through the 18th century under Louis XV. Previously, the Three Bishoprics had came under control of Henry II as early as 1552. The territory of the Duchy of Lorraine, owned Francis of Lorraine, by came under French influence after the War of the Polish Succession. As a part of the subsequent peace settlement, the French candidate for the Polish throne, Stanisław I Leszczyński, was granted the Duchy of Lorraine. The Duchy later came into possession of the French crown territories upon Stanisław's death in 1766.

German nationalism in the 19th century originated as a reaction against the French occupation of large areas of Germany under Napoleon. Nationalists sought to unify all the German-speaking populations of the former Holy Roman Empire into a single nation-state. The nationalists utilized the presence of German dialects widely spoken in Alsace and Moselle (northern Lorraine) as justification for their inclusion into the anticipated German nation-state.

The will of a people has nothing to do with the distribution of its soil. [German historian von] Treitschke well defined German doctrine in speaking of Alsace-Lorraine: "We Germans who know Germany and France, know better what suits the Alsatians than the unfortunates themselves. In the perversion of their French life, they have no exact idea of what concerns Germany." [The 1871 pamphlet from von Tretschke is alternatively translated by University of Wisconsin professor, Barry Cerf, as saying, "We Germans who know Germany and France, know better what is good for Alsace than the unhappy people themselves, who through their French associations have lived in ignorance of the new Germany."]

— fr:Jean Finot [and Barry Cerf], quoting Heinrich von Treitschke

French map with shading showing départements before 1870 with black lines after 1871 (Note: Only the département of Meurthe changed its name and became Meurthe-et-Moselle after the border changed; the border between 1871 and 1918 is shown in yellow.)

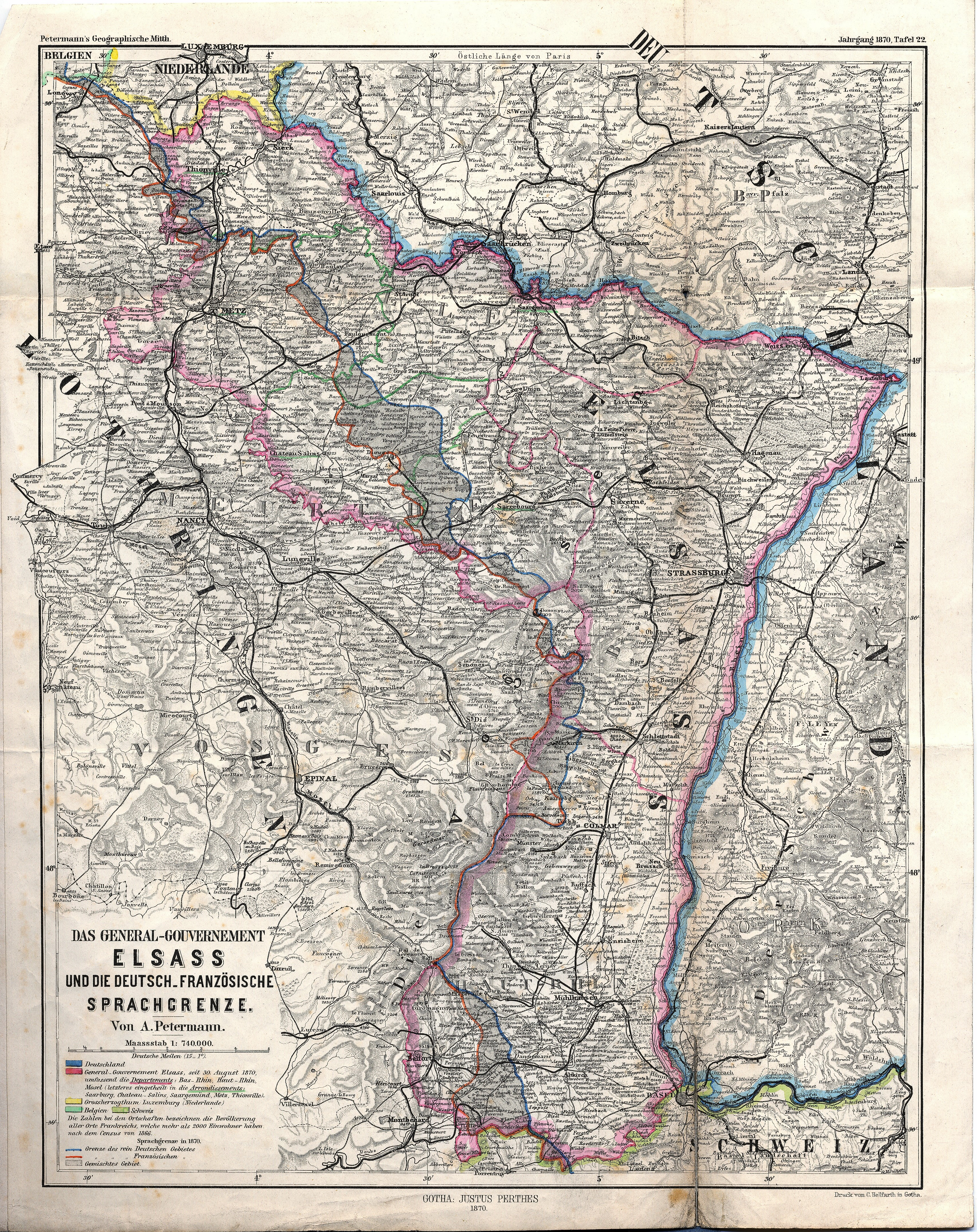
The general government of Elsass (1875) by A. Petermann

=== From annexation to World War I ===
==== Annexation considerations ====
In 1871, the newly created German Empire's demand for Alsace from France after its victory in the Franco-Prussian War was not simply a punitive measure. The transfer was controversial even among the Germans: The German chancellor, Otto von Bismarck, was initially opposed to it, as he thought (correctly) that it would engender permanent French hostility toward Germany. Some German industrialists did not want the competition from Alsatian industries, such as the cloth makers who would be exposed to competition from the sizeable industry in Mulhouse. Karl Marx also warned his fellow Germans:

"If Alsace and Lorraine are taken, then France will later make war on Germany in conjunction with Russia. It is unnecessary to go into the unholy consequences."

Bismarck and the South German industrialists proposed to have Alsace ceded to Switzerland, while Switzerland would compensate Germany with another territory. The Swiss rejected the proposal, preferring to remain neutral between the French and Germans.

The German Emperor, Wilhelm I, eventually sided with army commander Helmuth von Moltke, other Prussian generals and other officials who argued that a westward shift in the French border was necessary for strategic military and ethnographic reasons. From a linguistic perspective, the transfer involved people who for the most part spoke Alemannic German dialects. At the time, ethnic identity was often based primarily on language, unlike today's more multifaceted approach focusing on self-identification. From a military perspective, by early 1870s standards, shifting the frontier away from the Rhine would give the Germans a strategic buffer against feared future French attacks. Due to the annexation, the Germans gained control of the fortifications of Metz and Strasbourg (Strassburg) on the left bank of the Rhine and most of the iron resources of Lorraine.

The possibility of granting Alsace–Lorraine the status of a constituent state of the German Empire with its own sovereign and constitution was not considered, in part because Prussia was convinced that the population of the territory would first have to be Germanized, i.e., accustomed to the new German-Prussian form of government. The Imperial Territory (Reichsland) created on 28 June 1871 was therefore treated initially as an occupied territory and administered directly by an imperial governor (Oberpräsident) appointed by Wilhelm I. Although it was not technically part of the Kingdom of Prussia, in practical terms, it amounted to the same thing since the emperor was also king of Prussia and the chancellor its minister-president.

Memory of the Napoleonic Wars was still alive in the 1870s. Wilhelm I himself had had to flee with the Prussian royal family to East Prussia as a nine-year-old in 1806 and had served in the Battle of Waterloo. Until the Franco-Prussian War, the French had maintained a long-standing desire to establish their entire eastern frontier on the Rhine. Thus, most 19th-century Germans viewed them as aggressive and acquisitive people. In the years before 1870, the Germans feared the French more than the French feared the Germans. Many Germans at the time thought that the unification of Germany as the new Empire would in itself be enough to earn permanent French enmity and thus desired a defensible border with their long-standing enemy. Any additional hostility earned from territorial concessions was downplayed as marginal and insignificant in the scheme.

==== Area annexed ====
The annexed area consisted of the northern part of Lorraine and Alsace.

- The area around the town of Belfort (now the French Territoire de Belfort) was not annexed. The town's heroic defence led by Colonel Denfert-Rochereau, who surrendered only after receiving orders from Paris, allowed President Adolphe Thiers to negotiate retention of the Belfort region.
- The town of Montbéliard and its surrounding area to the south of Belfort, which have been part of the Doubs department since 1816 and therefore were not considered part of Alsace, were not included, even though they had been a Protestant enclave (County of Montbéliard) belonging to Württemberg from 1397 to 1796.

This area corresponded to the present French départements of Bas-Rhin (in its entirety), Haut-Rhin (except the area of Belfort and Montbéliard), and a small northeast section of the Vosges département, all of which made up Alsace, and most of the départements of Moselle (four-fifths of Moselle) and the northeast of Meurthe (one-third of Meurthe), which were the eastern part of Lorraine.

The remaining two-thirds of the département of Meurthe and the westernmost one-fifth of Moselle, which had escaped German annexation, were joined to form the new French département of Meurthe-et-Moselle.

The new border between France and Germany mainly followed the geo-linguistic divide between French and German dialects, except in a few valleys of the Alsatian side of the Vosges mountains, the city of Metz and its region and in the area of Château-Salins (formerly in the Meurthe département), which were annexed by Germany although most people there spoke French. (Note: The linguistic border ran north of the new border, including in the Alemannic towns and cities of Thionville (German name Diedenhofen), Metz, and Château-Salins (German name Salzburg, not to be confused with the much larger city of Salzburg in Austria). The cities of Vic-sur-Seille and Dieuze were French-speaking, as were the valleys containing Orbey and Sainte-Marie-aux-Mines. Similarly, the town of Dannemarie and its surroundings were left in Alsace when language alone could have made them part of the Territoire de Belfort.) In 1900, 11.6% of the population of Alsace–Lorraine spoke French as their first language (11.0% in 1905, 10.9% in 1910).

That small francophone areas were affected was used in France to denounce the new border, since Germany had justified the annexation on linguistic grounds. The German administration was tolerant of the use of the French language (in sharp contrast to the use of the Polish language in the Province of Posen), and French was permitted as an official language and school language in those areas where it was spoken by a majority; this changed in 1914 with the First World War.

==== Citizenship option ====
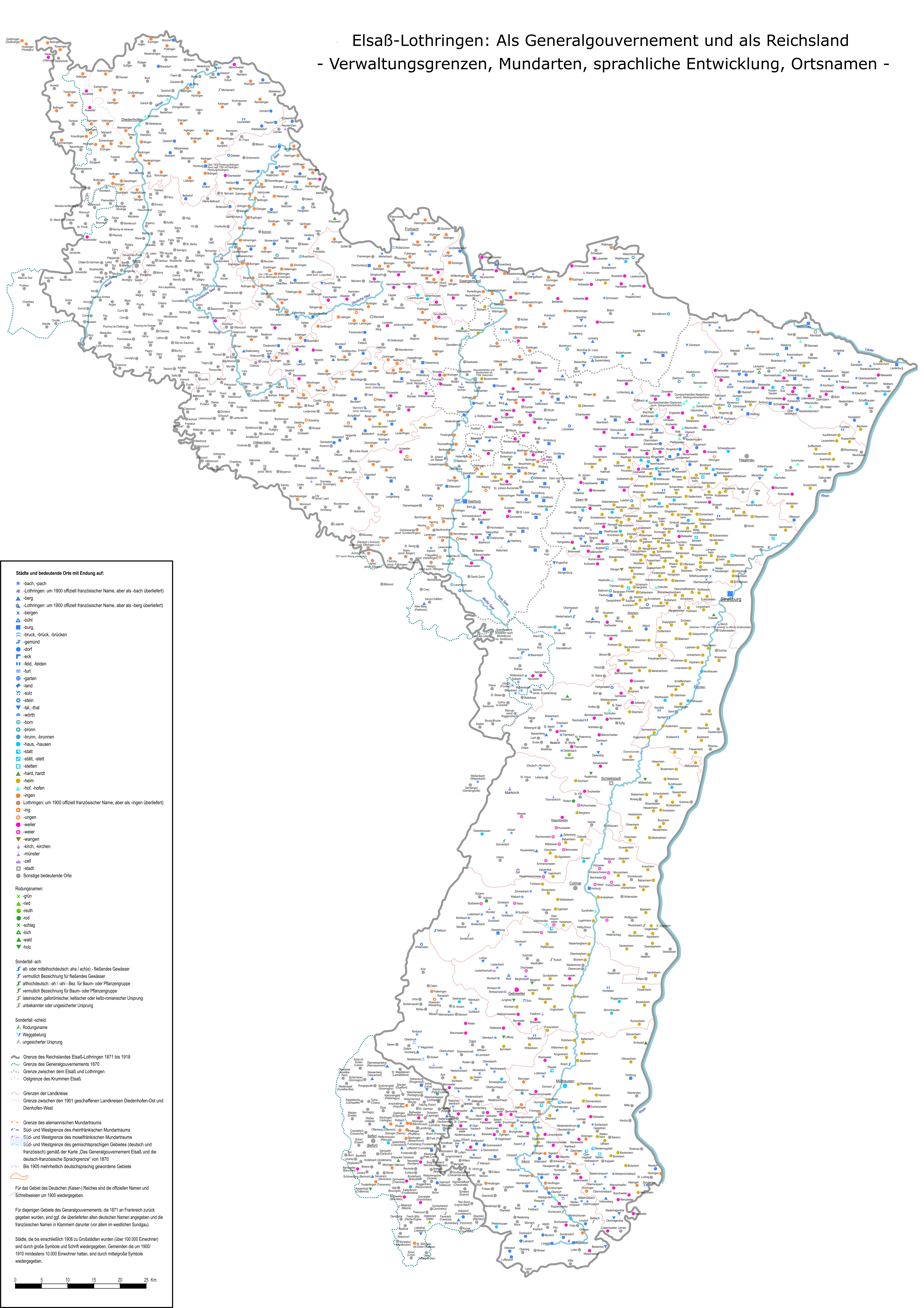
Alsace-Lorraine as general government (1870) and as Reichsland (1871–1918): place names, administrative boundaries, borderlines of German dialects and linguistic development up to 1905.

Under the provisions of the Treaty of Frankfurt, the inhabitants of the annexed areas received Alsace–Lorraine citizenship unless they had migrated directly from France. Until 1 October 1872, they had the option of retaining French citizenship. A total of 160,878 people, or about 10.4% of the total population, took the option. The proportion was particularly high in Upper Alsace, where 93,109 people (20.3%) declared that they wished to retain French citizenship, and much lower in Lower Alsace (6.5%) and Lorraine (5.8%).

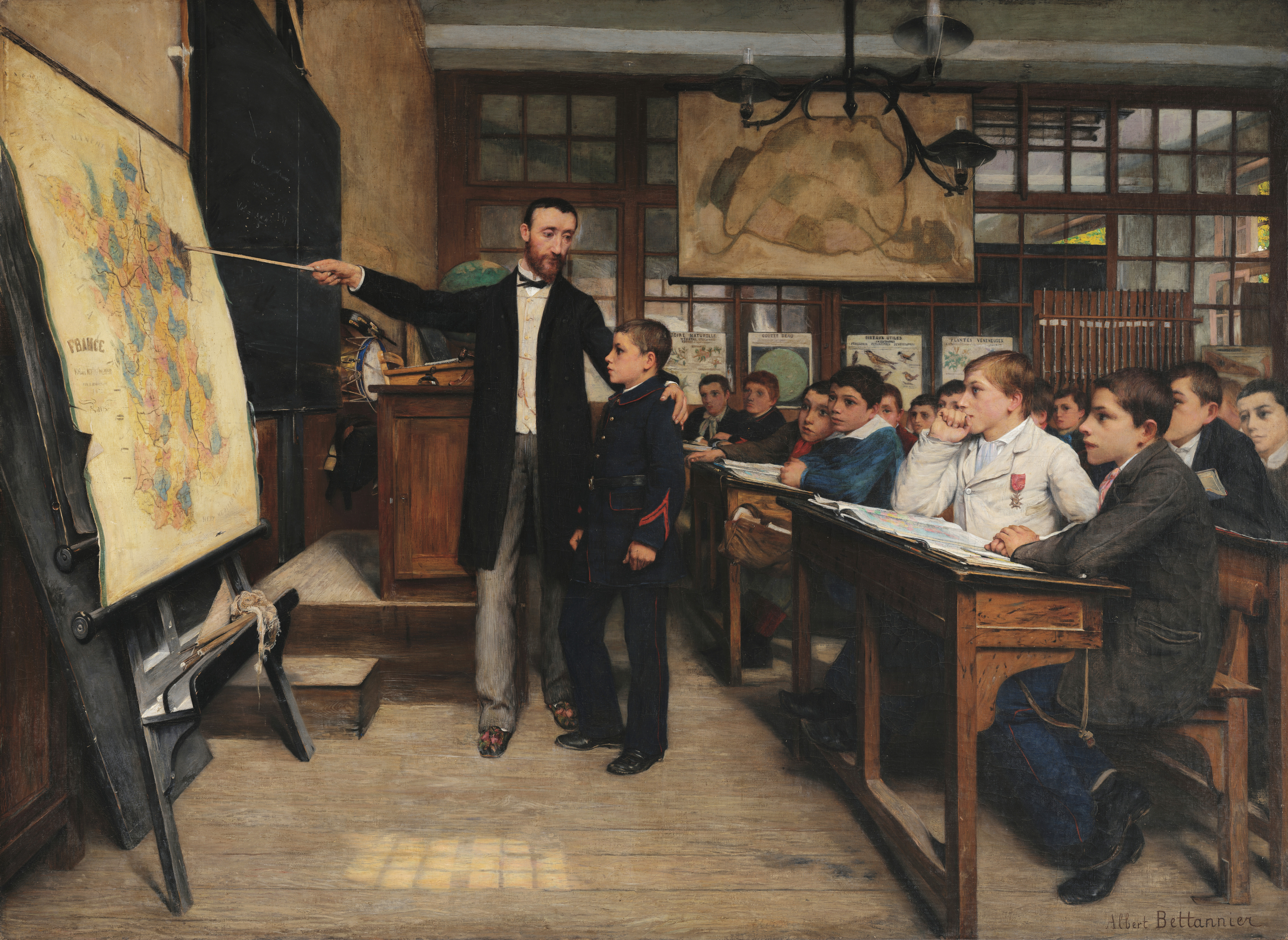
The Black Stain (Note: In France, children were taught in school not to forget the lost provinces, which were coloured in black on maps.) (1887) by Albert Bettannier (Note: Bettannier was a native of Metz who fled to Paris after his hometown was annexed by Germany.)

Originally it was envisaged that those who chose French citizenship would have to leave Alsace–Lorraine. They were allowed to either take their property with them or sell it. Ultimately only about 50,000 people left for France, corresponding to 3.2% of the population of Alsace–Lorraine. The approximately 110,000 optants who had not emigrated by 1 October 1872 lost their option of French citizenship, although they were not expelled by the German authorities but retained German citizenship. Some estimates of the total number of optants, however, are as high as 280,000, with the number who left for France set at about 130,000.

== Government ==
=== Territorial Committee ===
After the Franco-Prussian War, Alsace–Lorraine was directly annexed to the German Empire as an imperial territory and was not a state in its own right. It was not until the decree of Emperor Wilhelm I on 29 October 1874 that a popular representation was established, the Territorial Committee (Landesausschuss). The members of the Territorial Committee were not elected by the people but appointed by the district assemblies (Bezirkstagen). The three district assemblies for Lorraine, Upper Alsace and Lower Alsace each appointed ten members. In 1879 the Territorial Committee was enlarged to 58 members who were indirectly elected by the district assemblies (Lorraine 11, Upper Alsace 10, Lower Alsace 13), the autonomous cities (1 member each from Strassburg, Mülhausen, Metz and Colmar) and the counties (20 members). Initially the Territorial Committee had only an advisory function. In 1877 it was granted a legislative function and the right to create a budget. From 1879 it was allowed to initiate legislation, although the Bundesrat in Berlin had to approve the laws before they were formally enacted by the emperor. Also in 1879, the office of imperial governor in Alsace–Lorraine (Reichsstatthalter) was introduced. He represented the Imperial Territory on behalf of the emperor. The state secretary of the Imperial Office for Alsace–Lorraine headed the government of the Territory.

On 22 June 1877, Eduard von Moeller, the first governor of Alsace–Lorraine, decreed that 90 place names in the district of Lorraine were to be changed from their French to the German forms.

==== Imperial governors 1871–1918 ====
Officeholder	Term start	Term end
Oberpräsident (Governor, as crown representative)
Eduard von Moeller	1871	1879
Imperial Governor
Edwin von Manteuffel	1879	1885
Chlodwig zu Hohenlohe-Schillingsfürst	1885	1894
Hermann zu Hohenlohe-Langenburg	1894	1907
Karl von Wedel	1907	1914
Johann von Dallwitz	1914	1918
Rudolf Schwander	1918	1918

=== State parliament ===
When the constitution of the Imperial Territory of Alsace–Lorraine of 31 May 1911 was enacted, a directly elected state parliament (Landtag) replaced the Territorial Committee. Alsace–Lorraine was granted its own constitution, a freely elected parliament and three representatives in the Bundesrat, the German federal council. Since the Bundesrat represented the interests of the states in Berlin, the members from each state were required to vote as a bloc. In Alsace–Lorraine, the governor determined how its three representatives voted. The votes were not counted if they gave an otherwise defeated Prussian motion a majority.

The introduction of an upper house in parliament was criticized across party lines in Alsace–Lorraine. While upper houses had historical reasons in the other parts of Germany, there was no noble class in Alsace–Lorraine to be integrated in an upper house. It was thus a purely honorary body. The emperor's right to appoint members was particularly criticised.

The upper house was composed of representatives of the major religious communities (Catholics, Lutherans, Protestant Reformed and Jews), the chambers of agriculture and commerce, the trade unions, the judiciary, the cities of Strassburg, Metz, Mülhausen and Colmar, and the University of Strassburg. There were also 18 members appointed by the emperor at the recommendation of the Bundesrat.

The lower house consisted of 60 deputies who were elected for a term of three years by majority vote in the 60 electoral districts. It was called the "People's Parliament" (Volksparlament) in distinction to the upper house, which consisted of notables. The minimum age for eligibility was 25. Male citizens aged 25 and over had the right to vote.

For the late nineteenth century, the constitution was both conservative in defining the first chamber and progressive in the universal and equal manhood suffrage for electing the second chamber. The representation of trade unions in the first chamber was also remarkable since they were not yet legally recognized as workers' representatives. The first and only elections to the parliament of the Imperial Territory took place on 22 and 29 October 1911. The strongest parties were the Alsatian Centre and the Social Democrats with 31.0% and 23.8% of the vote respectively, followed by the Lorraine Autonomists with 16.3%.

==== National ====
In 1874, Alsace–Lorraine was granted 15 seats in the German Reichstag. Between 6 and 10 of the 15 Alsatian–Lorraine deputies elected in each of the Reichstag elections from 1874 through 1887 were counted as "Protest Deputies" because of their opposition to the annexation. Shortly after the 1874 election, the Protesters introduced a French-language motion in the Reichstag requesting that a plebiscite be held on the Imperial Territory's state affiliation: "May it please the Reichstag to decide that the population of Alsace–Lorraine, which has been incorporated into the German Empire by the Treaty of Frankfurt without having been consulted, be called upon to express its opinion on this annexation." The motion was rejected by a large majority in the Reichstag. The population was also not asked for its opinion on state affiliation in 1918 when it returned to France.

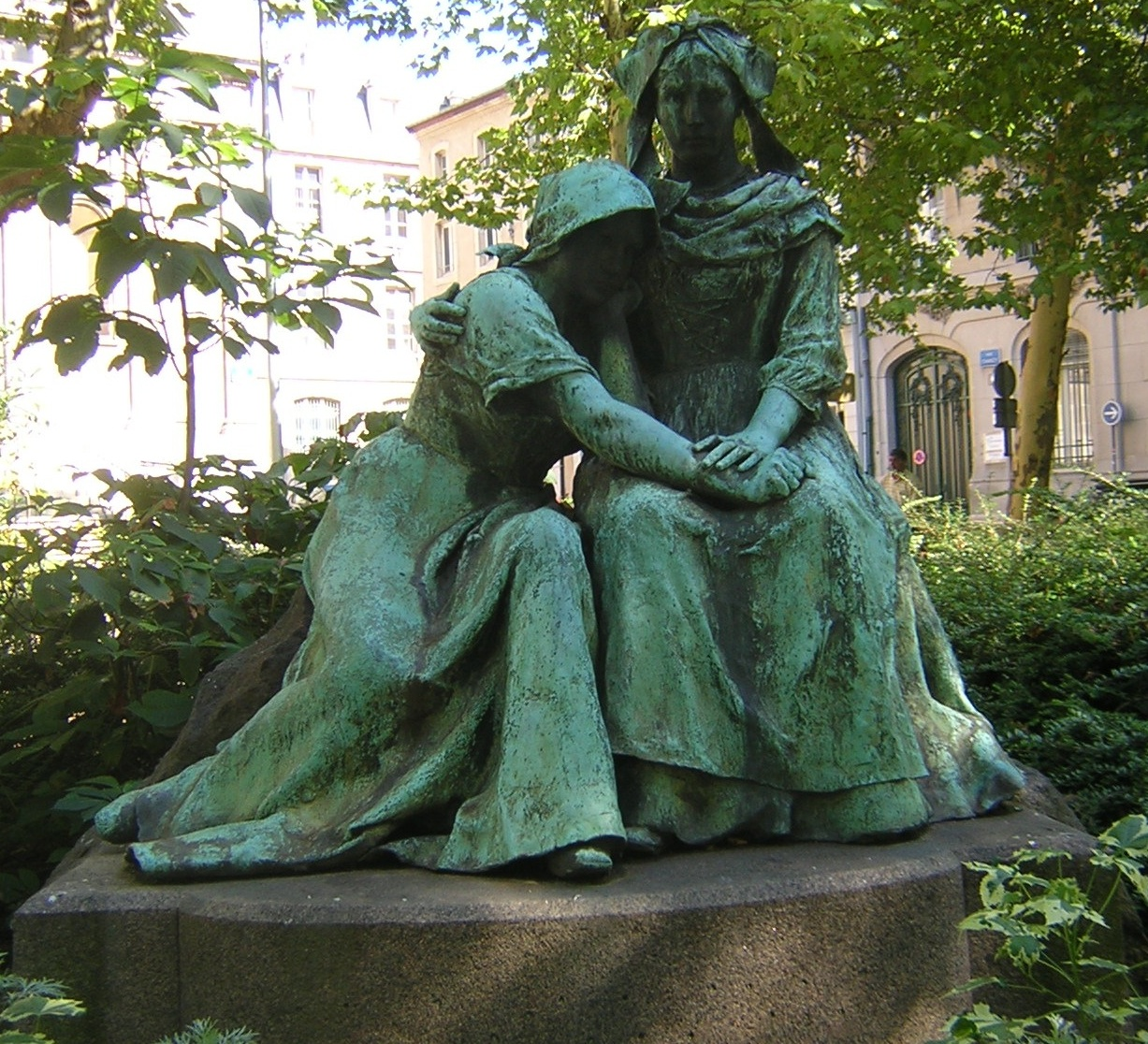
Statue in the Place Maginot in Nancy that personifies the loss of Alsace as the separation of a mother and daughter

The Protesters rejected both cooperation with the German authorities and constructive political work in the Reichstag. They did not attend its sessions after their election (some Lorraine deputies were not able to do so because of their lack of command of German). There were also people in political life who, for various motives, pleaded for an "attitude of reason". The so-called Autonomists were more or less either pro-German or pro-French and strove for a local autonomy of the Imperial Territory that was as far-reaching as possible.

The Protestant minority population voted predominantly for the Autonomists from the 1877 Reichstag election onwards. Over time, however, the population of Alsace–Lorraine turned more and more to the German parties, such as Catholics to the Centre Party, the Protestant bourgeoisie to the Liberals and Conservatives, and the emerging working class to the Social Democrats. The Protesters no longer played a significant role after the election of 1890.

===== Reichstag elections 1874–1912 =====
The majority of Alsace–Lorraine's inhabitants were sceptical of the German Empire during the first two decades and voted for regional parties (Alsace–Lorraine Protesters and Autonomists). After Chancellor Bismarck's dismissal in 1890, the party landscape loosened, and parties of the Empire (Social Democrats, Centre, National Liberals, Left Liberals and Conservatives) found more and more supporters. In the countryside and the predominantly French-speaking electoral districts of Lorraine, the Autonomists remained strong, while in the cities, especially Strassburg, they increasingly played only a subordinate role, with the Social Democrats dominating.

The election results, showing the percentage of votes and the number of seats won (in parentheses), were as follows:

Party / year	1874	1877	1878	1881	1884	1887	1890	1893	1898	1903	1907	1912
Protesters	32.2 (6)	35.7 (5)	31.9 (5)	54.1 (8)	55.6 (9)	59.5 (10)	10.4 (1)	2.7 (1)			0.0 -	4.5 -
Autonomists	19.0 -	26.3 (5)	23.7 (4)	11.3 (1)	8.5 (1)	15.4 -	0.7 -	2.1 -	2.1 -			
Political Catholicism	44.0 (9)	37.3 (5)	32.0 (6)	28.3 (6)	31.9 (5)	22.7 (5)	46.0 (9)	35.3 (7)	14.5 (8)	2.9 (7)	2.5 (1)	
Lorraine Block									11.2 (2)	15.9 (4)	14.1 (3)	7.1 (2)
Conservative Party	2.2 -	0.3 -	12.1 -	3.2 -	1.6 -	1.9 -	12.0 (1)	6.2 (3)	0.3 (2)			
German Reich Party	2.2 -	0.3 -	12.1 -	3.2 -	1.6 -	1.9 -	7.7 (1)	14.6 (1)	9.1 (1)	7.8 (1)	2.8 (1)	2.1 -
National Liberal Party		0.0 -		0.0 -	0.0 -	0.0 -	11.5 (2)	8.5 -	4.7 -	6.0 (1)		
Alsatian Progress Party											17.2 -	19.5 (1)
Free-minded Union									8.2 (1)	6.2 (1)		
Free-minded People's Party								1.9 (1)		0.5 (1)		
German People's Party of Alsace–Lorraine									0.9 -	3.2 -		
Alsace–Lorraine Regional Party / Centre								7.8 -	24.3 -	25.9 -	35.2 (8)	28.5 (7)
Centre Party	0.0 -	0.0 -	0.0 -	2.3 -	0.0 -	0.0 -	2.1 -	0.0 -	0.0 -	7.1 -	4.4 -	5.4 -
Social Democrats of Alsace–Lorraine	0.3 -		0.1 -	0.4 -	1.8 -	0.3 -	10.7 (1)	19.3 (2)	22.7 (1)	24.2 -	23.7 (2)	31.8 (5)
Others	0.7 -	0.6 -	0.2 -	0.6 -	0.8 -	0.2 -	1.1 -	1.9 -	12.0 -	7.0 -	5.9 -	0.2 -
Inhabitants (in 1,000's)	1,550	1,532		1,567		1,564		1,604	1,641	1,719	1,815	1,874
Eligible voters (in %)	20.6	21.6	21.0	19.9	19.5	20.1	20.3	20.3	21.0	21.7	21.9	22.3
Turnout (in %)	76.5	64.2	64.1	54.2	54.7	83.3	60.4	76.4	67.8	77.3	87.3	84.9
	1874	1877	1878	1881	1884	1887	1890	1893	1898	1903	1907	1912

==== Flags ====
The flag of Alsace–Lorraine adopted by its parliament but not accepted by the national government

The imperial service flag used at state institutions in Alsace–Lorraine

The flag used officially in the Imperial Territory was the black-white-red flag of the German Empire. A modified imperial service flag of the Foreign Office was adopted on 29 December 1892 for use at state institutions in Alsace–Lorraine. It was the imperial tri-colour with the imperial eagle in the centre and the crowned escutcheon of Alsace–Lorraine in the upper left corner.

On 25 June 1912, the parliament of the Imperial Territory unanimously approved the proposal for a state flag consisting of the red and white striped flag of Alsace bearing a yellow Lorraine cross in the upper left corner. The decision to adopt the flag was never implemented by government authorities in Berlin. The flag was often raised privately and on semi-official occasions. It was not welcomed by German authorities and the military but was tolerated in part even in wartime.

Unofficially, the traditional red and white territorial flag was popular in Alsace and was often used decoratively and as a postcard motif. It was also sometimes taken as a sign of protest against the German annexation.

==== The military ====
In the decades after 1871, the fortress of Metz was expanded under German rule to become the largest fortification in the world, with a ring of outworks, some of which were located far in advance of the fortifications themselves. Metz became a majority German-speaking city due to the influx of military personnel and other immigrants from the rest of Germany.

When the German Army was formed after the foundation of the Empire, the XV Prussian Army Corps was created from existing troops. The corps' district was the new "Border Region" Alsace–Lorraine, as was that of the XVI Army Corps, which was formed in 1890. The southern regions of the Imperial Territory belonged to the districts of the XIV Army Corps, which was made up in 1871 of troops from Baden. From 1912, the northeastern regions belonged to the XXI Army Corps.

The recruiting districts of the corps were outside Alsace–Lorraine, as was the case with the Upper and Lower Alsatian and Lorraine regiments that were established later within the corps as part of army enlargements. The corps were not always stationed in the Imperial Territory. Alsatians and Lorrainers who were called up for military service were distributed among all Prussian Army units, as were active and passive social democrats, who were also considered to be politically unreliable. It was not until 1903 that a quarter of Alsatian recruits were assigned on a trial basis to troops stationed in their native region.

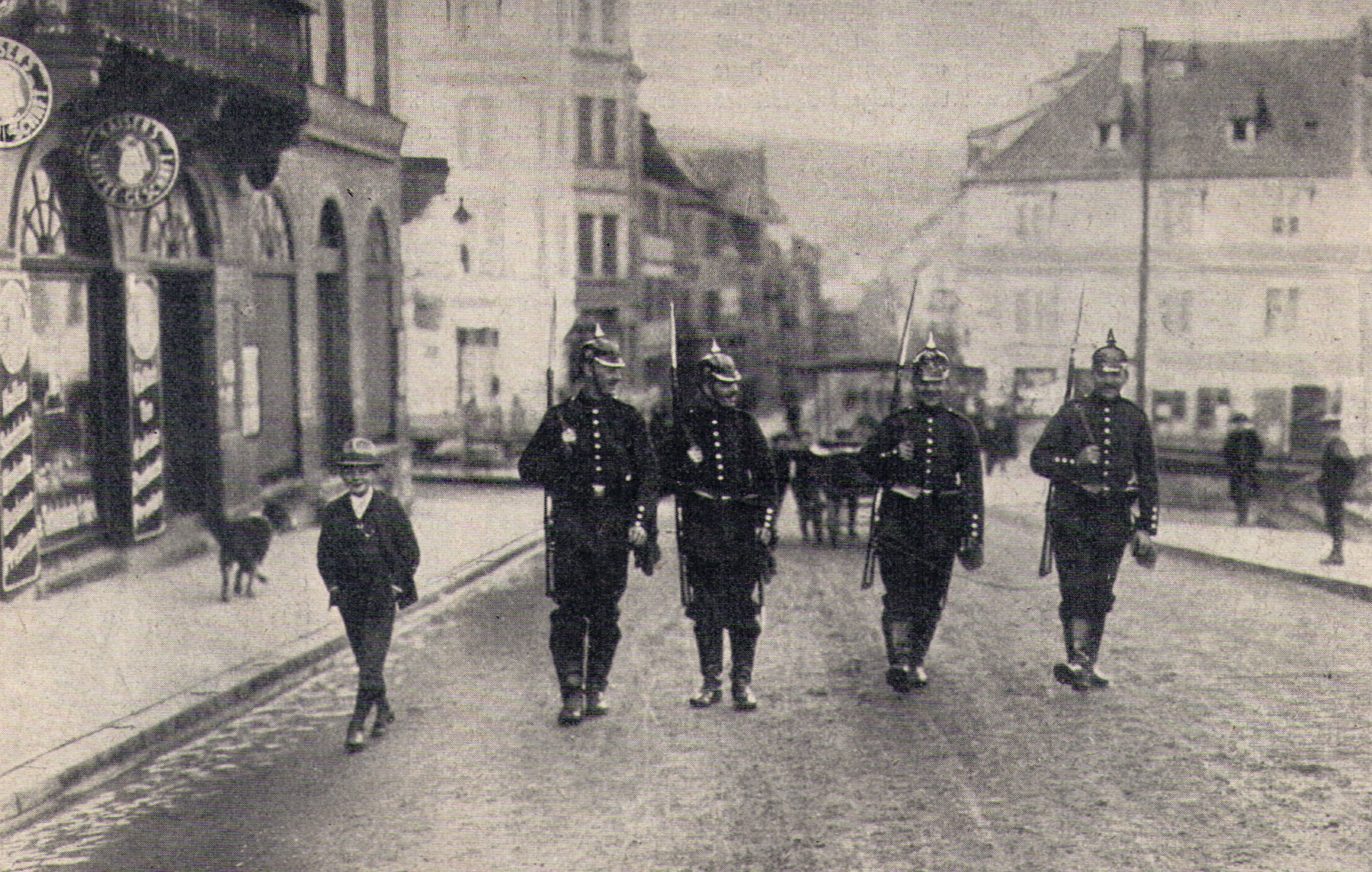
German patrol during the Zabern Affair

In 1910, 4.3% of the local population – about 80,000 men – were military personnel, which made Alsace–Lorraine the region in Germany with the highest concentration of troops.

At the end of 1913, protests broke out in the Alsatian town of Zabern, where two battalions of Prussian infantry were stationed. A young German lieutenant insulted the Alsatian population in a speech to soldiers and called for rebellious Alsatians to be stabbed. In what came to be known as the Zabern Affair, the military reacted to the protests with arbitrary acts that were not covered by law. The assaults led to a Reichstag debate on the militaristic structures of German society and strained the relations between Alsace–Lorraine and the rest of Germany.

==== Economy and culture ====
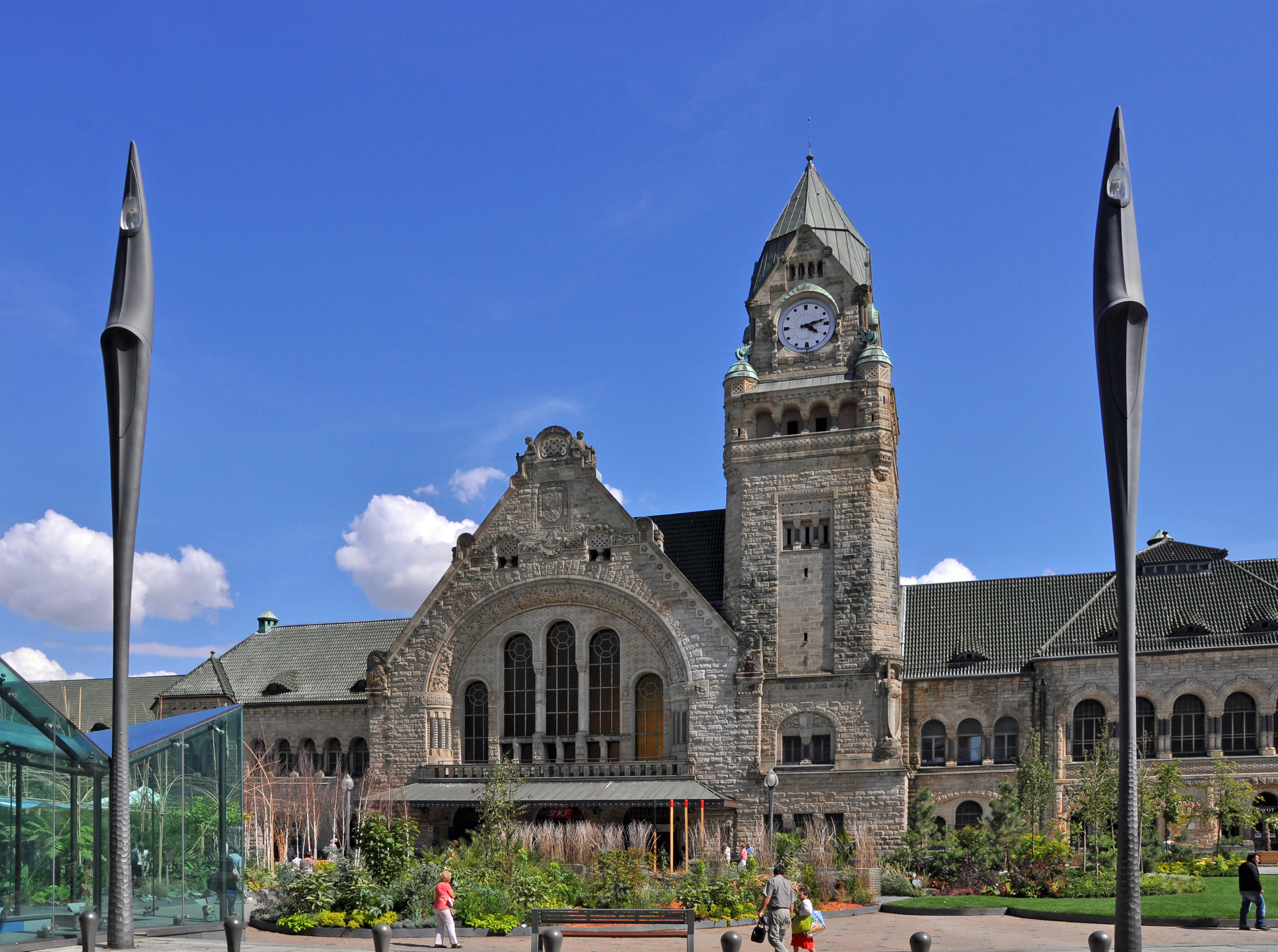
The neo-Romanesque Metz railway station, built in 1908. Kaiser Wilhelm II instigated the construction of various buildings in Alsace–Lorraine that were to be representative of German architecture.

Planning began in 1871 for a strategic railway line from Berlin to Metz in order to integrate the new Imperial Territory militarily and strategically. The "cannon railway" was completed in the 1870s. The railways of the private French Eastern Railway Company (Compagnie des Chemins de Fer de l'Est) – a total of 740 km of lines – were bought by the French state and then sold to Germany for 260 million gold marks. The purchase price was offset against the war compensation to be paid by France. The Imperial Railways in Alsace–Lorraine was the first railway owned by the German Reich.

Until the First World War, the Imperial Territory experienced a great economic boom, and many new socio-political benefits such as social security and health insurance were introduced in line with developments in the rest of the German Empire.

In 1872, the University of Strassburg was re-founded and in 1877 given the name "Emperor Wilhelm University" (after Emperor Wilhelm I). Through generous expansion measures, it developed into one of the largest universities in the Empire. Professional training in Alsace developed as a result of stimuli from Germany. The German administration promoted the education of young Alsatian artists at German universities and academies, giving rise to the Cercle de Saint-Léonard, an artists' association that sought to combine German and Alsatian art.

==== Religion and its role in popular attitudes to the annexation ====
Although the proportion of native speakers of German dialects in the new Imperial Territory was around 90%, Catholics in Alsace–Lorraine tended initially to be sceptical about the ethnographic unification with Germany, which had come about under the leadership of predominately Protestant Prussia. While the Catholics frequently identified with the French Catholic state and feared disadvantage in Prussian hands, the local Protestants were in favour of becoming part of Germany. The Evangelical Lutheran Church professed allegiance to Germany, hoping to reduce French-influenced Catholic "paternalism". The rural population in particular supported their efforts, while quite a few critics of unification spoke out in the cities of Strassburg and Mülhausen.

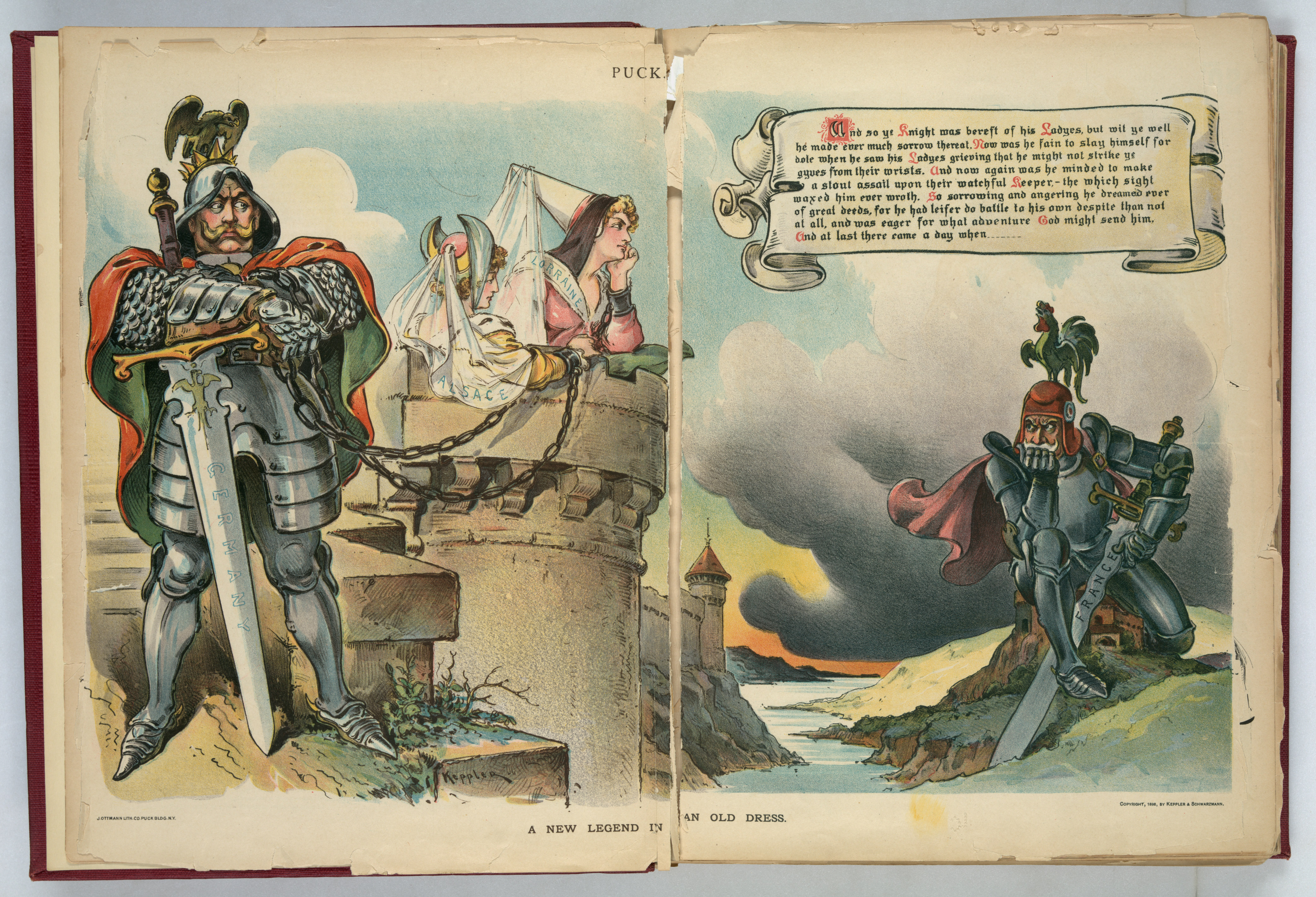
An 1898 American political cartoon that depicts the dispute over Alsace–Lorraine as a medieval romance

After the Kulturkampf – the conflict between the state and the Catholic Church driven by Chancellor Otto von Bismarck – reached Alsace–Lorraine in 1872/73, the Catholic Church became a vehicle of resistance against the German authorities. In all of the Reichstag elections from 1874 to 1912, between three and seven of the 15 Alsace–Lorraine deputies were Catholic priests. The dispute reached a climax when, on 3 August 1873, a pastoral letter from the Bishop of Nancy-Toul calling for prayers for the reunification of Alsace–Lorraine with France was read in the Alsace–Lorraine districts of Château-Salins and Saarburg, which still belonged to his diocese. The German authorities reacted with police measures, arrests and disciplinary proceedings as well as a ban on the Catholic press.

After the beginning of the 20th century, opposition to German authorities played hardly any role. There were no longer major social groups that advocated a return to France. The Protestants traditionally had a positive image of Germany, while after the Dreyfus affair the Jewish population regarded France with extreme suspicion. Catholics also turned away from France. The rise of socialism there permanently unsettled Catholic sentiments in Alsace–Lorraine, and France's laicist policy from 1905 onwards (Law on the Separation of the Churches and the State) also led to Catholic alienation from France. Germany had granted the region significantly more freedom, and the region's economic situation had developed positively. The younger inhabitants, who had had no contact with France, especially saw themselves as Germans as a matter of course.

==== During World War I ====
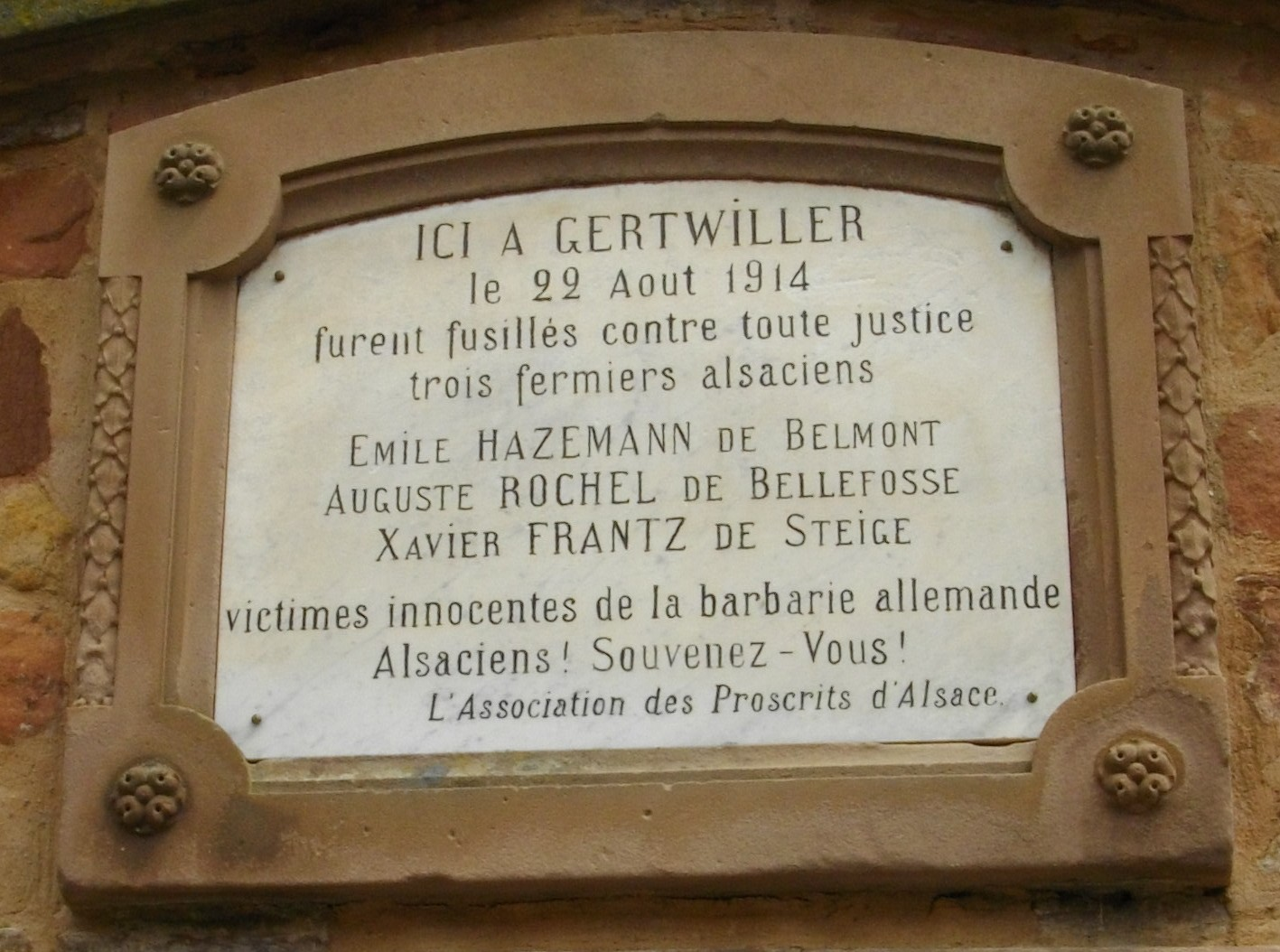
A plaque commemorating the reported murder of three farmers, at Gertwiller, Bas-Rhin, Alsace, just after World War I began. Apart from the victim names, the plaque reads, "ICI A GERTWILLER le 22 Aout 1914 furent fusillés contre tout justice trois fermiers alsaciens... victimes innocentes de la barbarie allemande / Alsaciens! Souvenez Vous! L'Association des Proscrits d'Alsace". [Diacritics, only as appear on the plaque.] Machine translation (Google, October 2025): "HERE IN GERTWILLER on 22 August 1914, three Alsatian farmers were shot against all justice... innocent victims of German barbarity / Alsatians! Remember! The Association of the Outlaws of Alsace".

In French foreign policy, the demand for the return of Alsace and Lorraine faded in importance after 1880 with the decline of the French monarchist element, but when World War I broke out in 1914, recovery of the two lost provinces became the top French war goal.

The increased militarization of Europe and the lack of negotiations between major powers led to harsh and rash actions regarding Alsace–Lorraine being taken by both sides during World War I. As soon as war was declared, both the French and German authorities used the inhabitants of Alsace–Lorraine as propaganda pawns.

Germans living in France were arrested and placed into camps by French authorities. When the French army occupied certain villages, veterans on the German side of the 1870 conflict were sought out and arrested. (Note: In 1914, Albert Schweitzer was put under supervision in Lambaréné, French Equatorial Africa; in 1917, he was taken to France and incarcerated until July 1918.)

The Germans responded to the outbreak of war with harsh measures against the Alsace–Lorraine populace. The Zabern Affair had convinced the high command that the population was hostile to the German Empire and that it should be forced into submission. German troops occupied some homes. The German military feared that French partisans – called francs-tireurs during the Franco-Prussian War – would reappear.

German authorities developed policies aimed at reducing the influence of French. In Metz, street names had been sign-posted in French and German; French was suppressed in January 1915. On 15 July 1915, German became the only official language in the region, leading to the Germanization of towns' names from 2 September 1915.

Prohibiting the speaking of French in public further increased the exasperation of some of the natives, who were long accustomed to mixing their conversation with French language; the use of even one word, as innocent as "bonjour", could incur a fine. (Note: For example, the entry for 26 October 1914 in Spindler's journal reads: Then he advises me to speak no French. The streets are infested with informers, men and women who reach for rewards and make arrests of passers-by for a simple "merci" said in French. It goes without saying that these measures incite people's joker spirit. A woman at the market, who probably was unaware that "bonchour" and "merci" are French, was taken to task by a German woman, because she answered her "Guten Tag" with a "bonchour". Then the good woman, with her fists on her hips, challenges her client in colloquial Alemannic German: "Jetz grad genua mit dene dauwe Plän! Wisse Sie was? Leeke Sie mich...! Esch des am End au franzêsch?" ["I've had enough of your stupid yammering! Do you know what? Kiss my...! Is that last bit French too?"] — Charles Spindler, L'Alsace pendant la guerre) Some ethnic Germans in the region cooperated in the persecution as a way to demonstrate German patriotism. (Note: We can read in L'Alsace pendant la guerre how the exasperation of the population gradually increased. On 29 September 1914, Spindler heard a characteristic statement:...the interior decorator H., who repairs the mattresses of the Ott house, said to me this morning: "If only it was the will of God that we became French again, and that these damned Schwowebittel were thrown out of the country! And then, you know, there are chances that it happens". It is the first time since the war I heard an ordinary man frankly expressing this wish. — Charles Spindler, L'Alsace pendant la guerre)

German authorities became increasingly worried about renewed French nationalism. The governor stated in February 1918: "Sympathies towards France and repulsion for Germans have penetrated to a frightening depth the petty bourgeoisie and the peasantry." But in order to spare them possible confrontations with relatives in France and also to avoid any desertion of Alsatian soldiers to the French army, (Note: One of the famous cases was the desertion of all the Alsatian soldiers from their German battalion on the eve of the Verdun offensive to warn the French army of the imminent attack.) German Army draftees from Alsace–Lorraine were sent mainly to the Eastern front or to the Navy (Kaiserliche Marine). About 15,000 Alsatians and Lorrainers served in the German Navy.

=== Annexation to the French Republic ===
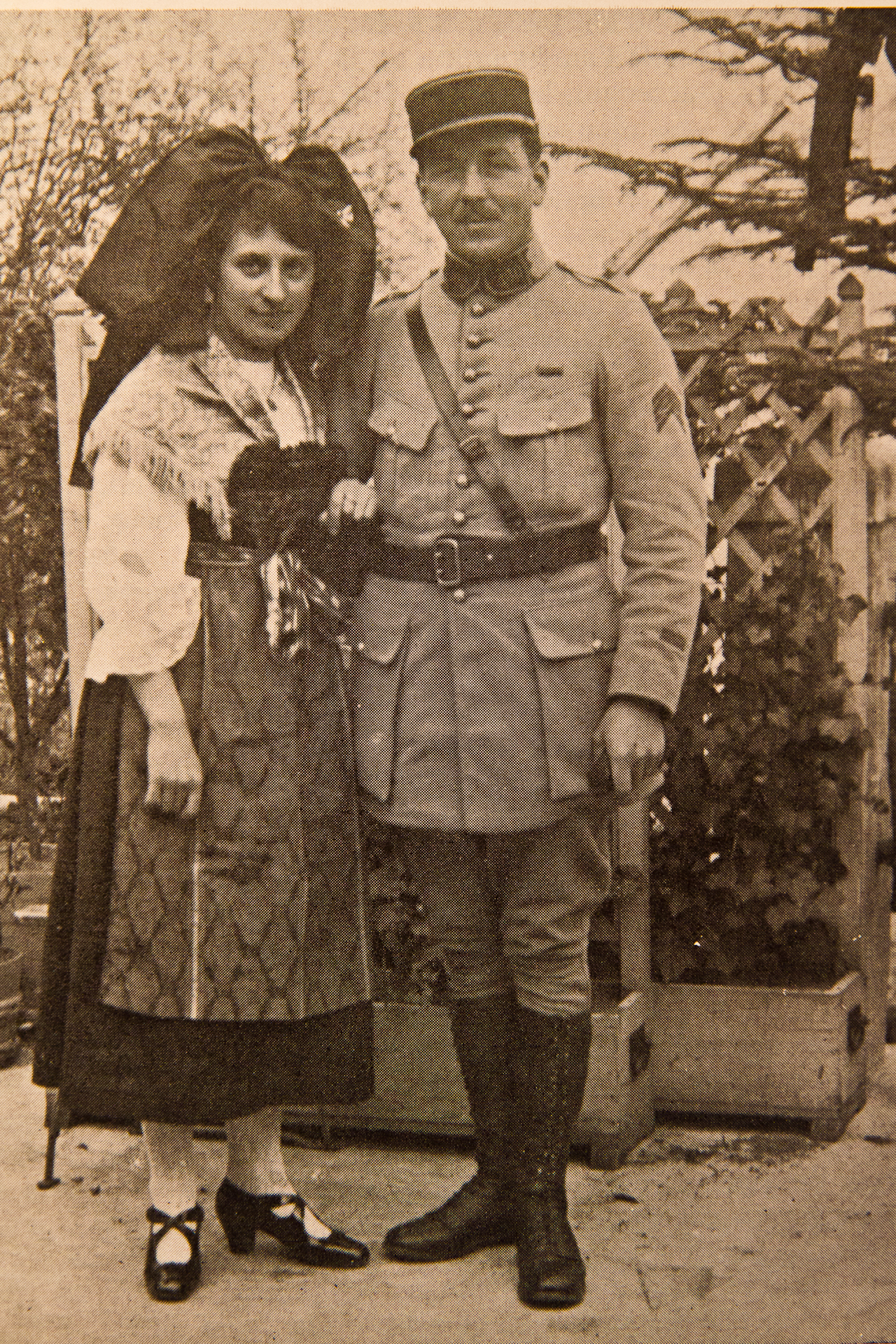
An Alsatian woman in traditional dress and a French officer, c. 1919

In the general revolutionary atmosphere of the expiring German Empire, Marxist councils of workers and soldiers (Soldaten- und Arbeiterräte) formed in Mulhouse, Colmar, and Strasbourg in November 1918, in imitation of the soviets of revolutionary Russia, and in parallel to other such bodies set up in Germany.

Metz and the Lorraine returned to France, front page of Le Petit Journal dated 8 December 1918

In this chaotic situation, the Alsace–Lorraine's state parliament proclaimed itself the supreme authority of the land with the name of Nationalrat, the Strasbourg Soviet proclaimed the Alsace-Lorraine Soviet Republic, however Jacques Peirotes, the SPD Reichstag representative for Colmar, announced the establishment of French rule, urging Paris to send troops quickly.

The soviet councils disbanded themselves with the departure of the German troops between 16 and 20 November. The arrival of the French Army stabilized the situation: French troops put the region under military occupation and entered Strasbourg on 22 November. The Nationalrat proclaimed the annexation of Alsace to France on 5 December. The Soviet Republic came to an end, but the annexation was not internationally recognized until the Treaty of Versailles was concluded in 1919.

France divided Alsace–Lorraine into the départements of Haut-Rhin, Bas-Rhin, and Moselle, the same political structure as before the annexation and as created by the French Revolution, but with slightly different limits. Even today, laws in the three regions are somewhat different from the rest of France. The specific provisions in force are known as the local law in Alsace–Moselle.

The département Meurthe-et-Moselle was maintained even after France recovered Alsace–Lorraine in 1919. The area of Belfort became a special status area and was not reintegrated into Haut-Rhin in 1919, but instead was made a full status département in 1922 under the name Territoire-de-Belfort. (Note: As an artifact of its prior alignment, the name of Belfort is still seen on the Colmar prefecture building is a sous-prefecture remnant.)

The French government immediately started a Francization campaign that included the forced deportation of all Germans who had settled in the area after 1870. For that purpose, the population was divided in four categories: A (French citizens before 1870), B (their descendants), C (citizens of Allied or neutral states), and D (enemy aliens—Germans). By July 1921, 111,915 people categorized as "D" were expelled to Germany. All place names were gallicized (e.g., Strassburg → Strasbourg, Mülhausen → Mulhouse, Schlettstadt → Sélestat, etc.).

=== World War II ===
==== Evacuation and deportations ====
On 1 September 1939, the day World War II started, residents of Alsace and Moselle living in the Franco-German border region were evacuated. This comprised about one third of the population of Alsace and Moselle, or about 600,000 residents. The evacuation was aimed at providing space for military operations and for protecting citizens from attack. The evacuees were allowed to return in July 1940, after France surrendered to Germany.

The area then came under German occupation. Nazi laws against homosexuality were applied to Alsace–Moselle, and homosexuals were deported. The Nazis also deported refugee and resident Jews, mostly to concentration camps.

==== German control and the Malgré-nous ====
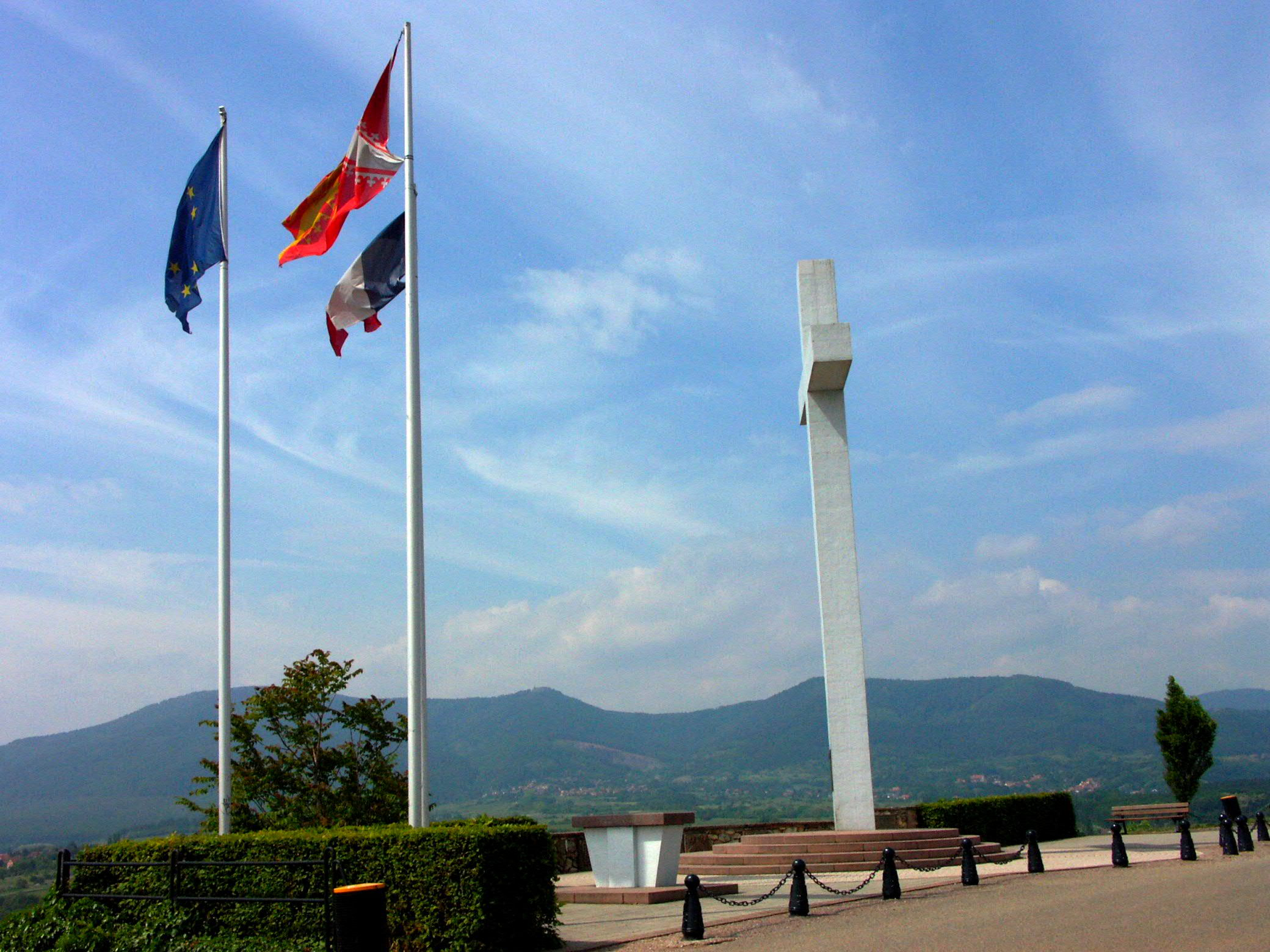
Monument to the Malgré-nous in Obernai, Alsace

After the defeat of France in the spring of 1940, Alsace and Moselle were not formally annexed by Nazi Germany, which nonetheless exercised de facto control. Although the terms of the armistice specified that the integrity of the whole French territory could not be modified in any way, Adolf Hitler, the German Führer, drafted an annexation law in 1940 that he kept secret, expecting to announce it in the event of a German victory. (Note: Jäckel (1966) § "La France dans l'Europe de Hitler") Alsace and Moselle were each placed under a Chief of Civil Administration (CdZ), who was the Nazi Party Gauleiter and Reichsstatthalter (Reich Governor) of the adjacent German territory. Alsace was administered as part of Gau Baden under Robert Heinrich Wagner and his deputy, Hermann Röhn. Moselle was administered as part of the Gau Saarpfalz, (later Gau Westmark) under Josef Bürckel and his deputy, Ernst Ludwig Leyser. Beginning in 1942, people from Alsace and Moselle were made German citizens by decree of the Nazi government.

Beginning in October 1942, young Alsatian and Lorrainian men were conscripted into the German armed forces. Sometimes they were known as the malgré-nous, which could be translated into English as "against our will". (Note: The term actually appeared after World War I.) A small minority volunteered, notably the author of The Forgotten Soldier, known by the pseudonym Guy Sajer. Ultimately 100,000 Alsatians and 30,000 Mosellans were enrolled, many of them to fight against the Soviet Red Army, on Germany's eastern front. Most of those who survived the war were interned in Tambov in Russia in 1945. Many others fought in Normandy against the Allies as the malgré-nous of the 2nd SS Panzer Division Das Reich, some of whom were involved in the Oradour sur Glane and Tulle war crimes.

== Demographics ==
=== Languages used ===
==== Currently ====
The German-linked Alsatian dialect remains the lingua franca of the region, although perhaps used more by older people. Both French and German are taught in the schools.

==== First language use historically (1900) ====
- German and Germanic dialects: 1,492,347 (86.8%)
- Other languages: 219,638 (12.8%)
  - French and Romance dialects: 198,318 (11.5%)
  - Italian: 18,750 (1.1%)
  - German and a second language: 7,485 (0.4%)
  - Polish: 1,410 (0.1%)

=== Religion ===
When Alsace and the Lorraine department became part of Germany, the French laws regarding religious bodies were preserved, with special privileges to the then recognised religions of Calvinism, Judaism, Lutheranism and Roman Catholicism, under a system known as the Concordat. However, the Roman Catholic dioceses of Metz and of Strasbourg became exempt jurisdictions. The Church of Augsburg Confession of France, with its directory, supreme consistory and the bulk of its parishioners residing in Alsace, was reorganised as the Protestant Church of Augsburg Confession of Alsace and Lorraine (EPCAAL) in 1872, but territorially confined to Alsace–Lorraine only. The five local Calvinist consistories, originally part of the Reformed Church of France, formed a statewide synod in 1895, the Protestant Reformed Church of Alsace and Lorraine (EPRAL). The three Israelite consistories in Colmar, Metz and Strasbourg were disentangled from supervision by the Israelite Central Consistory of France and continued as separate statutory corporations which never formed a joint body, but cooperated. All the mentioned religious bodies retained the status as établissements publics de culte (public bodies of religion). When the new Alsace–Lorraine constitution of 1911 provided for a bicameral state parliament (Landtag of Alsace–Lorraine), each recognised religion was entitled to send a representative into the first chamber of the Landtag as ex officio members (the bishops of Strasbourg and of Metz, the presidents of EPCAAL and EPRAL, and a delegate of the three Israelite consistories).

==== Religious statistics in 1910 ====
The population in 1910 was 1,874,014, which broke down according to religions, thus:

- Catholic: 76.22%,
- Protestant: 21.78% (18.87% Lutherans, 2.91% Calvinists),
- Jewish: 1.63%,
- Other Christian: 0.21%, and
- Atheist: 0.12%.

=== Statistics (1866–2018) ===
Year	Population	Cause of change
1866	1,596,198	–
1875	1,531,804	After incorporation into the German Empire, 100,000 to 130,000 people left for France and French Algeria
1910	1,874,014	+0.58% population growth per year during 1875–1910
1921	1,709,749	Death of young men in the German army (1914–1918); deportation of persons considered German by the French authorities.
1936	1,915,627	+0.76% population growth per year during 1921–1936
1946	1,767,131	Death of young men in the French army in 1939–1945; death of young men in the German army in 1942–1945; death of civilians and many people still refugees in the rest of France
1975	2,523,703	+1.24% population growth per year during 1946–1975, a period of rapid population and economic growth in France known as the Trente Glorieuses
2018	2,942,057	+0.36% population growth per year during 1975–2018, a period marked by deindustrialization, rising unemployment (particularly in Moselle), and the migration of many people from northern and north-eastern France to the milder winters and economic dynamism of the Mediterranean and Atlantic regions of France

=== Languages ===
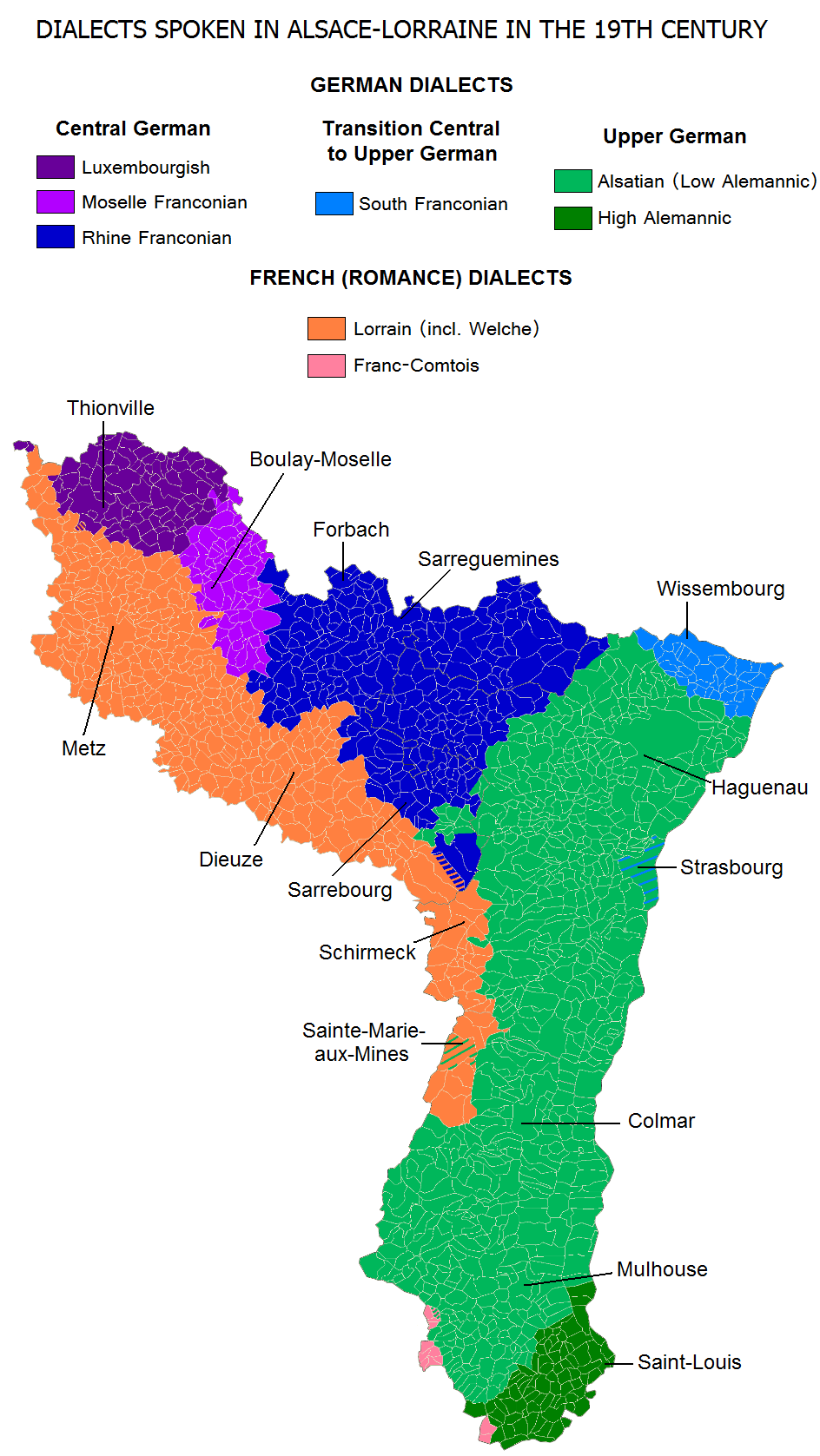
Spatial distribution of dialects in Alsace–Lorraine in the 19th century before the expansion of standard French in the 20th century

Both Germanic and Romance dialects were traditionally spoken in Alsace–Lorraine before the 20th century.

Germanic dialects:

- Central German dialects:
  - Luxembourgish Franconian aka Luxembourgish in the north-west of Moselle (Lothringen) around Thionville (Diddenuewen in the local Luxembourgish dialect) and Sierck-les-Bains (Siirk in the local Luxembourgish dialect).
  - Moselle Franconian in the central northern part of Moselle around Boulay-Moselle (Bolchin in the local Moselle Franconian dialect) and Bouzonville (Busendroff in the local Moselle Franconian dialect).
  - Rhine Franconian in the north-east of Moselle around Forbach (Fuerboch in the local Rhine Franconian dialect), Bitche (Bitsch in the local Rhine Franconian dialect), and Sarrebourg (Saarbuerj in the local Rhine Franconian dialect), as well as in the north-west of Alsace around Sarre-Union (Buckenum in the local Rhine Franconian dialect) and La Petite-Pierre (Lítzelstain in the local Rhine Franconian dialect).
- Transitional between Central German and Upper German:
  - South Franconian in the northernmost part of Alsace around Wissembourg (Waisseburch in the local South Franconian dialect).
- Upper German dialects:
  - Alsatian in the largest part of Alsace and in a few villages around Phalsbourg in the extreme south-east of Moselle. Alsatian was the most spoken dialect in Alsace–Lorraine.
  - High Alemannic in the southernmost part of Alsace, around Saint-Louis and Ferrette (Pfirt in the local High Alemannic dialect).

Romance dialects (belonging to the langues d'oïl like French):

- Lorrain in roughly the southern half of Moselle, including its capital Metz, as well as in some valleys of the Vosges Mountains in the west of Alsace around Schirmeck and Sainte-Marie-aux-Mines.
- Franc-Comtois in 12 villages in the extreme south-west of Alsace.

== See also ==
- Alsace and Moselle railway network
- Alsace–Lorraine Regional Party
- Annexations of Alsace–Lorraine
- Gare de Metz-Ville
- German Lorraine
- Independent Regional Party for Alsace–Lorraine
- Moselle (department)
- Unification of Germany
- Territorial losses of Germany in the 20th century
