= Joseph Rossé =

French politician (1892–1951)

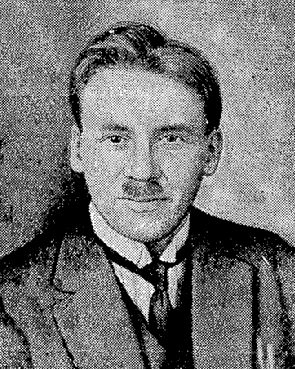
- Joseph Rossé in 1929

Deputy for Haut-Rhin
- In office June 1, 1932 – May 31, 1942
- Preceded by: René Hauss
- Succeeded by: Constituency abolished
- Constituency: Haut-Rhin
- In office June 1, 1928 – November 8, 1928
- Preceded by: New constituency
- Succeeded by: René Hauss
- Constituency: Haut-Rhin

Personal details
- Born: August 26, 1892 Montreux-Vieux, Haut-Rhin, Alsace-Lorraine
- Died: October 24, 1951 (aged 59) Villeneuve-sur-Lot, Lot-et-Garonne, France
- Party: Union populaire républicaine

Joseph Rossé (August 26, 1892 – October 24, 1951) was an Alsatian politician and autonomist, notable for his engagement in the Union Populaire Républicaine and his controversial role during and after the Second World War.

== Early life and education ==
Rossé was born in Montreux-Vieux, then part of Alsace-Lorraine under German rule. Raised in a Catholic family, he became trilingual in French, German, and Alsatian. After the region returned to France following World War I, he became a teacher at the École primaire supérieure in Colmar.

Rossé experienced professional discrimination compared to his colleagues from mainland France, particularly in salary discrepancies. This fueled his involvement in trade unionism and later in the regionalist movement, advocating for the preservation of Alsace's linguistic and religious traditions.

== Political career ==
In 1928, Rossé was elected as a deputy for Haut-Rhin, representing the Union Populaire Républicaine. That same year, he was implicated in the Komplottprozess in Colmar, where he and other regionalists were accused of conspiring against the French state. Rossé was convicted of "plotting against state security" and briefly imprisoned before being pardoned.

Despite these setbacks, Rossé was re-elected in 1932 and again in 1936, serving as part of the Républicains du centre and later the Indépendants d'action populaire parliamentary groups. He was a staunch pacifist and supported the Munich Agreement in 1938.

== World War II and controversy ==
At the outbreak of World War II, Rossé was arrested on charges of collaboration with Nazi Germany. In 1940, after the German invasion, he and other detainees were freed by German forces. He subsequently signed the "Manifesto of the Trois-Épis," which advocated for Alsace's annexation to Germany, though he did so under duress.

Rossé later managed the publishing house ALSATIA, where he clandestinely published Catholic and anti-Nazi literature. He also maintained connections with the German resistance, including Claus von Stauffenberg. He would continue to advocate for greater Alsatican automony.

== Post-war ==
Following the liberation of France, Rossé was arrested and tried for collaboration. In 1947, he was sentenced to 15 years of forced labor. He died in 1951 while imprisoned in Villeneuve-sur-Lot.

Rossé's role during the war remains controversial. While some view him as a victim of his circumstances, others criticize his perceived collaboration. In 2016, a group in Colmar began efforts to rehabilitate his memory.
