= Montreux-Vieux =

Commune in Grand Est, France

- Commune
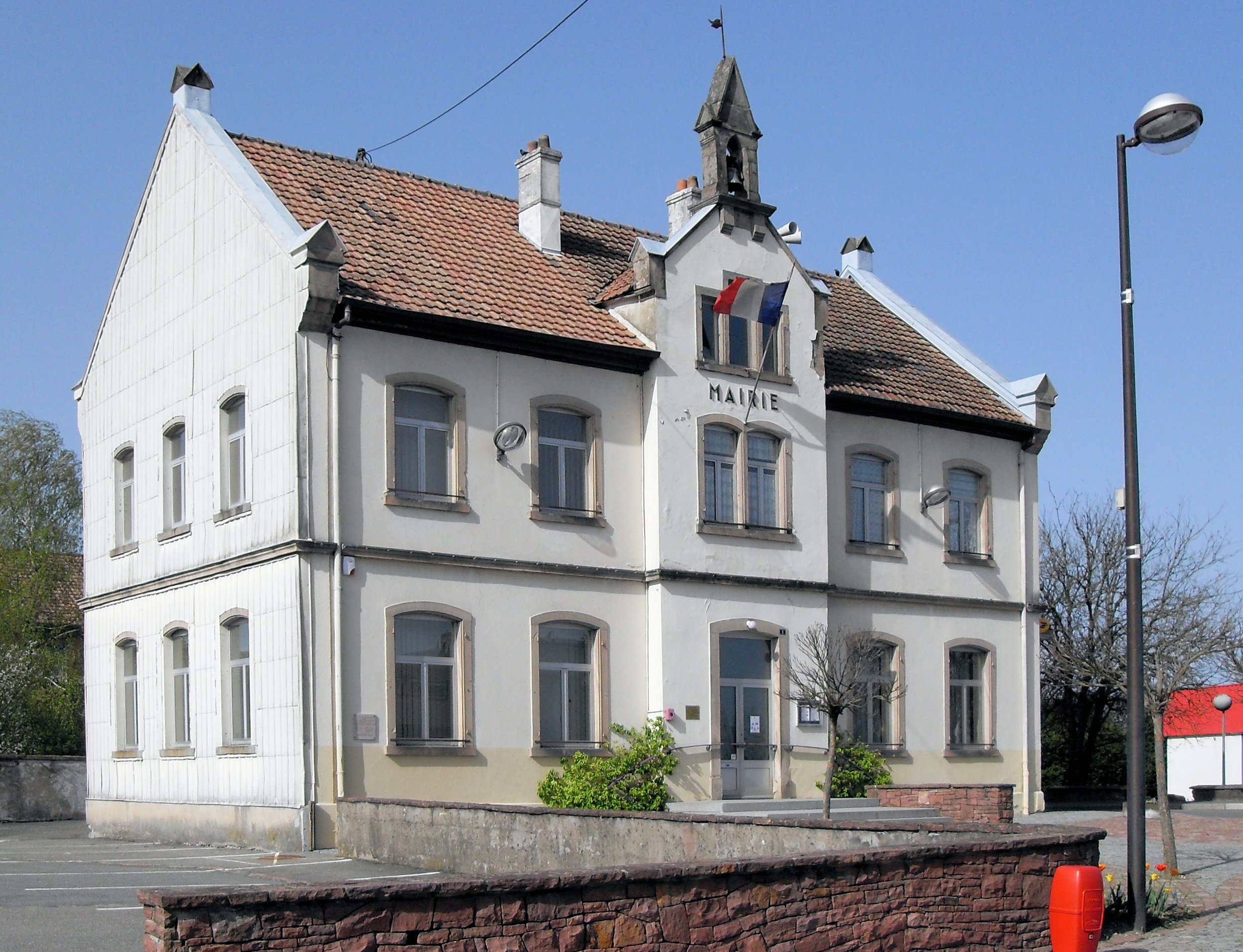
- The town hall in Montreux-Vieux

- Coat of arms
- Location of Montreux-Vieux
- Location within France Location within Grand Est
- Coordinates: 47°37′12″N 7°01′21″E
- Country: France
- Region: Grand Est
- Department: Haut-Rhin
- Arrondissement: Altkirch
- Canton: Masevaux-Niederbruck
- Intercommunality: CC Sud Alsace Largue

Government
  - Mayor (2020–2026): Jean-Claude Ringwald
- Area^{1}: 4.14 km^{2} (1.60 sq mi)
- Elevation: 355 m (1,165 ft)
- Highest elevation: 361 m (1,184 ft)
- Lowest elevation: 338 m (1,109 ft)
- Population (2023): 928
  - Density: 224/km^{2} (581/sq mi)
- Time zone: UTC+01:00 (CET)
  - Summer (DST): UTC+02:00 (CEST)
- INSEE/Postal code: 68215 /68210
- ^{1} French Land Register data, which excludes lakes, ponds, glaciers > 1 km^{2} (0.386 sq mi or 247 acres) and river estuaries.

Montreux-Vieux (French pronunciation: [mɔ̃tʁø vjø]; German: Altmünsterol; Alsatian: Àltmìnschtràl) is a commune in the Haut-Rhin department and Grand Est region of north-eastern France.

== People ==
- Hans Paetsch, German actor and speaker, born here

== See also ==
- Communes of the Haut-Rhin département
