= Xavier Haegy =

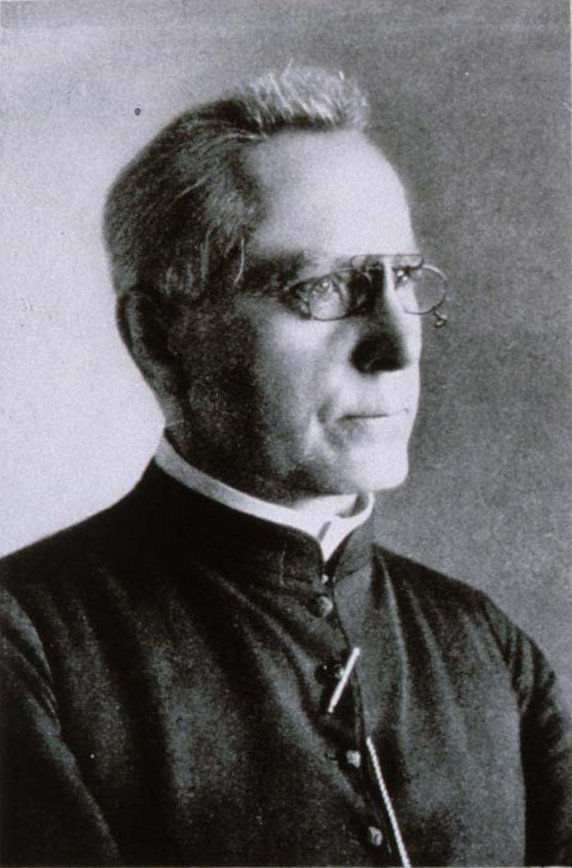
Xavier Haegy

Xavier Joseph Haegy (December 2, 1870, Hirsingue – May 11, 1932) was an Alsatian priest, journalist and politician. A staunch proponent of Alsatian regionalism, Haegy was a major media proprietor in Alsace and was elected deputy of the Zentrumspartei in 1913–18.

== Life ==
Born in Hirsingue, he was the sworn enemy of the abbé Wetterlé and was an ardent Francophobe of peasant origin who was more at ease speaking with peasants than in the salons of Strasbourg. As a result, he had a great deal of popular success while at the same time remaining limited in his appeal to the bourgeoisie of Alsace. Stubborn on the point of dogma, he was nevertheless fairly liberal on social matters and attempted to promote Catholic syndicalism. He died in Colmar.
