= Daniel Hoeffel =

French politician (1929–2025)

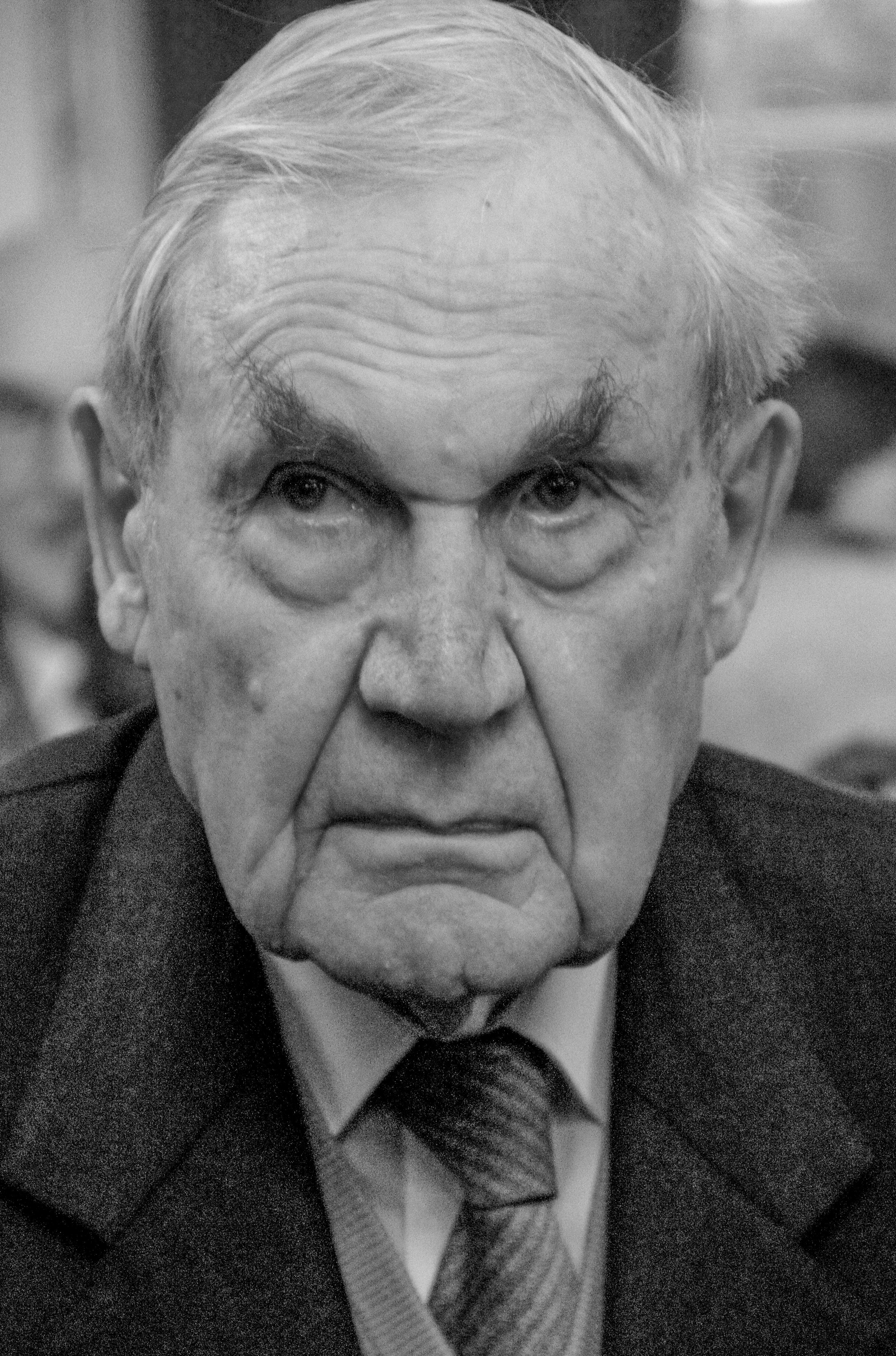
- Hoeffel in 2013

Member of the French Senate for Bas-Rhin
- In office 2 October 1995 – 30 September 2004
- Preceded by: Jean-Paul Hammann
- Succeeded by: Roland Ries
- In office 28 September 1981 – 29 April 1993
- Preceded by: Jean-Paul Hammann
- Succeeded by: Jean-Paul Hammann
- In office 3 October 1977 – 5 May 1978
- Preceded by: Michel Kauffmann
- Succeeded by: Jean-Paul Hammann

Minister of Transport
- In office 2 October 1980 – 2 May 1981
- President: Valéry Giscard d'Estaing
- Preceded by: Joël Le Theule
- Succeeded by: Louis Mermaz

Member of the Parliamentary Assembly of the Council of Europe
- In office 9 November 1995 – 8 November 2001

Personal details
- Born: Daniel Timothée Paul Hoeffel; 23 January 1929 Strasbourg, France
- Died: 14 October 2025 (aged 96) Strasbourg, France
- Party: CDS; UDF; UMP
- Education: Institut d'études politiques de Strasbourg

Daniel Timothée Paul Hoeffel (French: [danjɛl timɔte pɔl ɔfɛl]; 23 January 1929 – 14 October 2025) was a French politician of the Centre of Social Democrats (CDS), the Union for French Democracy (UDF), and the Union for a Popular Movement (UMP).

Hoeffel was notably the son of politician Robert Hoeffel and grew up in an Alsatian Protestant family.

He served as Minister of Transport from 1980 to 1981 under third government of Prime Minister Raymond Barre. From 1995 to 2001, he represented France in the Parliamentary Assembly of the Council of Europe. He represented Bas-Rhin in the Senate from 1977 to 1978, 1981 to 1993, and 1995 to 2004.

Hoeffel died in Strasbourg on 14 October 2025, at the age of 96.
