= Joseph Ostermann =

French insurance agent and politician (1937–2023)

Member of the Senate of France for Bas-Rhin
- In office 4 November 1991 – 30 November 2004

Mayor of Wasselonne
- In office 1977–2014
- Preceded by: Robert Beck
- Succeeded by: Michèle Eschlimann

Personal details
- Born: 26 November 1937
- Died: 21 October 2023 (aged 85)
- Party: RPR; UMP
- Occupation: Insurance agent

Joseph Ostermann (26 November 1937 – 21 October 2023) was a French insurance agent and politician of the Rally for the Republic (RPR) and the UMP.

== Biography ==
Born on 26 November 1937, Ostermann grew up in a family of farmers from Nordheim with eight total children. He served in the military during the Algerian War in 1962 and served in the General Council of the Canton of Wasselonne from 1973 to 2011. He was also Mayor of Wasselonne from 1977 to 2014. From 1991 to 2004, he served in the Senate from Bas-Rhin.

Joseph Ostermann died on 21 October 2023, at the age of 85.
