= Louis Jung =

French politician

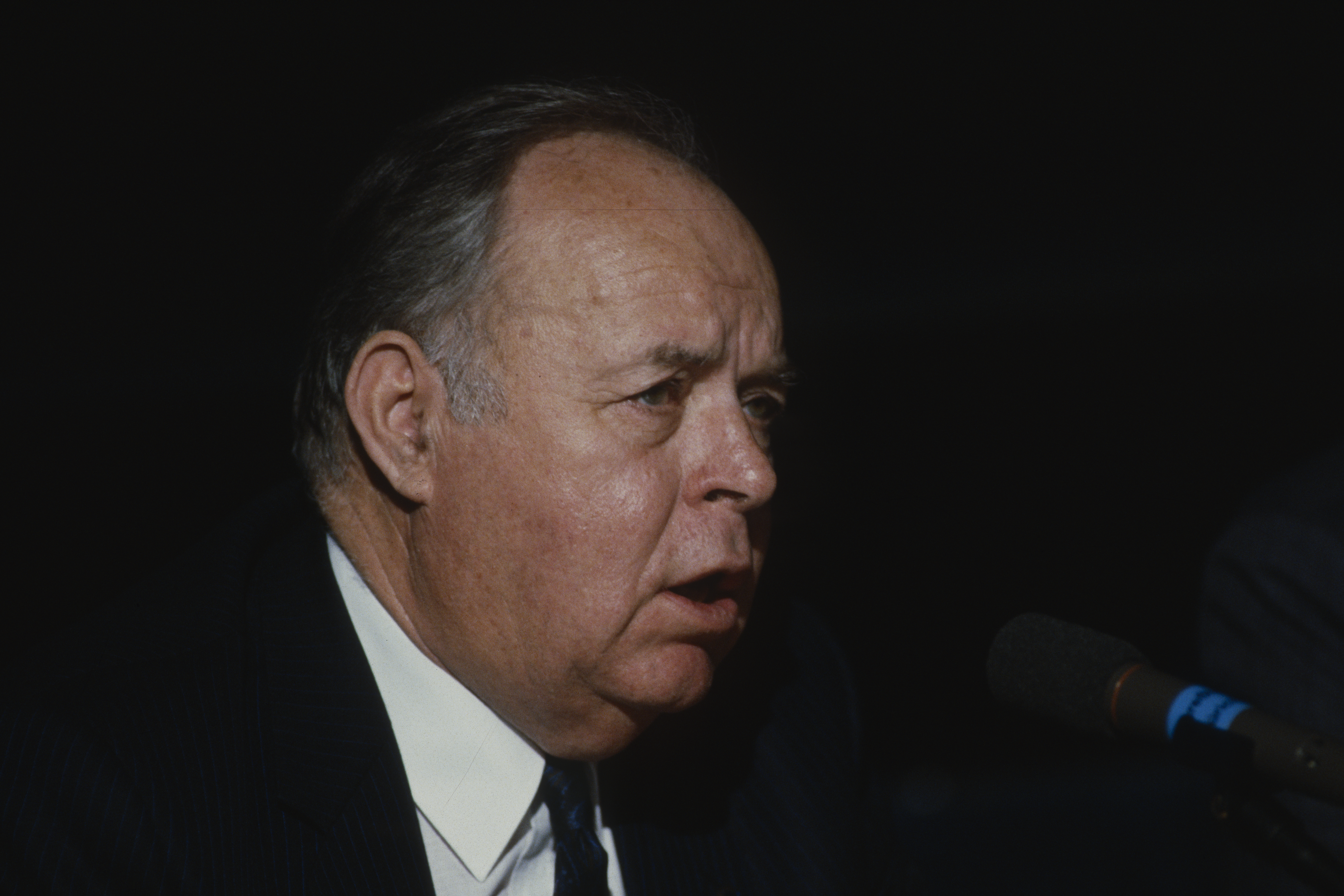
Louis Jung (1986)

Louis Jung (18 February 1917 – 22 October 2015) was a French politician who was a Senator and later the President of the Parliamentary Assembly of the Council of Europe.
