= Popular Republican Union (1919–1946) =

Popular Republican Union Union populaire républicaine
- President: Joseph Rossé
- Founded: 1919
- Dissolved: 1946
- Split from: Centre Party
- Preceded by: Alsace-Lorraine Regional Party
- Merged into: Popular Republican Movement
- Headquarters: Strasbourg, Alsace
- Ideology: Christian democracy Social conservatism
- Political position: Centre-right
- Regional affiliation: Volksfront

The Popular Republican Union (French: Union populaire républicaine, UPR) was a Christian democratic party in Alsace, France during the Third Republic.

The UPR became the dominant party in Alsace during the Interwar era. In Lorraine, the Lorrain Republican Union (URL) was considered the UPR's sister party.

Founded in 1919, the UPR attracted most of the Alsatian adherents of the Catholic Centre Party in Alsace-Lorraine, formed since the mid-1890s, forming with 31% of the seats the strongest party in the Landtag of the former Alsace-Lorraine.

Ideologically, the UPR was much more conservative than the social-Catholic Popular Democratic Party, but more moderate than the main French Catholic party, the Republican Federation.

During the 1920s its members had largely sat in parliament among the Republican Federation group. Considering this to have grown too right-wing, French-nationalist and centralist, they set up their own parliamentary group: the Republicans of the Centre (1932 to 1936) and the Independents of Popular Action (1936 to 1940).

The UPR, URL, and PDP merged in 1946 to the create the Popular Republican Movement (MRP).
