= Alsace–Lorraine Regional Party =

Catholic political party in the German Empire

The Alsace-Lorraine Regional Party (German: Elsaß-Lothringische Landespartei) was a Catholic political party in the Imperial Province of Alsace-Lorraine, Germany in the early 1900s. The party was founded in March 1903. It was the first Catholic political organization in Alsace-Lorraine. Léon Vonderscheer, a lawyer by profession, was the president of the party, while Hauss was the party secretary.

The party was founded in reaction to the advances of the SPD in Alsace-Lorraine. However, following the formation of the regional party (Landespartei), different liberal factions regrouped to form a political party of their own to confront the Landespartei.

The party won seven out of eleven Alsace-Lorraine seats in the 1903 election in the Reichstag. In Kolmar, Preiss of the Landespartei was elected, defeating the People's Party leader Blumentahl. Blumentahl did however also contest the Strassburg constituency, where he defeated the Landespartei candidate Hauss (the party secretary).

In Haut-Rhin, the party was supported by the newspaper Elsäßer Kurier whilst in Bas-Rhin it was supported by Unterländer-Kurier.

In December 1905 Léon Vonderscheer joined the Reichstag group of the Centre Party, being the first Alsatian Catholic politician to do so. In 1906 the party merged into the Centre Party, becoming its branch in Alsace-Lorraine. The party did however retain a degree of independence towards the all-German Centre Party. For example, their Reichstag deputies did not join the Centre Party faction en bloc.
