= Ferrette =

- Commune
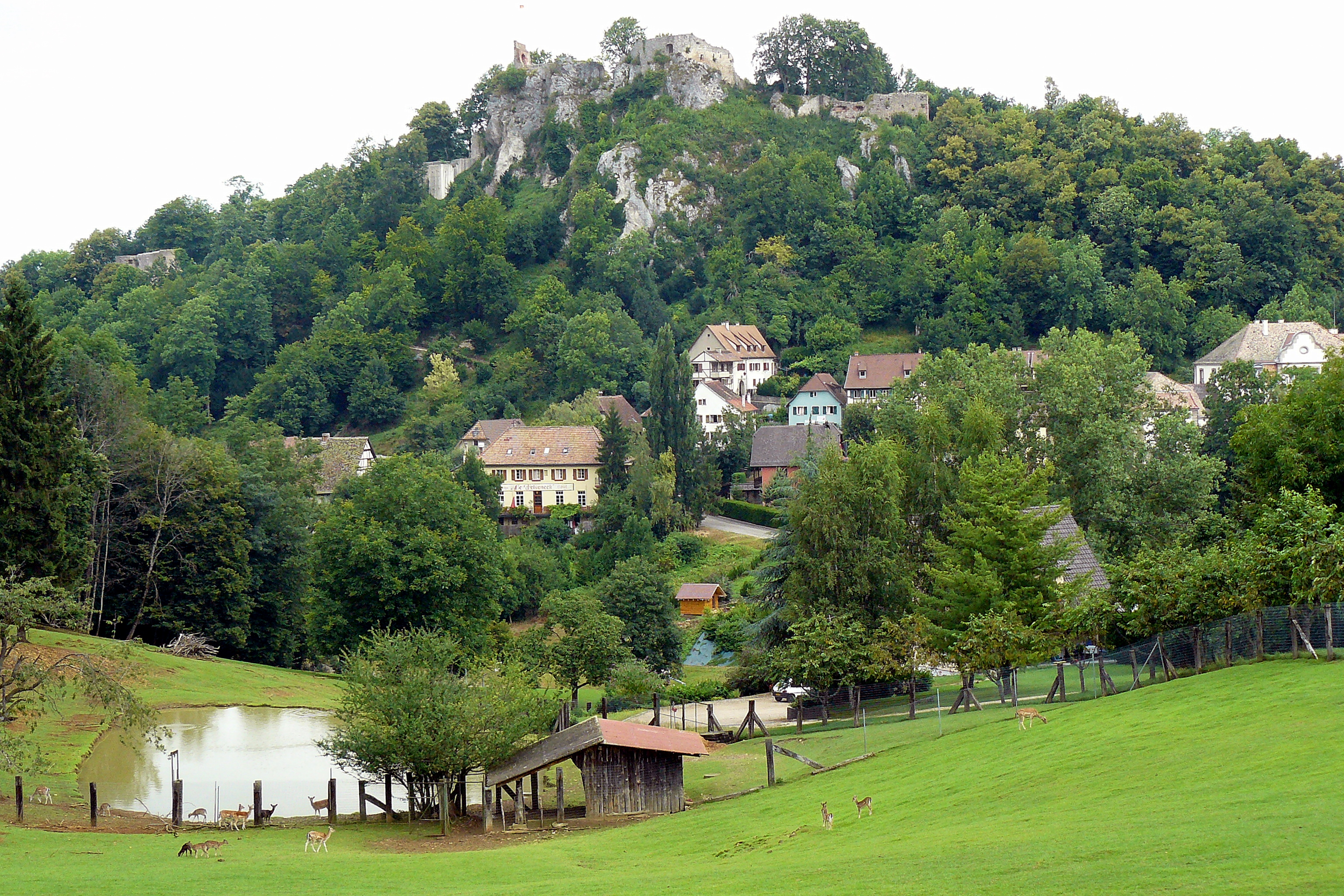
- A general view of Ferrette

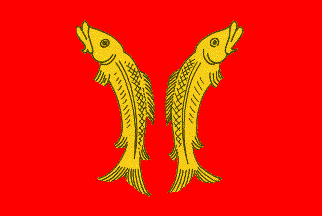
- Flag Coat of arms
- Location of Ferrette
- Location within France Location within Grand Est
- Coordinates: 47°30′N 7°19′E
- Country: France
- Region: Grand Est
- Department: Haut-Rhin
- Arrondissement: Altkirch
- Canton: Altkirch

Government
  - Mayor (2022–2026): François Cohendet
- Area^{1}: 1.94 km^{2} (0.75 sq mi)
- Elevation: 550 m (1,800 ft)
- Highest elevation: 640 m (2,100 ft)
- Lowest elevation: 429 m (1,407 ft)
- Population (2023): 864
  - Density: 445/km^{2} (1,150/sq mi)
- Time zone: UTC+01:00 (CET)
  - Summer (DST): UTC+02:00 (CEST)
- INSEE/Postal code: 68090 /68480
- ^{1} French Land Register data, which excludes lakes, ponds, glaciers > 1 km^{2} (0.386 sq mi or 247 acres) and river estuaries.

Ferrette (French pronunciation: [fɛʁɛt]; German: Pfirt [pfɪʁt]; Alsatian: Pfìrt) is a commune in the Haut-Rhin department in Alsace in north-eastern France.

It is situated close to the Swiss border. Its main attraction is the Château de Ferrette.

== County of Ferrette ==
The County of Ferrette came into existence in the 11th century and consisted of a large part of southern Alsace. In 1324, the County was acquired by Austria through the marriage of Jeanne, Countess of Ferrette, with Albert II, Duke of Austria. The County was part of the dowry for Catherine of Burgundy upon her marriage to Duke Leopold IV. Upon Leopold's death in 1411, his brother, Frederick occupied Ferrette. Austria ceded it to France in the Peace of Westphalia of 1648.

== Population ==
Historical population
Year	Pop.	±% p.a.
1968	798	—
1975	783	−0.27%
1982	727	−1.05%
1990	863	+2.17%
1999	1,020	+1.87%
2007	999	−0.26%
2012	779	−4.85%
2017	729	−1.32%
2023	864	+2.87%
Source: INSEE

== See also ==
- Communes of the Haut-Rhin département
