= Despina =

Despina may refer to:

== People ==
- Despina Achladiotou, the Lady of Ro (c1890–1982), Greek patriot
- Despina Chatzivassiliou-Tsovilis (born 1967), Secretary General of the Parliamentary Assembly of the Council of Europe (PACE)
- Despina Delios, American beauty pageant contestant
- Despina Georgiadou (born 1991), Greek fencer
- Mary Despina Lekas (1928–2023), American surgeon
- Despina Louca, Cypriot-American physicist
- Debbie Matenopolous, born Despina Matenopoulos (born 1974), American television host
- Despina Montagas (born 1961), Greek wrestler
- Despina Olympiou (born 1975), Greek-Cypriot singer
- Despina Papadopoulou (born 1979), Greek footballer
- Despina Papamichail (born 1993), Greek tennis player
- Despina Stokou (born 1978), Greek artist based in Los Angeles
- Despina Storch (1894 or 1895–1918), Greek woman suspected of spying for Germany in World War I
- Despina Stratigakos (born 1963), Canadian-born architectural historian and academic
- Despina Vandi (born 1969), Greek singer
- Despoina Vavatsi (born 1978), Greek athlete
- Olivera Despina (c. 1373 – after 1444), Serbian princess and Ottoman queen consort
- Milica Despina of Wallachia (c. 1485 – 1554), Princess consort of Wallachia

== Other uses ==
- Despoina, a figure in Greek mythology
- Despina (moth), a genus of moth
- Despina (moon), a moon of Neptune
- Despina, a character in Mozart's opera Così fan tutte
- "Despoina", a song by Nikos Karvelas
