= Vienna South (National Council electoral district) =

Parliamentary electoral district in Austria

- Wien Süd
- Electoral District for the National Council
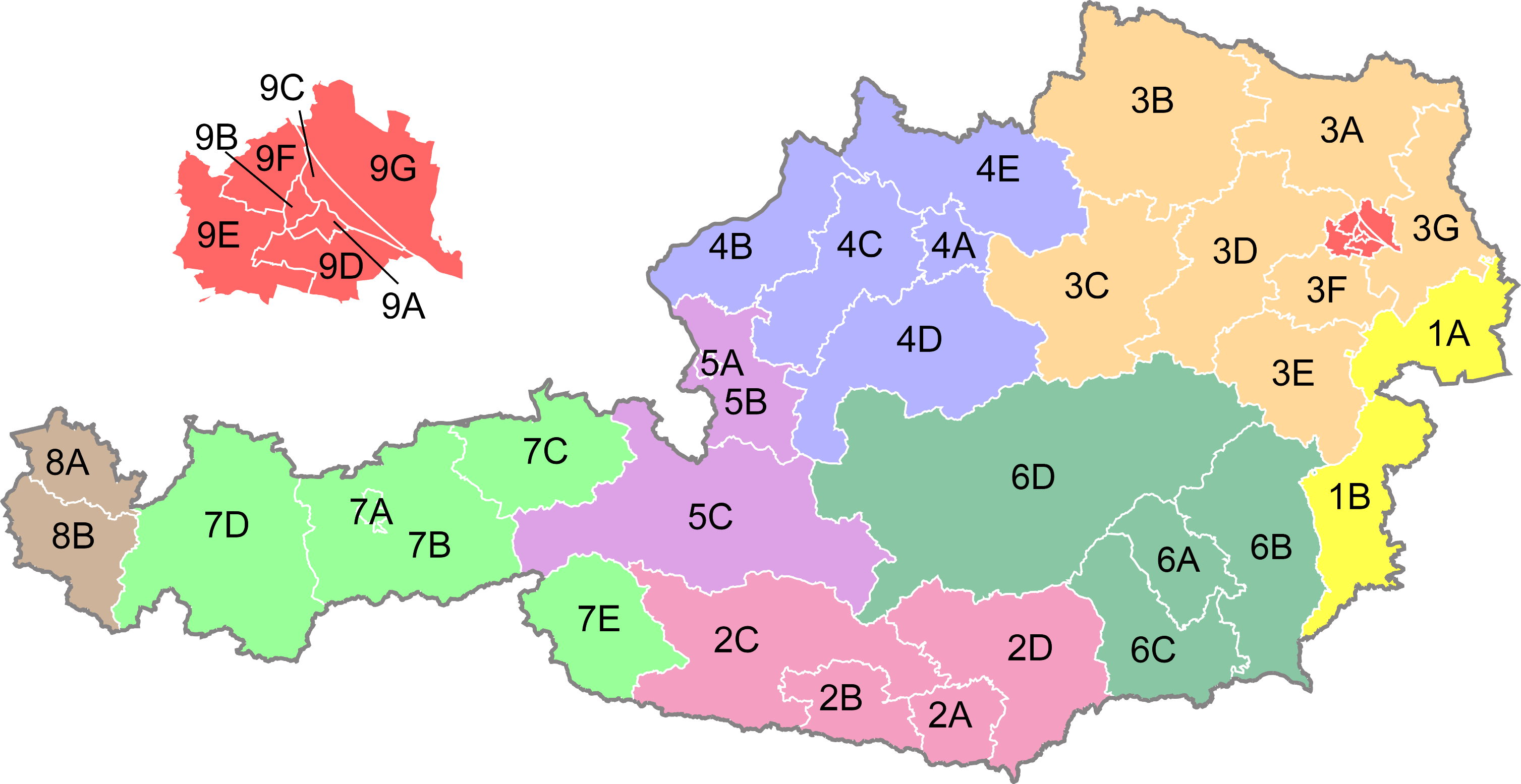
- The 39 regional electotral districts
- District: List: Favoriten; Meidling; Simmering
- State: Vienna
- Population: 432,597 (2024)
- Electorate: 225,324 (2019)
- Area: 63 km^{2} (2023)

Current Electoral District
- Created: 1994
- Seats: List: 6 (2024–present); 7 (1994–2024)
- Members: List: Petra Bayr (SPÖ); Nico Marchetti (ÖVP); Harald Stefan (FPÖ); Harald Troch (SPÖ)
- Created from: Vienna

Vienna South (German: Wien Süd), also known as Electoral District 9D (German: Wahlkreis 9D), is one of the 39 multi-member regional electoral districts of the National Council, the lower house of the Austrian Parliament, the national legislature of Austria. The electoral district was created in 1992 when electoral regulations were amended to add regional electoral districts to the existing state-wide electoral districts and came into being at the following legislative election in 1994. It consists of the districts of Favoriten, Meidling and Simmering in the city-state of Vienna. The electoral district currently elects six of the 183 members of the National Council using the open party-list proportional representation electoral system. At the 2019 legislative election the constituency had 225,324 registered electors.

== History ==
Vienna South was one 43 regional electoral districts (regionalwahlkreise) established by the "National Council Electoral Regulations 1992" (Nationalrats-Wahlordnung 1992) passed by the National Council in 1992. It consisted of the districts of Favoriten, Meidling and Simmering in the city-state of Vienna. The district was initially allocated seven seats in May 1993. Electoral regulations require the allocation of seats amongst the electoral districts to be recalculated following each national census and in June 2023 the number of seats allocated to Vienna South was reduced to six based on the population as at the 2021 national census.

== Electoral system ==
Vienna South currently elects six of the 183 members of the National Council using the open party-list proportional representation electoral system. The allocation of seats is carried out in three stages. In the first stage, seats are allocated to parties (lists) at the regional level using a state-wide Hare quota (wahlzahl) (valid votes in the state divided by the number of seats in the state). In the second stage, seats are allocated to parties at the state/provincial level using the state-wide Hare quota (any seats won by the party at the regional stage are subtracted from the party's state seats). In the third and final stage, seats are allocated to parties at the federal/national level using the D'Hondt method (any seats won by the party at the regional and state stages are subtracted from the party's federal seats). Only parties that reach the 4% national threshold, or have won a seat at the regional stage, compete for seats at the state and federal stages.

Electors may cast one preferential vote for individual candidates at the regional, state and federal levels. Split-ticket voting (panachage), or voting for more than one candidate at each level, is not permitted and will result in the ballot paper being invalidated. At the regional level, candidates must receive preferential votes amounting to at least 14% of the valid votes cast for their party to over-ride the order of the party list (10% and 7% respectively for the state and federal levels). Prior to April 2013 electors could not cast preferential votes at the federal level and the thresholds candidates needed to over-ride the party list order were higher at the regional level (half the Hare quota or 1/6 of the party votes) and state level (Hare quota).

== Election results ==
=== Summary ===
Election	Communists KPÖ+ / KPÖ			Social Democrats SPÖ			Greens GRÜNE			NEOS NEOS / LiF			People's ÖVP			Freedom FPÖ		
Election	Votes	%	Seats	Votes	%	Seats	Votes	%	Seats	Votes	%	Seats	Votes	%	Seats	Votes	%	Seats
2019	1,207	0.82%	0	51,006	34.55%	2	20,526	13.91%	0	9,750	6.61%	0	34,208	23.17%	1	25,235	17.10%	1
2017	1,816	1.13%	0	60,624	37.88%	2	5,561	3.47%	0	6,721	4.20%	0	28,153	17.59%	1	45,786	28.61%	1
2013	2,110	1.43%	0	56,961	38.49%	2	14,964	10.11%	0	6,694	4.52%	0	15,507	10.48%	0	40,865	27.61%	1
2008	1,497	0.92%	0	68,075	41.81%	2	16,485	10.13%	0	4,330	2.66%	0	17,625	10.83%	0	43,987	27.02%	1
2006	1,609	1.04%	0	75,656	48.96%	3	16,733	10.83%	0				24,362	15.77%	0	28,569	18.49%	1
2002	1,134	0.70%	0	85,866	52.88%	3	16,265	10.02%	0	1,833	1.13%	0	41,245	25.40%	1	14,659	9.03%	0
1999	1,432	0.92%	0	69,917	45.16%	2	11,157	7.21%	0	7,162	4.63%	0	18,348	11.85%	0	43,190	27.89%	1
1995	760	0.45%	0	86,395	51.12%	3	7,463	4.42%	0	11,908	7.05%	0	23,047	13.64%	0	36,957	21.87%	1
1994	723	0.46%	0	72,338	45.75%	3	11,628	7.35%	0	13,049	8.25%	0	19,266	12.18%	0	38,797	24.54%	1

=== Detailed ===
==== 2010s ====
===== 2019 =====
Results of the 2019 legislative election held on 29 September 2019:

Party		Votes per district				Total votes	%	Seats
Party		Favo- riten	Meid- ling	Simme- ring	Voting card	Total votes	%	Seats
Social Democratic Party of Austria	SPÖ	25,830	11,172	13,418	586	51,006	34.55%	2
Austrian People's Party	ÖVP	16,110	8,521	8,870	707	34,208	23.17%	1
Freedom Party of Austria	FPÖ	12,083	4,752	8,049	351	25,235	17.10%	1
The Greens – The Green Alternative	GRÜNE	8,729	7,007	4,313	477	20,526	13.91%	0
NEOS – The New Austria	NEOS	4,265	2,910	2,304	271	9,750	6.61%	0
JETZT	JETZT	1,721	1,068	962	85	3,836	2.60%	0
KPÖ Plus	KPÖ+	562	319	311	15	1,207	0.82%	0
The Beer Party	BIER	490	226	362	19	1,097	0.74%	0
Der Wandel	WANDL	344	197	187	21	749	0.51%	0
Valid Votes		70,134	36,172	38,776	2,532	147,614	100.00%	4
Rejected Votes		749	304	474	19	1,546	1.04%	
Total Polled		70,883	36,476	39,250	2,551	149,160	66.20%	
Registered Electors		109,553	55,143	60,628		225,324		
Turnout		64.70%	66.15%	64.74%		66.20%		

The following candidates were elected:

- Party mandates - Petra Bayr (SPÖ), 1,854 votes; Nico Marchetti (ÖVP), 1,408 votes; Harald Stefan (FPÖ), 1,307 votes; and Harald Troch (SPÖ), 1,579 votes.

===== 2017 =====
Results of the 2017 legislative election held on 15 October 2017:

Party		Votes per district				Total votes	%	Seats
Party		Favo- riten	Meid- ling	Simme- ring	Voting card	Total votes	%	Seats
Social Democratic Party of Austria	SPÖ	29,583	14,173	16,071	797	60,624	37.88%	2
Freedom Party of Austria	FPÖ	22,287	8,837	14,059	603	45,786	28.61%	1
Austrian People's Party	ÖVP	12,893	7,831	6,867	562	28,153	17.59%	1
Peter Pilz List	PILZ	4,014	2,737	2,121	221	9,093	5.68%	0
NEOS – The New Austria	NEOS	2,909	2,095	1,542	175	6,721	4.20%	0
The Greens – The Green Alternative	GRÜNE	2,390	1,970	1,064	137	5,561	3.47%	0
Communist Party of Austria	KPÖ	827	558	390	41	1,816	1.13%	0
My Vote Counts!	GILT	681	415	364	27	1,487	0.93%	0
Free List Austria	FLÖ	93	37	46	2	178	0.11%	0
EU Exit Party	EUAUS	88	36	48	3	175	0.11%	0
Homeless in Politics	ODP	93	42	29	3	167	0.10%	0
The Whites	WEIßE	71	44	46	4	165	0.10%	0
Socialist Left Party	SLP	63	29	29	4	125	0.08%	0
Valid Votes		75,992	38,804	42,676	2,579	160,051	100.00%	4
Rejected Votes		796	350	420	15	1,581	0.98%	
Total Polled		76,788	39,154	43,096	2,594	161,632	71.46%	
Registered Electors		109,854	55,528	60,805		226,187		
Turnout		69.90%	70.51%	70.88%		71.46%		

The following candidates were elected:

- Party mandates - Petra Bayr (SPÖ), 1,923 votes; Hubert Fuchs (Note: Heinz-Christian Strache was the FPÖ's first placed candidate in Vienna South but, as he was elected on the FPÖ's federal list, the second placed candidate Hubert Fuchs was elected in Vienna South.) (FPÖ), 144 votes; Nico Marchetti (ÖVP), 1,385 votes; and Harald Troch (SPÖ), 2,269 votes.

Hubert Fuchs (FPÖ) resigned on 19 December 2017 and was replaced by Ricarda Berger (FPÖ) on 20 December 2017. Ricarda Berger (FPÖ) was re-assigned to the Vienna seat vacated by Johann Gudenus and was replaced by Hubert Fuchs (FPÖ) in Vienna South on 24 May 2019.

===== 2013 =====
Results of the 2013 legislative election held on 29 September 2013:

Party		Votes per district				Total votes	%	Seats
Party		Favo- riten	Meid- ling	Simme- ring	Voting card	Total votes	%	Seats
Social Democratic Party of Austria	SPÖ	28,017	12,600	15,495	849	56,961	38.49%	2
Freedom Party of Austria	FPÖ	20,209	8,087	12,095	474	40,865	27.61%	1
Austrian People's Party	ÖVP	7,019	4,570	3,447	471	15,507	10.48%	0
The Greens – The Green Alternative	GRÜNE	6,342	5,189	3,061	372	14,964	10.11%	0
NEOS – The New Austria	NEOS	2,778	2,245	1,484	187	6,694	4.52%	0
Team Stronach	FRANK	2,924	1,465	1,529	117	6,035	4.08%	0
Alliance for the Future of Austria	BZÖ	1,500	796	855	73	3,224	2.18%	0
Communist Party of Austria	KPÖ	914	629	520	47	2,110	1.43%	0
Pirate Party of Austria	PIRAT	525	396	315	21	1,257	0.85%	0
Der Wandel	WANDL	93	66	47	3	209	0.14%	0
Socialist Left Party	SLP	75	63	36	2	176	0.12%	0
Valid Votes		70,396	36,106	38,884	2,616	148,002	100.00%	3
Rejected Votes		1,128	572	591	37	2,328	1.55%	
Total Polled		71,524	36,678	39,475	2,653	150,330	65.71%	
Registered Electors		111,853	56,609	60,329		228,791		
Turnout		63.94%	64.79%	65.43%		65.71%		

The following candidates were elected:

- Party mandates - Petra Bayr (SPÖ), 1,506 votes; Andreas Karlsböck (Note: Heinz-Christian Strache was the FPÖ's first placed candidate in Vienna South but, as he was elected on the FPÖ's federal list, the second placed candidate Andreas Karlsböck was elected in Vienna South.) (FPÖ), 78 votes; and Harald Troch (SPÖ), 2,126 votes.

==== 2000s ====
===== 2008 =====
Results of the 2008 legislative election held on 28 September 2008:

Party		Votes per district				Total votes	%	Seats
Party		Favo- riten	Meid- ling	Simme- ring	Voting card	Total votes	%	Seats
Social Democratic Party of Austria	SPÖ	32,800	14,631	17,448	3,196	68,075	41.81%	2
Freedom Party of Austria	FPÖ	21,711	8,731	11,975	1,570	43,987	27.02%	1
Austrian People's Party	ÖVP	7,476	5,241	3,525	1,383	17,625	10.83%	0
The Greens – The Green Alternative	GRÜNE	7,003	5,367	3,342	773	16,485	10.13%	0
Alliance for the Future of Austria	BZÖ	3,498	1,677	2,067	382	7,624	4.68%	0
Liberal Forum	LiF	1,773	1,331	985	241	4,330	2.66%	0
Communist Party of Austria	KPÖ	680	388	363	66	1,497	0.92%	0
Fritz Dinkhauser List – Citizens' Forum Tyrol	FRITZ	572	315	272	82	1,241	0.76%	0
Independent Citizens' Initiative Save Austria	RETTÖ	394	250	246	30	920	0.57%	0
The Christians	DC	189	126	113	13	441	0.27%	0
Animal Rights Party	TRP	171	93	112	21	397	0.24%	0
Left	LINKE	91	61	30	6	188	0.12%	0
Valid Votes		76,358	38,211	40,478	7,763	162,810	100.00%	3
Rejected Votes		1,065	570	557	120	2,312	1.40%	
Total Polled		77,423	38,781	41,035	7,883	165,122	71.39%	
Registered Electors		114,291	57,601	59,389		231,281		
Turnout		67.74%	67.33%	69.10%		71.39%		

The following candidates were elected:

- Party mandates - Petra Bayr (SPÖ), 1,857 votes; Peter Fichtenbauer (Note: Heinz-Christian Strache was the FPÖ's first placed candidate in Vienna South but, as he was elected on the FPÖ's federal list, the second placed candidate Peter Fichtenbauer was elected in Vienna South.) (FPÖ), 172 votes; and Christine Lapp (SPÖ), 1,802 votes.

Peter Fichtenbauer (FPÖ) resigned on 30 June 2013 and was replaced by Andreas Karlsböck (FPÖ).

===== 2006 =====
Results of the 2006 legislative election held on 1 October 2006:

Party		Votes per district				Total votes	%	Seats
Party		Favo- riten	Meid- ling	Simme- ring	Voting card	Total votes	%	Seats
Social Democratic Party of Austria	SPÖ	35,106	15,765	18,675	6,110	75,656	48.96%	3
Freedom Party of Austria	FPÖ	14,091	5,649	7,131	1,698	28,569	18.49%	1
Austrian People's Party	ÖVP	10,116	6,390	4,667	3,189	24,362	15.77%	0
The Greens – The Green Alternative	GRÜNE	6,752	5,166	3,183	1,632	16,733	10.83%	0
Hans-Peter Martin's List	MATIN	1,508	779	919	275	3,481	2.25%	0
Alliance for the Future of Austria	BZÖ	1,391	648	677	240	2,956	1.91%	0
Communist Party of Austria	KPÖ	725	431	360	93	1,609	1.04%	0
EU Withdrawal – Neutral Free Austria	NFÖ	303	151	166	40	660	0.43%	0
Socialist Left Party	SLP	242	124	120	17	503	0.33%	0
Valid Votes		70,234	35,103	35,898	13,294	154,529	100.00%	4
Rejected Votes		849	470	458	125	1,902	1.22%	
Total Polled		71,083	35,573	36,356	13,419	156,431	70.17%	
Registered Electors		111,098	55,735	56,102		222,935		
Turnout		63.98%	63.83%	64.80%		70.17%		

The following candidates were elected:

- Party mandates - Petra Bayr (SPÖ), 975 votes; Peter Fichtenbauer (Note: Heinz-Christian Strache was the FPÖ's first placed candidate in Vienna South but, as he was elected on the FPÖ's federal list, the third placed candidate Peter Fichtenbauer was elected in Vienna South.) (FPÖ), 53 votes; Anton Gaál (SPÖ), 3,388 votes; and Christine Lapp (SPÖ), 2,743 votes.

Anton Gaál (SPÖ) resigned on 26 September 2007 and was replaced by Christian Hursky (SPÖ) on 27 September 2007.

===== 2002 =====
Results of the 2002 legislative election held on 24 November 2002:

Party		Votes per district				Total votes	%	Seats
Party		Favo- riten	Meid- ling	Simme- ring	Voting card	Total votes	%	Seats
Social Democratic Party of Austria	SPÖ	40,546	18,193	22,180	4,947	85,866	52.88%	3
Austrian People's Party	ÖVP	18,252	10,423	9,253	3,317	41,245	25.40%	1
The Greens – The Green Alternative	GRÜNE	6,765	5,008	3,309	1,183	16,265	10.02%	0
Freedom Party of Austria	FPÖ	7,205	3,389	3,385	680	14,659	9.03%	0
Liberal Forum	LiF	849	447	443	94	1,833	1.13%	0
Communist Party of Austria	KPÖ	527	285	286	36	1,134	0.70%	0
Socialist Left Party	SLP	480	215	207	18	920	0.57%	0
The Democrats		220	99	114	21	454	0.28%	0
Valid Votes		74,844	38,059	39,177	10,296	162,376	100.00%	4
Rejected Votes		779	430	481	94	1,784	1.09%	
Total Polled		75,623	38,489	39,658	10,390	164,160	75.90%	
Registered Electors		106,285	54,647	55,361		216,293		
Turnout		71.15%	70.43%	71.64%		75.90%		

The following candidates were elected:

- Party mandates - Petra Bayr (SPÖ), 1,069 votes; Anton Gaál (SPÖ), 5,038 votes; Christine Lapp (SPÖ), 3,086 votes; and Christine Marek (ÖVP), 1,100 votes.

Christine Marek (ÖVP) was re-assigned to the Vienna seat vacated by Ulrike Baumgartner-Gabitzer and was replaced by Gabriele Tamandl (ÖVP) on 5 March 2003.

==== 1990s ====
===== 1999 =====
Results of the 1999 legislative election held on 3 October 1999:

Party		Votes per district				Total votes	%	Seats
Party		Favo- riten	Meid- ling	Simme- ring	Voting card	Total votes	%	Seats
Social Democratic Party of Austria	SPÖ	32,115	14,669	17,012	6,121	69,917	45.16%	2
Freedom Party of Austria	FPÖ	20,147	9,505	10,379	3,159	43,190	27.89%	1
Austrian People's Party	ÖVP	7,366	4,990	3,513	2,479	18,348	11.85%	0
The Greens – The Green Alternative	GRÜNE	4,713	3,322	2,019	1,103	11,157	7.21%	0
Liberal Forum	LiF	3,049	2,084	1,347	682	7,162	4.63%	0
The Independents	DU	1,346	645	631	189	2,811	1.82%	0
Communist Party of Austria	KPÖ	660	351	339	82	1,432	0.92%	0
No to NATO and EU – Neutral Austria Citizens' Initiative	NEIN	386	212	160	56	814	0.53%	0
Valid Votes		69,782	35,778	35,400	13,871	154,831	100.00%	3
Rejected Votes		1,044	482	589	110	2,225	1.42%	
Total Polled		70,826	36,260	35,989	13,981	157,056	72.90%	
Registered Electors		107,120	55,287	53,028		215,435		
Turnout		66.12%	65.59%	67.87%		72.90%		

The following candidates were elected:

- Personal mandates - Peter Westenthaler (FPÖ), 9,148 votes.
- Party mandates - Otmar Brix (SPÖ), 2,009 votes; and Anton Gaál (SPÖ), 2,681 votes.

Otmar Brix (SPÖ) resigned on 8 May 2001 and was replaced by Christine Lapp (SPÖ) on 10 May 2001.

===== 1995 =====
Results of the 1995 legislative election held on 17 December 1995:

Party		Votes per district				Total votes	%	Seats
Party		Favo- riten	Meid- ling	Simme- ring	Voting card	Total votes	%	Seats
Social Democratic Party of Austria	SPÖ	42,149	19,314	20,619	4,313	86,395	51.12%	3
Freedom Party of Austria	FPÖ	17,949	9,035	8,205	1,768	36,957	21.87%	1
Austrian People's Party	ÖVP	9,943	6,901	4,459	1,744	23,047	13.64%	0
Liberal Forum	LiF	5,628	3,323	2,340	617	11,908	7.05%	0
The Greens – The Green Alternative	GRÜNE	3,411	2,303	1,310	439	7,463	4.42%	0
No – Civic Action Group; Against the Sale of Austria	NEIN	1,027	537	466	84	2,114	1.25%	0
Communist Party of Austria	KPÖ	400	171	162	27	760	0.45%	0
Natural Law Party	ÖNP	162	113	74	25	374	0.22%	0
Valid Votes		80,669	41,697	37,635	9,017	169,018	100.00%	4
Rejected Votes		1,415	644	750	98	2,907	1.69%	
Total Polled		82,084	42,341	38,385	9,115	171,925	79.28%	
Registered Electors		109,559	57,350	49,956		216,865		
Turnout		74.92%	73.83%	76.84%		79.28%		

The following candidates were elected:

- Party mandates - Holger Bauer (FPÖ), 2,806 votes; Otmar Brix (SPÖ), 2,052 votes; Brunhilde Fuchs (SPÖ), 1,298 votes; and Anton Gaál (SPÖ), 2,552 votes.

===== 1994 =====
Results of the 1994 legislative election held on 9 October 1994:

Party		Votes per district				Total votes	%	Seats
Party		Favo- riten	Meid- ling	Simme- ring	Voting card	Total votes	%	Seats
Social Democratic Party of Austria	SPÖ	33,973	15,678	16,892	5,795	72,338	45.75%	3
Freedom Party of Austria	FPÖ	18,292	9,181	8,454	2,870	38,797	24.54%	1
Austrian People's Party	ÖVP	7,742	5,620	3,633	2,271	19,266	12.18%	0
Liberal Forum	LiF	5,877	3,487	2,550	1,135	13,049	8.25%	0
The Greens – The Green Alternative	GRÜNE	5,130	3,318	2,174	1,006	11,628	7.35%	0
No – Civic Action Group; Against the Sale of Austria	NEIN	858	448	333	140	1,779	1.13%	0
Communist Party of Austria	KPÖ	372	167	140	44	723	0.46%	0
Natural Law Party	ÖNP	118	79	63	20	280	0.18%	0
United Greens Austria – List Adi Pinter	VGÖ	74	29	24	8	135	0.09%	0
Citizen Greens Austria – Free Democrats	BGÖ	52	35	22	12	121	0.08%	0
Valid Votes		72,488	38,042	34,285	13,301	158,116	100.00%	4
Rejected Votes		919	505	524	126	2,074	1.29%	
Total Polled		73,407	38,547	34,809	13,427	160,190	72.86%	
Registered Electors		110,576	58,580	50,696		219,852		
Turnout		66.39%	65.80%	68.66%		72.86%		

The following candidates were elected:

- Party mandates - Holger Bauer (FPÖ), 3,490 votes; Otmar Brix (SPÖ), 2,114 votes; Brunhilde Fuchs (SPÖ), 1,142 votes; and Anton Gaál (SPÖ), 3,396 votes.
