= Alliance of Liberals and Democrats for Europe in the Parliamentary Assembly of the Council of Europe =

ALDE-PACE
- President: Iulian Bulai
- Ideology: Liberalism

Website
- http://www.alde-pace.org/

The Alliance of Liberals and Democrats for Europe in the Parliamentary Assembly of the Council of Europe (ALDE-PACE) (French: Alliance des démocrates et des libéraux pour l'Europe à l'Assemblée parlementaire du Conseil de l'Europe) is a political group in the Parliamentary Assembly of the Council of Europe bringing together 94 members from 33 states. Since June 2022, the group is chaired by Iulian Bulai of Romania.

== ALDE-PACE Mission ==
The Mission of the ALDE-PACE group is to promote core values of the Council of Europe: democracy, human rights and the rule of law through enhanced political actions inside and outside the Parliamentary Assembly of the Council of Europe. ALDE adopted a new mission statement 22 January 2018 outlining the values and objectives of the group. ALDE members realize these objectives by actively participating in the Parliamentary Assembly sessions, working in its Committees, drafting reports, initiating debates and ensuring the follow-up of this work in their home countries. Outside the Assembly the group members are committed to promoting the principles of the Council of Europe and giving support to liberal and democratic values throughout Europe.

== Composition ==
=== Bureau ===
According to the Rules of Procedure of the ALDE-PACE (as amended on 22 January 2018), the Bureau of the Group consists of the Chairperson, 11 Vice-Chairpersons and the Treasurer of the Group. Chairpersons of committees and former Chairpersons of the Group are ex officio members of the Bureau.

=== Members ===
List of ALDE-PACE members

=== Secretariat ===
The permanent secretariat of the Group is located in the headquarters of the Council of Europe in Strasbourg, France (Palais de l’Europe). The secretariat is chaired by Dr Maria Bigday.

== History ==
It was not until after the celebration of the Council of Europe's 25th anniversary in 1964 that the Rules of Procedure of the Consultative Assembly (its name was not changed to Parliamentary Assembly until 1974) discreetly mentioned that members had the possibility of forming political groups. The history of the liberal group in the PACE dates back to the early 1970s (first documented in 1974). At the time it was called the Liberal Group and consisted of 30 members headed by Frederik Portheine (Netherlands).

In the mid-80s the group changed its name to the "Liberal, Democratic and Reformers' Group" (LDR) in order to make the Group's political ideals universally and unequivocally recognisable. The name "Alliance of Liberals and Democrats for Europe" (ALDE) was adopted on 20 June 2005 in order to enhance cooperation with other European liberal and democratic bodies, in particular the ALDE of the European Parliament.

=== ALDE-PACE Presidents ===
| In office | President | Country |
|---|---|---|
| June 2022 – present | Iulian Bulai | Romania |
| January 2020 – June 2022 | Jacques Maire | France |
| 2017–2020 | Rik Daems | Belgium |
| 2014 – October 2017 | Jordi Xuclà | Spain |
| 2009–2014 | Anne Brasseur | Luxembourg |
| 2002–2009 | Mátyás Eörsi | Hungary |
| 1999–2002 | Kristiina Ojuland | Estonia |
| 1994–1999 | Sir Russell-Johnston | United Kingdom |
| 1991–1994 | Daniel Tarschys | Sweden |
| 1983–1991 | Bjorn Elmquist | Denmark |
| 1980–1983 | Manfred Vohrer | West Germany |
| 1974–1980 | Frederik Portheine | Netherlands |

=== Liberal Presidents of the Parliamentary Assembly ===
| In office | President | Country |
|---|---|---|
| 2020–2022 | Rik Daems | Belgium |
| 2014–2016 | Anne Brasseur | Luxembourg |
| 1999–2002 | Lord Russell-Johnston | United Kingdom |
| 1978–1981 | Hans J. de Koster | Netherlands |
| 1969–1972 | Olivier Reverdin | Switzerland |
| 1960–1963 | Per Federspiel | Denmark |

=== Liberal Secretary General of the Council of Europe ===
Daniel Tarschys (Sweden) was Secretary General of the Council of Europe from 1994 - 1999.

=== History of the Secretariat ===
The permanent secretariat of the Group operates since 1978, when Mr Peter Kallenberger was appointed Secretary of the Group. After he retired in 2010, Ms Maria Bigday took up the position of the Secretary.

== Activities ==
=== Recent reports prepared by the ALDE members ===
- Claude Kern
  - Challenges to democracy in Georgia (Report, Doc 16018, 27 June 2024)
- Yevheniia Kravchuk
  - Countering the erasure of cultural identity in war and peace" (Report, Doc 16003, 26 June 2024)
- Eerik-Niiles Kross
  - Sanctions against persons on the "Kara-Murza list" (Report, Doc 15939, 17 April 2024)
- Iulian Bulai
  - Ensuring a just peace in Ukraine and lasting security in Europe (Report, Doc 15842, 12 October 2023)
- Fiona O'Loughlin
  - The Reykjavik Summit of the Council of Europe: United around values in the face of extraordinary challenges (Report, Doc 15681, 24 January 2023)
- Damien Cottier
  - Legal and human rights aspects of the Russian Federation’s aggression against Ukraine (Report, Doc. 15689, 26 January 2023)
- Valentina Grippo
  - General Rapporteur on media freedom and safety of journalists (since January 2024)

=== Conferences and side-events ===
The ALDE-PACE Group regularly holds conferences, hearings, seminars and round tables in the framework of the Council of Europe scope of interest. It also co-organises joint events with other European and international liberal and democratic institutions. Information relating to these side events is found on the ALDE-PACE Pace website and in the ALDE newsletter published after each session.

== Partner organisations ==
The ALDE-PACE holds stable partnership with major European and world liberal and democratic organisations.

1. ALDE Party
2. Renew Europe in the European Parliament
3. International Federation of Liberal Youth (IFLRY)
4. Liberal International (LI)
5. Renew Europe in the European Committee of the Regions
6. Independent Liberal and Democratic Group in the Congress of Local and Regional Authorities of the Council of Europe
