= List of presidents of the Parliamentary Assembly of the Council of Europe =

The president of the Parliamentary Assembly of the Council of Europe is the head of the Parliamentary Assembly of the Council of Europe (PACE): the deliberative consultative body of the Council of Europe.

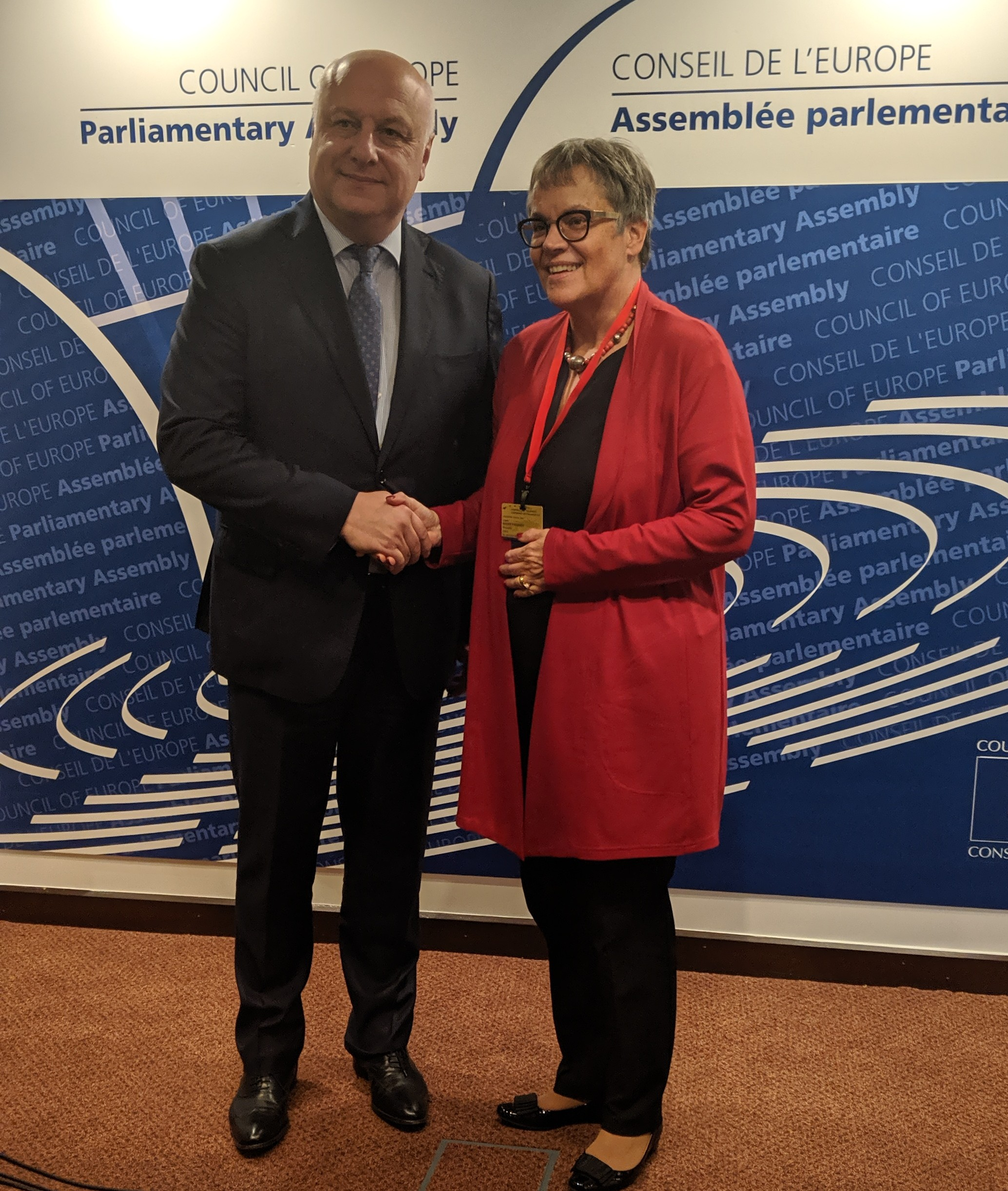
Former president Liliane Maury Pasquier (right) with OSCE PA President Gigi Tsereteli, 2019

Period	Name	Country	Political affiliation
1949	Édouard Herriot (interim)	France	Radical Party
1949–1951	Paul-Henri Spaak	Belgium	Socialist Party
1952–1954	François de Menthon	France	Popular Republican Movement
1954–1956	Guy Mollet	France	Socialist Party
1956–1959	Fernand Dehousse	Belgium	Socialist Party
1959	John Edwards	United Kingdom	Labour Party
1960–1963	Per Federspiel	Denmark	Venstre
1963–1966	Pierre Pflimlin	France	Popular Republican Movement
1966–1969	Sir Geoffrey de Freitas	United Kingdom	Labour Party
1969–1972	Olivier Reverdin	Switzerland	Liberal Party
1972–1975	Giuseppe Vedovato	Italy	Christian Democracy
1975–1978	Karl Czernetz	Austria	Social Democratic Party
1978–1981	Hans J. de Koster	Netherlands	People's Party for Freedom and Democracy
1981–1982	José María de Areilza	Spain	Union of the Democratic Centre
1983–1986	Karl Ahrens	Germany	Social Democratic Party
1986–1989	Louis Jung	France	Group of the European People's Party
1989–1992	Andreas Björck	Sweden	European Democratic Group
1992	Geoffrey Finsberg	United Kingdom	European Democratic Group
1992–1995	Miguel Angel Martínez Martínez	Spain	Socialist Group
1996–1999	Leni Fischer	Germany	Group of the European People's Party
1999–2002	Lord Russell Johnston	United Kingdom	Alliance of Liberals and Democrats for Europe
2002–2004	Peter Schieder	Austria	Socialist Group
2005–2008	René van der Linden	Netherlands	Group of the European People's Party
2008–2010	Lluís Maria De Puig	Spain	Socialist Group
2010–2012	Mevlüt Çavuşoğlu	Turkey	Justice and Development Party
2012–2014	Jean-Claude Mignon	France	Group of the European People's Party
2014–2016	Anne Brasseur	Luxembourg	Alliance of Liberals and Democrats for Europe
2016–2017	Pedro Agramunt	Spain	Group of the European People's Party
2017–2018	Stella Kyriakides	Cyprus	Group of the European People's Party
2018	Michele Nicoletti	Italy	Socialists, Democrats and Greens Group
2018–2020	Liliane Maury Pasquier	Switzerland	Socialists, Democrats and Greens Group
2020–2022	Rik Daems	Belgium	Alliance of Liberals and Democrats for Europe
2022–2024	Tiny Kox	Netherlands	Unified European Left Group
2024–2026	Theodoros Roussopoulos	Greece	Group of the European People's Party
2026–present	Petra Bayr	Austria	Social Democratic Party
