= Troch =

Troch is a surname. Notable people with the surname include:

- Denis Troch (born 1959), French football player and manager
- Fien Troch (born 1978), Belgian film director, producer and screenwriter
- Harald Troch (born 1959), Austrian politician
- Ludo Troch, film editor
