= Ricarda Berger =

Austrian politician (born 1986)

Member of the National Council
- In office 20 December 2017 – 22 October 2019
- Preceded by: Hubert Fuchs
- Constituency: Vienna South (2017–2019); Vienna (2019)

Personal details
- Born: 22 May 1986 (age 39)
- Party: Freedom Party

Ricarda Bianca Berger (born 22 May 1986) is an Austrian politician of the Freedom Party. From 2017 to 2019, she was a member of the National Council. From 2015 to 2017, she was a member of the Municipal Council and Landtag of Vienna.
