= Petra Bayr =

Austrian politician (born 1968)

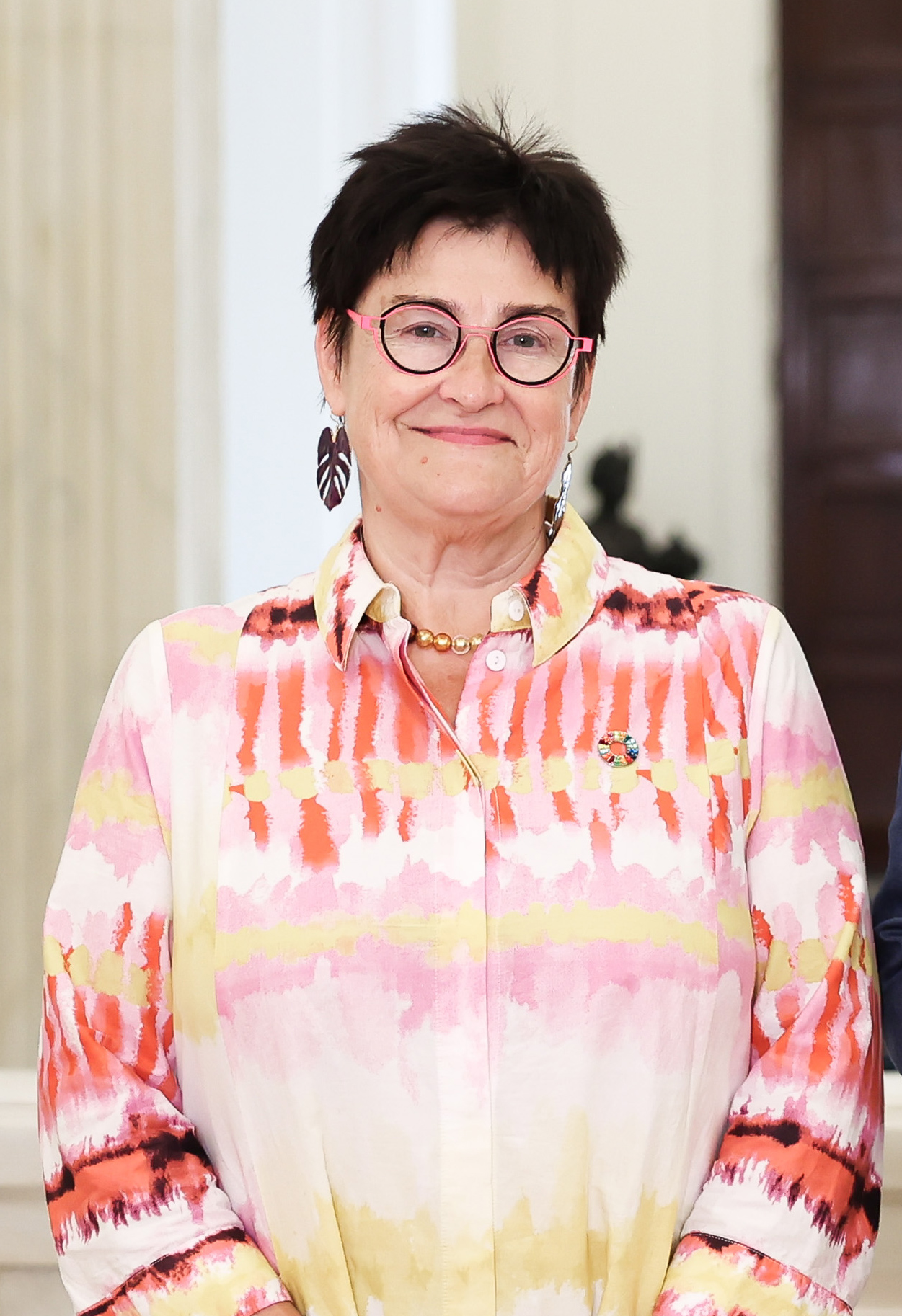
- Bayr in May 2026

President of the Parliamentary Assembly of the Council of Europe
- Incumbent
- Assumed office 26 January 2026
- Preceded by: Theodoros Roussopoulos

Member of the National Council
- Incumbent
- Assumed office 20 December 2002
- Constituency: Vienna South

Member of the Municipal Council and Landtag of Vienna
- In office 29 November 1996 – 19 December 2002

Personal details
- Born: 28 April 1968 (age 58) Vienna, Austria
- Party: Social Democratic Party
- Education: University of Vienna; University of Graz; Danube University Krems
- Website: petrabayr.at

Petra Bayr (born 28 April 1968), also known as Penny Bayr, is an Austrian politician of the Social Democratic Party (SPÖ) who has been serving as a member of the National Council since 2022, representing the Vienna South district.

Earlier in her career, Bayr was a member of the Municipal Council and Landtag of Vienna from November 1996 to December 2002.

== Early life ==
Bayr was born on 28 April 1968 in Vienna. She was editor of her school newspaper. She studied sociology and education at the University of Vienna and University of Graz. She has a Master of Arts degree in human rights and a Master of Legal Studies degree from the Danube University Krems.

== Early career ==
Bayr worked as a freelancer at ORF, Ö3, Radio Wien and various youth magazines from 1984 to 1985. She was a trainer in youth work (1986–1996), a Parliamentary employee (1994–1996) and a clerk at the Österreichische Industrieverwaltungs (ÖIAG) (1994–1997). She worked for EGA - Frauenzentrum from 1997 to 2001. She worked for the Social Democratic Party (SPÖ)'s Vienna branch from 2001 to 2022 - in public relations (2001–2009) and for the networking, anti-racism and international affairs department (2009–2022).

Bayr was active in the Union of Private Sector Employees (GPA)'s youth department from 1984 to 1997 and women's department from 1985 to 2002.

== Political career ==
=== Career in local politics ===
Bayr has been active with the SPÖ in Favoriten since 1986. She has held various positions in the Viennese branch of the SPÖ and its youth wing Junge Generation. Bayr was chair of the women's committee of the Austrian Federal Youth Council (BJV) from 1990 to 1992.

Bayr was a member of the district council (Bezirksvertretung) in Favoriten from 1994 to 1996. She was a member of the Municipal Council and Landtag of Vienna from November 1996 to December 2002.

=== Member of the National Council, 2002–present ===
Bayr was elected to the National Council at the 2002 legislative election. In parliament,

In addition to her committee assignments, Bayr was also a member of the Austrian delegation to the Inter-Parliamentary Union from 2012 to 2021.

=== Member of the Parliamentary Assembly of the Council of Europe, 2018–present ===
Since 2018, Bayr has been part of the Austrian delegation to the Parliamentary Assembly of the Council of Europe. Within the Assembly, she has chaired the Committee on the Election of Judges to the European Court of Human Rights since 2024. She led the Assembly's observer mission to the February 2025 Kosovan parliamentary election.

Since 2026, Bayr has been serving as the Assembly's president, making her the third Austrian national holding that office since 1949, after Peter Schieder (2002-2005) and Karl Czernetz (1975-1978).

== Other activities ==
- International Planned Parenthood Federation (IPPF), Member of the Strategy, Investment and Policy Committee (since 2020)

== Recognition ==
Bayr received the Grand Decoration of Honour in Gold (Grosses Goldenes Ehrenzeichen) honour in 2007.

== Electoral history ==
Electoral history of Petra Bayr
Election	Electoral district	Party	Votes	%	Result
2002 legislative	Vienna South	Social Democratic Party	1,069	1.24%	Elected
2006 legislative	Vienna South	Social Democratic Party	975	1.29%	Elected
2006 legislative	Vienna	Social Democratic Party	86	0.03%	Not elected
2006 legislative	Federal List	Social Democratic Party	-	-	Not elected
2008 legislative	Vienna South	Social Democratic Party	1,857	2.73%	Elected
2008 legislative	Federal List	Social Democratic Party	-	-	Not elected
2013 legislative	Vienna South	Social Democratic Party	1,506	2.64%	Elected
2013 legislative	Vienna	Social Democratic Party	107	0.04%	Not elected
2013 legislative	Federal List	Social Democratic Party	76	0.01%	Not elected
2017 legislative	Vienna South	Social Democratic Party	1,923	3.17%	Elected
2017 legislative	Vienna	Social Democratic Party	150	0.05%	Not elected
2017 legislative	Federal List	Social Democratic Party	88	0.01%	Not elected
2019 legislative	Vienna South	Social Democratic Party	1,854	3.63%	Elected
2019 legislative	Vienna	Social Democratic Party	101	0.05%	Not elected
2019 legislative	Federal List	Social Democratic Party	73	0.01%	Not elected
2024 legislative	Vienna South	Social Democratic Party	2,099	4.59%	Elected
2024 legislative	Vienna	Social Democratic Party	175	0.07%	Not elected
2024 legislative	Federal List	Social Democratic Party	133	0.01%	Not elected
