= Michele Nicoletti =

Italian politician and philosopher

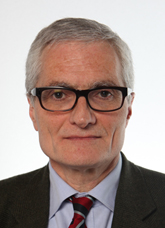

President of the Parliamentary Assembly of the Council of Europe
- In office 22 January 2018 – 24 June 2018
- Preceded by: Stella Kyriakides
- Succeeded by: Liliane Maury Pasquier

Member of the Chamber of Deputies
- In office 15 March 2013 – 22 March 2018
- Constituency: Trentino-Alto Adige/Südtirol

Personal details
- Born: 19 November 1956 (age 69) Trento, Trentino, Italy
- Party: Democratic Party
- Spouse: Maria Videsott
- Children: 3
- Education: University of Bologna
- Occupation: University professor of political philosophy

Michele Nicoletti (born 19 November 1956, Trento) is an Italian politician and philosopher, and served as the President of the Parliamentary Assembly of the Council of Europe in 2018.

He was elected to the Italian Chamber of Deputies in the elections of 24–25 February 2013. He was a member of the Commission of the Twelve, an advisory body for the implementation of the Statute of Trentino-Alto Adige/Südtirol, and was also the provincial Secretary of the Democratic Party of Trentino until 16 March 2014. On 22 January 2018, he was elected as the 31st President of the Parliamentary Assembly of the Council of Europe, a body bringing together parliamentarians from 47 European nations to promote human rights and democracy. He is only the second Italian to hold the post. He earlier served as the leader of the Assembly's second-largest political group, the Socialist Group, and the head of the Italian parliamentary delegation to the Assembly. He is also a full professor of political philosophy at the University of Trento, in Trentino, Italy.

== Life and career ==
Nicoletti graduated with a degree in philosophy at Bologna and since 2001 has been a professor of political philosophy at the Faculty of Letters and Philosophy (Department of Philosophy, History and Cultural Heritage) and the School of International Studies of the University of Trento. Since 2011, he has been the director of the Antonio Rosmini Study and Research Center in Rovereto. In 2007, he was a Fulbright Distinguished Lecturer at the University of Notre Dame.

On 6 August 2014, Nicoletti became President of the Italian delegation to the Parliamentary Assembly of the Council of Europe. In this capacity, he serves on the Sub-Committee on Conflicts between Council of Europe Member States, the Sub-Committee on External Relations, and the Sub-Committee on Ethics. Between 2016 and 2017, he was the Assembly’s rapporteur on corruption.

He currently lives and works in Trento and Rome. He is married, with three children.

== Awards and honours ==
- 2001 – Special Mention of the Jury, VIII International Award "Salvatore Valitutti" for the book La politica e il male.

== Books and Bibliography ==
- M. Nicoletti, La dialettica dell'Incarnazione: soggettività e storia in S. Kierkegaard, Bologna: EDB, 1983.
- M. Nicoletti (Ed. critica a cura di), L'empatia, di E. Stein, Milano: Franco Angeli, 1986.
- M. Nicoletti, Trascendenza e potere: la teologia politica di Carl Schmitt, Brescia: Morcelliana, 1990.
- M. Nicoletti, La politica e il male, Brescia: Morcelliana, 2000.
- M. Nicoletti, S. Zucal, F. Olivetti (a cura di), Da che parte dobbiamo stare: il personalismo di Paul Ludwig Landsberg, Soveria Mannelli: Rubbettino, 2007.
- M. Nicoletti (Ed. a cura di), Angeli delle nazioni - Origine e sviluppi di una figura teologico-politica, Brescia: Morcelliana, 2007.
- M. Nicoletti, Religion and Empire: Carl Schmitt's Kathechon between International Relations and the Philosophy of History, International Law and Religion ed. by M. Koskenniemi, M. García-Salmones Rovira and P. Amorosa, Oxford University Press, 2017.
