= Theodoros Roussopoulos =

Greek politician (born 1963)

- Θεόδωρος Ρουσόπουλος
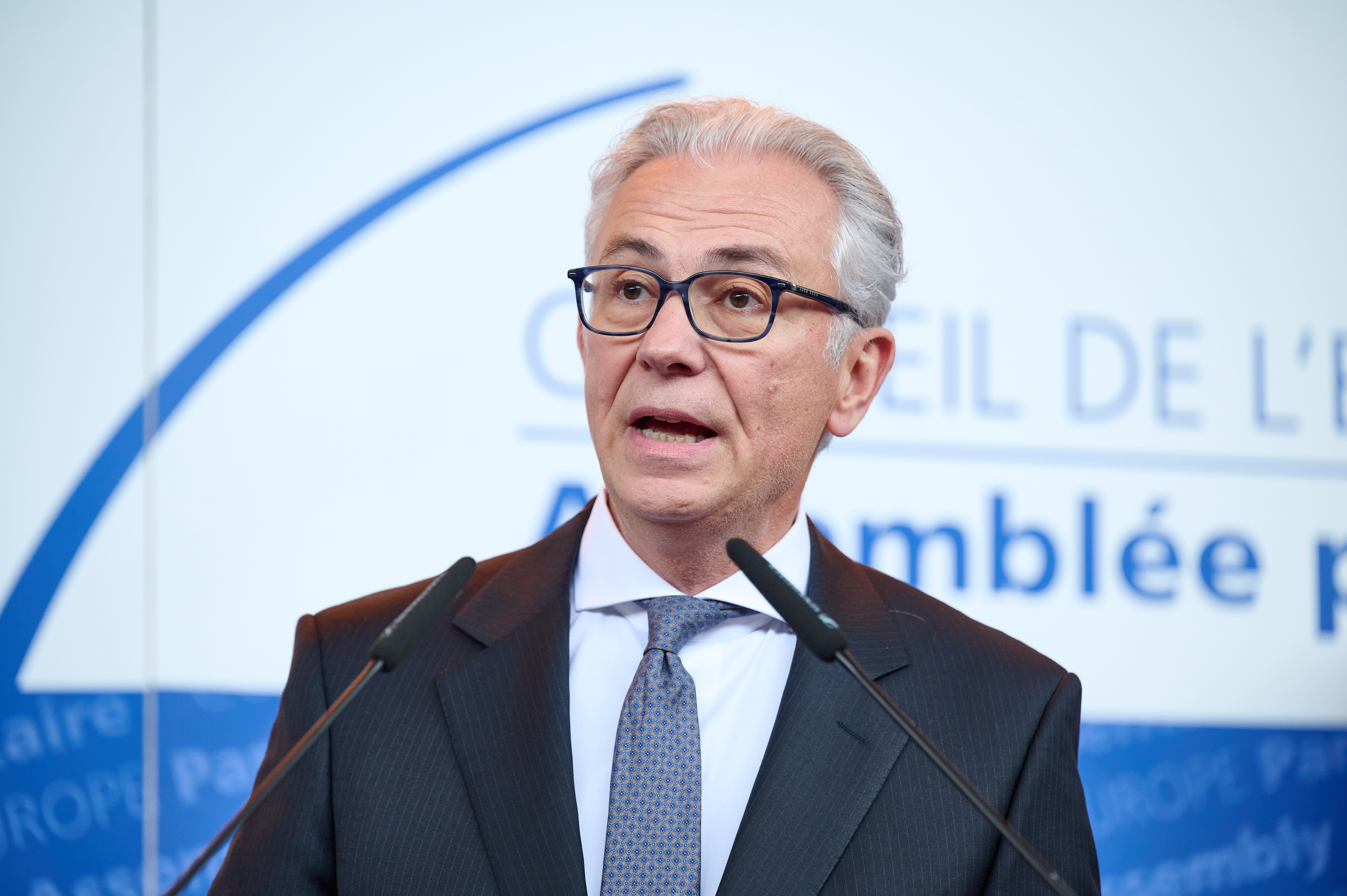

President of the Parliamentary Assembly of the Council of Europe
- In office 22 January 2024 – 25 January 2026
- Preceded by: Tiny Kox
- Succeeded by: Petra Bayr

Personal details
- Born: 13 September 1963 (age 63) Messinia, Greece
- Party: New Democracy (Greece)
- Spouse: Mara Zaharea
- Children: Vasilis; Anna
- Occupation: Politician
- Profession: Journalist, University Professor
- Website: roussopoulos.gr

Theodoros Roussopoulos (Greek: Θεόδωρος Ρουσόπουλος; born 13 September 1963) is a Greek journalist, politician and university professor. He entered politics in 2000 and served as the Minister of State and Government Spokesman from 7 March 2004 to 23 October 2008. He is currently an adjunct professor at the European University Cyprus and a Member of the Hellenic Parliament. He served as the President of the Parliamentary Assembly of the Council of Europe from 2024 to 2026.

== Career in Journalism ==
His journalism career begin in 1981 in the daily newspaper Eleftherotypia, where he remained until 1994. During this time, he also contributed to the monthly Elle magazine. He is a founding member of Mega Channel TV station, for which he worked from 1989 to 1999 as an editor-in-chief and political analyst. He also produced the "7+7" documentary program. From 1987 to 1989, he contributed to Athena 98.4 FM radio station as a founding member and, in 1999, to Star Channel TV station. He has also contributed from 1994 to 1999 to Messimvrini newspaper and Kathimerini newspaper as an analyst. In 1987 he was a member of the committee of ethics at "Piraeus Channel 1" and he is currently a publisher at Enastron publications.

== Political career ==
His political career began in 2000 with his appointment as New Democracy spokesman and press representative. After the 2004 general election, he was appointed as Minister of State and Government Spokesman by incoming Prime Minister Kostas Karamanlis.

As Minister of State, Roussopoulos was responsible for the Secretariat General of Communication and the Secretariat General of Information, which, since its abolition in 2004, incorporated the functions of Ministry of the Press and Mass Media.

In addition to his committee assignments, Rousopoulos has been a member of the Greek delegation to the Parliamentary Assembly of the Council of Europe (PACE) since 2019. In the Assembly, he serves on the Committee on Migration, Refugees and Displaced Persons (since 2019); the Sub-Committee on Refugee and Migrant Children and Young People (since 2022); the Sub-Committee on Diasporas and Integration (since 2022); the Sub-Committee on Migrant Smuggling and Trafficking in Human Beings (since 2022); and the Sub-Committee on Education, Youth and Sport (since 2019).

In 2024, Roussopoulos, a member of the New Democracy delegation, was elected as President of the Assembly for a one-year term. Like the rest of his delegation, he is part of the European People's Party group within the Assembly. As reaction to the cancellation of presidential elections in Romania he requested an urgent report by the Venice Commission about the conditions under which a constitutional court can invalidate elections drawing from the recent Romanian case. In January 2025 he was reelected with support from all five political groups and all its 612 Members.

=== The Vatopedi scandal ===
On October 23, 2008 the Vatopedi scandal prompted State Minister and government spokesperson Theodoros Roussopoulos to resign before Parliament's investigation. Roussopoulos, criticized for his alleged role in a property exchange, cited a desire to defend himself against corruption allegations. New Democracy's decision not to participate in a vote on a preliminary judicial inquiry, ensuring its failure, added controversy. An investigative committee, approved by Parliament, would examine potential government involvement. Roussopoulos, a former journalist, started his political career in 2000 and resigned amid scrutiny. Also, throughout the controversy his marriage to journalist Mara Zacharea faced ethical concerns. The situation sparked widespread condemnation and raised questions about political accountability.

Years later, all parties involved were ultimately cleared of wrongdoing. No convictions were handed down. Nevertheless, there were concerns about the depth of the investigation into the money laundering allegations, as reported by various news sources.

== Career in the Academia ==
From 1997 to 1999 he taught “Television & Politics: the debates between presidential candidates of parties and prime ministers” at the University of Athens as a teaching associate. Since 2009, he is a Lecturer at the Pepperdine University of California. In 2015 he finished his Ph.D. thesis at University of Edinburgh. He currently teaches Journalism as an adjunct professor at the European University of Cyprus since 2015.

== Personal life ==
He is married to the journalist Mara Zacharea (Μάρα Ζαχαρέα) and has two children, Vasilis and Anna.
