= Nico Marchetti =

Austrian politician (born 1990)

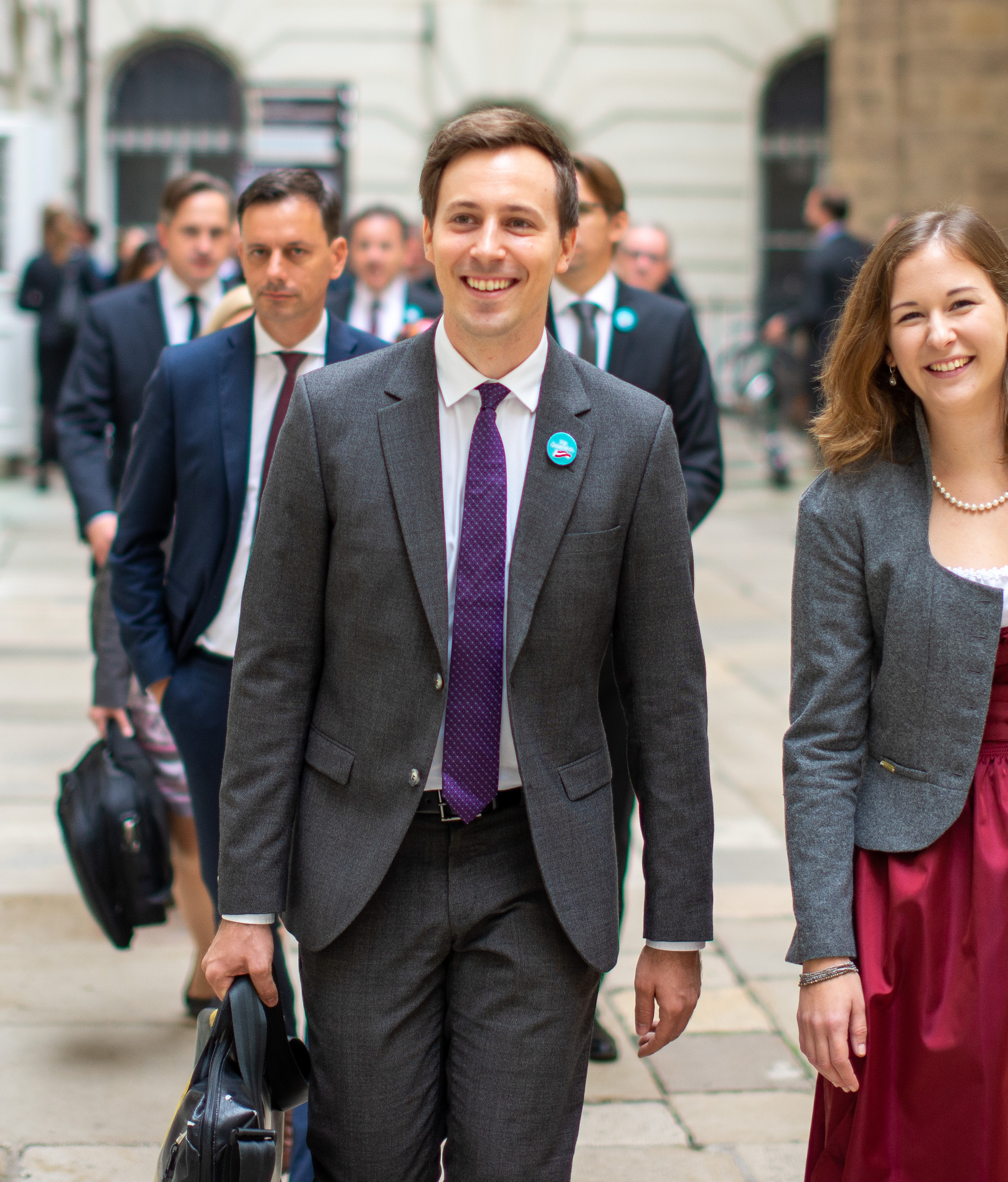
- Marchetti in 2019

Member of the National Council
- Incumbent
- Assumed office 9 November 2017
- Constituency: Vienna South

Personal details
- Born: 19 February 1990 (age 36)
- Party: Austrian People's Party

Nico Marchetti (born 19 February 1990) is an Austrian politician of the Austrian People's Party. Since 2017, he has been a member of the National Council. From 2015 to 2021, he was the leader of the Young People's Party in Vienna.

In June 2025, Marchetti married his husband.

In the 2025 controversy surrounding the Austrian Economic Chamber and Austrian Sozialpartnerschaft Marchetti defended former AEC president Harald Mahrer.
