= Damien Cottier =

Swiss politician (born 1975)

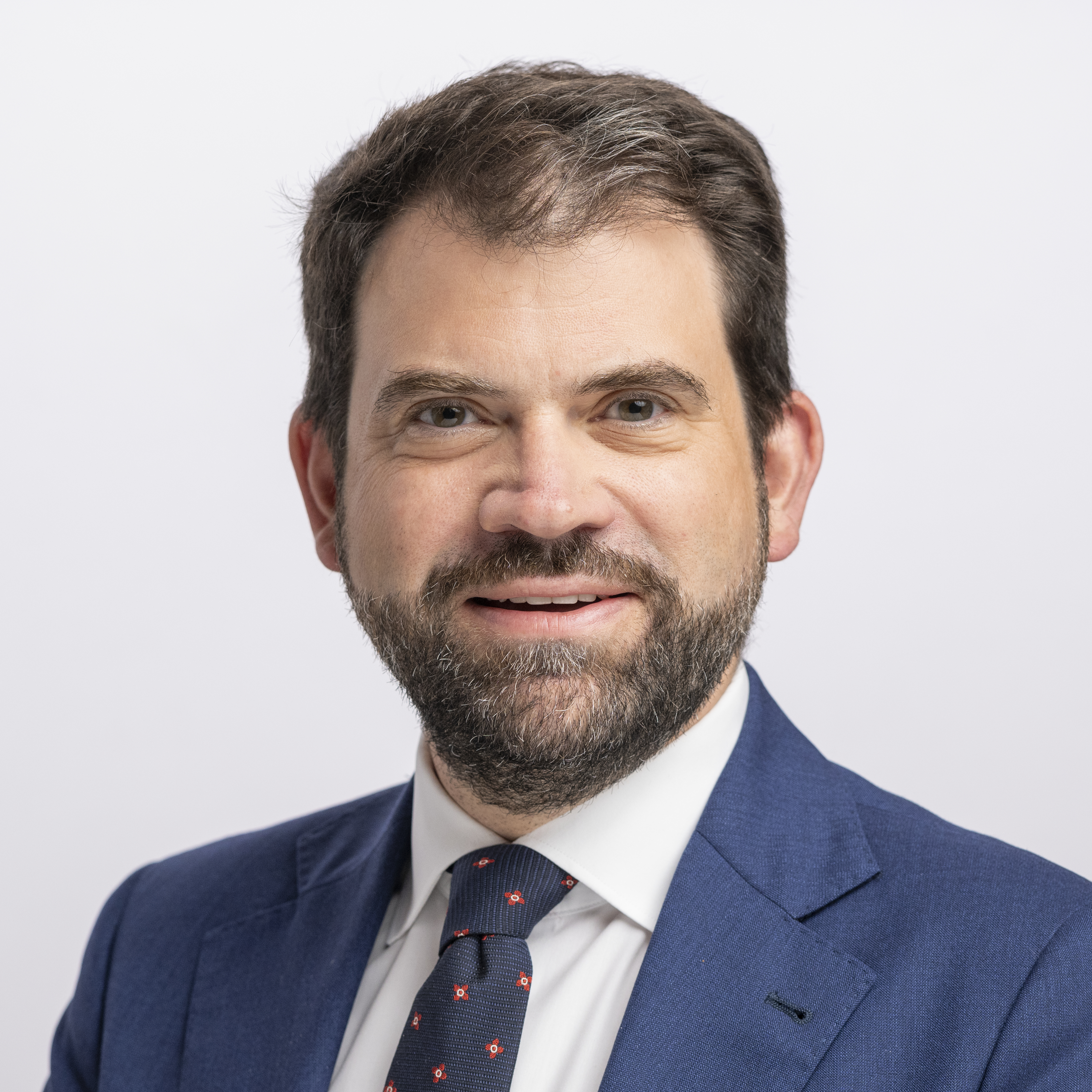
Damien Cottier (2023)

Damien Cottier (born April 3, 1975, in Neuchâtel) is a Swiss politician. He was elected to the National Council in 2019, where he represents Neuchâtel. He also represents Switzerland at the Parliamentary Assembly of the Council of Europe. Cottier is a member of the centre-right Radical-Liberal Party.

He holds a diploma in international relations from the Graduate Institute of International Studies in Geneva, and a master's in history, geography and political science from the University of Neuchatel.
