= Despina Louca =

American physicist

Despina A. Louca is an American condensed matter physicist and materials scientist from Cyprus. Her research involves the use of neutron scattering and X-ray scattering techniques to measure the behavior of materials with exotic electromagnetic and quantum properties including topological insulators, semimetals, antiferromagnets, helimagnets, and superconductors. She is the Maxine S. and Jesse W. Beams Professor of Physics at the University of Virginia, where she chairs the Department of Physics, and a former president of the Neutron Scattering Society of America.

== Education and career ==
Louca came to the United States as a Fulbright scholar from Cyprus. She received bachelor's and master's degrees from Bryn Mawr College, in 1990 and 1992 respectively. She completed her Ph.D. in materials science at the University of Pennsylvania in 1997. Her dissertation, Lattice Effects in Magnetoresistive La_{1−x}Sr_{x}MnO_{3} Manganites, was supervised by Takeshi Egami.

She was a postdoctoral researcher at the Los Alamos National Laboratory before joining the University of Virginia as an assistant professor in 1999. She received tenure there as an associate professor in 2005, and was promoted to full professor in 2011.

She was president of the Neutron Scattering Society of America for a four-year term beginning in 2017.

== Recognition ==
Louca was elected as a Fellow of the American Physical Society (APS) in 2014, after a nomination from the APS Division of Materials, "for demonstration of the importance of the local atomic structure for elucidating the physical properties of complex oxides including the transition metal oxides through neutron scattering using the pair-density-function analysis". She was named as a Fellow of the Neutron Scattering Society of America in 2022, "for her leadership as NSSA President and her numerous contributions to the study of local structure of functional quantum materials using neutron scattering".

She was the 2025 recipient of the quadrennial Anne Mayes Prize of the Neutron Scattering Society of America, given "for sustained and inspiring leadership within the North American neutron scattering community, dedicated mentorship and outreach to next-generation neutron scientists, and research excellence particularly as it relates to understanding structure-property relationships in quantum and topological materials".
