= Despina Chatzivassiliou-Tsovilis =

Greek government secretary

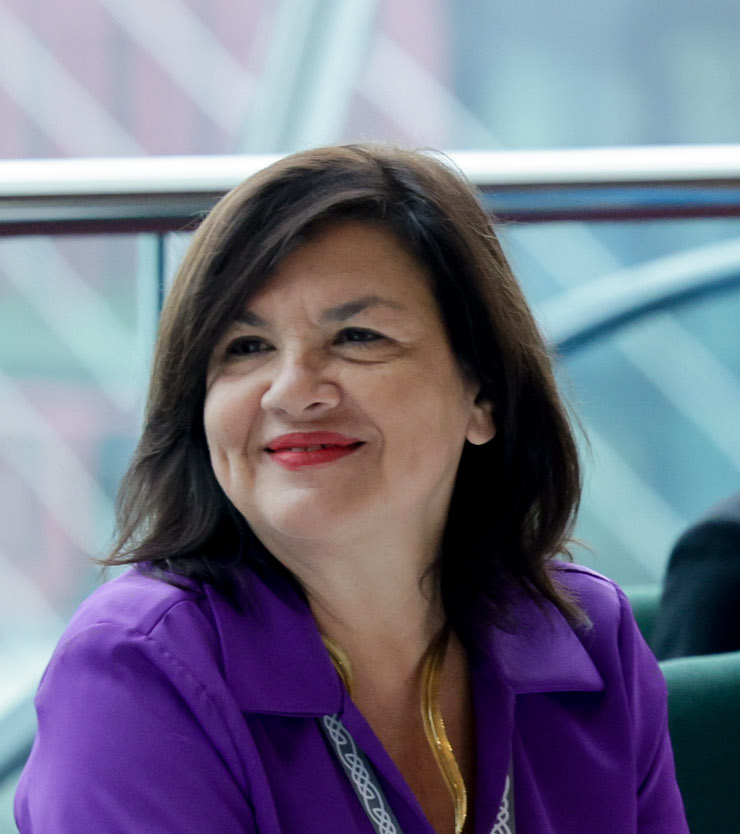
2023 image of Despina Chatzivassiliou-Tsovilis in Dublin

Despina Chatzivassiliou is a Greek lawyer and senior official of the Council of Europe, who has served as the Secretary General of the Parliamentary Assembly of the Council of Europe (PACE) since 1 March 2021. She is both the first woman and the first Greek to hold the position since the Assembly’s creation in 1949. She was unanimously re-elected on 30 September 2025 for a second five-year term beginning on 1 March 2026.

== Early career ==
Ms Chatzivassiliou began her career at the Council of Europe in 1993 at the European Commission of Human Rights. She later worked for the Secretariat of the Committee of Ministers of the Council of Europe, including in human resources management, before joining the Parliamentary Assembly of the Council of Europe. For more than two decades she headed, in turn, the secretariats of the Monitoring Committee and the Political Affairs and Democracy Committee, advising successive Assembly Presidents, committee Chairs and Secretaries General.

== Secretary General of the Parliamentary Assembly ==
In her motivation letter prior to her 2021 election, Chatzivassiliou identified as priorities the reform of the Assembly to enhance its impact across the Council of Europe’s member States, the strengthening of cooperation with national parliaments, the modernisation of working methods and more effective use of the Organisation’s potential. She described PACE as an essential forum for dialogue, stating: “I have the conviction that it is only by working together that we can make a difference […] I am a staunch supporter of the values of democracy, the rule of law and human rights which I have sworn to serve.”

As Secretary General, she oversees the functioning of the Assembly, coordinates its multinational secretariat, implements decisions made by parliamentarians, and supports the President, the 612 members plus observers and partners for democracy delegations. Her work focuses on strengthening relations with parliamentary delegations and national parliaments, modernising procedures through digitalisation and the use of artificial intelligence and increasing the visibility and impact of the Assembly’s activities.

Ms Chatzivassiliou has also prioritised gender equality and women’s empowerment. During her tenure, gender representation within PACE reached parity for the first time in the Assembly’s history, she launched the “Women@PACE” initiative to support women parliamentarians and staff, and also strongly supported the establishment of a new Prize recognising achievements in advancing women’s empowerment: the Vigdís Prize.

Second term

On 30 September 2025, Chatzivassiliou was unanimously re-elected by members of the Assembly for a second five-year term. Following her re-election, she expressed her intention to continue working “with the same passion and commitment […] to defend the values of our Organisation and assist you in making the voice of PACE heard as loudly as possible.”

== Education ==
Studied at the Italian High School of Athens.. She then obtained her law degree from the National and Kapodistrian University of Athens and a PhD in law from the European University Institute in Florence, Italy, where she specialised in the European Convention on Human Rights and worked as a research assistant to jurist Antonio Cassese.

== Personal life ==
She speaks Greek, English, French and Italian. Outside her institutional work she has taught classical guitar. She has two children, Ilia and Charles.
