= Despina Stokou =

Greek artist

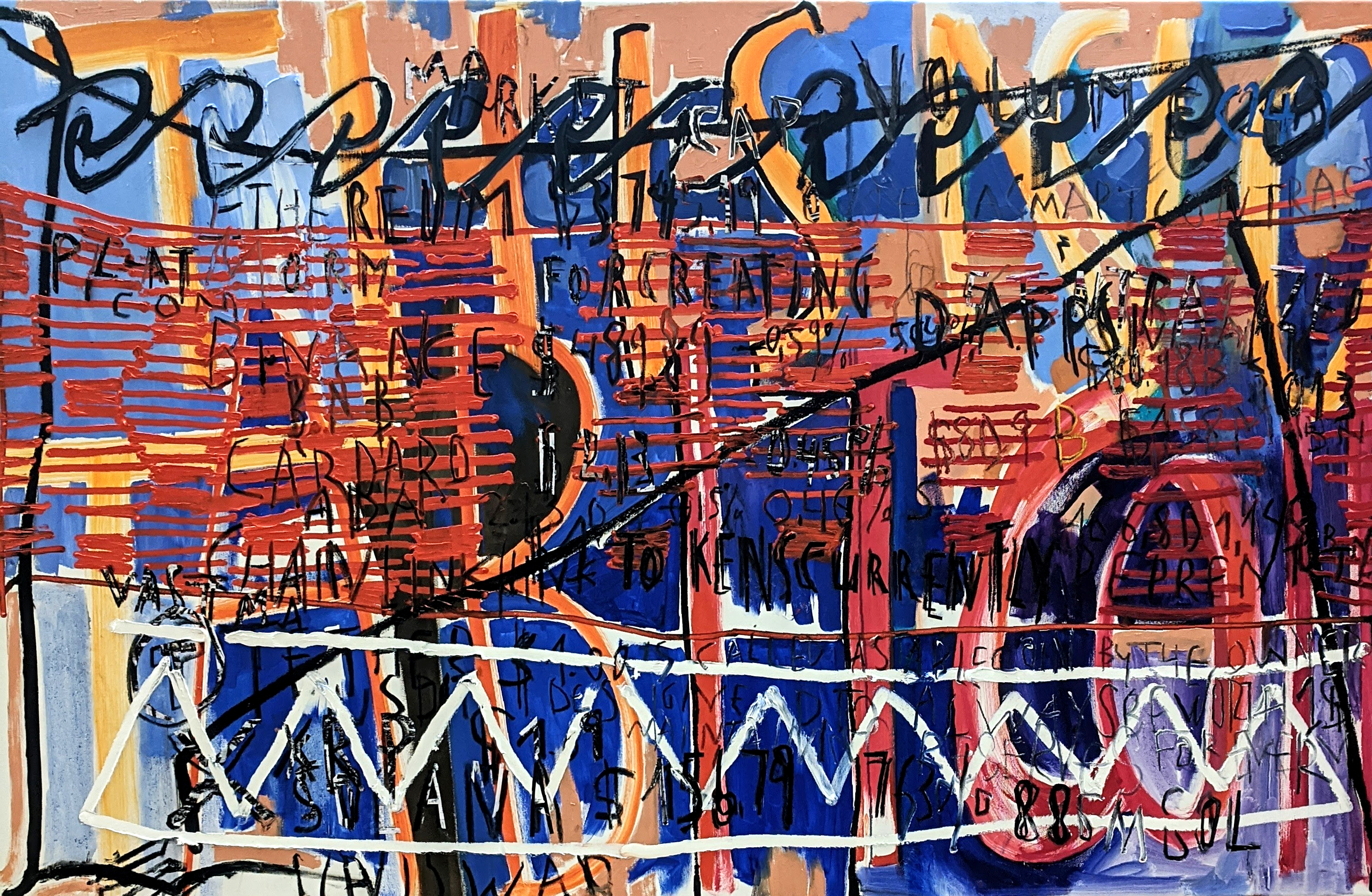
- Courtesy of the artist and Derek Eller Gallery
- Born: 1978 (age 47–48); Athens, Greece
- Known for: Painting
- Website: http://www.derekeller.com/artists/despina-stokou

Despina Stokou (born 1978 in Athens, Greece) is a contemporary artist, writer and curator based in Los Angeles, California. She primarily produces gestural, expressive paintings, often large and displaying vivid color, that include layered collage elements like cut paper letters spelling out pointed phrases and topical passages that tumble and pile up across her canvases.

== Background and education ==
Raised in Saudi Arabia and Athens, Greece, Stokou is the child of civil engineers. She attended the German School of Athens in her youth. After first earning a degree in 1998 from the Technical Institute for Marketing and Publicity in Athens and then graduating from the Athens School of Fine Arts in 2002, Stokou received a DAAD Artists-in-Berlin Program scholarship to study at the University of Fine Arts Berlin in the “Art in Context” department. In 2005, she received a Master of Arts there and remained in Berlin for the subsequent decade: “What attracted me to the city was this whole open space. I mean that in the spiritual sense also, not only the city itself.” In addition to her studio-based painting practice, Stokou was very active on the Berlin art scene and within the artist community there. In 2015, Stokou moved to Los Angeles. Despina Stokou becomes new professor for Contextual Painting (after Ashley Hans Scheirl) at the Academy of Fine Arts Vienna.

== Painting ==
Stokou is known for transposing swaths of online textual data onto canvas. Boiling her painterly impulse down to an essence, she has said: “What I really try to create is a dialogue, a monologue, if you will. I’m very interested in communication and the way information passes…I look at the text and I want to paint it.” Her engagement with and use of text draws mainly from digital platforms and messages, tracking not only the content of social exchanges but the contemporary infrastructure that bears them as well. Tangled layers of text appear at points legible and illegible beneath abstract smears and swipes of color that together convey a sense of amped up, frenetic energy characteristic of her work. Writing in The New York Times, Roberta Smith described Stokou's paintings in her 2013 exhibition, “Bulletproof” at Derek Eller Gallery, where “[m]oments of legibility rise to the surface and then sink back into the works’ eccentric, generally monochromatic tactility...Stokou's loquacious, streetwise paintings build on precedents from Cy Twombly, Jean-Michel Basquiat, Suzanne McClellan and Sean Landers to conjure an impression of colliding voices, opinions and needs.”

== Exhibitions ==
Stokou has had solo exhibitions at Derek Eller Gallery (New York City), Praz-Delavallade (Los Angeles), Eigen + Art (Leipzig), EIGEN + ART Lab (Berlin), Appartement (Berlin), Galerie Krobath (Vienna), Apt Gallery (London), and Kalfayan Galleries (Athens). She has also exhibited at Kunstverein Gera (Gera, Germany), KW Institute of Contemporary Art (Berlin), Midway Contemporary Art (Minneapolis), and the Center for Contemporary Arts (Glasgow, UK), among other institutions. Her work is held in numerous private and public collections such as the Deutsche Bank Collection; NBK collection, Schwartz Collection, Harvard; and Zabludowicz Collection.

== Writing ==
As a writer, Stokou has been a strong voice for women in arts, publishing polemical texts that are both provocative and highly entertaining, such as her article “Art is Genderful! An Artist’s Notes on Navigating a Sexist System” (2016). Her writing is distinctively playful, acerbic, and incisively cutting. Her writing has appeared in publications including Hyperallergenic, Artslant, Modern Painters, and Monopol. In 2010, Stokou founded Bpigs (bpigs.com), the independent artist-run art guide to Berlin, which she continues to edit and publish.

== Curatorial projects ==
She directed the curatorial program at Grimmuseum (an artist-run space in Kreuzberg) at its inception from 2009-2011. While at Grimmuseum, she organized “The Curators Battle” (2011) with curators Aaron Moulton and Carson Chan facing off in competing shows featuring the same artists, she curated “Madonna Psycho Slut,” an exhibition of twenty-one women artists, and produced the exhibition series, “Dirty Dozen (D12), a series of two double shows where a gallery director, an art critic, an artist and a curator were asked to conceive a show as their alter ego” (2010).

== Personal life ==
Stokou is a single mom by choice and a vocal advocate for women's and LGBTQ people's rights to reproductive technology.
