= Despina Papadopoulou =

Greek footballer

Personal information
- Date of birth: 28 February 1979 (age 47)
- Position: Midfielder

International career^{‡}
Years	Team	Apps	(Gls)
1997	Greece U18	2	(0)
–2012	Greece	8	(0)
- ‡ National team caps and goals as of 4 April 2012

Despina Papadopoulou (Greek: Δέσποινα Παπαδοπούλου; born 28 February 1979) is a Greek former footballer who played as a midfielder. She has been a member of the Greece women's national team.
