= Anne Brasseur =

Luxembourgish politician (born 1950)

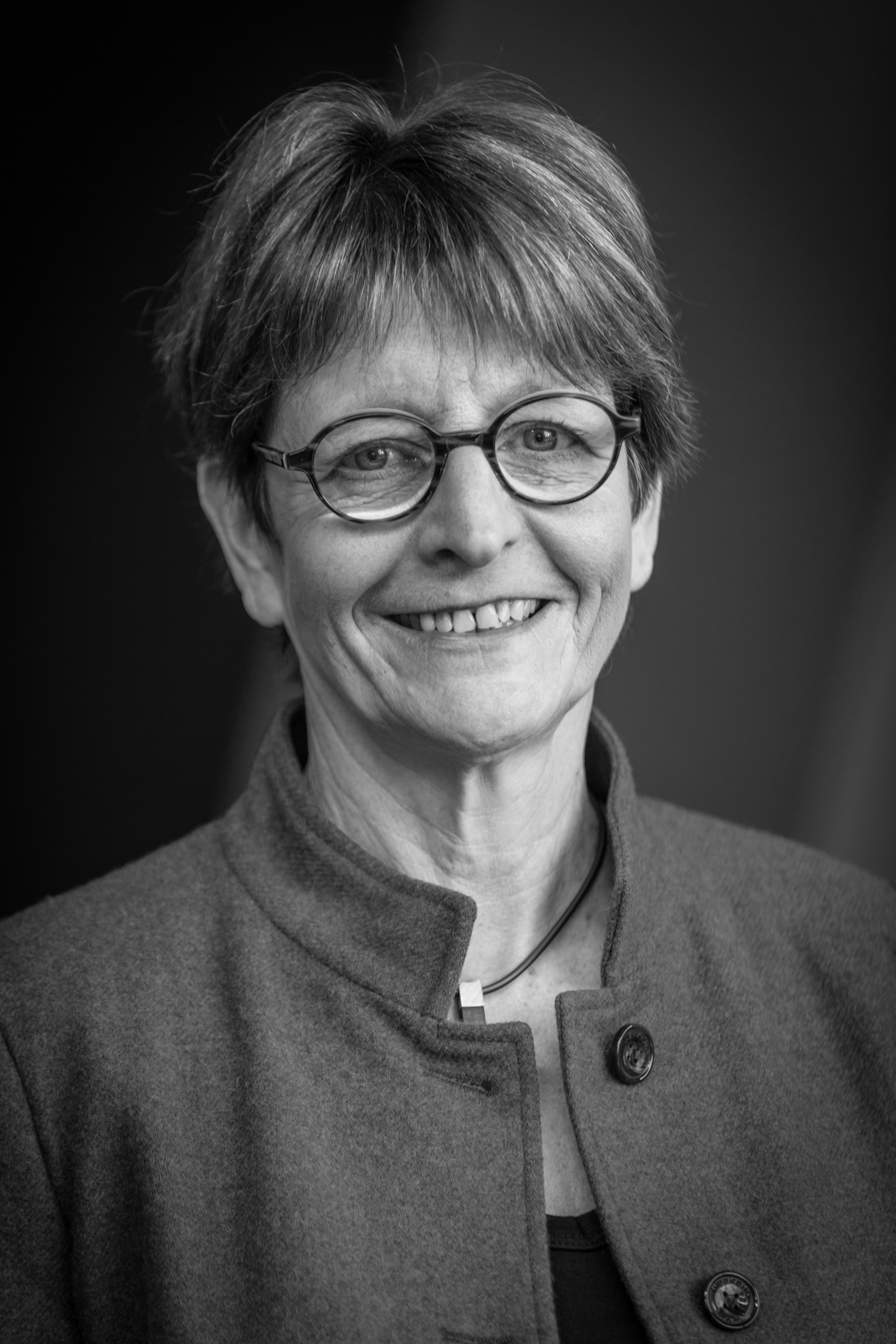
- Brasseur in 2015

Member of the Parliamentary Assembly of the Council of Europe
- Incumbent
- Assumed office 2009
- Parliamentary group: Alliance of Liberals and Democrats for Europe

Minister for National Education, Vocational Training and Sports
- In office 1999–2004
- Prime Minister: Jean-Claude Juncker

Personal details
- Born: 19 May 1950 (age 76) Luxembourg
- Party: Democratic Party

Anne Brasseur (born 19 May 1950) is a Luxembourgish politician and former sports and training minister. On 28 January 2014 Brasseur was elected as the President of the Parliamentary Assembly of the Council of Europe (PACE) for a one-year renewable term, the second woman to hold this post.

== Political career ==
Brasseur began her political career when she was elected to the city council of Luxembourg in 1976. She was the president of the Association des Femmes Libérales. (ANSFL)

=== Minister for National Education, Vocational Training and Sports, 1999–2004 ===
From 1999 to 2004 Brasseur was a cabinet minister of Luxembourg, Minister for National Education, Vocational Training and Sports (Ministre de l'Éducation nationale, de la Formation professionnelle et des Sports), in the government of Prime Minister Jean-Claude Juncker.

=== Parliamentary Assembly of the Council of Europe, 2009–present ===
From 2009 to 2014, Brasseur was president of The Alliance of Liberals and Democrats for Europe in the Parliamentary Assembly of the Council of Europe (ALDE-PACE). In January 2014, she was elected President of the Parliamentary Assembly of the Council of Europe; she received an absolute majority of votes in the first round. On 26 January 2015, she was re-elected for a new mandate of one year. From 2016 to 2018, she had served as a member of the Committee on Legal Affairs and Human Rights; the Sub-Committee on Crime Problems and the Fight against Terrorism; and the Sub-Committee on the Middle East and the Arab World.

== Political positions ==
=== On Russia ===
Early in Brasseur's tenure as president of PACE, the assembly in April 2014 suspended the Russian delegation's voting rights after the Russian annexation of Crimea in March 2014. Throughout her time in office, she maintained a constant dialogue with Russian Duma Speaker Sergey Naryshkin and Russia's PACE delegates.

=== On Azerbaijan ===
On a 2014 visit to Azerbaijan, a member country of the Council of Europe, Brasseur criticized that "[i]n certain areas, such as freedom of expression, freedom of association and freedom of assembly, the situation appears to have deteriorated and this has to be addressed urgently." In particular, she expressed her hope that Azeri human rights activist Ilgar Mammadov would soon be released, after the European Court of Human Rights had earlier described his imprisonment as an "unjustified restriction of freedom".

=== On Poland ===
Brasseur criticized Poland's judiciary reform. She called on Polish politicians "not to enact, precipitously, legislation relating to the Constitutional Tribunal which may seriously undermine the rule of law."

=== On education ===
In June 2007, the Council of Europe's Committee on Culture, Science and Education released a report entitled "The Dangers of Creationism in Education." According to Brasseur, who served as co-author of the report, its goal was to firmly anchor the theory of evolution in school curricula. However, she was later pressured to shorten references in the resolution to "evolution by natural selection" to "evolution" because some members had misunderstood the reference to natural selection to be an attack on their religious beliefs. The council ultimately approved the report's recommendations, with 48 votes in favor and 25 against.

== Other activities ==
- Nuremberg International Human Rights Award, Member of the Jury
