= Iulian Bulai =

Romanian politician (born 1987)

Iulian Bulai (born 1987) is a Romanian Center Right-wing politician. He was elected to the Chamber of Deputies in 2016 and re-elected in 2020. Since June 2022, deputy Iulian Bulai is the Chairperson of the ALDE Group at the Parliamentary Assembly of the Council Of Europe.

== Early life and education ==
Bulai was born in 1987 in Neamț County, Romania.

He completed his education at the Franciscan High School. In 2008, Bulai enrolled at the Einar Granum Art School in Oslo, Norway. He later transferred to the National Academy of Arts in Oslo and studied there from 2009 to 2012, earning a BA in visual arts. In 2011, he participated in an Erasmus Programme at the Academy of Arts in Lisbon.

In 2012, Bulai began his master's studies at the Central Academy of Fine Arts in Beijing before continuing his education at the National Academy of Arts in Oslo. In 2014, he started a second master's degree with a focus on international relations and cultural diplomacy. The first semester of this program was undertaken at the Institute of Cultural Diplomacy in Berlin, while the second semester was conducted in Siena, Italy.

== Political career ==
In 2016, Bulai returned to Romania and became the founding president of the Neamț County Save Romania Union (USR) chapter. Subsequently, he participated in the parliamentary elections. From the beginning of his political activity, Iulian Bulai campaigned for the importance of building the A7 (Ploiești – Pașcani) and A8 (Târgu-Mureș – Iași – Ungheni) highways, which would connect the region of Moldova with the other historical regions of Romania. Bulai was a liaison in terms of communication and interaction between civil society and central authorities. As the USR Neamț's primary candidate, he was elected to the Parliament of Romania.

During his 2016–2020 term, Bulai served on multiple committees. He was part of the Culture, Arts, and Mass Media committee; the Equal Opportunities for Women and Men committee, where he served as vice-president until September 2019; and the European Affairs committee from September 2019 onwards. In addition, he held roles as the USR parliamentary group's deputy leader from February to December 2020 and served as the Chamber of Deputies' secretary between September 2018 and February 2019. He put forward 151 legislative proposals, with significant ones addressing adoption laws, the Magnitsky law, and the discontinuation of certain state-funded institutions.

In the parliamentary elections on December 6, 2020, Bulai was the lead candidate for USR PLUS in Neamț county. He secured a subsequent term in the Romanian Parliament. Currently, in his term, he leads the Committee on Culture, Arts, and Mass Media and serves as a member of the Committee on European Affairs.

In addition to his committee assignments, Bulai has been a member of the Romanian delegation to the Parliamentary Assembly of the Council of Europe since 2019, where he became a member of its Monitoring Commission. By September 2019, he was elected vice-president of the Union Save Romania party. His report led, in October 2023, to a resolution significant for Ukraine and Europe's history. PACE condemned Russia's ongoing war of aggression against Ukraine, stressing the importance of upholding Council of Europe standards and calling for "a united front to stop the aggression and win a peace which is comprehensive, just and lasting, ensuring that the rule of law prevails over the rule of force."
