= Harald Stefan =

Austrian politician (born 1965)

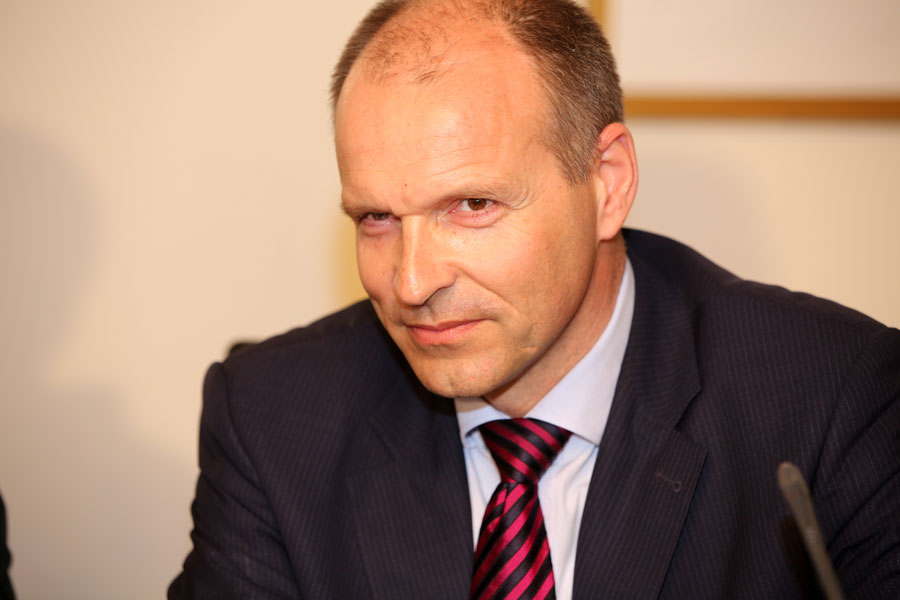

Member of the National Council
- Incumbent
- Assumed office 28 October 2008
- Constituency: B Bundeswahlvorschlag

Personal details
- Born: 12 September 1965 (age 60)
- Party: Freedom Party of Austria

Harald Stefan (born 12 September 1965) is an Austrian politician who has been a Member of the National Council for the Freedom Party of Austria (FPÖ) since 2008.
