= Harald Troch =

Austrian politician

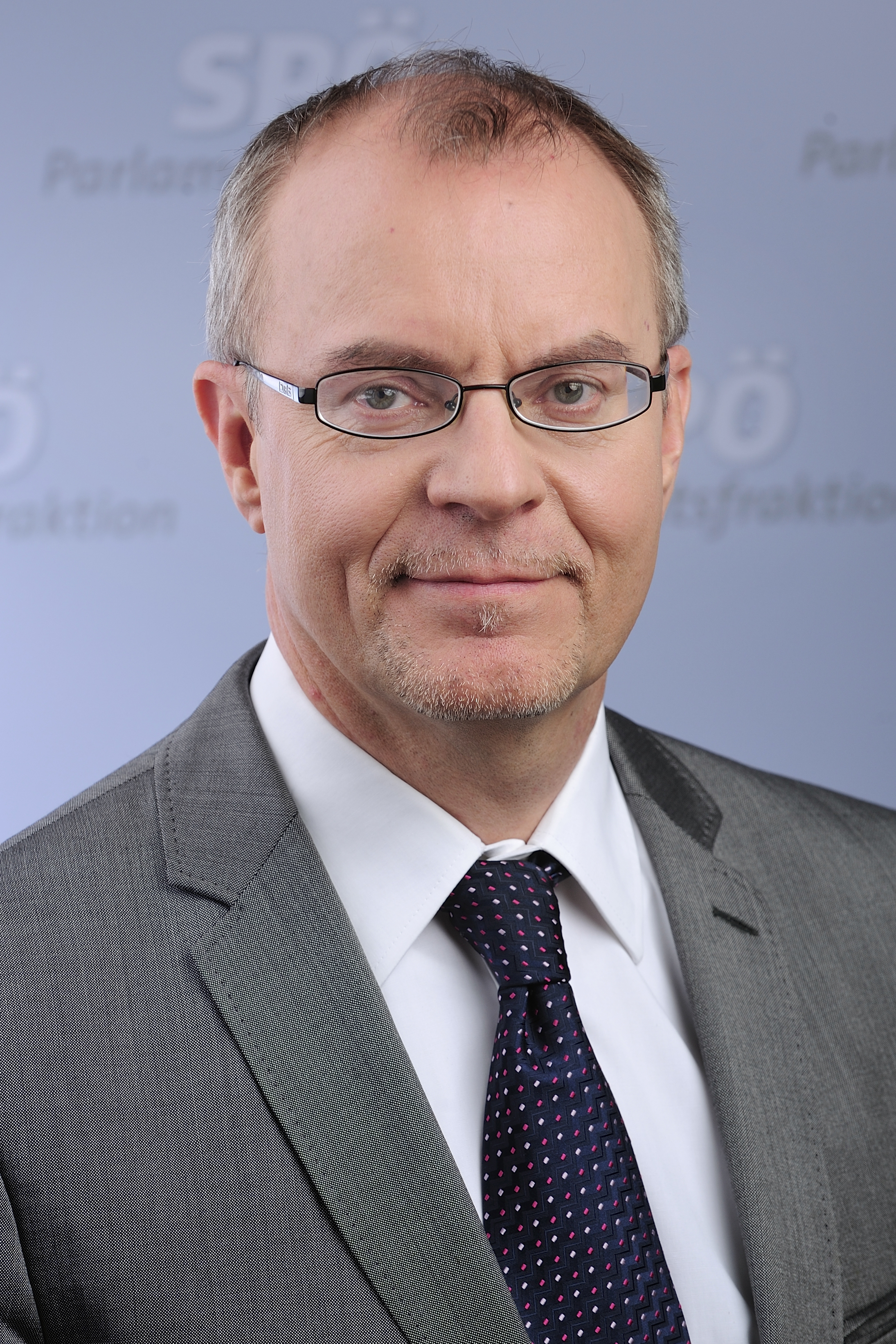
- Harald Troch in 2014
- Born: May 2, 1959 (age 65)

Harald Troch (born May 2, 1959) is a member of parliament in Social Democratic Party in Austria.
