= Hubert Fuchs =

Austrian politician (born 1969)

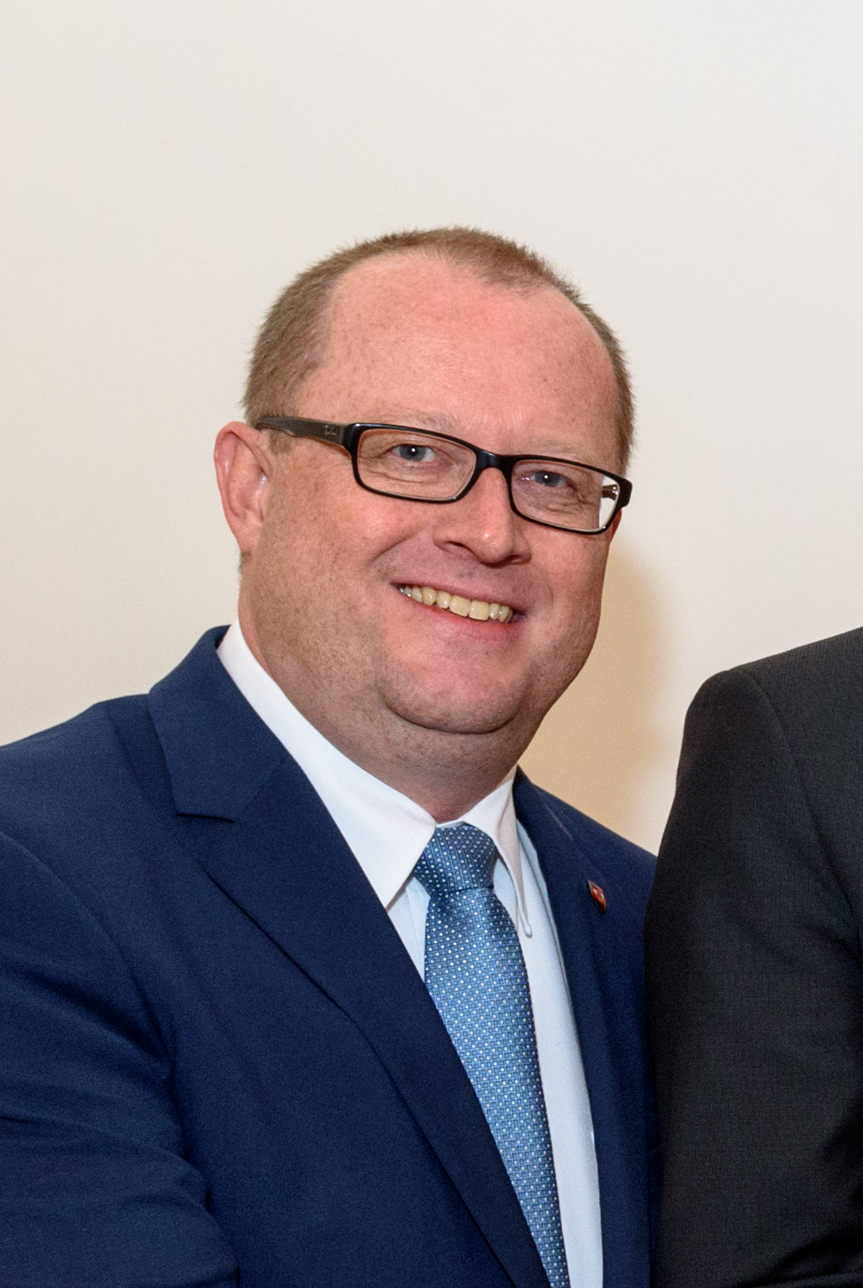

State Secretary of Finance
- In office 18 December 2017 – 22 May 2019
- Chancellor: Sebastian Kurz
- Minister: Hartwig Löger

Member of the National Council
- In office 29 October 2013 – 19 December 2017
- Nominated by: Heinz-Christian Strache
- Affiliation: Freedom Party

Personal details
- Born: 13 January 1969 (age 57)
- Party: Freedom Party

Hubert Fuchs (born 13 January 1969) is an Austrian politician. He was the state secretary of the Ministry of Finance in the first Kurz government, serving from December 2017 to May 2019. Previously, he served as a Member of the National Council for the Freedom Party of Austria (FPÖ) from 2013 to 2017.
