= Parliamentary Assembly of the Council of Europe =

Parliamentary assembly

- Logo

History
- Founded: 10 August 1949; 77 years ago

Leadership
- President: Petra Bayr
- Secretary General: Despina Chatzivassiliou-Tsovilis
- Seats: 306

Meeting place
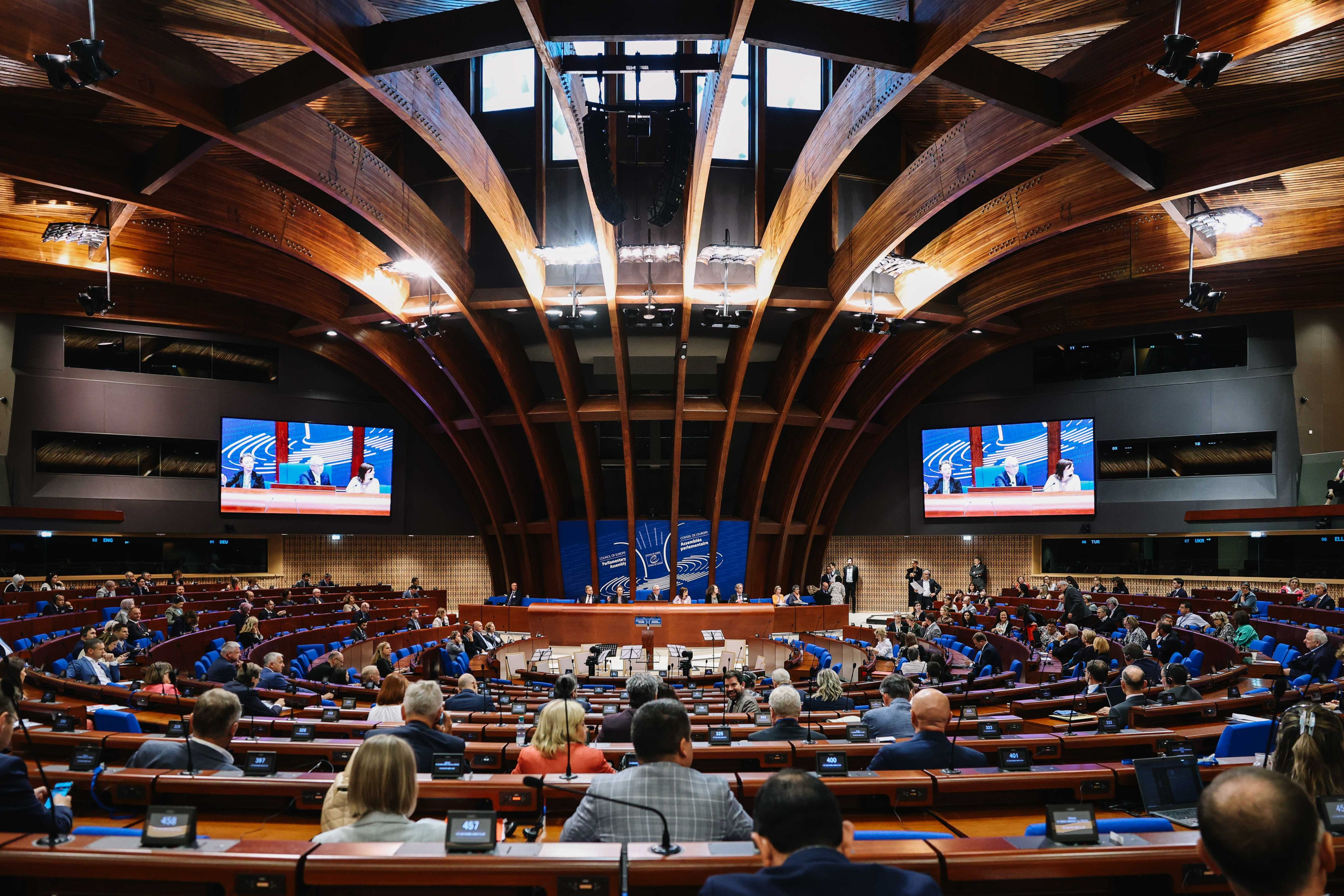
- Palace of Europe, Strasbourg, France

Website
- pace.coe.int

The Parliamentary Assembly of the Council of Europe (PACE) is the parliamentary arm of the Council of Europe, a 46-nation international organisation dedicated to upholding human rights, democracy and the rule of law.

The Assembly is made up of 306 members drawn from the national parliaments of the Council of Europe's member states, and meets four times a year for week-long plenary sessions in Strasbourg.

It is one of the two statutory bodies of the Council of Europe, along with the Committee of Ministers, the executive body representing governments, with which it holds an ongoing dialogue. However, it is the Assembly which is usually regarded as the "motor" of the organisation, holding governments to account on human rights issues, pressing states to maintain democratic standards, proposing fresh ideas and generating the momentum for reform.

The Assembly held its first session in Strasbourg on 10 August 1949, embodying at that time the hopes of many Europeans who, in the aftermath of World War II, saw European unity as the best way of preventing a return to the devastation of war, a "safety net" to prevent gross human rights violations such as the horrors of the Holocaust, and a democratic bulwark against tyranny.

Among the Assembly's main achievements are:

- ending the death penalty in Europe amongst signatories by requiring new member states to stop all executions;
- making possible, and providing a blueprint for, the European Convention on Human Rights;
- high-profile reports exposing violations of human rights in Council of Europe member states;
- assisting former Soviet countries to embrace democracy after 1989;
- inspiring and helping to shape many progressive new national laws;
- helping member states to overcome conflict or reach consensus on divisive political or social issues; and
- adopting the Flag of Europe and the Anthem of Europe, both later taken up by the European Union.

== Powers ==
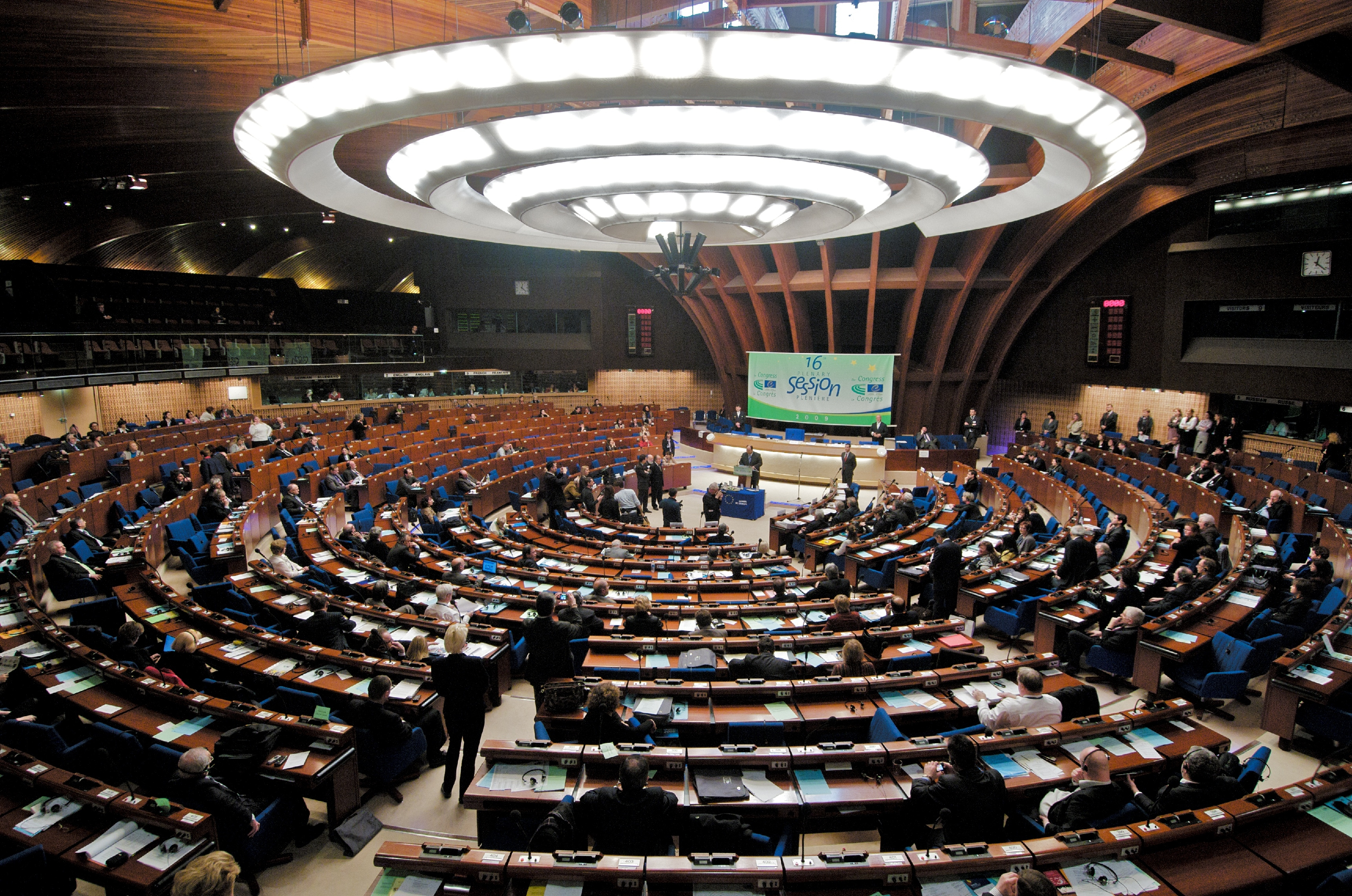
The hemicycle of the PACE at the Palace of Europe

Unlike the European Parliament (an institution of the European Union), the Assembly does not have the power to create binding laws. However, it speaks on behalf of 700 million Europeans and has the power to:

- demand action from the 46 Council of Europe governments, who – acting through the organisation's executive body – must jointly reply
- probe human rights violations in any of the member states
- question Prime Ministers and Heads of State on any subject
- send parliamentarians to observe elections and mediate over crises
- set the terms on which states may join the Council of Europe, through its power of veto
- inspire, propose and help to shape new national laws
- request legal evaluations of the laws and constitutions of member states
- sanction a member state by recommending its exclusion or suspension

Important statutory functions of PACE are the election of the judges of the European Court of Human Rights, from a list of three candidates submitted by governments, as well as the leading officials of the Council of Europe.

In general the Assembly meets four times per year in Strasbourg at the Palace of Europe for week-long plenary sessions. The nine permanent committees of the Assembly meet all year long to prepare reports and draft resolutions in their respective fields of expertise.

The Assembly sets its own agenda, but its debates and reports are primarily focused on the Council of Europe's three core statutory aims, defending human rights, promoting democracy and upholding the rule of law.

=== Election of judges to the European Court of Human Rights ===
Judges of the European Court of Human Rights are elected by PACE from a list of three candidates nominated by each member state which has ratified the European Convention on Human Rights. A 20-member committee made up of parliamentarians with legal experience – meeting in camera – interviews all candidates for judge on the Court and assesses their CVs before making recommendations to the full Assembly, which elects one judge from each shortlist in a secret vote. Judges are elected for a period of nine years and may not be re-elected.

Although the European Convention does not, in itself, require member states to present a multi-sex shortlist of potential appointees, in a 2004 resolution PACE decided that it "will not consider lists of candidates where the list does not include at least one candidate of each sex" unless there are exceptional circumstances. As a result, around one-third of the current bench of 46 judges are women, making the Court a leader among international courts on gender balance.

== Achievements ==
=== Birthplace of the European Convention on Human Rights ===
At its very first meeting, in the summer of 1949, the Parliamentary Assembly adopted the essential blueprint of what became the European Convention on Human Rights, selecting which rights should be protected and defining the outline of the judicial mechanism to enforce them. Its detailed proposal, with some changes, was eventually adopted by the Council of Europe's ministerial body, and entered into force in 1953. Today, seventy years later, the European Court of Human Rights – given shape and form during the Assembly's historic post-war debates – is regarded as a global standard-bearer for justice, protecting the rights of citizens in 46 European nations and beyond, and paving the way for the gradual convergence of human rights laws and practice across the continent. The Assembly continues to elect the judges of the Court.

=== Originator of the European flag and anthem ===
The Assembly was at the origin of both the Flag of Europe, the twelve yellow stars on a blue background, and the Anthem of Europe, an arrangement of Ludwig van Beethoven's Ode to Joy. Having been proposed by the Assembly, both were adopted firstly by the Council of Europe, and - several years later - by the European Union. Both are now known worldwide as symbols of Europe.

==== Flag of Europe ====
Various proposals for a flag were submitted to the Council of Europe in the early 1950s and on 25 September 1953 the Assembly officially adopted a version with fifteen stars, which represented the number of Council of Europe member states at the time. However "a difficulty arose" in the Council of Europe's ministerial body over the number of stars after West Germany objected that one was for the Saarland region, which was then under French control and did not rejoin Germany until 1957. It would have agreed to fourteen stars, but this was in turn unacceptable to France. Two years later, after further consultations, the twelve-star version was unanimously approved by both bodies of the Council of Europe, with twelve being regarded as a symbol of perfection, and no longer related to the number of states in the organisation. The institutions of the European Union began using the flag in 1986.

==== Anthem of Europe ====
Propositions for an anthem for Europe began almost as soon as the Council of Europe was created in 1949. "Ode to Joy" had been suggested in the 1920s by the great pioneer of European unity, Count Richard von Coudenhove-Kalergi, and in a 1955 letter to the Council of Europe he proposed it again. However it was not until the early 1970s that the question was taken up by the Assembly's Committee on Regional Planning and Local Authorities. The parliamentarians saw an anthem as the next logical step, after the creation of the European flag in 1955 and Europe Day in 1964, to "spread the European idea" and - after initial discussion of a possible Europe-wide competition - the committee decided that a piece of music without words would overcome the problem of multiple languages in Europe. The committee agreed Beethoven was "justly regarded as one of the great European geniuses", and that his tune "had universal value". In a resolution adopted on 8 July 1971, the Assembly formally proposed "Ode to Joy" as the European anthem. The proposal found favour with the Council of Europe's Committee of Ministers, which formally adopted the anthem in 1972. It was subsequently taken up by the EU in 1985.

=== Ending the death penalty in Europe ===
In 1973 Swedish PACE member Astrid Bergegren first put forward a motion inviting member states to abolish the death penalty. Momentum built in the following years, and by 1980 the Assembly was calling on Europe's parliaments to abolish it, and insisting that the "right to life" included in the European Convention on Human Rights implied a ban on state killing. In 1989 the Assembly took the decision to make ending executions a condition of Council of Europe membership - just before a wave of central and eastern European nations joined the organisation. Today, the death penalty has been abolished in law in all 46 member states in peacetime, though some continue to allow it in time of war. Though rare calls are occasionally heard for its reintroduction, abolition continent-wide is now regarded as a major achievement of the Council of Europe as a whole, and it now joins others in pressing for abolition worldwide.

=== Support for emerging democracies ===
Over the decades, the Assembly has been at the forefront of supporting democratic change in successive waves of European nations at key moments in their history, negotiating their entry into the Council of Europe "club of democracies" (as the Assembly has a veto on any new member joining the organisation, it has used this power to negotiate with applicant countries the conditions on which they join). In the 1950s it led the way in embracing recently defeated Germany, in the 1960s it took a strong stand during the Greek crisis, and in the 1970s it welcomed post-Franco Spain and Portugal into the democratic fold. Above all, it played a key role after the fall of the Iron Curtain in 1989, creating a path towards membership for former Communist countries with its "Special Guest status", paving the way for the historic reconciliation of European nations under one roof.

=== Exposing torture in CIA black sites in Europe ===
In two reports for the Assembly in 2006 and 2007, Swiss Senator and former Prosecutor Dick Marty revealed convincing evidence that terror suspects were being transported to, held and tortured in CIA-run "secret prisons" on European soil. The evidence in his first report in 2006 – gathered with the help of investigative journalists and plane-spotters among others – suggested that a number of Council of Europe member states had permitted CIA "rendition flights" across their airspace, enabling the secret transfer of terror suspects without any legal rights. In a second report in 2007, Marty showed how two member states – Poland and Romania – had allowed "secret prisons" to be established on their territory, where torture took place. His main conclusions – subsequently confirmed in a series of rulings by the European Court of Human Rights, as well as a comprehensive US Senate report – threw the first real light on a dark chapter in US and European history in the aftermath of the 11 September attacks, kicked off a series of national probes, and helped to make torture on European soil less likely.

=== Sanctions against the Russian delegation ===
In April 2014, after the Russian parliament's backing for the annexation of Crimea and Russo-Ukrainian War, the Assembly decided to suspend the Russian delegation's voting rights as well as the right of Russian members to be represented in the Assembly's leading bodies and to participate in election observation missions. However, the Russian delegation remained members of the Assembly. The sanction applied throughout the remainder of the 2014 session and was renewed for a full year in January 2015, lapsing in January 2016. The sanction applied only to Russian parliamentarians in PACE, the Council of Europe's parliamentary body, and Russia continued to be a full member of the organisation as a whole.

In response, the Russian parliamentary delegation suspended its co-operation with PACE in June 2014, and in January 2016 – despite the lapsing of the sanctions – the Russian parliament decided not to submit its delegation's credentials for ratification, effectively leaving its seats empty. It did so again in January 2017, January 2018 and January 2019.

On 25 June 2019, after an eight-hour debate which ended in the small hours, the Assembly voted to change its rules, to make clear that its members should always have the right "to vote, to speak and to be represented", acceding to a key Russian demand and paving the way for the return of a Russian parliamentary delegation. Within hours the Russian parliament had presented the credentials of a new delegation, which – despite being challenged – were approved without any sanction by a vote of 116 in favour, 62 against and 15 abstentions. As a result, the Russian delegation which included Pyotr Olegovich Tolstoy as its head, returned to PACE with its full rights after a gap of five years. In response, the Ukrainian delegation protested before the Assembly, and announced Ukraine would leave the institution. Ukraine returned to PACE in January 2020.

=== Expulsion of Russia from the Council of Europe ===
On 25 February 2022 - the day after Russia's invasion of Ukraine on 24 February 2022 - Russia's membership in the Council of Europe was suspended by the Council of Europe's ministerial body, having consulted the Assembly earlier on the same day. Suspension does not have the same legal status as full expulsion.

On 15 March, following an all-day debate at an Extraordinary Session, the Parliamentary Assembly adopted a resolution calling on the Council of Europe's ministerial body to go further and to "immediately" expel Russia from the Council because of its aggression against Ukraine. It is the first time in its history that the Assembly has made such a call.

As the debate was drawing to a close, the Russian authorities submitted a formal letter announcing that it was withdrawing from the Council; however, as the expulsion procedure had already begun, this was no longer legally possible. The Assembly's debate continued and - in a unanimous vote of 216 in favour, 0 against and 3 abstentions - the Assembly called for Russia's full expulsion. The following day, 16 March, at an extraordinary meeting, the Committee of Ministers of the Council of Europe acceded to the Assembly's request, and decided that Russia should cease to be a member from that same day, after 26 years as a member state.

In the months since, the Assembly has on several occasions debated the consequences of Russia's aggression against Ukraine, including the legal consequences, and the practical support it can give to Ukraine. In October 2022, for example, it adopted a resolution declaring the Russian regime a "terrorist" one, while in January 2023 it unanimously demanded the setting up of an international criminal tribunal in The Hague to prosecute Russian and Belarusian political and military leaders who "planned, prepared, initiated or executed" the war. In June 2023, as the International Olympic Committee signalled it was considering allowing Russian and Belarusian athletes to take part in the Paris 2024 Olympics as "neutral individuals", the Assembly urged the continuation of a total ban.

In 2025, a Platform for Dialogue with Russian Democratic Forces was formed, with Russian opposition members named in January 2026. The platform met in Strasbourg for its first session in January 2026.

== Controversies ==
=== Corruption scandals ===
The European Parliament has had criticism over its prodigality and for being too complacent with conflicts of interest. Its refusal to become full member of the GRECO like all its member states is also a matter of criticism. In 2013, The New York Times reported that "some council members, notably Central Asian states and Russia, have tried to influence the organisation's parliamentary assembly with lavish gifts and trips". According to the report, said member states also hire lobbyists to fend off criticism of their human rights records.

PACE members have been implicated in corruption scandals relating to the Qatari and Azerbaijani governments. Qatargate is an ongoing scandal, involving allegations that PACE officials, lobbyists and their families have been influenced by the governments of Qatar, Morocco and Mauritania, engaging in corruption, money laundering, and organized crime.

Multiple PACE officials have been implicated in a money-laundering scheme organized by the Azerbaijani government. In exchange for (A) whitewashing Azerbaijan's poor human rights record and (B) lobbying for Azerbaijan in the Nagorno-Karabakh conflict, European politicians were paid off and received lavish gifts and paid trips. In 2018, an independent investigation found "strong suspicions of corruptive conduct involving members of the Assembly" and named a multiple members as having breached the Assembly's Code of Conduct. Following a series of hearings, it sanctioned many of the members or former members mentioned in the Investigative Body's report, either by depriving them of certain rights, or by excluding them from the Assembly's premises for life. Following the flight of Nagorno-Karabakh Armenians in 2023, PACE adopted a motion which stated that "it regrets the fact that Members of the European Parliament have accepted and failed to declare trips to Azerbaijan, visits to the Nagorno-Karabakh region and luxury hotel stays that were organised and paid for by Azerbaijani officials."

=== Resolution on children's right to physical integrity ===
In October 2013, following a motion by the Committee on Social Affairs, Health and Sustainable Development a year prior, the Assembly passed a resolution and an accompanying recommendation on children's right to physical integrity. These documents argued that while PACE had addressed forms of child abuse such as sexual violence and domestic violence, it was also necessary to address what they called "non-medically justified violations of children's physical integrity which may have a long-lasting impact on their lives". They called for a ban on the most harmful practices, such as female genital mutilation, while also calling for increased dialogue on other procedures they viewed as harmful, such as infant male circumcision, intersex medical interventions, and body piercings.

While none of the above documents called for an outright ban on male circumcision, they did call for the procedure to be regulated and debated, and an accompanying report referred to the practice as a "human rights violation". This condemnation received criticism from religious groups and figures, such as Shimon Peres, the president of Israel at the time, as well as the Anti-Defamation League, which argued that circumcision was an accepted medical procedure and that the resolution interfered with religious freedom and was anti-Semitic. In response to these criticisms, Liliane Maury Pasquier of the Committee on Social Affairs, Health and Sustainable Development wrote an op-ed in The Washington Post arguing that medical evidence against circumcision was presented in the Assembly's hearings and that the child's right to physical integrity overrode the parents' right to religious freedom. This op-ed was further criticized by the Anti-Defamation League.

In 2015, PACE passed a resolution on religious freedom and tolerance that referenced its previous resolution on circumcision and reiterated its view that the procedure should only be performed under appropriate medical conditions. Though some outlets reported that PACE had retracted its anti-circumcision stance, PACE clarified that it had neither cancelled nor replaced the old resolution and that they had never called for infant circumcision to be banned in the first place.

=== Cultural divisions ===
Although the Council of Europe is a human rights watchdog and a guardian against discrimination, it is widely regarded as becoming increasingly divided on moral issues because its membership includes mainly Muslim countries (Turkey and Azerbaijan) as well as Eastern European countries, among them Russia, where social conservatism is strong. In 2007, this became evident when the Parliamentary Assembly voted on a report compiled by Anne Brasseur of the Alliance of Liberals and Democrats for Europe Party on the rise of Christian creationism, bolstered by right-wing and populist parties in Eastern Europe.

== Historic speeches ==
In 2018, an online archive of all speeches made to the Parliamentary Assembly by heads of state or government since its creation in 1949 appeared on the Assembly's website, the fruit of the two-year project entitled "Voices of Europe". At the time of its launch, the archive comprised 263 speeches delivered over a 70-year period by some 216 Presidents, Prime Ministers, monarchs and religious leaders from 45 countries, but it continues to expand, as new speeches are added every few months.

Some very early speeches by individuals considered to be "founding figures" of the European institutions, even if they were not heads of state or government at the time, are also included (such as those by Winston Churchill and Robert Schuman). Addresses by eight monarchs appear in the list (such as King Juan Carlos I of Spain, King Albert II of Belgium and Grand Duke Henri of Luxembourg) as well as the speeches given by religious figures (such as Pope John Paul II) and several leaders from countries in the Middle East and North Africa (such as Shimon Peres, Yasser Arafat, Hosni Mubarak, Léopold Sédar Senghor or King Hussein of Jordan).

The full text of the speeches is given in both English and French, regardless of the original language used. The archive is searchable by country, by name, and chronologically.

== Languages ==
The official languages of the Council of Europe are English and French, but the Assembly also uses German and Italian as working languages. Each parliamentarian has separate earphones and a desk on which they are able to select the language which they would like to listen to. When foreign guests wish to address the Assembly in languages other than its working languages, they are invited to bring their own interpreters.

== Participants ==
The Assembly has a total of 612 members in total – 306 principal members and 306 substitutes – who are appointed or elected by the parliaments of each member state. Delegations must reflect the balance in the national parliament, so contain members of both ruling parties and oppositions. The population of each country determines its number of representatives and number of votes. This is in contrast to the Committee of Ministers, the Council of Europe's executive body, where each country has one vote. While not full members, the parliaments of Kyrgyzstan, Jordan, Morocco and Palestine hold "Partner for Democracy" status with the Assembly – which allows their delegations to take part in the Assembly's work, but without the right to vote – and there are also observer delegates from the Canadian, Israeli and Mexican parliaments.

The costs of participation in the Assembly – mainly travel and accommodation expenses – are borne by the national parliament of the delegation concerned. The few members who are appointed as rapporteurs, when they are carrying out work for the Assembly, have their costs covered by the Council of Europe.

Some notable former members of PACE include:

- former heads of state or government such as Britain's wartime leader Sir Winston Churchill, former German Chancellor Helmut Kohl, former Italian Prime Minister Silvio Berlusconi, former Turkish President Abdullah Gül, former Cypriot President Glafcos Clerides, former Finnish President Tarja Halonen, former Georgian President Mikhail Saakashvili, former Albanian President Sali Berisha, and many others.
- Dick Marty (Switzerland), appointed in late 2005 as rapporteur to investigate the CIA extraordinary renditions scandal and organ theft in Kosovo by the Kosovo Liberation Army from the Kosovo war, in 1998–2001
- A number of leading British political personalities, including former Deputy Prime Minister John Prescott, former Liberal Democrat leader Charles Kennedy, former Labour leader Jeremy Corbyn, and former Scottish First Minister Alex Salmond.
- Marcello Dell'Utri (Italy), convicted for complicity in conspiracy with the Mafia (Italian: concorso in associazione mafiosa), a crime for which he was found guilty on appeal and sentenced to 7 years in 2010.
- the Scottish soldier, adventurer, writer and MP Sir Fitzroy Maclean (United Kingdom), author of the autobiographical memoir and travelogue Eastern Approaches, who was a member of PACE on two separate occasions, in 1951–1952 and 1972–1973.

=== Composition by parliamentary delegation ===
Delegation	Seats	Accession
Albania	4	1995
Andorra	2	1994
Armenia	4	2001
Austria	6	1956
Azerbaijan	6	2001
Belgium	7	1949
Bosnia and Herzegovina	5	2002
Bulgaria	6	1992
Croatia	5	1996
Cyprus	3	1961–1964, 1984
Czech Republic	7	1991 (Note: Previously part of Czechoslovakia, 1991–1993.)
Denmark	5	1949
Estonia	3	1993
Finland	5	1989
France	18	1949
Germany	18	1951
Greece	7	1949–1969, 1974 (Note: Due to the Greek Case.)
Hungary	7	1990
Iceland	3	1959
(Republic of Ireland) Ireland	4	1949
Italy	18	1949
Latvia	3	1995
Liechtenstein	2	1978
Lithuania	4	1993
Luxembourg	3	1949
Malta	3	1965
Moldova	5	1995
Monaco	2	2004
Montenegro	3	2007 (Note: As part of Serbia and Montenegro, until 2003.)
Netherlands	7	1949
North Macedonia	3	1995
Norway	5	1949
Poland	12	1991
Portugal	7	1976
Romania	10	1993
San Marino	2	1988
Serbia	7	2003
Slovakia	5	1993 (Note: Previously part of Czechoslovakia, 1991–1993.)
Slovenia	3	1993
Spain	12	1977
Sweden	6	1949
Switzerland	6	1963
Turkey	18	1949
Ukraine	12	1995
United Kingdom	18	1949

=== Notes ===
The special guest status of the National Assembly of Belarus was suspended on 13 January 1997.

The Russian Federation ceased to be a member of the Council of Europe on 16 March 2022.

In January 2024, the Parliamentary Assembly of the Council of Europe resolved to not ratify the credentials of the Azerbaijani delegation, thereby preventing the Azerbaijani delegates from participating in the work of the Assembly.

On 30 January 2025, Georgia's delegation to the Parliamentary Assembly of the Council of Europe has announced the immediate cessation of its participation in the assembly, after the plenary voted to impose strict conditions for the ratification of the delegation's credentials.

=== Parliaments with Partner for Democracy status ===
Parliaments with Partner for Democracy status, pledge to work towards certain basic values of the Council of Europe, and agree to occasional assessments of their progress. In return, they are able to send delegations to take part in the work of the Assembly and its committees, but without the right to vote.

Delegation	Seats	Population	Population per member	Year Partner for Democracy status granted
Jordan	3	10,954,200	3,651,400	2016
Kyrgyzstan	3	6,586,600	1,097,767	2014
Morocco	6	36,261,700	6,043,617	2011
Palestine	3	5,227,193	1,742,398	2011

=== Parliaments with observer status ===
Delegation	Seats	Population	Population per member	Year observer status granted
Canada	6	35,151,728	5,858,621	1996
Israel	3	9,350,580	3,116,860	1957
Mexico	6	126,014,024	21,002,337	1999

=== Other delegations ===
The Assembly of Kosovo has been invited to designate a delegation to take part in the work of the Assembly and its committees as observers without the right to vote. On 24 April 2023, the Committee of Ministers of the Council of Europe approved Kosovo's application for membership, allowing the application to progress to the Parliamentary Assembly. On 16 April 2024, the Parliamentary Assembly voted in favour of Kosovo's membership, with 131 votes in favour, 29 against, and 11 abstentions.

Delegation	Seats	Population	Population per member	Year invited
Kosovo	3	1,806,279	602,093	2016

=== Invited representatives ===
Two representatives of the Turkish Cypriot community have been invited to participate in the deliberations of the assembly as observers without the right to vote.

Participants	Seats	Population	Population per member	Year invited
(Northern Cyprus) Turkish Cypriot Community	2	382,836	191,418	2004

=== Composition by political group ===
The Assembly has six political groups.

Graph of the party split among 575 seats.
Group	Chairman	Seats
Socialists, Democrats and Greens Group (SOC)	Frank Schwabe (Germany)	159 / 575
Group of the European People's Party (EPP/CD)	Pablo Hispán (Spain)	136 / 575
European Conservatives, Patriots & Affiliates (ECPA)	Zsolt Németh (Hungary)	115 / 575
Alliance of Liberals and Democrats for Europe (ALDE)	Iulian Bulai (Romania)	86 / 575
Group of the Unified European Left (UEL)	Laura Castel (Spain); Andrej Hunko (Germany)	37 / 575
Members not belonging to a Political Group (NR)		42 / 575

== Presidents ==
The Presidents of the Parliamentary Assembly of the Council of Europe have been:

Period	Name	Country	Political affiliation
1949	Édouard Herriot (interim)	France	Radical Party
1949–1951	Paul-Henri Spaak	Belgium	Socialist Party
1952–1954	François de Menthon	France	Popular Republican Movement
1954–1956	Guy Mollet	France	Socialist Party
1956–1959	Fernand Dehousse	Belgium	Socialist Party
1959	John Edwards	United Kingdom	Labour Party
1960–1963	Per Federspiel	Denmark	Venstre
1963–1966	Pierre Pflimlin	France	Popular Republican Movement
1966–1969	Geoffrey de Freitas	United Kingdom	Labour Party
1969–1972	Olivier Reverdin	Switzerland	Liberal Party
1972–1975	Giuseppe Vedovato	Italy	Christian Democracy
1975–1978	Karl Czernetz	Austria	Social Democratic Party
1978–1981	Hans de Koster	Netherlands	People's Party for Freedom and Democracy
1981–1982	José María de Areilza	Spain	Union of the Democratic Centre
1983–1986	Karl Ahrens	Germany	Social Democratic Party
1986–1989	Louis Jung	France	Group of the European People's Party
1989–1992	Anders Björck	Sweden	European Democratic Group
1992	Geoffrey Finsberg	United Kingdom	European Democratic Group
1992–1995	Miguel Ángel Martínez Martínez	Spain	Socialist Group
1996–1999	Leni Fischer	Germany	Group of the European People's Party
1999–2002	Russell Johnston	United Kingdom	Alliance of Liberals and Democrats for Europe
2002–2004	Peter Schieder	Austria	Socialist Group
2005–2008	René van der Linden	Netherlands	Group of the European People's Party
2008–2010	Lluís Maria de Puig	Spain	Socialist Group
2010–2012	Mevlüt Çavuşoğlu	Turkey	European Democratic Group
2012–2014	Jean-Claude Mignon	France	Group of the European People's Party
2014–2016	Anne Brasseur	Luxembourg	Alliance of Liberals and Democrats for Europe
2016–2017	Pedro Agramunt	Spain	Group of the European People's Party
2017–2018	Stella Kyriakides	Cyprus	Group of the European People's Party
2018	Michele Nicoletti	Italy	Socialists, Democrats and Greens Group
2018–2020	Liliane Maury Pasquier	Switzerland	Socialists, Democrats and Greens Group
2020–2022	Rik Daems	Belgium	Alliance of Liberals and Democrats for Europe
2022–2024	Tiny Kox	Netherlands	Group of the Unified European Left
2024–present	Theodoros Roussopoulos	Greece	Group of the European People's Party

=== Vice-Presidents ===
Nineteen vice-presidents are elected annually at the beginning of an ordinary session and remain in office until the next session.

Period	Name	Country	Political affiliation
2025–present
2025–present	Don Touhig	United Kingdom	Socialists, Democrats and Greens Group
2025–present	Miroslava Němcová	Czech Republic	European Conservatives, Patriots & Affiliates
2025–present	Yıldırım Tuğrul Türkeş	Turkey	Member not belonging to a Political Group
2025–present	Elisabetta Gardini	Italy	European Conservatives, Patriots & Affiliates
2025–present	Armin Laschet	Germany	Group of the European People's Party
2025–present	Antonio Gutiérrez Limones	Spain	Socialists, Democrats and Greens Group
2025–present	Andries Gryffroy	Belgium	Alliance of Liberals and Democrats for Europe
2025–present	Mogens Jensen	Denmark	Socialists, Democrats and Greens Group
2025–present	Bernadeta Coma	Andorra	Alliance of Liberals and Democrats for Europe
2025–present	Bertrand Bouyx	France	Alliance of Liberals and Democrats for Europe
2025–present	Miapetra Kumpula-Natri	Finland	Socialists, Democrats and Greens Group
2025–present	Marko Pavić	Croatia	Group of the European People's Party
2025–present	Agnieszka Pomaska	Poland	Group of the European People's Party
2025–present	Blerina Gjylameti	Albania	Socialists, Democrats and Greens Group
2025–present	Arusyak Julhakyan	Armenia	Group of the European People's Party
2025–present	Nicos Tornaritis	Cyprus	Group of the European People's Party
2025–present	Denitsa Sacheva	Bulgaria	Group of the European People's Party
2025–present	Knut Abraham	Germany	Group of the European People's Party
	vacant	Bosnia and Herzegovina	

=== Secretary General ===
In January 2021, the Assembly elected Despina Chatzivassiliou-Tsovilis as Secretary General of the Assembly, serving a five-year term beginning in March 2021.

She heads an 80-strong multi-national secretariat based in Strasbourg, and is the first woman to hold the post since the Assembly's creation in 1949, as well as the first person of Greek nationality.

== See also ==
- European Cultural Convention
- Václav Havel Human Rights Prize
