= Alsace–Lorraine Soviet Republic =

Short-lived revolutionary republic

Alsace-Lorraine Soviet Republic Räterepublik Elsaß-Lothringen (German) République Soviétique d'Alsace-Lorraine (French)
- 1918
- Flag
- Anthem: "L'Internationale"
- Capital: Strasbourg
- Common languages: German; French; Alsatian; Lorraine Franconian
- Government: Soviet republic
- History
  - Republic proclaimed: 10 November 1918
  - Occupied by France: 22 November 1918
Preceded by	Succeeded by
German Empire; Alsace–Lorraine	French Third Republic

The Alsace-Lorraine Soviet Republic (German: Räterepublik Elsaß-Lothringen, French: République Soviétique d'Alsace-Lorraine) was a short-lived revolutionary government established in November 1918 during the closing days of World War I. It emerged during the November Revolution in Germany, a period of widespread political upheaval and social unrest across Central Europe. The movement in Alsace–Lorraine was part of a wave of workers’ and soldiers’ councils that wanted to assert local control as imperial authority collapsed. Its establishment coincided with the transfer of the region from German to French sovereignty.

== Background ==
In autumn 1918, despite the prospect of imminent defeat, the Imperial German Navy ordered a final attack on the Royal Navy. On 30 October, this sparked a mutiny aboard two ships in Kiel. The arrest of the mutineers prompted sailors’ demonstrations, supported by local workers who formed workers' and soldiers' councils, or "soviets." A general strike was called on 5 November, and revolutionary councils soon spread across the German Empire, even reaching army units in occupied territories, such as in Bucharest, where Count Andlau-Hombourg led a Council of Alsatians-Lorrainers within General von Mackensen’s army group.

By 7 November, monarchic authority collapsed in Germany’s federal states. On 9 November, the revolution reached Berlin, forcing Emperor Wilhelm II to abdicate and the Republic of Germany to be proclaimed. That day, councils also formed in Alsace-Lorraine, driven by revolutionary sailors from Kiel and Wilhelmshaven, creating workers' and soldiers' councils, sometimes jointly, particularly amid strikes in Moselle Lorraine.

On 8 November, sailors reached Metz by train through Osnabrück and Cologne. Roughly fifty Bavarian troops were already stationed in the barracks, their rifles marked with red cloths in response to the fall of the Bavarian monarchy. The rebels released soldiers held in the city’s military prisons and advanced to the town hall, where they hoisted a makeshift red flag fashioned from an Ottoman banner, its crescent and star covered with red lead paint.

Local social-democratic trade unionists soon organized a revolutionary council headed by Hans-Heinrich Voortmann, a socialist locksmith and non-commissioned officer from Strasbourg. General Arnold Lequis, the city’s military governor, accepted the council’s authority, and the German civil administration quickly fell apart as district president Karl von Gemmingen-Hornberg was pushed aside. Mayor Roger Forêt and the municipal authorities chose to work with the new council, issuing a joint appeal for order on 9 November. Aside from limited looting and some officers being stripped of their military ranks, disturbances were minimal, and statues of the House of Hohenzollern and other monarchic symbols were left undisturbed.

Workers' and soldiers' councils also emerged on the same day in Algrange, Hombourg, Saint-Avold, Forbach, Sarrebourg, Montigny-lès-Metz, Sarreguemines, and Stiring-Wendel. The revolutionary wave also reached Hagondange, Hayange, Petite-Rosselle, Rombas, Sarralbe, Knutange, and Thionville.

== Proclamation of the Soviet Republic in Strasbourg ==
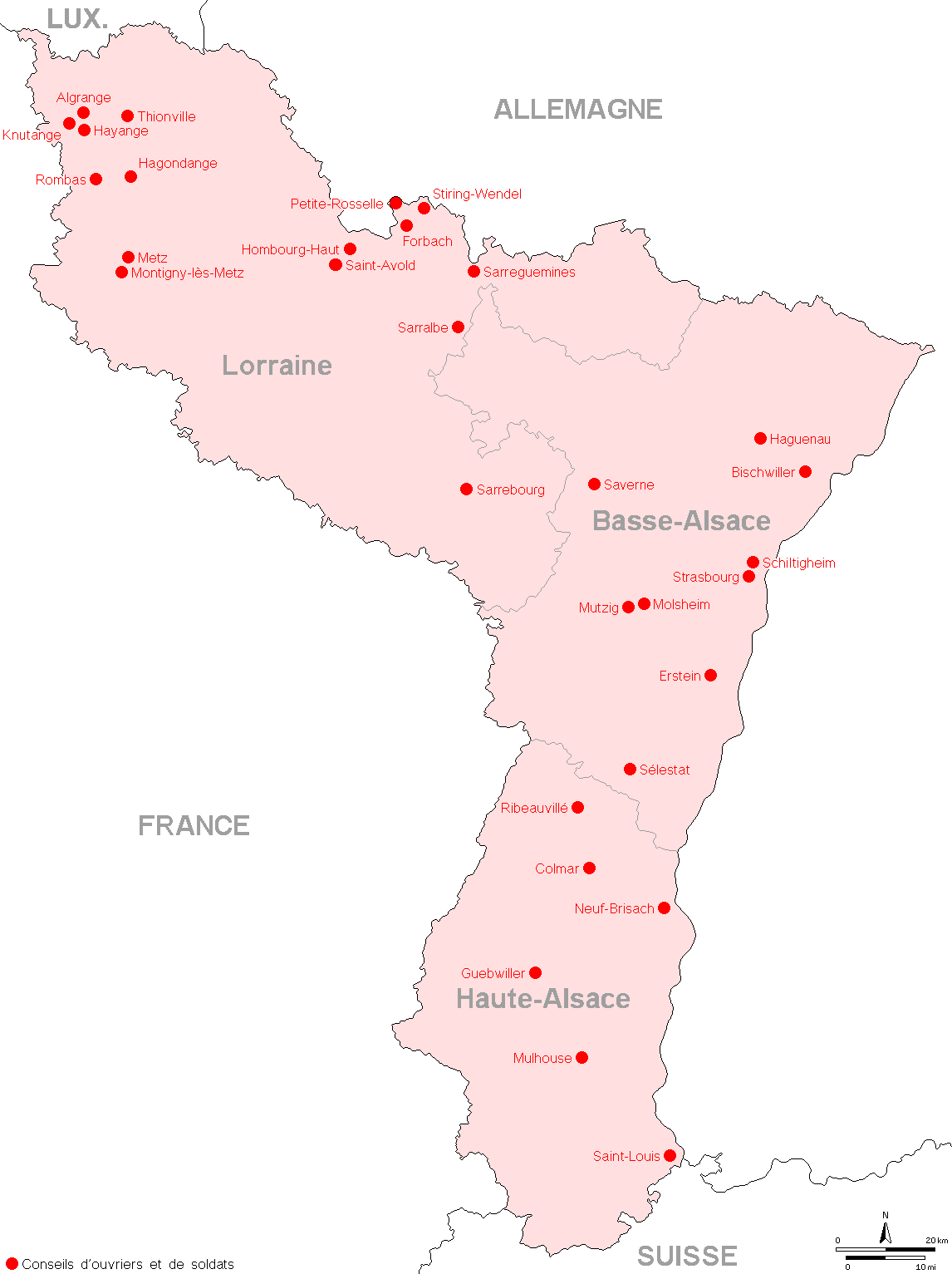
Workers' and Soldiers Councils in Alsace-Lorraine in 1918

In Strasbourg, the arrival of revolutionary sailors was announced by telegram on the morning of 9 November. A group of mutineers from the Baltic reached the city via Wissembourg that day, while another was delayed at the Kehl bridge. That night, a soldiers’ council formed at Strasbourg train station. Simultaneously, a movement arose among military government workers, led by Johannes Rebholz. A revolutionary council was set up by Bernard Böhle, a Social Democratic MP from Strasbourg, with the support of Lieutenant-Colonel von Holleben, the chief of staff of the military government.

The uprising quickly spread across Alsace. In Haguenau, sailors from Wissembourg formed a soldiers’ council on the evening of 9 November, while Colmar and Mulhouse followed that night or the next morning, supported by local workers. On 10 November, soldiers in Saverne’s barracks refused orders and established a council. In Sélestat, revolutionaries wore red armbands to signify that they were revolutionaries, and in Guebwiller, a demonstration led by a red flag and trade union leaders preceded the council’s election. Soldiers from Bergholtz, Issenheim, and Soultz also participated. Within two days, Alsace was covered by a network of workers’ and soldiers’ councils, as troops returned home under ordinary soldiers’ leadership, carrying red flags, wearing red cockades, and marching past unarmed, rankless officers. The train carried the revolution from one barracks to another throughout Alsace.

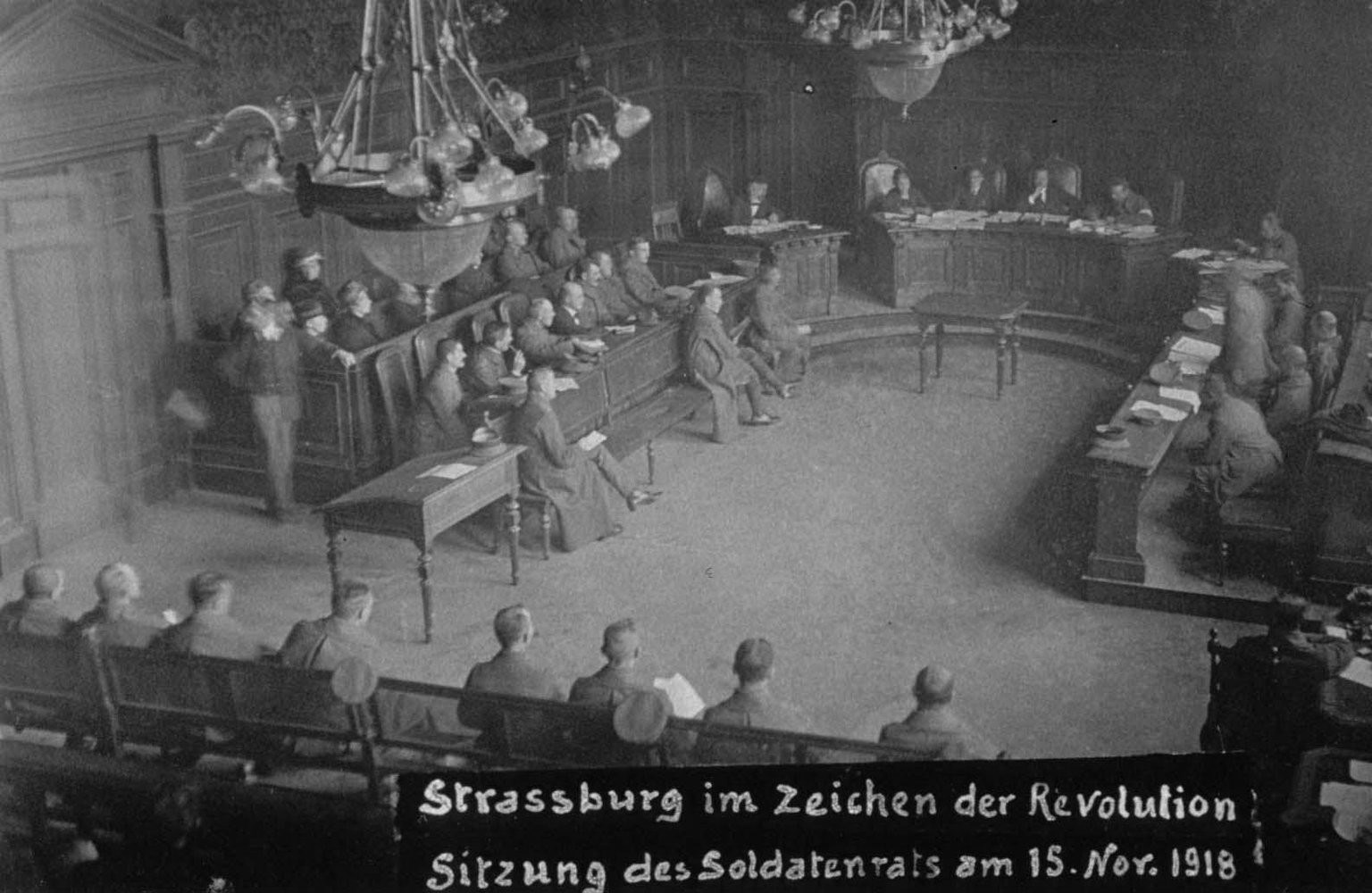
The soldiers' council meeting in what is now the Assize Court chamber of the Strasbourg Palais de Justice on 15 November 1918

Revolutionary councils also appeared in Bischwiller, Erstein, Molsheim, Mutzig, Neuf-Brisach, Ribeauvillé, Saint-Louis, and Schiltigheim. The councils' primary aim was to maintain order and prevent looting. In total, the region saw the creation of thirty-one revolutionary councils: fifteen in Alsace, and sixteen in Lorraine.

== National Council of Alsace-Lorraine ==
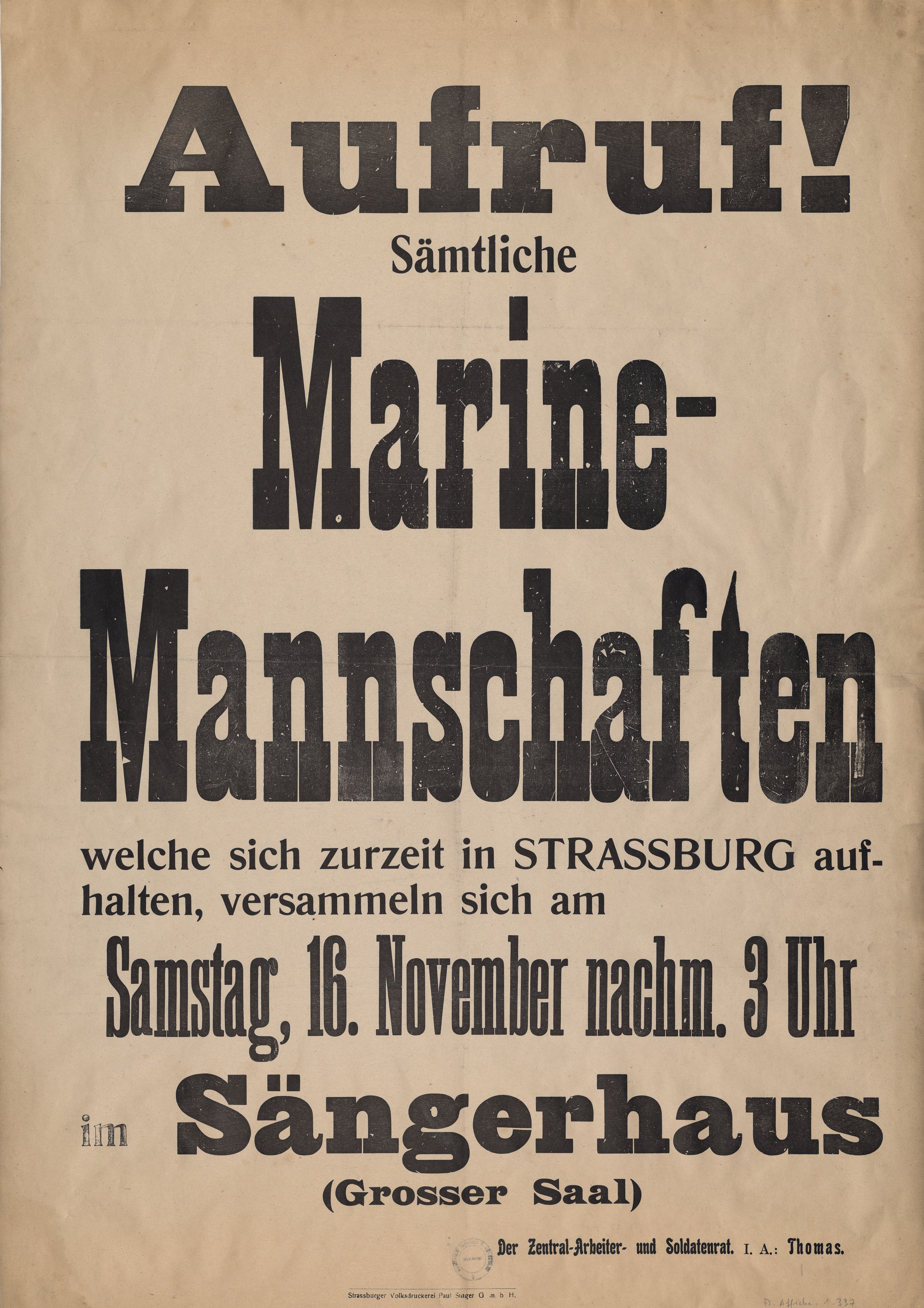
A Strasbourg poster calling on sailors to rise up

Within the councils, German nationalist positions were prominent, defended by officers, soldiers from across Germany, and some activists from the MSPD, USPD, or even communist circles. In Strasbourg, MSPD deputy Jacques Peirotes declared himself mayor on the night of 9–10 November, aiming to stop revolutionary influence and restore bourgeois authority. The next morning, the municipal council confirmed him. To balance the soldiers’ council, Laurent Meyer, president of the Woodworkers’ Union, formed a workers’ council with Charles Riehl and Gustave Schulenburg. Workers’ councils soon appeared in Colmar, Mulhouse, and Schiltigheim.

On 10 November, Strasbourg’s town hall was occupied, and crowds gathered at Place Kléber as the soldiers’ council met. Johannes Rebholz, head of the council, declared that power now belonged to the proletariat. Peirotes rushed to the Kléber statue and proclaimed a "social republic," likely alluding to France, reflecting his Francophile stance and desire for Alsace-Lorraine’s return to France.

By midday, Peirotes, Meyer, and Rebholz jointly called for calm, urging citizens to follow council orders and establishing a civic guard. They convened delegates to elect a thirteen-member executive committee, including moderates like Rebholz and radical figures such as Captain Erik Reinartz. The committee prioritized free speech and the release of political prisoners, occupying all official buildings, including the regional ministries at Kaiserplatz. By evening, Strasbourg had two centers of power: the executive committee of councils and the bourgeois municipal council. A civic guard, led by magistrate-turned-police chief Jules Lévy, was created to counter armed extremist groups loyal to Reinartz.

On 9 November, following Emperor Wilhelm II’s abdication, around ten Alsace-Lorraine Landtag deputies, led by Auguste Labroise, moved to transform the assembly into a sovereign "National Council." They convened the Second Chamber early, backed by local notables and most of the population. Parallel to the Landtag’s move, a soldiers’ council attempted to proclaim a republic similar to Berlin’s Räterepublik, but MSPD forces blocked it.

The Landtag convened on 11 November at the Palace of the Diet. Inspired by national councils in Czechoslovakia, Poland, and Bukovina following the collapse of Austria-Hungary, deputies declared the "National Council of Alsace-Lorraine" under Eugène Ricklin. Claiming sovereignty, it operated alongside Strasbourg’s municipal council and the workers’ and soldiers’ council. The council was recognized by Berlin’s Council of People’s Deputies and congratulated by Reichskanzler Friedrich Ebert. MSPD members Eugène Imbs and Laurent Meyer maintained links between the new council and the revolutionary councils.

After Schwander and the Hauss government resigned, an administrative commission was formed to manage daily affairs, keeping civil servants in place, organizing supplies, aiding returning refugees, demobilizing soldiers, and it negotiated a swift end to the railway workers' strike. However, the councils remained a powerful force. The National Council, planning to declare Alsace-Lorraine’s annexation to France on 13 November, delayed the move due to threats from Captain Reinartz.

== End of the Soviet Republic ==
=== Arrival of French Forces ===
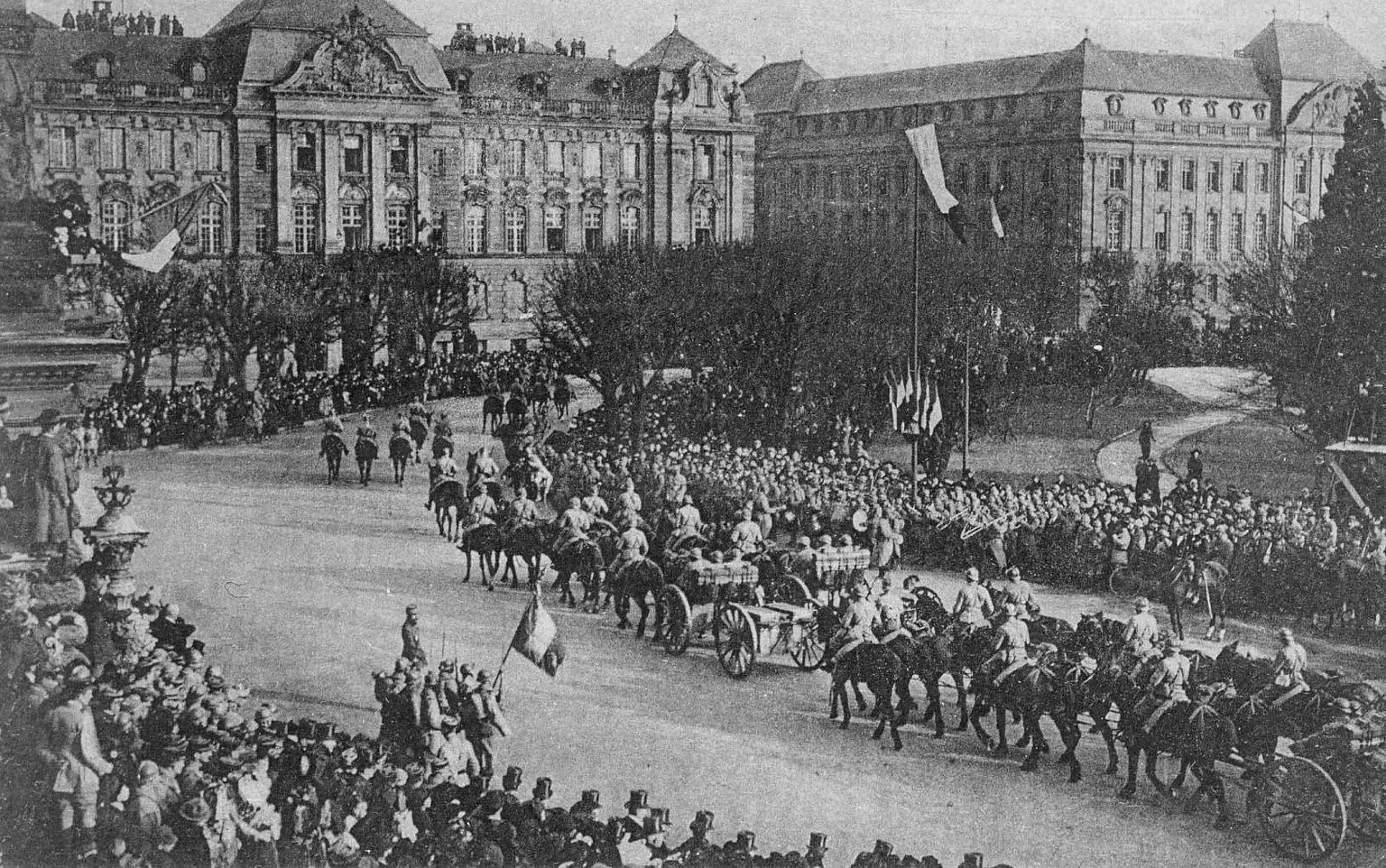
Parade of the French 4th Army on Place de la République in Strasbourg on 22 November 1918

Throughout Alsace-Lorraine, the workers’ and soldiers’ councils disbanded on their own as German troops withdrew between 11 and 17 November 1918, in line with the Armistice of 11 November 1918. The Strasbourg executive committee remained in session until 20 November, when the red flag was taken down from the cathedral at the request of MSPD deputy Jacques Peirotes.

Several days passed between the armistice and the arrival of French troops across Alsace-Lorraine. The Entente armies crossed the former front quickly, advancing faster than expected due to fears of revolutionary contagion. French Eberhard von Mackensen's soldiers entered the towns between 17 and 22 November 1918. In Moselle, the advance of the troops commanded by General Émile Fayolle was slowed by the gradual retreat of the German army, and on 20 November reached the line between Völklingen, Saarbrücken and Sarreguemines. In Metz, Francophile locals formed a welcoming committee for the troops. The workers' and soldiers' council voluntarily stood down upon the arrival of the French on 22 November.

The troops were welcomed enthusiastically by the pro-French population, which had prepared for their arrival. The celebrations were partly spontaneous and partly organized, but they were not shared by everyone, as many residents remained pro-German or supported neutrality for Alsace-Lorraine. On 5 December, the MSPD-led National Council of Alsace-Lorraine unanimously voted in favor of union with France. Soon after, President Raymond Poincaré and Council President Georges Clemenceau visited the region from 8 to 10 December to oversee the reintegration of the "lost provinces," while deliberately refusing to meet the National Council’s leaders. From the balcony of Strasbourg’s town hall, Poincaré addressed an enthusiastic crowd, declaring, "The plebiscite is done!", thereby avoiding a referendum with an uncertain outcome.

== See also ==
- November 1918 insurgency in Alsace–Lorraine
- Mainz Workers' and Soldiers' Council
- Bavarian Soviet Republic
- Bremen Soviet Republic
- Würzburg Soviet Republic

== Sources ==
- Troester, J.: 22 novembre 1918 : les Français à Strasbourg, in La Grande Guerre Magazine 38, April 2003.
- Eschbach, J.: Au Coeur de la Resistance Alsacienne. Le Combat de Paul Dingler, Bentzinger, 2005. ISBN 2-84629-068-7.
- Musée historique de Strasbourg
- Döblin, A.: Bourgeois & soldats (Novembre 1918), novel, ISBN 2-87653-046-5. In French. Part I of a tetralogy; the whole four books are available in German, ISBN 3-423-59030-0.
