= November 1918 insurgency in Alsace-Lorraine =

German communist revolutionary movement in Alsace-Lorraine

The November 1918 insurgency in Alsace-Lorraine was an uprising from 8 November to 22 November 1918 started by returning German soldiers, local workers, and sailors following the First World War. It was inspired by the German revolution of 1918–1919 and saw the emergence of communist workers' and soldiers' councils in many cities of Alsace-Lorraine.

The workers' and soldiers' councils dissolved themselves in the face of French troops advancing towards cities evacuated by the German authorities following the signing of the Armistice on 11 November 1918. The entry of General Henri Gouraud's 4th Army into Strasbourg on 22 November brought an end to the uprisings in the region, which was then reintegrated into France. Unlike the revolutions in the Bavarian Soviet Republic, the Hungarian Soviet Republic, and Czechoslovakia, this revolutionary episode did not lead to the creation of a soviet republic.

During its brief existence the insurgency helped facilitate a political transition between the collapse of the German Empire and the establishment of French administration in the departments of Moselle, Bas-Rhin, and Haut-Rhin.

== Background ==
Following the Franco-Prussian War of 1870 to 1871, the territories that France ceded to the German Empire under the terms of the Treaty of Frankfurt of 10 May 1871 formed the "Imperial Territory of Alsace-Lorraine" (German: Reichsland Elsaß-Lothringen). Although the territory was considered the common property of the twenty-five states making up the German federal state, in practice Alsace-Lorraine was directly under the authority of the imperial crown and enjoyed a special status within the empire. It was governed by the federal authority, which was represented in the Reichsland (imperial territory) of Alsace-Lorraine by a senior officer based in the capital Strasbourg, initially called the Oberpräsident (chief president), and later the Statthalter (governor).

Constituencies and elected members after the state election in Alsace-Lorraine in 1911.

The German Constitution was applied to Alsace-Lorraine from 1874, resulting in the Reichsland being represented by deputies in the Reichstag, the lower chamber of the federal parliament in Berlin, with laws concerning the Reichsland voted on by the Bundesrat, the upper chamber of the federal parliament. The territory was divided into three districts – Lorraine, Lower Alsace, and Upper Alsace – each with its own Bezirkstag (assembly), which appointed the regional delegation to Strasbourg, known as the Landesausschuss (state committee). When founded in 1874 the Landesausschuss initially had only an advisory role, but was granted legislative and financial powers in 1877, albeit under the supervision of the Bundesrat.

On 31 May 1911 the federal authorities granted a regional constitution to the Reichsland, which was thereafter considered a fully-fledged German state and granted greater autonomy. The Landesausschuss was replaced by an elected assembly – the Landtag (regional parliament) – which sat in the Alsace-Lorraine Diet Palace. Despite the existence of these representative bodies, real power in Alsace-Lorraine remained in the hands of the Imperial German Army, as demonstrated by the Saverne Affair in 1913.

== World War I ==
Diplomatic tensions in Europe during the summer of 1914 prompted German Emperor Wilhelm II to proclaim a "state of imminent war danger" (Kriegsgefahrzustand) on 31 July placing German civil power under the control of the military authorities. From 1 August – the day Germany entered World War I – individual liberties, press freedom, and the rights of assembly and association were suspended, with the state of siege declared across German territory marking the beginning of a military dictatorship driven by fear of treason.

In Alsace-Lorraine the German authorities banned French-language newspapers and imposed repressive measures, including purges, arrests, and deportations, with those suspected of sympathising with France interned in various fortresses throughout the German Empire. At the same time, over 380,000 Alsatians and Lorrainers were conscripted into the German army to fight against the Triple Entente – which included France – with a further 16,000 conscripted into the Imperial German Navy.

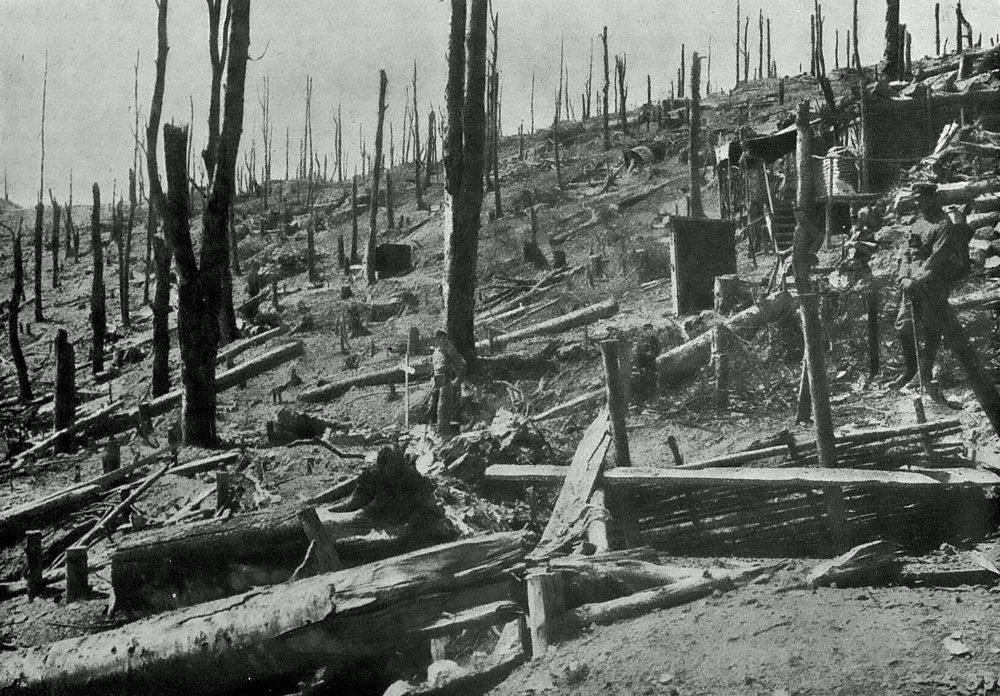
The slopes of the Hartmannswillerkopf in 1915.

France was driven by a spirit of revenge against Germany dating back to 1871 and a desire to reclaim the "lost provinces" of Alsace-Lorraine. The first French offensives of the war were launched in Upper Alsace and the Moselle region of Lorraine, aiming to quickly capture Mulhouse, Morhange, and Sarrebourg, but were all unsuccessful. While this Battle of the Frontiers ended in a German victory, the situation in the Vosges had stabilised by the end of 1914 as the war on this part of the Western Front became bogged down. Neither of the battles of Hartmannswillerkopf or Liège brought about any major changes to the regional front, despite the thousands of casualties on both sides.

As the war dragged on, disquiet spread amongst Alsatian soldiers. Spartacist propaganda was popular on the Western Front, particularly in early 1918, and some soldiers were members of the Independent Social Democratic Party of Germany (USPD), one of the first of the subsequent revolutionary movements. On 12 May 1918 there was an insurrection of Alsatian troops at Beverloo Camp.

== Possibility of autonomy ==
The political situation in Germany began to shift in autumn 1918 following the setbacks suffered by the German army in France and Belgium during the summer of that year. With an Entente victory appearing likely, the German government attempted to retain Alsace-Lorraine within the empire by granting it the status of a federated state, thereby giving it an autonomy similar to the twenty-five other German states. On 8 October 1918 the Mayor of Strasbourg, Rudolf Schwander, was summoned to Berlin and offered the post of Statthalter, subsequently taking office on 14 October. Karl Hauss, head of the Alsatian-Lorraine Centre Party parliamentary group in the Landtag, was appointed Staatssekretär (state secretary) on 19 October and tasked with forming a regional government.

By appointing both a Protestant and a Catholic in Schwander and Hauss, the German federal government had hoped to address religious sensitivities in the region. However, this move provoked the wrath of the president of the second chamber of the Landtag, Eugène Ricklin, nicknamed the "Lion of the Sundgau". On 23 October 1918 Ricklin addressed the Reichstag in Berlin to oppose the autonomy project, declaring it outdated and arguing that it was merely an attempt to transform Alsace-Lorraine into a federated state that would remain part of the German Empire. In his view, the future of the region was an international matter that needed to be decided at the forthcoming peace conference.

The staff of Army Group Albrecht von Württemberg had founded the Alsatian Bund in September 1918 as an association intended to promote German influence in Alsace against the aspirations of francophile Alsatians hoping for reunification with France. Now, after initially supporting the autonomy project, the Alsatian Bund began advocating for a neutral territory. On 6 November leaflets calling for the creation of a neutral free republic in Alsace-Lorraine were distributed in Colmar, Mulhouse, and Strasbourg, and neutralist posters championing the right to self-determination were put up in the streets of Mulhouse and Strasbourg.

This autonomy project ultimately failed due to the refusal of several Alsatian-Lorraine parties to join the government formed by Schwander and Hauss. From 1 November the two were left to manage only day-to-day affairs, with Hauss agreeing to this role on the condition that he would not be obliged to act in support of keeping Alsace-Lorraine within the empire. As the autonomy plan collapsed the German federal government shifted its strategy to promoting neutrality for Alsace-Lorraine as neither German nor French, invoking the principle of self-determination.

== Revolution across Germany ==
The surface ships of the Imperial German Navy had largely remained in port after the Battle of Jutland in 1916. But despite the prospect of Germany's imminent defeat, in October 1918 the command of the Imperial German Navy ordered the fleet to leave port for one final attack on the British Royal Navy. The announcement triggered a mutiny on 30 October 1918 aboard two German ships anchored in the port of Kiel, and the arrest of the mutineers led to demonstrations by sailors demanding the release of their comrades. The city's workers and trade unions supported them, forming workers' and soldiers' councils (Soldatenräte and Arbeiterräte), or both together (Soldaten und Arbeiterräte), sometimes in the context of revolutionary strikes.

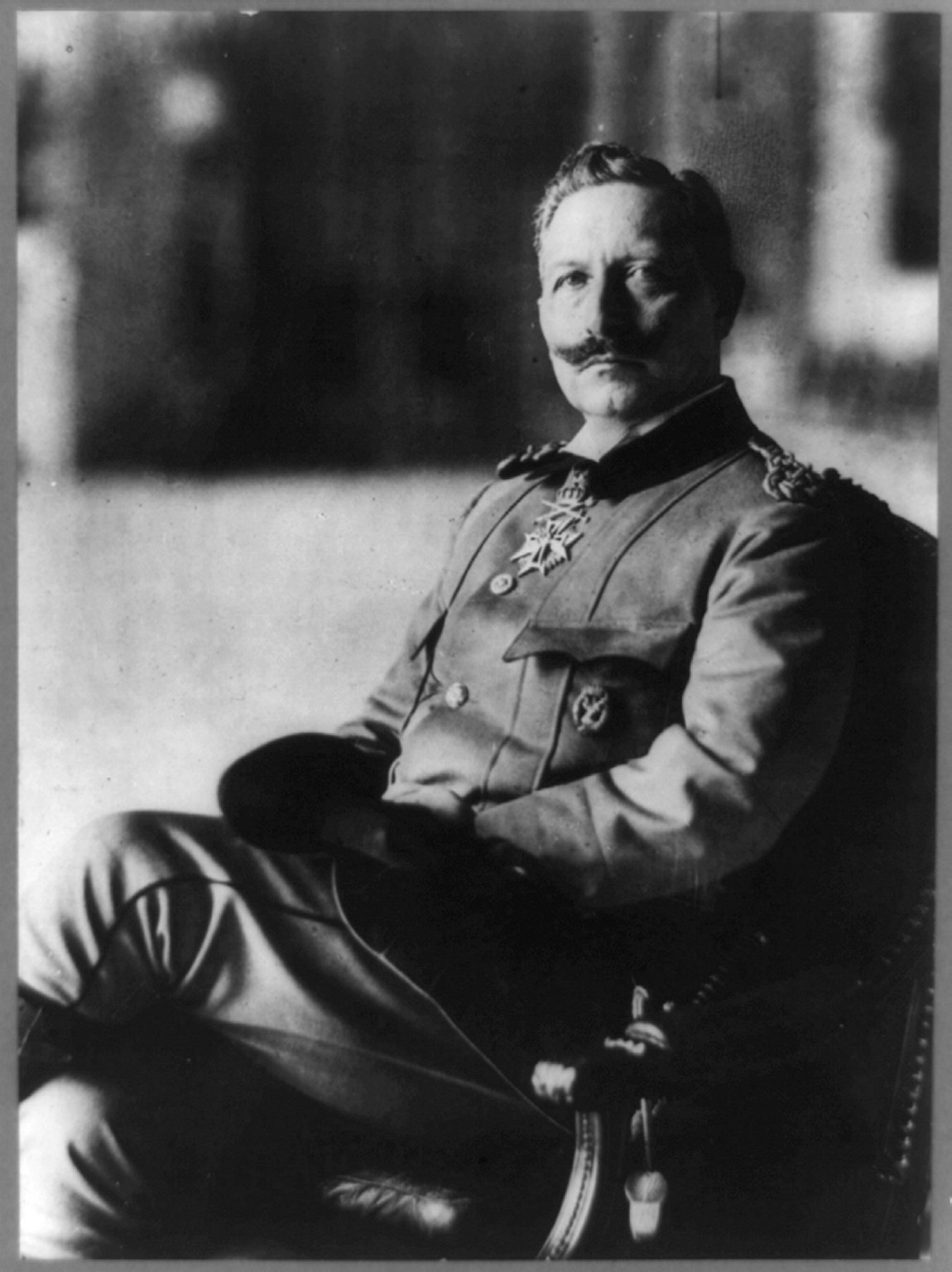
The German Emperor, Kaiser Wilhelm II

On 5 November a call for a general strike was launched and in the following days revolutionary councils imitating Russian soviets were established across the German Empire, with the wave of insurrection reaching Forbach, Hombourg, Saint-Avold, Sarrebourg, Sarreguemines, Algrange, Hagondange, Hayange, Knutange, Montigny-lès-Metz, Petite-Rosselle, Rombas, Sarralbe, Stiring-Wendel, Thionville, and even German army units stationed in occupied Allied territories. A number of the 15,000 Alsatians and Lorrainers drafted into the Imperial German Navy joined the insurrection and decided to rouse their homeland to revolt.

Under the Empire of 1871–1918 the German kaiser had been the sovereign of all the German Reichslands, but from 7 November monarchic power started to collapse across the federal states of Germany. When the revolution reached Berlin on 9 November Emperor Wilhelm II was forced to abdicate, marking the fall of the monarchy at both the national and regional level. In the consequent legal power vacuum the Republic of Germany was proclaimed and the Landtag declared itself the supreme authority of German lands, with the name of Nationalrat.

== Revolution in Strasbourg ==
The insurrection triggered by the Kiel mutiny took time to reach Alsace-Lorraine as the focus there was still on agitating for autonomy. Six members of the Alsatian Bund sent a telegram to US President Woodrow Wilson on 3 November, requesting that the right of peoples to self-determination be granted to Alsace-Lorraine. Father Sigwalt, the priest of Rountzenheim, campaigned for a neutral Republic of Alsace-Lorraine, and on 6 November published a rather clumsy article in Der Elsässer reminding readers that, "A Catholic people cannot accommodate an atheist state". It only served to alert Protestants that an independent Alsace-Lorraine risked being dominated by the rival faith.

The news of the proclamation of a Bavarian Soviet Republic reached Strasbourg on 8 November, and around fifty Bavarian soldiers in the barracks displayed red cloths on their rifles following this abolition of the Bavarian monarchy. A first group of mutineers from the Baltic Sea arrived that day via Wissembourg, and thousands of demonstrators rallied to acclaim them on the Place Kléber, the main square in Strasbourg. To cries of "Vive la France!" the statue of Kléber was draped in the flag of France, and the windows of the house where the emperor's last son resided were smashed. A train controlled by insurgents was blocked on the Kehl bridge and a loyal commander was ordered to shoot at the train. One insurgent was killed, but his fellows took control of Kehl.

During the night of 8 November the insurgent seamen established the Soldiers' Council of Strasbourg at Strasbourg train station, and took control of the city. Red flags flew all over, an amnesty was declared, and freedom of the press was proclaimed. Factory workers went on strike, demanding higher wages, and against the opposition of the factory owners the council raised wages by decree. All official buildings in Strasbourg were occupied, including the ministries of Alsace-Lorraine located on today's Place de la République, then still called Kaiserplatz. Official portraits of German sovereigns were taken down from the city's various administrative and judicial buildings, and at the Palais de Justice the bust of the German Emperor was replaced by one of Karl Marx.

Another revolutionary council was established among military government workers, led by Johannes Rebholz, a USPD member and the head of a brewers' union. Originally from Sigmaringen, he relocated to Strasbourg in 1910 where he worked as a brewer and became actively involved in trade union activities. In 1917, amid the political upheavals of WWI, he joined the USPD, aligning himself with many other revolutionary social democrats who opposed the war and the Majority Social Democratic Party of Germany (MSPD)'s support for it. To further complicate matters, a third council was set up by Bernard Böhle, a majority Social Democratic MP from Strasbourg, which was supported by Lieutenant-Colonel von Holleben, the chief of staff of the military government.

During the night of 9 to 10 November the pro-bourgeois MSPD deputy and city councillor Jacques Peirotes proclaimed himself mayor, filling the post left vacant by Rudolf Schwander. His goal was to restore the dictatorship of the bourgeoisie by lessening the grip of the mass revolutionary forces on the city and sabotaging the proletarian movements in Alsace-Lorraine, just as the MSPD was doing in other parts of Germany. The next morning the municipal council unanimously confirmed him in office. To counterbalance the influence of the soldiers' council, Laurent Meyer, president of the Woodworkers' Union and MSPD member elected to the Landtag, formed a workers' council with Charles Riehl, founder of the Strasbourg Consumers' Cooperative Society, and Gustave Schulenburg, head of the Metalworkers' Union.

On the morning of 10 November, Strasbourg's town hall was occupied and the soldiers' council convened. A crowd gathered on Place Kléber, and in front of the guard post at the Aubette the "Republic of Councils" was proclaimed. Johannes Rebholz, newly elected head of the soldiers' council declared that, "the old regime has been overthrown and the people have taken the government into their own hands", adding, "from now on, power lies in the hands of the proletariat". Rushing to the statue of General Kléber in the same square, Jacques Peirotes responded by also proclaiming a "social republic" but without further clarification. As a Francophile, the new mayor of Strasbourg may have been alluding to the French Republic without naming it outright. He had already publicly expressed his desire for Alsace-Lorraine to be returned to France and had asked the French generals to send in their troops to restore order.

With the proclaiming of the "Republic of Councils" there were now two governments in Strasbourg, insofar as the Schwander-Hauss team still held nominal authority and the various workers' and soldiers' councils springing up across Alsace-Lorraine could be considered a unified front, with two or more councils sometimes sharing the same city. To add to the confusion, a Professor Wurtz had planned to convene a committee at the Sängerhaus on 11 November to bring together prominent Alsace-Lorraine figures to seize power and proclaim independence. But the attempt failed. The Landtag – now transformed into the National Council after absorbing Alsace-Lorraine deputies from the Reichstag – overthrew Schwander and briefly replaced him with Eugène Ricklin until Canon Delsor took over. No one knew who governed anymore, especially once the Republic of Councils was proclaimed.

The proclamation seemed hardly serious to some Alsatian-Lorrainers. Spindler describes a soldier bursting into the Strasbourg hotel where he was staying on 10 November and ordering officers to remove their insignia: "It seemed so unserious that Mme Noth and I laughed about it". It was a Sunday, and he observed, "Most people were peacefully attending church services, as if there were no revolution at all". He watched the proclamation of the new government in Place Kléber and called it "a farce". Meanwhile, children were throwing red, white, and blue streamers on the Kléber statue while soldiers "tried to look bold, but the public didn't take them seriously". When he went to the train station to buy a ticket, a soldier tried to enforce an order: "The Soldiers' Council orders you to close your counter. No more travel!" The ticket clerk ignored the order and kept issuing tickets with a shrug. The Alsatians, knowing that the French were already on the way, saw this revolution as a masquerade, one last stupidity to add to many others. So the soldier backed off, afraid of reprisals. Spindler returned home and wrote: "News of the revolution has already reached Boersch with more or less fanciful details: little importance is attached to it, and it is seen as a machiavellian manoeuvre intended to evade the armistice".

Husser described an explosion of tricolour cockades in Mulhouse: "Even people who otherwise appear quite serious are wearing them". A "military council", he noted, ordered soldiers to remove them by force if necessary but it is unclear how successful this was. In any case, the council could not prevent protests outside the homes of unpopular individuals, "among others, teachers who became hated for denunciations, or even physical assaults. By issuing military fitness certificates without leniency, he [a teacher] made fierce enemies". The military council appeared to cooperate with the municipal council to issue calls for calm, and a delegation was sent to the French camp to ask that French troops arrive as soon as possible to prevent disorder after the departure of German troops.

By midday on 10 November, Peirotes, Meyer, and Rebholz had issued a joint call for calm, urging the population to follow the two councils' instructions. Peirotes summoned the delegates of the workers' and soldiers' councils meeting at the Palais de Justice to elect a thirteen-member executive committee. Among the elected members were Charles Frey and Victor Antoni, whose goal was to keep the unrest in check. Also on the committee was the German captain Erik Reinartz, who instead sought to radicalise the movement and co-opt it towards the neutralist project. The committee was chaired by Rebholz, who acted as a moderating force among its members, getting the executive council to prioritise freedom of speech and the release of political prisoners. A civic guard was established, not without difficulty, under a magistrate turned chief of police, Jules Lévy, to counteract the armed and extremist bands loyal to Captain Reinartz. By the evening of 10 November, two political powers were in control of Strasbourg, both now meeting in permanent session: the executive committee of workers' and soldiers' councils on the one hand, and the bourgeois municipal council on the other.

== Other towns in Alsace ==
The uprising spread to other garrisons and towns in Alsace, with revolutionary councils formed in Mulhouse on 9 November and in Colmar on 10 November, followed by Haguenau, Sélestat, and other cities. Driven by revolutionary sailors returning from Kiel and Wilhelmshaven and actively supported by the local workers' movements, these combined councils of workers and soldiers paralleled other such bodies set up in the general revolutionary atmosphere of the expiring German Reich.

A group of mutineering sailors arrived in Metz on 8 November and freed soldiers imprisoned in the military jails there. Together they marched to the town hall, which they adorned with a red flag hastily made from an Ottoman flag, its crescent and star covered with red lead paint. Local social-democratic trade unionists set up a revolutionary council led by Hans-Heinrich Voortmann, a socialist locksmith and non-commissioned officer from Strasbourg. The military governor of Metz, General Arnold Lequis, submitted to the revolutionary council and the German civilian administration also collapsed, with the authority of the district president of Lorraine, Karl von Gemmingen-Hornberg, swept aside. The municipal government of Metz and its mayor Roger Forêt chose to cooperate with the revolutionary council and jointly issued a call for calm on 9 November. Disorder was limited to a few incidents of looting of food shops, and some officers were roughed up and stripped of their insignia. However, statues of members of the House of Hohenzollern and other monarchic emblems throughout the city were left untouched by the insurgents.

In Haguenau, a group of sailors from Wissembourg created a soldiers' council on the evening of 9 November. On the morning of 10 November, in the various barracks of Saverne, soldiers refused to obey their officers and formed a council. The revolutionaries of Sélestat wore red armbands as a badge of recognition and set their first objective as maintaining discipline within the units. In Guebwiller, the election of the soldiers' council was preceded by a large demonstration, led by a red flag, with local trade union leaders in attendance. Soldiers from Bergholtz, Issenheim, and Soultz also took part. The soldiers' councils replaced the old military hierarchy, and in less than two days Alsace was covered in a network of workers' and soldiers' councils as trains carried the revolution from one barracks to another throughout Alsace. All over the region the Alsatian population watched as troops returned home carrying red flags and wearing red cockades. Ordinary soldiers led these troops with their officers marching beside them, stripped of their ranks and unarmed.

Revolutionary councils also appeared in Bischwiller, Erstein, Molsheim, Mutzig, Neuf-Brisach, Ribeauvillé, Saint-Louis, and Schiltigheim. Overall, the region saw the creation of thirty revolutionary councils – fifteen in Alsace, and fifteen in Moselle-Lorraine – with their primary aim being to maintain order and prevent looting.

== The Republic of Councils ==
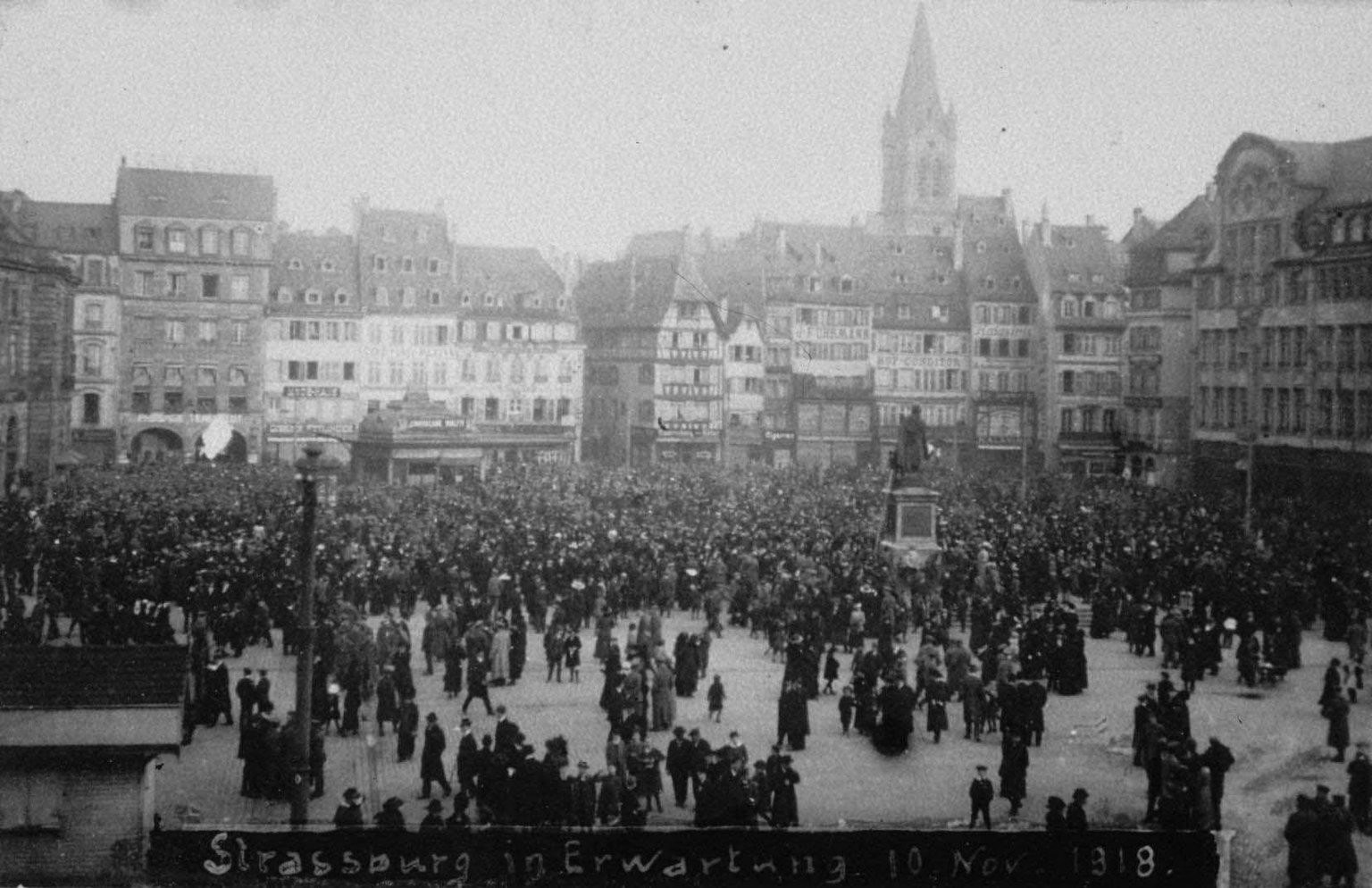

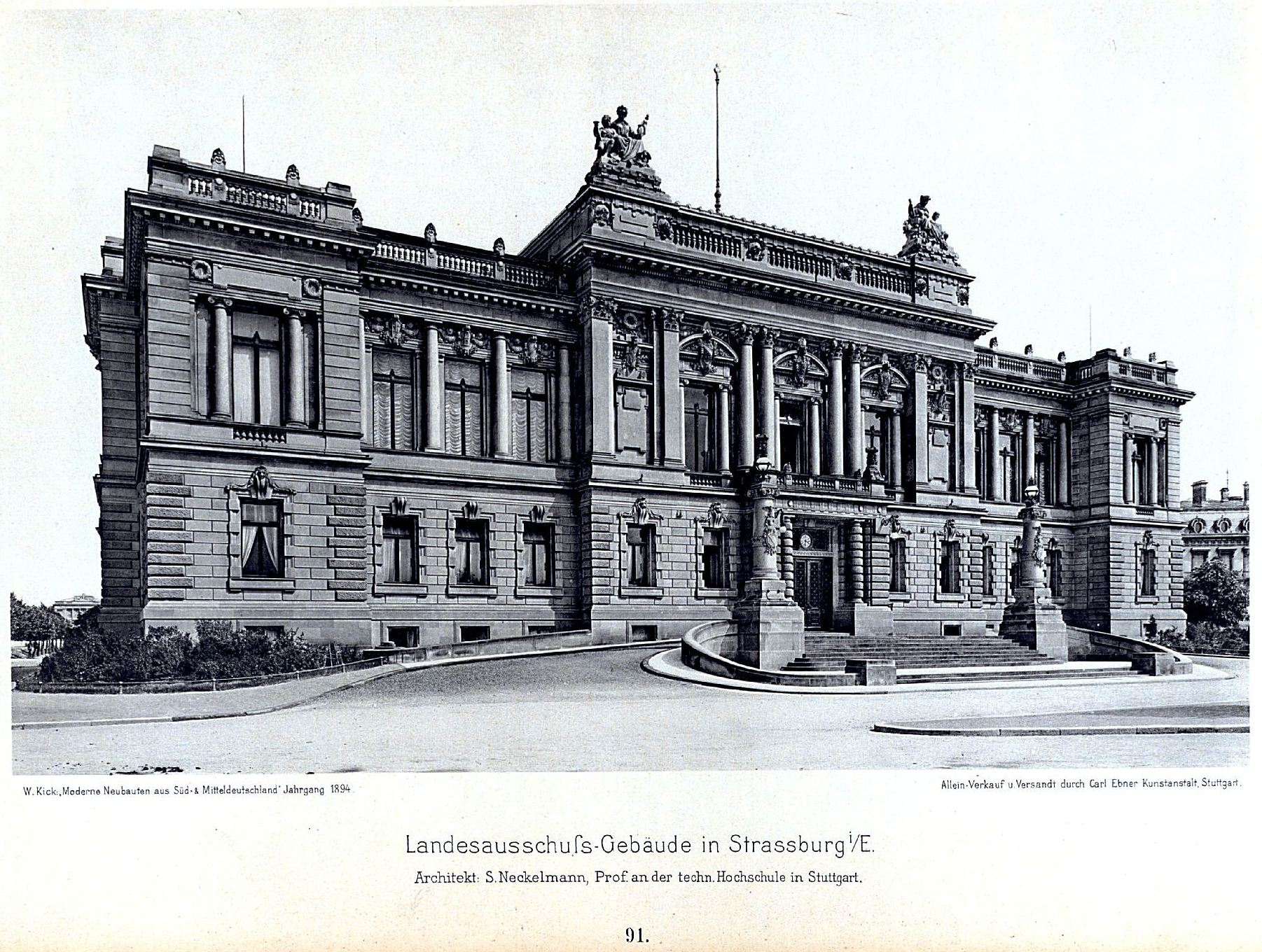
Palace of the Diet of Alsace-Lorraine, where the deputies of the Landtag and the members of the National Council sit.

As early as 9 November – the day Emperor Wilhelm II abdicated – around ten deputies from the Landtag of Alsace-Lorraine sought to fill the resulting institutional vacuum by transforming their regional assembly into a sovereign "National Council". Formed on the initiative of local notables, this group of elected representatives was backed by the vast majority of the population. Gathering in Strasbourg around deputy Auguste Labroise they decided to convene the official session of their "Second Chamber of the Landtag" on 12 November, a day earlier than originally scheduled.

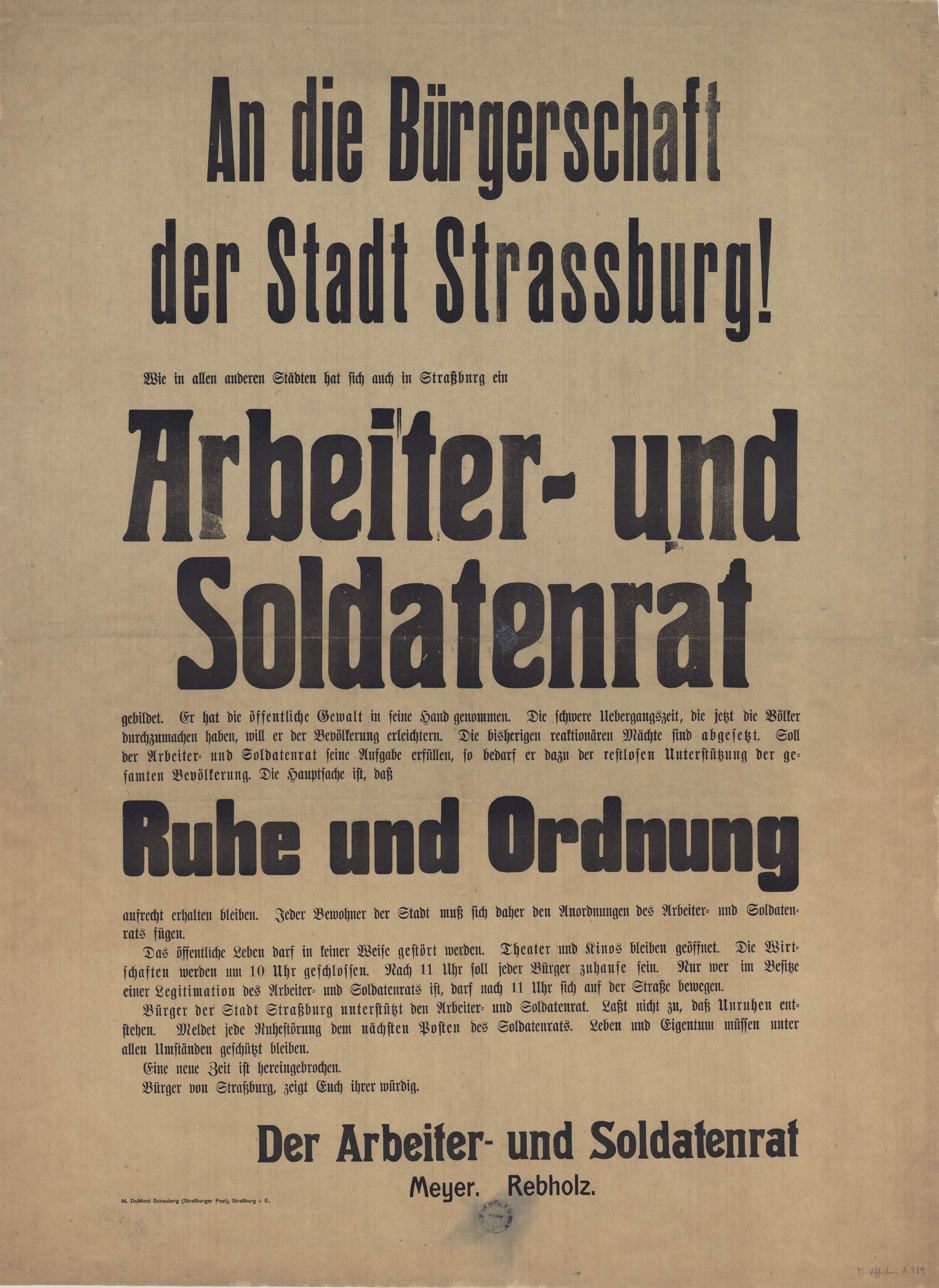

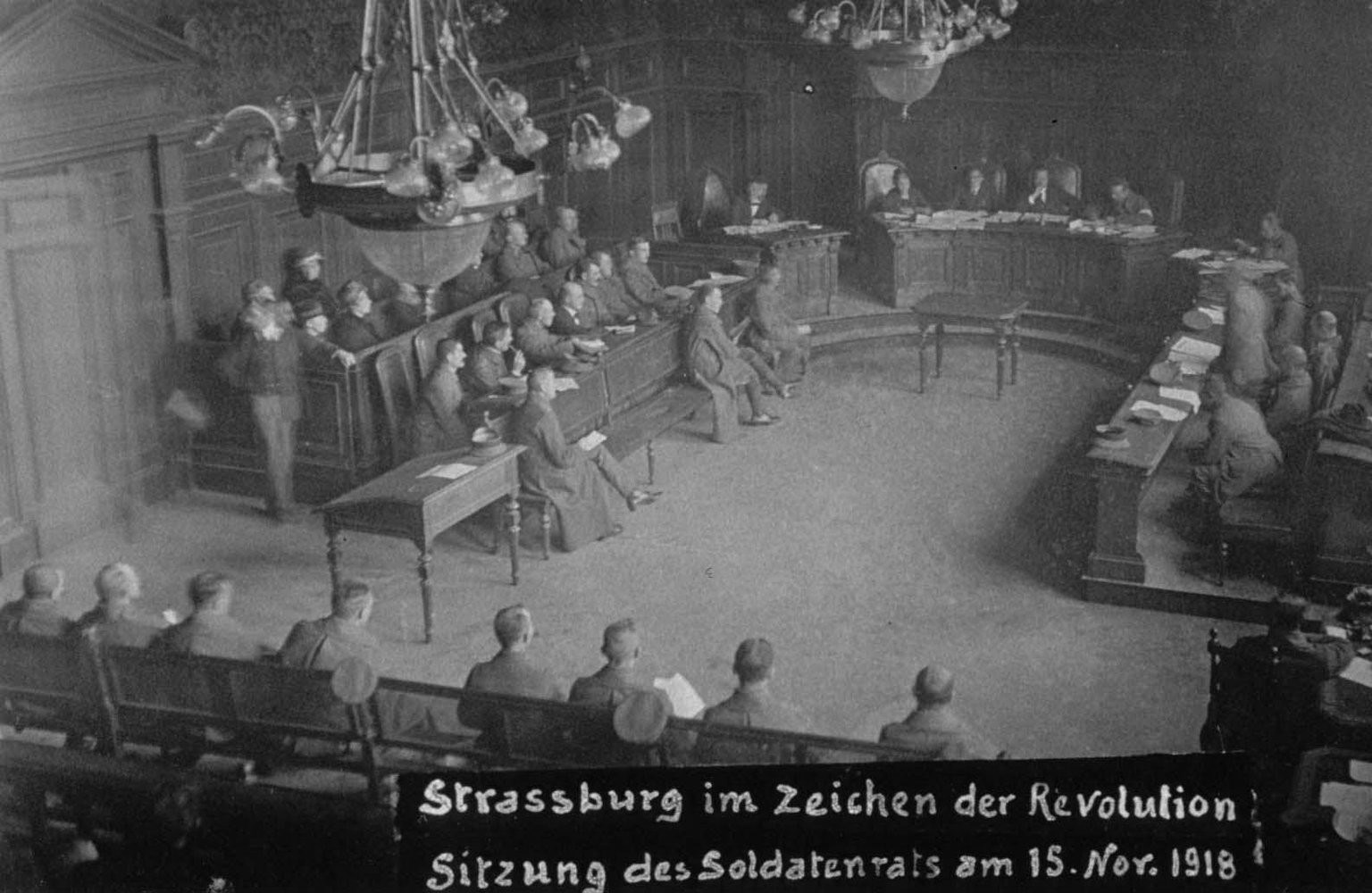
The soldiers' council meeting in what is now the Assize Court chamber of the Strasbourg Palais de Justice on 15 November 1918.

However, the revolutionary events unfolding in Strasbourg hastened the process and the Landtag was instead convened on 11 November at the Palace of the Diet of Alsace-Lorraine. Inspired by the examples of national councils formed in Czechoslovakia, Poland, and Bukovina following the collapse of Austria-Hungary, the Alsatian and Lorraine deputies proclaimed themselves the "National Council of Alsace-Lorraine" (Nationalrat, also known as Alsace-Lorraine Soviet Republic; French: République des conseils d'Alsace-Lorraine; German: Räterepublik Elsaß-Lothringen; Alsatian: D' Rotrepüblik Elsass-Lothrìnge; Moselle Franconian/Luxembourgish: D'Réitrepublik Elsass-Loutrengen). Led by Eugène Ricklin, this council of notables claimed to be the legitimate bearer of sovereignty, and given the seriousness of the situation resolved to sit in permanent session alongside Strasbourg's two other centres of power: the bourgeois municipal council, and the workers' and soldiers' council. Parallel to this proclamation of an independent republic by the parliament of the Reichsland, a soldiers' council had also proclaimed a republic similar to Karl Liebknecht's in Berlin, although MSPD forces ultimately prevailed and thwarted the attempt to establish a council republic (Räterepublik).

The National Council was recognised beyond Alsace-Lorraine by the Council of People's Deputies in Berlin – now the official government of the Reich – and even received congratulations from Reichskanzler Friedrich Ebert. In Strasbourg, Laurent Meyer and the MSPD Eugène Imbs, members of both the National Council and the executive committee of the workers' and soldiers' councils, were tasked with maintaining communication between the new body and their own organisations.

Following the resignation of Schwander and the Hauss government, an administrative commission (Verwaltungsausschuß) was established to handle day-to-day affairs. This commission instructed civil servants to remain in their posts to ensure continuity of administration during the political transition. It continued to organise supplies, oversee the return of refugees, manage the demobilisation of Alsace-Lorraine soldiers, and negotiated a swift end to the railway workers' strike.

However, the notables still had to contend with the workers' and soldiers' councils. The MSPD-led National Council's plan to declare Alsace-Lorraine's reintegration into France on 13 November prompted an immediate reaction from the pro-German nationalist faction within the soldiers' council, led by Captain Reinartz. Part of the group wanted to arrest members of the National Council and establish a revolutionary regime to resist the French army's approach to Strasbourg.

Reinartz and two of his colleagues went to the Palais de la Diète where they were greeted by Eugène Imbs, François Hoën, and Jacques Peirotes. The representatives of the soldiers' council declared that they could not accept the existence of a Francophile-dominated and essentially bourgeois National Council. The revolutionaries claimed to have "5,000 undefeated German soldiers, armed to the teeth, equipped with machine guns and hand grenades [...] If the National Council wants to avoid a bloodbath, it must remove these [Francophile] emblems so as not to provoke the soldiers". The National Council yielded without submitting to the soldiers' council's authority, agreeing to calm the situation by delaying any declaration in favour of France and refraining from displaying the tricolour. So while the National Council had initially intended to proclaim Alsace-Lorraine's annexation by France on 13 November, it was forced to postpone the declaration.

== Revolutionary radicalisation ==
The defeat and demobilisation of German troops in the region prompted many soldiers to converge on Strasbourg station in the hope of finding a train to cross Germany and return home. Such a large concentration of soldiers in the city became problematic as it strained supplies and made it difficult to maintain order. Despite various appeals from the different councils, calm was not restored. Military stores were looted, and the soldiers' council opened fire on the looters. A poster condemning the trafficking of military goods threatened anyone caught in the act with imprisonment and the confiscation of their property. Following the first group of sailors who had arrived from northern German ports a few days earlier, a second contingent from Wilhelmshaven reached Strasbourg on 14 November, further influencing the city's revolutionary movement. Under pressure from Captain Reinartz and the soldiers' councils, the insurrection was becoming more radicalised, with the new slogan: "Neither German, nor French, nor neutral. Long Live the International Social Democracy."

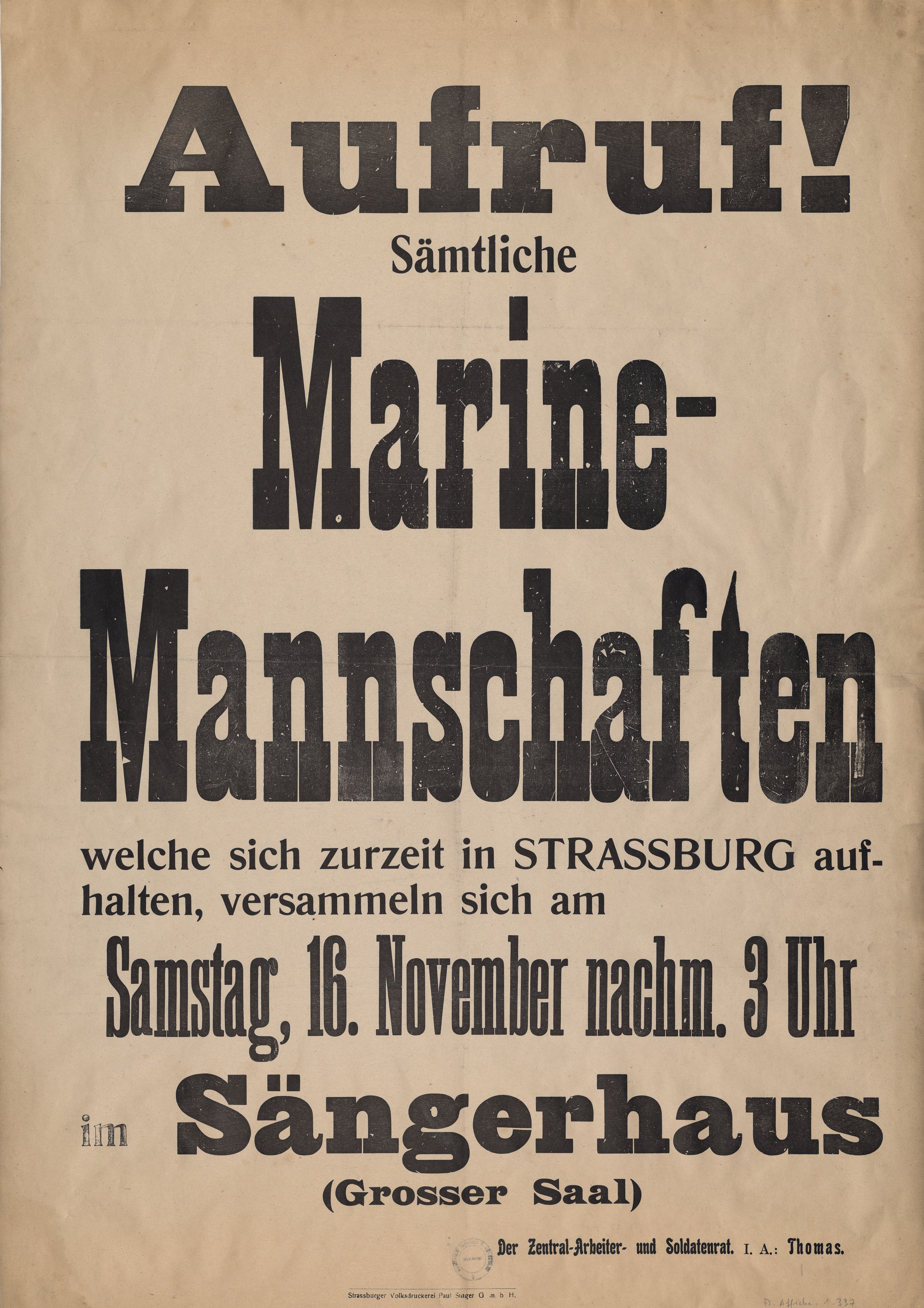
A Strasbourg poster calling on sailors to raise up.

It was in this context that the revolutionary red flag was fastened by a daring climber to the spire of Strasbourg Cathedral at around 3.00 pm on 12 November. The head of the sailors from Wilhelmshaven, Wendelin Thomas declared: "That the red flag flies over the cathedral is a sign that socialist theory has ceased to be a theory and become a reality… A new era has begun, that of entering the era of humanity… The ultimate aim is the civilising mission, the brotherhood of workers".

As president of the executive committee of the workers' and soldiers' councils, Johann Rebholz acted as a moderating voice in the debates among revolutionaries in Strasbourg. Already questioned on 10 November about banning the red flag, Rebholz responded: "We must deal with the existing balance of power, and everyone should be free to fly the flag of their choice". At first, he opposed raising the red flag: "The red flag would only frighten the Alsatian population". Nevertheless, despite the MSPD's contrary position the red flag was accepted as a minimum point of agreement between the factions, symbolising "the collapse of German power". Faced with mounting concern Peirotes declared that, "If the red flag is raised on the cathedral, it's because those who did it are stronger than us. Against that, we can do nothing".

== End of the revolution ==
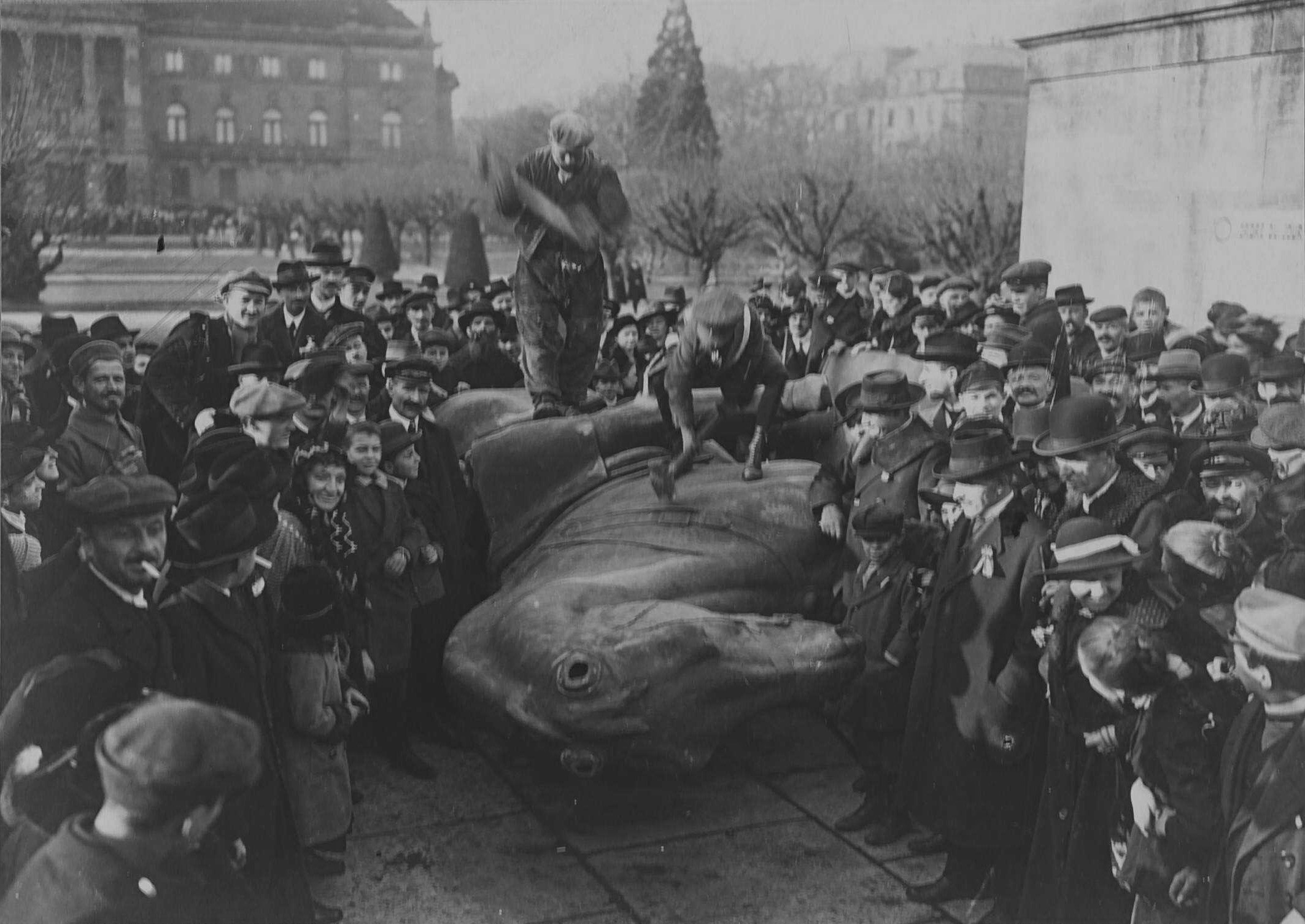

As stipulated by the Armistice of 11 November 1918, the workers' and soldiers' councils across Alsace-Lorraine dissolved themselves automatically following the withdrawal of German troops between 11 and 17 November. Several days then passed between the signing of the Armistice and the arrival of French troops in the various towns of Alsace-Lorraine. But after the armies of the Entente crossed the former front line they advanced through the region more rapidly than anticipated due to fears of revolutionary contagion.

French soldiers finally entered Alsace-Lorraine towns between 17 and 22 November, putting the region under military occupation and stabilising the situation. Strikes were terminated by force and agitators were arrested. In Moselle Lorraine, the advance of the troops commanded by General Émile Fayolle was slowed by the gradual retreat of the German army, and it was not until 20 November that they reached the line between Völklingen, Saarbrücken, and Sarreguemines. In Metz, a welcoming committee was formed around Francophile figures opposed to the German authorities, with the workers' and soldiers' council voluntarily standing down once the French soldiers of General Henri Gouraud's 4th Army entered the suburbs of Strasbourg on 22 November.

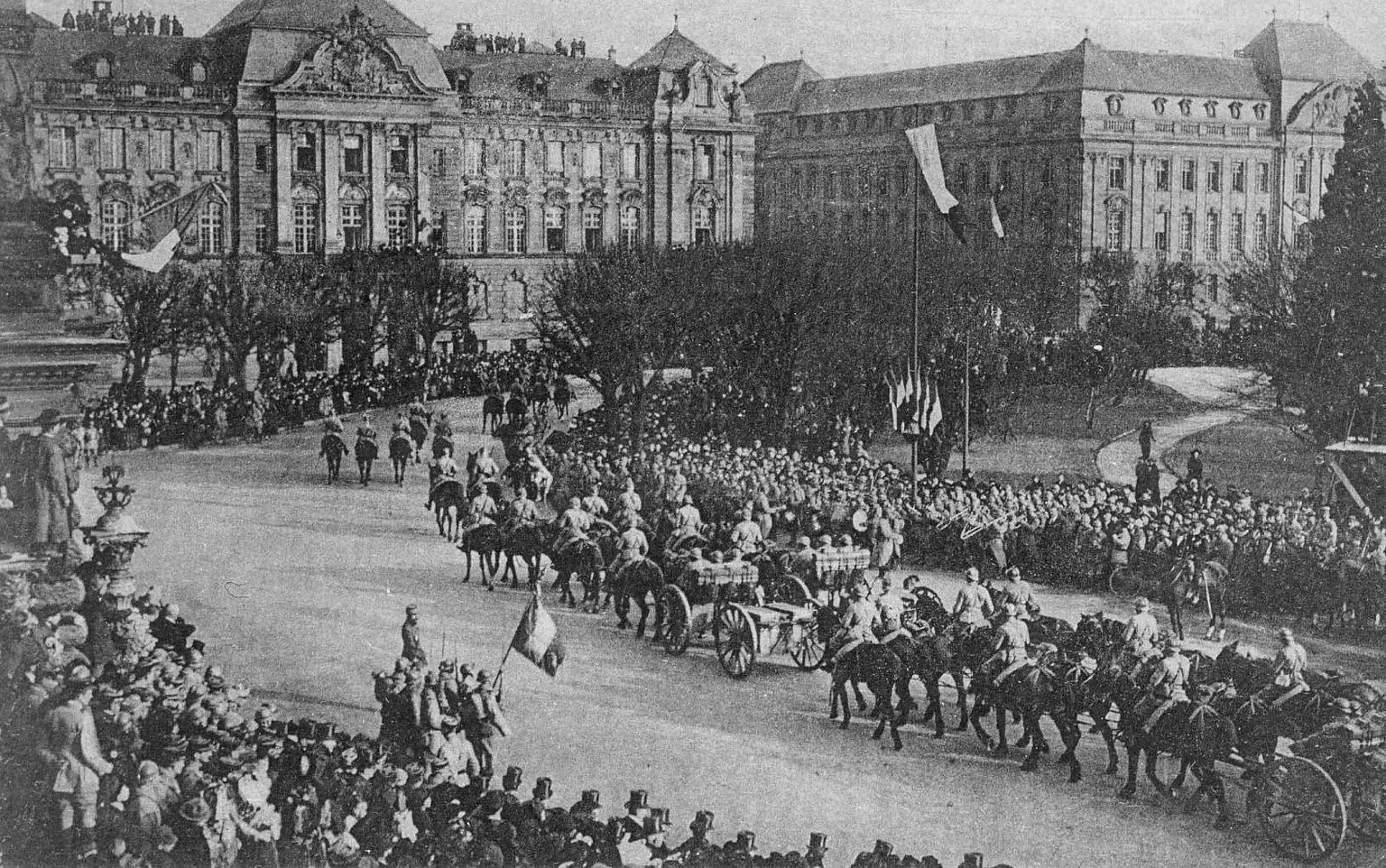
Parade of the French 4th Army on Place de la République in Strasbourg on 22 November 1918.

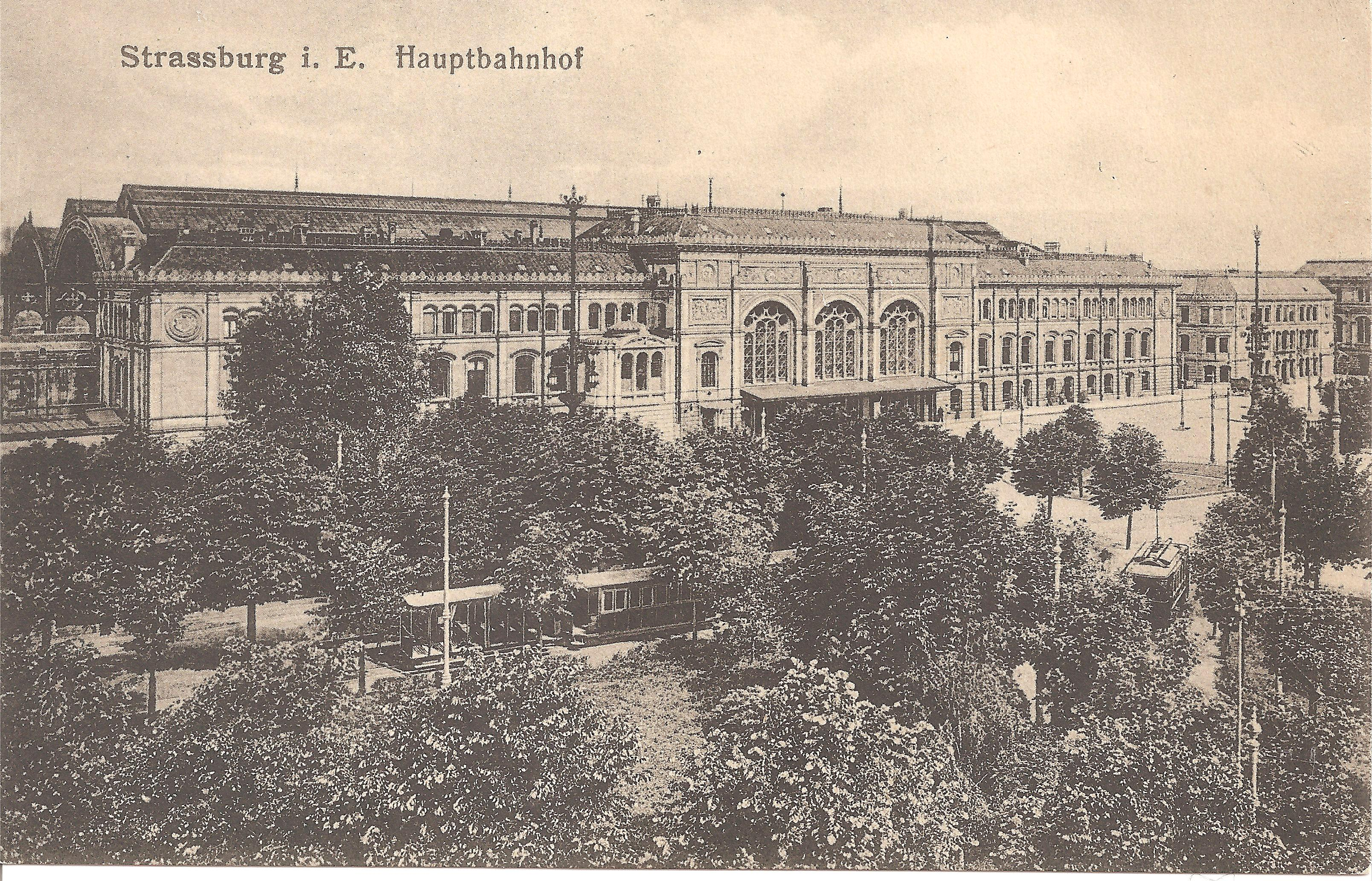
The Strasbourg Railway Station, where the first Workers' and Soldiers' Council was established in 1918 Alsace-Lorraine

The troops were greeted triumphantly by the section of the population in favour of France, who had carefully prepared for their arrival. The popular celebration was partly spontaneous and partly orchestrated, but not universally shared. Indeed, a significant portion of the population remained pro-German or favoured Alsace-Lorraine's neutrality. The executive committee of the Strasbourg councils continued to sit until 22 November, the same day the red flag was removed from the cathedral at the request of the MSPD deputy Jacques Peirotes.

On 5 December the MSPD-led National Council of Alsace-Lorraine finally voted unanimously in favour of returning Alsace to France, although this process did not gain international recognition until the signature of the Treaty of Versailles in 1919. Raymond Poincaré, President of the French Republic, and Georges Clemenceau, President of the Council, travelled from Paris and were received in the region from 8 to 10 December to prepare for the reintegration of the "lost provinces," pointedly refusing to meet the leaders of the National Council. From the balcony of Strasbourg's town hall Poincaré delivered a carefully crafted phrase to an enthusiastic crowd – "The plebiscite is done!" – thus avoiding the need for a referendum with an uncertain outcome. The streets named "Rue du 22 Novembre" in Strasbourg and Mulhouse commemorate this return of Alsace to France, although the region lost its recently acquired autonomy and reverted to the centralised French system as the départements of Moselle, Haut-Rhin, and Bas-Rhin.

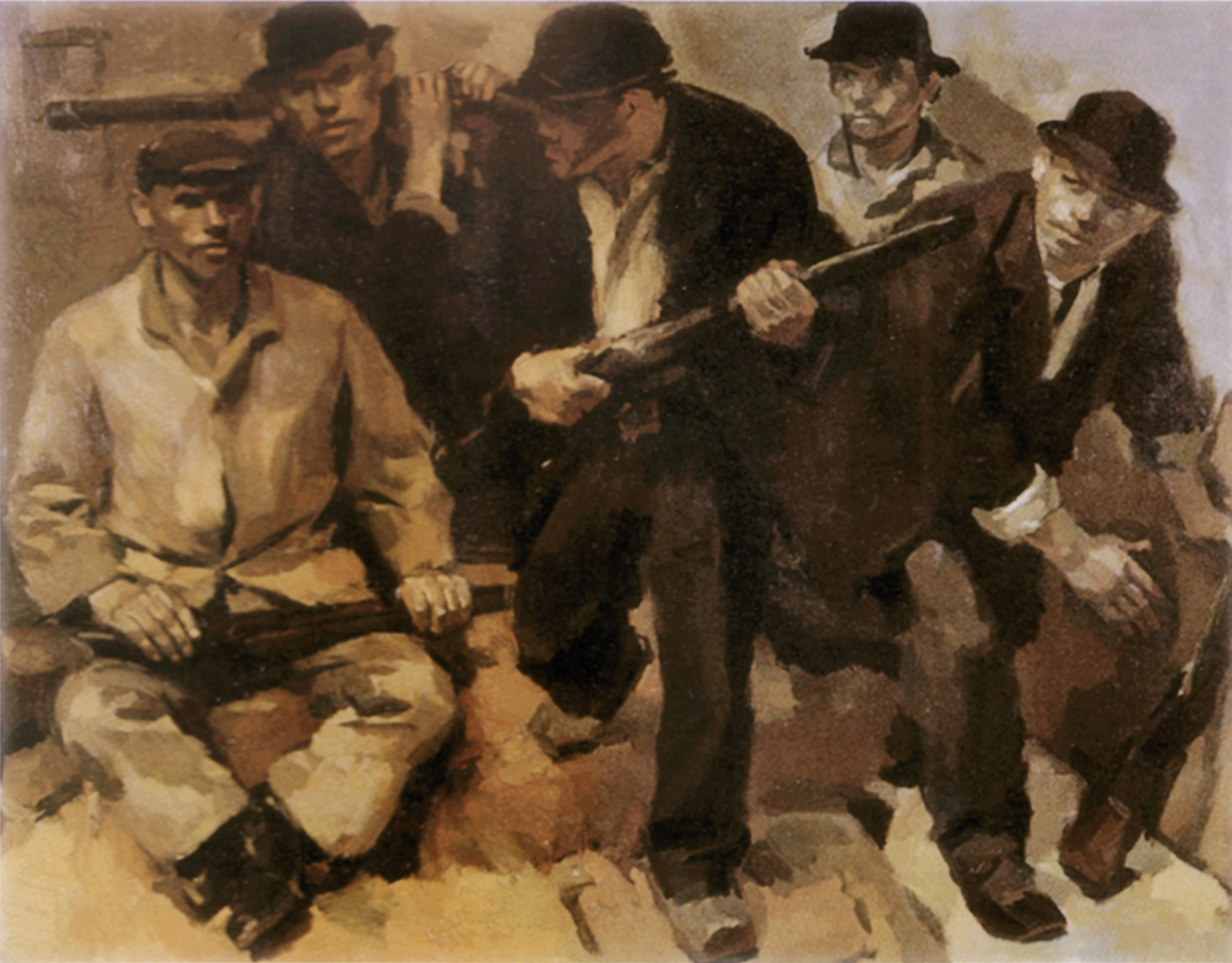
The Revolution, painting by Strasbourg artist René Beeh, circa 1919.

== Response to French takeover ==
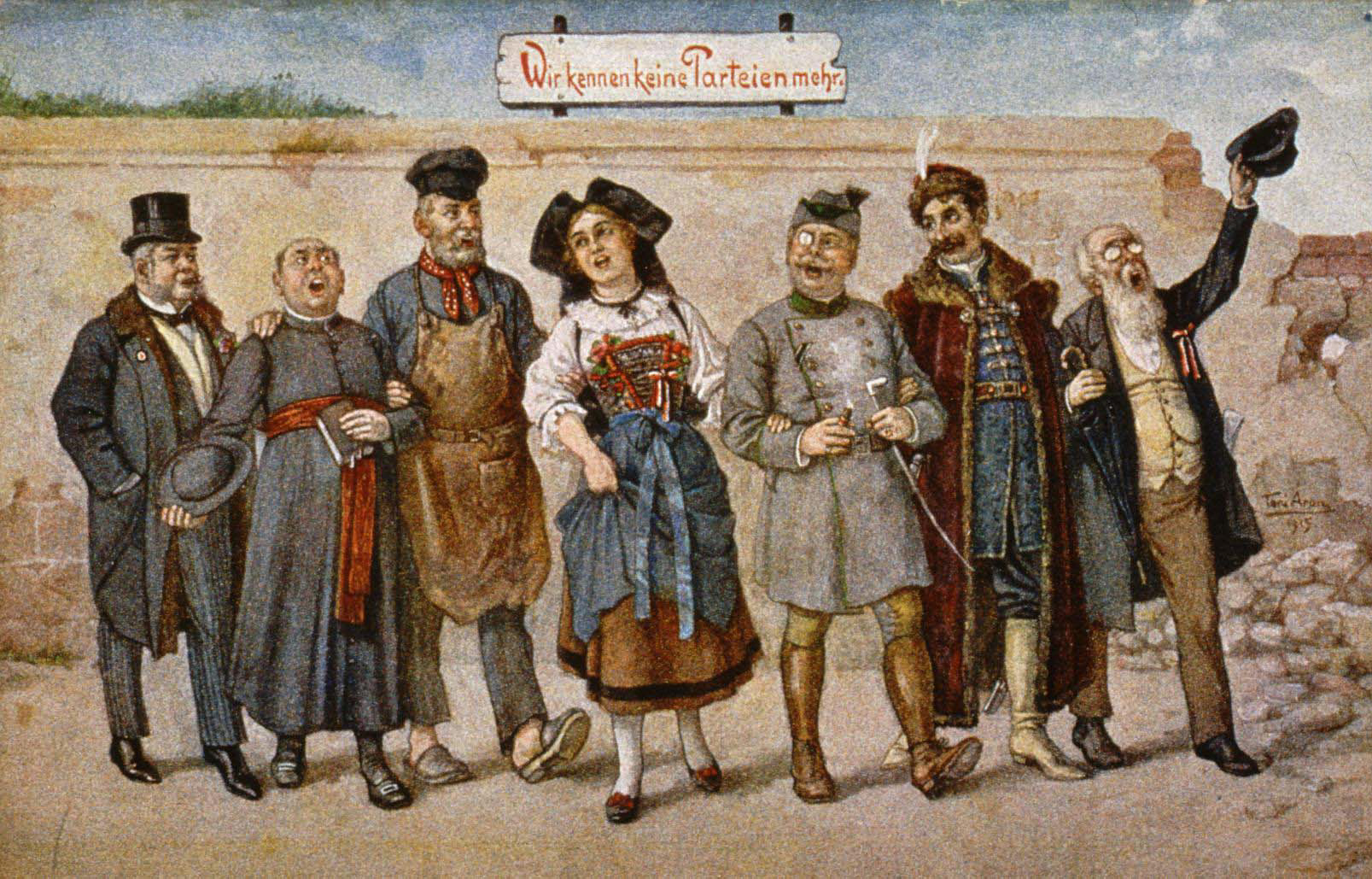
An Alsatian postcard published during WWI depicts the unity (in support of Germany) of various social classes (bourgeois, clergy, worker, peasant woman, civil servant, aristocrat, teacher), saying "Wir kennen keine Parteien mehr" ("We no longer know any parties")

By the war's end Alsatian public opinion appeared to favour reunification with France, the result of the populace being worn down both by the conflict itself and the military dictatorship imposed on the region by Germany at the outbreak of hostilities. On 25 February 1918, Statthalter Johann von Dallwitz reflected this process when he wrote, "Sympathies for France and aversion to Germans have reached a frightening depth among the petty bourgeoisie and peasant circles", and on 2 November he observed that, "In the cities, joy predominates at the prospect of becoming French. Various reservations are also expressed, particularly in the countryside. Reason is not ready to rush in blindly after the impulses of the heart".

Within the thirty councils across Alsace-Lorraine there were incontestable German nationalist positions, defended by officers and soldiers originating from various regions of Germany, as well as by some activists aligned with the MSDP, the UPSD, or even communism. Due to it being a part of the German proletarian socialist revolution, the uprising in Alsace-Lorraine was judged to be Germanophile, or even perceived as a manoeuvre favouring the neutralist project.

The jubilation of Alsatians and Lorrainers favouring the arrival of France was mirrored by the dejection of Germans, who were all the more dismayed by how quickly events unfolded. Everyone tried to cope as best they could, and on 6 November the Germanophile Philippe Husser wrote, "Families of German origin are packing up and preparing to leave", although moving to Stuttgart, say, cost 3,000 marks. Others tried to pass themselves off as Alsatians or Lorrainers, only to be told that "cats don't give birth to dogs". The Prussian head forest ranger of Lassaux spoke of his French ancestry and the administrator of Obernai became engaged to an Alsatian woman ten years older than he was.

Husser wrote in his diary on October 16, "I leaf through the paper. The news is depressing. Germany has lost the war…", adding, "Most hope – some fear – that Alsace-Lorraine will soon be French". He attributes this public sentiment to the conduct of the German army in Alsace: "What is unforgivable is having treated Alsace as enemy territory. Who is to blame for the sympathy towards Germany – which was undeniable in Alsace-Lorraine at first – being turned into its opposite during the war, if not the military authorities' lack of consideration?"

In his journal Charles Spindler described the joy of some of his fellow Alsatians at the distress of German immigrants now leaving the region. On 6 November he noted that his sister returned from Strasbourg where she had bought tricolour ribbons and paper, reporting, "That's all that's being sold now, in both German shops and old Alsatian houses". On 8 November he wrote, "Newspapers such as the Neue Zeitung and Der Elsässer proclaim Alsace's attachment to France," adding, "It's a strange feeling to read in print what until now had only been whispered among friends". Now it was those who did not welcome the return of France who only dared express it in private, and the population of Altdeutscher (Old German) origin remained anxiously hidden away in their homes. According to Spindler, the communist revolution of 10 November was merely a comedy aimed at keeping Alsace-Lorraine in the Reich, with the participants unaware of Paul von Hindenburg's secret telegrams instructing all military leaders to agree with the soldiers' councils at all costs, and, if needed, to provoke their formation.

== Fallout ==
Contrary to the hopes of the leaders of the former Reichsland of Alsace-Lorraine who had placed their trust in President Wilson's promises, the territory would not benefit from the new right of peoples to self-determination. Instead, the Treaty of Versailles ceded Alsace and the Lorraine district to France under a special legal regime whereby the territory was divided into three departments:

- Moselle, encompassing the Lorraine territories that had been lost in 1871, but excluding the Vosges;
- Haut-Rhin; and
- Bas-Rhin, which retained the cantons of Schirmeck and Saales, despite these having originally belonged to the Vosges before the application of the 1871 Treaty of Frankfurt.

As the cantons of Schirmeck and Saales remained part of the Bas-Rhin – specifically, the arrondissement of Molsheim – the department of the Vosges remained amputated from the upper Bruche valley, which it had lost in 1871. Similarly, the arrondissement of Belfort – which had been detached from the Haut-Rhin to remain French – was not reunited with its original department either, and in 1922 it became a full department under the name Territoire de Belfort. Elsewhere, Meurthe-et-Moselle remained unchanged, maintaining the same departmental boundaries it had had since 1871.

In the recovered territories French replaced German in public services and schools via a direct method of instruction which abruptly imposed French without transition. This disregard for the predominantly German-speaking parts of the population proved traumatic, even for the Lorraine Franconian and Alsatian-speaking communities who had remained Francophile. This was particularly so in the non-German-speaking parts of the former Reichsland such as the Romance-speaking Moselle and the pays welche, where the Germans had continued French-language instruction during their occupation.

A sorting commission divided the Alsace-Lorraine population into four citizen categories, marked A-B-C-D on identity cards. This classification was based on ancestry and perceived degree of francophilia, with each class enjoying different levels of civic rights. Additionally, the French authorities implemented a purge policy under which around 200,000 Alsatians or Lorrainers deemed "German" or not sufficiently francophile were abruptly expelled and their property confiscated. Conversely, Alsatians and Lorrainers whose families had opted for France and emigrated after the 1871 annexation returned to their native regions. Half of the expelled Germans would eventually be allowed to return at the request of the United States.

The occupying French soldiers discovered that the Alsace-Lorraine population had been far better integrated into the Reich than the stereotypical propaganda had portrayed, and this disconnect between the French soldiers and public opinion, along with the haste to incorporate these regions fully into the French Republic (with the exception of laïcité), the extreme policies of francisation, and the brutal expulsions all contributed to the emergence of the "Alsace-Lorraine malaise". This unease would manifest in early 1919 and persist right up to the eve of World War II, notably in the strong electoral support for autonomist parties across various elections.

Overall, the Alsace-Lorraine Republic of Councils was never a council republic like the Bavarian Soviet Republic, since the movement's internal weaknesses meant there was no organised resistance to defend the revolutionary council movement against the French occupation. Some see the "councils' revolution" as just a desperate attempt by the German authorities to retain Alsace-Lorraine within the Reich. And after the broader revolution destroyed the German monarchist authorities, the only functioning German authority in Alsace-Lorraine was the MSPD-dominated government, which was a deadly foe of the revolutionary council movement. The broader council movement was eventually defeated by the constant crackdown of Chancellor Ebert's administration across the Reich in the following two years, making it difficult to imagine an Ebert government-backed council movement ever continuing to exist in Alsace-Lorraine.

Half a century later, under the title "An Immense Confusion", contemporary witness Robert Heitz had this to say about the events of November 1918:

"The weeks leading up to the liberation of 22nd November 1918 were marked by immense confusion — crowds on the move, processions, demonstrations, looting, brawls, gunfire, but also secret plots, endless discussions, pretence, and double-dealing: a tangled web that is difficult to unravel. All the more so because none of the main actors in the local tragicomedy that followed the great slaughter left behind a complete account of events."

== See also ==
- Bavarian Soviet Republic
- Bremen Soviet Republic
- German Revolution
- Republic of Baden
- Soviet (council)

== Sources ==
- Döblin, A.: Bourgeois & soldats (Novembre 1918), novel, ISBN 2-87653-046-5. In French. Part I of a tetralogy; the whole four books are available in German, ISBN 3-423-59030-0.
- Eschbach, J.: Au Cœur de la Résistance Alsacienne. Le Combat de Paul Dingler, Bentzinger, 2005. ISBN 2-84629-068-7.
- Troester, J.: 22 novembre 1918 : les Français à Strasbourg, in La Grande Guerre Magazine 38, April 2003.
