= Kurt von Holleben =

German chemist (1894-1947)

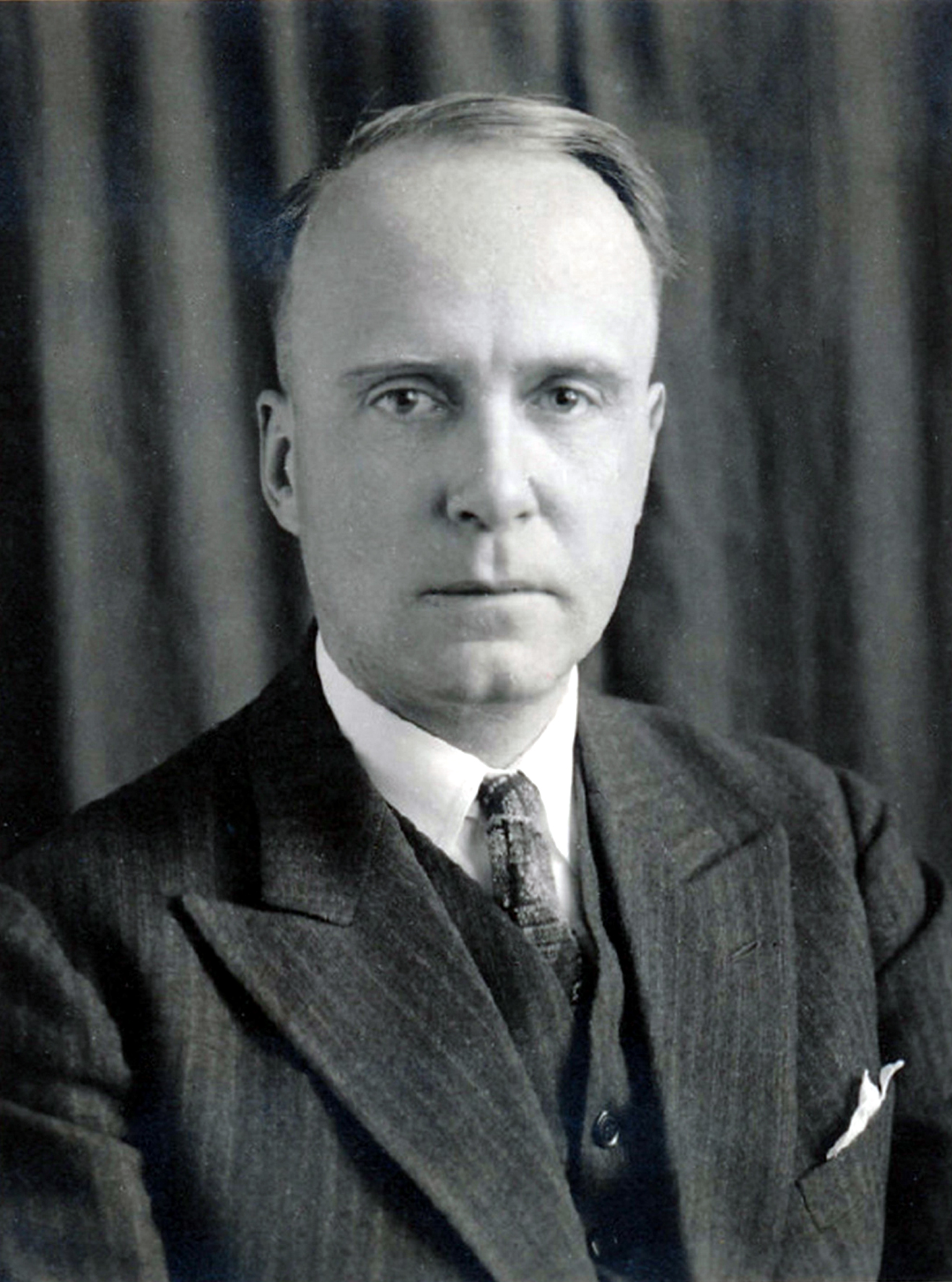
- Born: Albert Julius Ludwig Kurt von Holleben; 7 March 1894
- Died: 14 January 1947 (aged 52); Marburg, Marburg-Biedenkopf, Hessen, Germany
- Education: University of Heidelberg; Technical University of Dresden
- Known for: Photography, chemistry

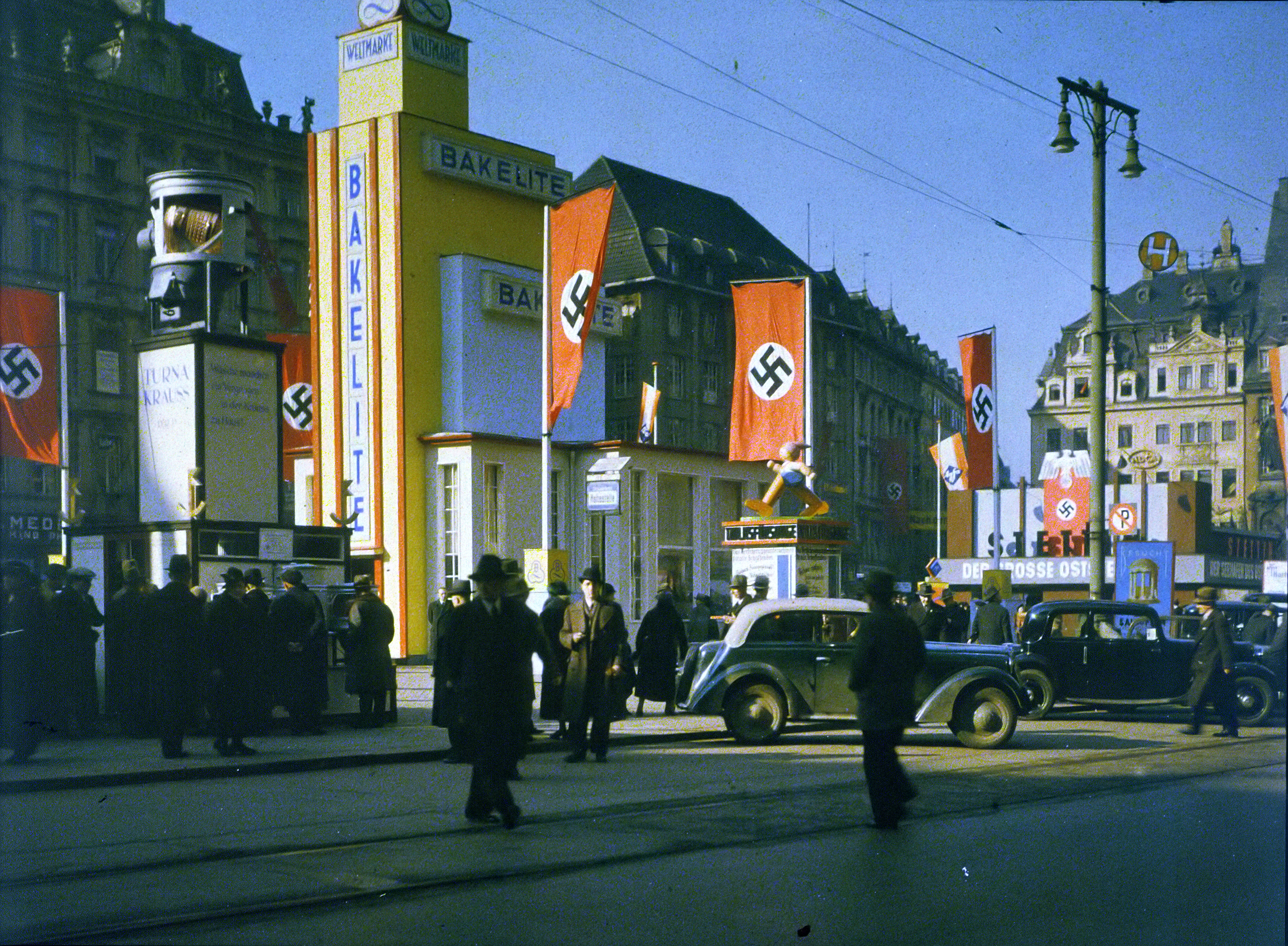
Leipzig Marktplatz March 1937

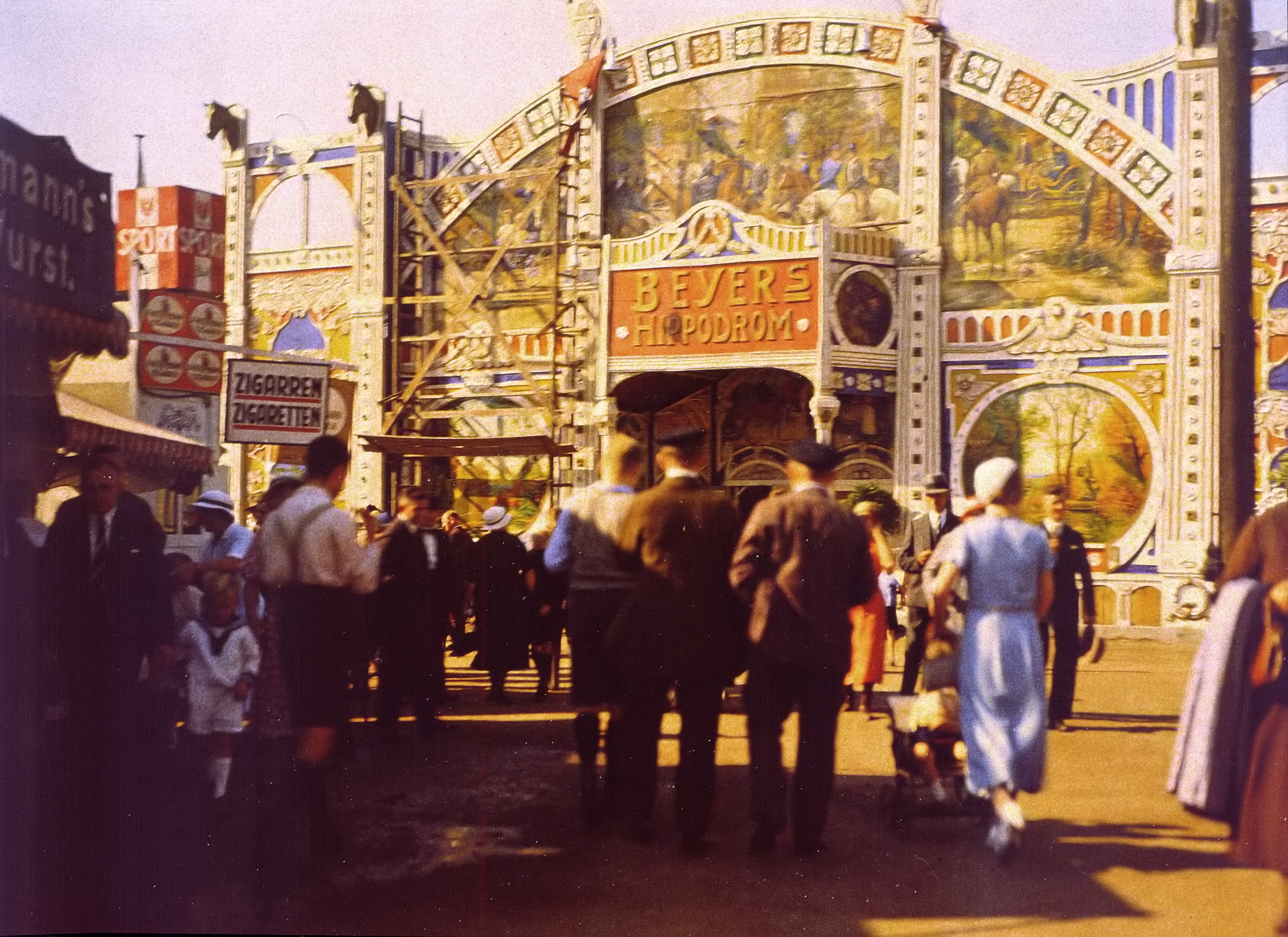
Leipzig Kleinmesse Beyers Hippodrome September 1934

Kurt von Holleben (7 March 1894 – 14 January 1947) was a German chemist working for Agfa-Gevaert Technical-Scientific Laboratory as the head of the colour screen research group, overseeing development of Additive color screens (kornraster) for the Agfa-Farbenplatte glass plates (1916), and film based Agfacolor (1932) and Agfacolor Ultra (1934) ranges.

== Early life ==
Albert Julius Ludwig Kurt von Holleben was born in Berlin, the only child of Auguste Marie Elisabeth (Wrede) (13 September 1868 – 7 October 1951) and Captain Curt Emil Ludwig von Holleben (5 April 1862 – 17 February 1910) of the Prussian Army 2nd Guard Regiment of Foot. His maternal grandfather was Wilhelm August Julius Wrede (23 January 1822 – 28 December 1895) the wealthy banker, sugar beet and spirits producer who owned the Schloss Britz (Britz castle) in Berlin. His paternal grandfather Albert Hermann Ludwig von Holleben (24 April 1835 – 1 January 1906) was a military historian, writer and Lieutenant General in the Prussian army.

When Holleben was born the family were living at 6 Alexander Ufer in Berlin, but later that year his father is listed as the owner of Schloss Halbau in Silesia (today Iłowa Palace in Poland). In 1898, Holleben's father was made an honorary Knight of the Order of Saint John by Prince Albert of Prussia. Members of the Knights Hospitaller make generous donations to charitable causes. By 1901 Schloss Halbau had been sold, and the family disappear from records until 1905 when the records show them living in a rented house in Wiesbaden and that Holleben's father has returned to his army duties.

His early schooling was in Wiesbaden and following that, the Dreikönigschule grammar school in Dresden. His parents divorced in February 1909, with Kurt and his mother moving to a rented apartment in Dresden. Following the death of his father in 1910, his mother married Baron (Freiherr) Kurt von Brandenstein (18 August 1870 – 4 June 1939), an up-and-coming lawyer and financier who would go on to become a privy councilor to the Saxon Ministry of Finance.

Holleben graduated at Easter of 1913 and then went to Heidelberg University to study law. He was a member of the Corps Vandalia Heidelberg.

== Military service 1914 - 1918 ==
On the outbreak of war Holleben left his law studies in order to volunteer for service with the army. He tried enlisting in various regiments but they all turned him down on medical grounds.

He was however, accepted into the Imperial Volunteer Automobile Corps. These were normally civilians under contract, who in times of war would, with their private automobiles, form a transport unit for the staff officers. The owner/driver wore the corps uniform with Lieutenant rank epaulets; they were teamed with a mechanic who would wear a Sergeant's uniform.

He was assigned as a driver to officers of the General Staff (presumably in Berlin). At the beginning of 1915, he was reassigned to the Headquarters of the 39th Bavarian Reserve Division (39. Kgl. Bayerische Reserve-Division) which was engaged in the Second Battle of the Masurian Lakes. It was here that he demonstrated considerable skill in driving on unmade roads in conditions of ice and snow. He remained with the regiment whilst it was involved in the offensive to drive the Russian army out of Lithuania.

Holleben was still anxious to be on active service, and since he was still technically a civilian, he was released from the Automobile Corps in early 1916. He reported to the Pilot Replacement Department (Fliegerersatzabteilung) in Großenhain but failed the medical due to poor eyesight. In April 1916, he was accepted into the Saxon Army 1st Field Artillery Regiment No. 12. Holleben was in training until October 1916 when, with the rank of gunner, he joined his regiment which was then fighting in the Battle of the Somme.

Initially he was deployed as a runner taking messages between the local headquarters, the gun emplacements and the infantry regiments they were providing artillery cover for. At Christmas 1916, he was promoted to Corporal (Unteroffizier), and two months later to 2nd Sergeant (Vizewachtmeiste).

In March 1917, the movement back to the Siegfried Line began. In April, the regiment took part in the Second Battle of the Aisne at which time Holleben’s primary duties were as an artillery observer and liaising with the infantry.

In December 1917, he received his promotion to Lieutenant of the Reserve (Leutnant d. R). In March 1918 he is listed as a Lieutenant with Battery No. 7, and in July 1918 as Ordnance Officer on the Regimental staff.

He was demobilized to the army reserve in January 1919.

== Awards 1914-1918 ==
Iron Cross 2nd Class, Iron Cross 1st Class., Friedrich-August Cross (class unknown), Albert Order 2nd Class (grade unknown).

== University education ==
Following demobilization, he resumed his studies, though this time it was to study chemistry at Royal Saxon Technical College on Bismarkplatz in Dresden (the building was destroyed by an American bombing raid in 1945); now the Dresden University of Technology. Holleben achieved good marks for his preliminary examination in October 1920.

One of the lecturers was Robert Luther (2 January 1868 – 17 April 1945) who had gained worldwide recognition for his lectures on the chemistry of photography and was someone with many contacts within the photographic industry; in 1909 the American photographer Imogen Cunningham came to Dresden to study under him.

Luther was the supervisor for Holleben's dissertation on "Drying of Gelatine" (Die Trocknung der Gelantine) for which he was awarded his Diplom-Ingenieur (Dipl.-Ing) in July 1922.

Holleben's doctorate referees were Luther and Alfred Lottermoser (17 July 1870 – 27 April 1945) known for his work on colloid chemistry (the science behind the Agfacolour colour screen). His thesis was "On the induced oxidation of dyes" (Ueber die induzierte Oxydation von Farbstoffen) for which he was awarded his certificate 16 July 1924.

== Agfacolor development ==
Agfa had manufactured colour photographic glass plates since 1916; unlike the rival Autochrome process (which was launched in 1907) which used grains of potato starch, dyed in the three primary colours, to form the colour screen (or reseau), Agfa used an emulsion in which were suspended particles of resin dyed in primary colours (Kornraster). Agfa had acquired the patent for this process in 1910 from the Danish patent holder J. H. Christensen.

He joined Agfa at their Berlin-Treptow site on 1 May 1925, and by 1926 he was head of the colour screen research group, overseeing development and production of Agfa-Farbenplatte colour glass plates. Following problems with the colour rendering of both green and blue, he changed the production to use alternative dyes and recommended using a Rapid Filter Yellow filter instead of a Tartrazine Yellow filter to improve blue rendition. Christensen continued the work begun by Holleben and in 1927 he proposed a new formulation and a switch from basic dyes to acidic dyes.

In 1928, plans were being drawn up to move the photographic production from Berlin-Treptow to its facility at Wolfen. Holleben was instrumental in the move; in 1930 he decided which buildings at Wolfen could be converted for production; in 1932 he was involved in discussions on how the move could be achieved without stopping production at Berlin-Treptow whilst still providing a continuous supply to customers. Holleben and the senior staff moved to Wolfen that month and were structurally integrated into the technical laboratories, and therefore subordinated to Dr. Wilmanns (the head of the Technical-Scientific Laboratory in Wolfen).

In Wolfen, development continued on improving the colour screen sensitivity and shrinking the grain size to allow the development of the next generation of products. Agfacolor, an additive colour film on a nitrocellulose film base producing a positive image was released in 1932, and in 1934 they released Agfacolor Ultra a faster film version of its predecessor, also on a nitrocellulose film base, which was later changed to a safer acetyl cellulose film base.

In 1936, colour screens were made redundant when Agfa developed the ground-breaking Agfacolor Neu process. This was a multi-layer colour reversal film with the colour couplers incorporated into three separate emulsion layers coated onto a single 'support' that could be processed in a single colour developer (it was a rival to the Kodachrome reversal film released in 1935). As a result, work on the work on raster screen plates and films reduced; he therefore also worked in the X-ray film factory.

Holleben was part of the research team trialing the new film at the Garmisch-Partenkirchen 1936 Winter Olympics, where he photographed much of the event (though the film was not yet fast enough to capture live action).

As the dominance of the multi-layer colour film increased, he was by 1939 working in the test centre, and no longer involved in research.

== Patents ==
Professor Luther and Holleben were jointly awarded a patent (396,485) on 8 May 1923 for a "Process for forming direct and reverse dye images". This work was relevant to the Gasparcolor process and was quoted by Dr Béla Gáspár in his 1934 American patent (1,985,344) for a "Method of producing multicolour photographs and cinematograph pictures".

Holleben was awarded German patent number 545,745 on 4 March 1932 titled "Unexposed and undeveloped colored layers for photographic purposes".

Holleben and Dr Wilhelm Schneider (31 December 1900 – 2 August 1980) were awarded German patent number 2724 on 10 January 1936 titled "Process for producing color images with sound track".

Holleben, and a Wolfen colleague Wolf Rodenbacker, were awarded US patent number 2,086,930 on 13 July 1937 titled "Cassette for photographic films".

Holleben was awarded German patent number 762,767 on 9 July 1941 titled "Photographic tone separation process".

== Membership of the Sturmabteilung (SA) ==
Kurt, like many veterans of the 1914-1918 war, was a member of the veteran's association 'The Steel Helmet, League of Front-Line Soldiers' (Der Stahlhelm, Bund der Frontsoldaten). When it began, it was both a mutual aid society for old comrades and a political combat group; just one of many that sprung up in the 1920's. Membership increased and it became one of the largest paramilitary organizations in Germany. However nationalist elements infiltrated the organization resulting in it becoming more political, and more radical. The Nazi government came to see them as a threat, and so in 1934 it was dissolved and its entire membership, including Holleben, was transferred to the Nazi controlled Sturmabteilung (also known as 'Storm Troopers', or 'Brown shirts'). Holleben held the rank of Rottenführer, which was equivalent to that of a Corporal in the army, and as such would have responsibility for a section of up to seven men.

== Military service 1939 – 1945 ==
Following several absences from Agfa to attend military exercises, he was finally drafted into the military on 10 August 1939. He joined a Flak Regiment (Reserve-Flak-Abteilung 132) with the rank of Second Lieutenant. He was quickly promoted First Lieutenant and became a battery commander with the rank of Captain.

In May 1940 he transferred to the Luftwaffe High Command Personnel Department at the Air Ministry (Reichsluftfahrtministerium) in Berlin, where he performed administrative work in the Officers Office.

He was promoted Major and in May 1942 transferred to Leipzig as a Military District Officer at the Leipzig Replacement Army headquarters (Wehrersatzinspektion) sub-district command (Wehrbezirkskommando) Leipzig I which was responsible for the "conscription, training and replacement of personnel including control of mobilization policies and the actual call-up and induction of men; all types of military training, including the selection and schooling of officers and non-commissioned officers; the dispatch of personnel replacements to field units in response to their requisitions; and the organization of new units".

On 16 September 1943 Holleben was admitted to the military hospital in Bad Mergentheim suffering from Hepatitis, he remained there until 14 October before returning to his duties in Leipzig.

== Opposition to race laws ==
Holleben stated that he only joined the Nazi Party (membership number 4945340) in May 1937, because he was 'invited' to do so. He had a number of Jewish friends; including Dr Fritz Luft, a young chemist, who also worked at the Agfa Bitterfeld site. As both Holleben and Luft lived in Leipzig, twenty five miles from the site, Holleben would give Luft a lift to work. This car share became an issue with the local Nazi Party, and they ordered Holleben to wear his SA (Sturmabteilung) uniform to work. He obeyed the order, but continued to drive Luft to work. This brought Holleben into conflict with the local Nazi Party, which earned him a severe rebuke and sanctions, such as being prevented from giving lectures on colour photography in Bitterfeld. Fritz Luft then left Agfa and managed to escape to Argentina in 1938.

== Prisoner of War ==
Holleben was arrested in Leipzig on 26 April 1945 by the occupying American forces. It was some nine weeks after his arrest that he arrived at Camp Zimming (Continental Central Prisoner of War Enclosure No. 27), in the Moselle Department of North East France. Though named for the commune of Zimming, it was actually situated some 6 miles away, outside of a town named Longeville-lès-Saint-Avold. The camp at this time held some 17,000 prisoners; according to reports the conditions were very poor, but his records show that he lost only 1 lb in weight during captivity. The records also show that whilst there he was vaccinated for Cholera and Typhus, and he had operation on his left leg. Holleben left the camp on 15 January 1946, and was to be taken to Camp Cappel (Disarmed Enemy Forces Enclosure #15 (DEFE#15)) in Marburg. His entry into the camp was delayed because he was suffering from Enterocolitis, and he was first taken to the military hospital which was situated in the Deaconess Mother House in the Wehrda district in the north of the city. He was released from hospital on 15 February 1946. He finally got his freedom on 28 February 1946 and went to live in the Marbach district of Marburg (Leipzig was now in the Soviet zone).

== Personal life ==
Holleben married Marie-Therese Henriette Margit Stark (25 May 1898 - ) on 20 August 1922 they were divorced on 14 November 1927 (in 1929 she married Generalleutnant Karl Rübel).

Holleben was the professional guardian (Berufsvormundschaft) of Herbert Meinecke (22 August 1916 – 20 October 2011); this role came about due to the large number of orphaned children, and fatherless families created by the 1914-1918 conflict. Today we would think of this as being a mentor, and a guide for the young person. Hollben sometimes took him travelling with him, and on a prisoner of war form referred to Herbert as his foster son (Pflegsohn).

He enjoyed travelling, sailing, skiing, ice skating and was a keen swimmer.

== Death ==
Following his release from American captivity in March 1946, he wrote to Agfa from Marburg in the hope of returning to work, but the Bitterfeld-Wolfen site was now in Soviet occupied territory making that impossible, so he started a new life as a lecturer at the Marburg adult education center (Volkshochschule). Holleben died in the Wehrda auxiliary hospital on 14 January 1947, of spinal poliomyelitis.

== Legacy ==
In 1935, Holleben wrote a book on how to use Agfacolour films (Farbenfotografie mit Agfacolor-Ultra-Filmen und Agfacolor-Platten published by Heering of Harzburg).

The Handbuch der Medizinischen Radiologie 1967, refers to (an untraced) "VON HOLLEBEN, K,: A method for checking the sharpness of the Rontgen films, applied to the Agfa-Accurata film test. Rontgen practice, 7: 558, 1935"

Holleben had access to as many photographic plates as he wished and photographed his extensive travels throughout Germany, Europe, Scandinavia and North Africa. He left a photographic archive of some six hundred 9x12 cm Agfa-Farbenplatte glass plates covering the period 1924 to 1939, and several hundred slides covering the period 1932 to 1940, which are now in the Victoria and Albert Museum.

The Victoria and Albert Museum Photography Department has an illustrated privately printed biography of Kurt von Holleben.
