= Von Holleben =

Von Holleben is a German surname. Holleben is since 2005 part of Teutschenthal. Notable people with the surname include:

- Jan von Holleben (born 1977), German photographer
- Kurt von Holleben (1894–1947), German chemist
- Theodor von Holleben (1838–1913), German diplomat
