= Arnold Lequis =

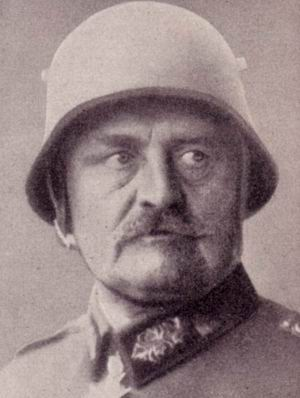
- Born: February 2, 1861; Dillenburg, Lahn-Dill-Kreis, Hesse-Darmstadt
- Died: February 16, 1949 (aged 88); Wiesbaden, Hesse, Allied-occupied Germany
- Education: Polytechnische Hochschule
- Military career
- Allegiance: German Empire: Imperial Colonial Office; Weimar Republic
- Branch: Imperial German Army; Schutztruppe; Reichsheer
- Service years: 1880 – 1920
- Rank: General of the Infantry
- Commands: 12th Division
- Conflicts: Boxer Rebellion; Herero Wars; World War I: Italian front; Battle of Caporetto; German spring offensive; German Revolution of 1918–19: 1918 Christmas crisis

Arnold Lequis (February 2, 1861 – February 16, 1949) was a German General of the Infantry who commanded the 12th Division during World War I as well as a commander of the Reichswehr during the German Revolution of 1918–19 against the Communists.

== Early military career ==
Lequis attended high school in Osnabrück and Cologne and the Polytechnische Hochschule in Aachen. In 1880, he joined the 8th Pioneer Battalion of the Prussian Army as a fahnenjunker and was promoted to second lieutenant in 1881. By 1896 he was promoted to captain on the general staff. In 1898 he was commanded to the German General Staff and in 1902 worked as a military instructor at the Prussian Staff College.

== Service in the German Colonies ==
In 1900, Lequis took part in the Boxer Rebellion as a company commander in the East Asian Engineer Battalion. In 1904, he was on the general staff of the Legen Command in the colony of German South West Africa during the Herero Wars. In December 1904, when the Baltic Fleet anchored off Lüderitz on its way to Japan, Lequis, despite the tense situation after the Dogger Bank Incident, managed to reach an agreement with the Russian Admiral Zinovy Rozhestvensky. After a temporary position in the general staff of the governorate of Metz, he retired from the Imperial German Army and was employed on January 11, 1908, in the command of the Schutztruppe in the Imperial Colonial Office. In 1909 he was put in charge of deputizing for the commander of the Kaiserliche Schutztruppe for Kamerun under Major Harry Puder. He was also tasked with finding out about the shattered conditions of the officer corps of the Schutztruppe. He undertook an extensive inspection tour of western Cameroon and the inland forests of the coast of Kribi. In May 1909, he was promoted to lieutenant colonel but then he caused an uproar when he resigned his command without consultation and refused to serve under the lower-ranking deputy governor Wilhelm Peter Hansen. Lequis rejoined the Prussian army without the affair having any adverse consequences for him.

== World War I and the German Revolution ==
In 1910 Lequis became Chief of Staff of the Thorn Governorate and promoted to Colonel in 1912 and Commander of the Engineers of the I Army Corps in 1913. During World War I, he was initially chief of the general staff of the governorate of Poznań and from October 1914, he was chief quartermaster of the 2nd Army and in December 1914, he was promoted to major general. In May 1916 he was appointed commander of the 104th Infantry Brigade and in November of the same year he took charge of the 12th Division. In 1917 he was awarded the Pour le Mérite and, after successfully participating in the Battle of Caporetto, was awarded the Pour le Mérite with Oak Leaves. In March 1918 he took part in the German spring offensive with his division and was promoted to lieutenant general in July. He was then made governor of Metz before returning to Berlin after the Armistice of 11 November 1918 was signed.

=== German Revolution ===
During the November Revolution, Lequis received the command of a general command named after him, with which he was supposed to restore order in Berlin within the OHL before the start of the Reich Congress of Workers' and Soldiers' Councils. However, the plans drawn up by Lequis and his chief of staff, Major Bodo von Harbou, for the front-line troops, including many Guards regiments, to enter Berlin were not carried out as planned or failed because most of the soldiers were striving to go home. During the invasion of Steglitz, Lequis was sworn into the Weimar Republic by the government of Friedrich Ebert on behalf of his officers and men and temporarily acted as a military governance from Berlin.

Lequis gained importance during the 1918 Christmas crisis where troops of the Volksmarinedivision billeted in the Berlin Palace and in the Marstall in Berlin at Christmas 1918. Lequis was entrusted with the Guards Cavalry Rifle Division to secure the government district. The sailors of the Volksmarinedivision intended to make the agreed handover of the castle to the government dependent on the payment of their wages, which were currently refused. On the morning of December 24, 1918, the castle and stables were opened fire upon by the troops of Lequis with military equipment. However, due to the support of the civilian population that had flocked to the area, the troops had to withdraw again. After Lequis gave a thoughtless newspaper interview after the crisis was settled, he was replaced by General Freiherr von Lüttwitz and promoted to an officer. On June 23, 1919, he was taken over by the Provisional Reichswehr as leader of Reichswehr Brigade 8 in Upper Silesia and put in charge of border protection. After the Kapp Putsch, Lequis retired from military service on September 18, 1920. Three months later he was given the rank of General of the Infantry.
