= Right Opposition =

1928–1930 faction of the Soviet Communist Party

Right Opposition Правая оппозиция
- Leader: Nikolai Bukharin; Alexei Rykov
- Founded: 1924
- Dissolved: 1930
- Ideology: Marxism; Bukharinism; Socialism in one country; Market socialism (pro-NEP); Anti-Stalinism (after 1928); Anti-collectivization
- Political position: Left-wing to far-left Within the Communist Party: Right-wing
- National affiliation: Soviet Communist Party
- International affiliation: International Communist Opposition

The Right Opposition (Note: Russian: Правая оппозиция, romanized: Pravaya oppozitsiya) or Right Tendency (Note: Правый уклон, Praviy uklon) in the All-Union Communist Party (Bolsheviks) was a label formulated by Joseph Stalin in Autumn of 1928 for the opposition against certain measures included within the first five-year plan, an opposition which was led by Nikolai Bukharin, Alexei Rykov, Mikhail Tomsky, and their supporters within the Soviet Union that did not follow the so-called "general line of the party".

It is also the name given to "right-wing" critics within the Communist movement internationally, particularly those who coalesced in the International Communist Opposition, regardless of whether they identified with Bukharin and Rykov.

== Emergence ==
The struggle for power in the Soviet Union after the death of Vladimir Lenin saw the development of three major tendencies within the Communist Party. These were described by Leon Trotsky as left, right, and centre tendencies, each based on a specific class or caste. Trotsky argued that his tendency, the Left Opposition, represented the internationalist traditions of the working class. The tendency led by Joseph Stalin was described as being in the centre, based on the state and party bureaucracy, tending to shift alliances between the left and the right.

"He is an unprincipled intriguer, who subordinates everything to the preservation of his own power. He changes his theory according to whom he needs to get rid of." — Bukharin on Stalin's theoretical position, 1928

The right tendency was identified with the supporters of Nikolai Bukharin and Rykov. It was asserted that they represented the influence of the peasantry and the danger of capitalist restoration. Their policy was closely identified with the New Economic Policy (NEP), with former left communist Bukharin slowly moving to the right of the Bolshevik Party and becoming a strong supporter of the NEP starting in 1921. Right Opposition policies encouraging kulaks and NEPmen to "get rich" were seen by Right Opposition supporters as encouraging kulaks and NEPmen to "grow into" socialism.

Robert J. Alexander has questioned whether the various Right Oppositions could be described as a single international tendency, since they were usually concerned only with the issues relevant for their own countries and their own communist parties. Therefore, the Right Opposition was far more fragmented than the Left Opposition. Nevertheless, the various Right Opposition groups did come together to form an International Communist Opposition (ICO). Unlike the Left Opposition, they did not tend to form separate parties as they considered themselves loyal to the Communist International (Comintern).

== Fate of the Russian Right Opposition ==
Stalin and his "centre" faction were allied with Bukharin and the Right Opposition from late 1924, with Bukharin elaborating Stalin's theory of socialism in one country. Together, they expelled Trotsky, Kamenev, Zinoviev, and the United Opposition from the Communist Party in December 1927. However, once Trotsky was out of the way and the Left Opposition had been illegalized, Stalin soon became alarmed at the danger posed to the Soviet state by the rising power of the capitalistic kulaks and NEPmen, who had become emboldened by the Left Opposition's illegalization. Sensing this danger, Stalin then turned on his Right Opposition allies. Bukharin and the Right Opposition were, in their turn, sidelined and removed from important positions within the Communist Party and the Soviet government from 1928 to 1930, with Stalin ending the NEP and beginning the first five-year plan.

One of the last attempts of the Rightists to resist Stalin was the Ryutin affair in 1932, where a manifesto against the soviet policy of collectivization and Stalin was circulated. It openly called for "The Liquidation of the dictatorship of Stalin and his clique". Later, some rightists joined a secret bloc with Leon Trotsky, Grigory Zinoviev, and Lev Kamenev in order to oppose Stalin. Historian Pierre Broué stated that it dissolved in early 1933.

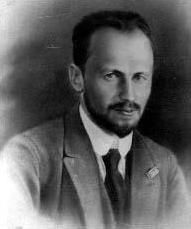
A young Nikolai Bukharin, whose ideas formed the ideological framework of the Opposition.

Bukharin was isolated from his allies abroad, and, in the face of increasing Stalinist repression, was unable to mount a sustained struggle against Stalin. Unlike Trotsky, who built an anti-Stalinist movement, Bukharin and his allies capitulated to Stalin and admitted their "ideological errors". They were temporarily rehabilitated, though they were allowed only minor posts and did not return to their former prominence. Bukharin and his allies were later executed during the Great Purge trials.

== Foundation of the International Communist Opposition ==
The various right oppositional groups loosely aligned with Bukharin within the Comintern were forced to form their own organisations when they were, in their turn, purged from the national sections of the Comintern. In Europe, the most important and substantial of these new organisations was the Communist Party Opposition (KPO) in Germany, led by Heinrich Brandler. In the United States, Jay Lovestone, Bertram Wolfe, and their supporters founded the Communist Party (Opposition) and published the newspaper Workers Age. In Canada, the Marxian Educational League was formed as part of Lovestone's CP(O), and it became affiliated with the Co-operative Commonwealth Federation. However, by the end of 1939, both the Toronto and Montreal groups of this organization had ceased to function.

In a few places, communist groups affiliated with the ICO achieved more success than the Comintern-affiliated organizations. For example, in Sweden, the Socialist Party of Karl Kilbom and Nils Flyg, affiliated with the ICO, received 5.7% of the vote in the 1932 elections to the Riksdag, outpolling the Comintern section that received 3.9%.

In Catalonia, Spain, the ICO-affiliated Bloc Obrer i Camperol (BOC), led by Joaquín Maurín, was for a time larger and more important than the official Spanish Communist Party. Later, the BOC merged with Andrés Nin's Izquierda Comunista in 1935 to form the Workers' Party of Marxist Unification (POUM) which was to be a major party backing the Second Spanish Republic in the Spanish Civil War. Maurín became general secretary of the POUM but was arrested early in the civil war. As a result, Nin, a former Trotskyist, became the POUM's new leader.

In all, the ICO had member parties in fifteen countries during the 1930s. However, the ICO and its affiliates did not consider themselves a new international, but a "faction" that was involuntarily excluded from the Comintern and that was anxious to return to it if only the Comintern would change its policies and allow ICO members the freedom to advocate their positions.

Despite being identified with Bukharin, the ICO generally supported Stalin's economic policies (which Bukharin opposed), such as the five-year plans to achieve rapid industrialization, and the collectivization of agriculture. Furthermore, they even supported the early Moscow trials. Their main difference with Stalin and the Comintern was over the issue of democracy within the Communist International and the influence of the CPSU in the Comintern and its sections, and over Stalin's international policy, particularly the Third Period and the subsequent popular front policies.

In addition, as the Moscow trials entered their second phase and turned against Bukharin and his supporters, disputes broke out within the ICO regarding whether there was any point in continuing with the concept of being an opposition within the communist movement rather than openly create a new international rival to the Comintern, as Trotsky did with his Fourth International.

== End of the Right Opposition ==
The ICO began to disintegrate in 1933. With the coming to power of the Nazis, the German party had to go underground and establish an exile branch in Paris. Paris was also the new home of the international ICO headquarters, which became dominated by the Germans. The Norwegian and Swedish groups left later that year to join the new "centrist" International Buro for Revolutionary Socialist Unity (or London Bureau) established in Paris that August. The Czechoslovak affiliate was weakened by the defection of its Czech members in December, making the party a largely Sudeten German group at a time when that community was becoming increasingly attracted to the Nazis. The Austrian group had to go underground after the Dollfuss putsch of March 1934, and the majority of the Alsatian section was expelled that summer for its pro-Nazi sympathies. The Swiss affiliate went over to the Social Democrats in 1936, and M. N. Roy took his Indian group out in 1937. Furthermore, the suppression of POUM in May 1937 and the execution of Bukharin and other "rights" in the Soviet Union had convinced many that the Communist International could not be reformed and the idea of being an "opposition" within it was untenable.

At a conference in February 1938, the International Communist Opposition affiliated with the London Bureau. This led to some confusion as to whether affiliates of the ICO were also affiliates of the London Bureau as organizations themselves. To straighten out this overlapping another conference was held in Paris in April 1939 which dissolved both entities into a new organization, the International Revolutionary Marxist Centre, to be headquartered in Paris. Membership in the new group was quickly ratified by the ILLA, the KPO, POUM, PSOP, the ILP, and the Archeio-Marxists. It ceased to exist after the fall of France.

A few groups continue the tradition of this current today. The Gruppe Arbeiterpolitik in Germany is one such group.

== Meetings ==
- The first gathering of the opposition communists was held in Berlin March 17–19, 1930. It was attended by the oppositions of Germany, Czechoslovakia, Sweden, and by M. N. Roy. The meeting decided to set up an information center in Berlin to co-ordinate international activities and publish a bulletin, International Information of the Communist Opposition, which had previously been published by the KPO.
- The first official conference of the ICO was held in Berlin in December 1930. It was attended by representatives from Germany, Alsace, Sweden, the United States, Switzerland, and Norway, with letters from sympathizers in Austria, Finland, Italy and Canada. Adopts the "Platform of the International Communist Opposition"
- The second official congress was held in Berlin, July 2–5, 1932, attended by representatives from Germany, Switzerland, Norway, Sweden, Spain, and the US.
- An "enlarged session of the Bureau" was held in July 1933 to discuss the Nazi triumph in Germany and the Paris conference of "centrist" groups. Attended by representatives from Germany, France, Switzerland, the Netherlands and the US. The Norwegians and Swedes did not attend, as they favored participation in the Paris conference. The ICO itself declined invitation to the conference. ICO headquarters moved to Paris.

== Groups associated with the ICO ==
=== Germany ===
The Gruppe Arbeiterpolitik, founded by Heinrich Brandler, is effectively a successor organisation.

=== Austria ===
The Communist Opposition of Austria was established in late 1929 when the politburo of the official Communist Party of Austria expelled Willi Schlamm, A. Reisinger, Joseph Klein, and Richard Vovesny. They had their own periodical, Der Neue Mahnruf until the Dolfuss dictatorship came to power in 1934. Jay Lovestone happened to be in Austria at the time of the anchluss in early March 1938 at the invitation of a group called Der Funke and was able to arrange eight fake passports for eight leaders of the Austrian opposition. They left Vienna on March 14, the day before Hitler arrived in the city. Schlamm later edited a paper for Austrian exiles in Prague, Weltbühne, then emigrated to the US.

=== Hungary ===
An Opposition group was established in Hungary in 1932. At that time the Hungarian Communist Party was already an underground movement, and the opposition claimed about 10% of its membership.

=== Poland ===
While never a formal organization, there was a tendency within the Polish Communist Party usually known as the "three Ws" after the leaders: Adolf Warski, Henryk Walecki, and Maria Koszutska (pseudonym Wera Kostrzewa). As the Party was already underground in Poland, and the communists already weak the group decided not to create a formal organization, though they were often depicted as followers of Brandler and August Thalheimer by the leadership. All three died in gulags.

=== Switzerland ===
In Switzerland, the official Communist Party's leader, Jules Humbert-Droz, was sympathetic to the Right Opposition, and because of that lost his powerful position in the Comintern. Later, he self-criticized and capitulated to the Communist leadership, only to be expelled in 1943. One cantonal section of the Swiss Communist Party, in Schaffhausen, did secede and form a communist opposition group. For a while, it was quite successful, dominating the local labor movement, especially among tool and watchmakers. In the 20 October 1933 elections, the CPO elected 10 of the 30 local councilors and CPO leader Walther Bringolf was chosen as mayor. By 1936, the CPO had merged with the Swiss Socialist Party.

=== Italy ===
There was some resistance in the Italian party to the new Third Period line. At first the two Italian ECCI members, Palmiro Togliatti and Angelo Tasca, opposed the Comintern's actions with regard to the German party. However, at the Tenth Plenum in June 1929, Togliatti capitulated to Stalin's wishes while Tasca was expelled. Later, at a May 1930 plenum of the Party, Politburo members Pasquini and Santini were removed for opposing the Third Period and "organizational measures" were taken against lower cadres.

=== Denmark ===
A Danish Opposition group was founded in 1933. It lasted at least until February 1938 when its representative attended the ICO unity conference with the London Bureau.

=== France ===
In France the initial purge of the Communist Party in 1929 took mayors or city councilors from Clichy, Auffay, Saint-Denis, Pierrefitte-sur-Seine, Villetaneuse and Paris. The party's general secretary and the editor of L'Humanité were also demoted. However, not all of the expelled necessarily adhered to the ICOs positions; the Parisian councilors, for instance, formed their own party, Workers and Peasants Party, which in turn joined the Party of Proletarian Unity in December 1930. The small national Opposition group joined the expelled Seine Federation of the SFIO in 1938 to form the Workers and Peasants' Socialist Party.

==== Alsace ====
A separate ICO party, the Opposition Communist Party of Alsace-Lorraine (KPO), was created in Alsace. The Alsatian KPO campaigned for autonomy for Alsace, and formed an alliance with clerical autonomist. The Alsatian KPO was led by Charles Hueber (mayor of Strasbourg, 1929–1935) and Jean-Pierre Mourer (member of the French National Assembly). It ran a daily newspaper of its own, Die Neue Welt. The Alsatian KPO gradually moved towards pro-Nazi positions, and was expelled from ICO in 1934. A small group remained loyal to the ICO and published a weekly, Arbeiter Politik, but had little influence.

=== United Kingdom ===
During most of its history the right Opposition in the United Kingdom was represented principally within the Independent Labour Party. Oppositionists joined the Revolutionary Policy Committee, part of which represented their line within the ILP. An independent Opposition group was formed in 1935, but had little influence. By 1938 the line of the ICO had turned towards the "centrist" position of the ILP leadership under Fenner Brockway and the work of independent factions within the party became less tenable.

=== India ===
The leading Indian communist M. N. Roy was an early and outspoken supporter of the Right Opposition. While he never had more than a marginal following, he wielded extraordinary influence on the left wing of the Indian National Congress and played an instrumental role in the election of Subhas Chandra Bose to the leadership of Congress. However, after Bose split with Congress and formed the All India Forward Bloc, Roy sharply diverged to the point where he even came to oppose the Congress-led Quit India campaign. The split between Bose and Roy was in many ways analogous to the American split between Bertram Wolfe and Jay Lovestone.

=== Argentina ===
While never an official member of the ICO, a Right Oppositionist group led by José Penelon split from the Communist Party of Argentina in 1928. Penelon's group formed the Partido Comunista de Region Argentina ("Communist Party of the Argentine Region"), which was later renamed the Partido Concentracion Obrera ("Labour Gathering Party"). It merged with the Social Democrats in 1971.

=== Mexico ===
The Marxist Workers Bloc of Mexico was founded in early 1937. It published a few issues of a newspaper called La Batalla (after POUM's journal) and announced its adherence to the ICO. It was never heard from again.

== See also ==
- Moscow trials
- Capitalist roader
