= Marxist Workers Bloc of Mexico =

Marxist Workers Bloc of Mexico Bloque Obrero Marxista de México
- General Secretary: Gustavo de Anda
- Founded: 1937
- Newspaper: La Batalla
- Ideology: Communism; Bukharinism
- International affiliation: International Communist Opposition

The Marxist Workers Bloc of Mexico (Spanish: Bloque Obrero Marxista de México) was a communist political organization in Mexico. The organization was founded in 1937. Gustavo de Anda was the general secretary of the movement. The organization published La Batalla, named after the Spanish POUM publication by the same name.

The organization called for critical support to the Lázaro Cárdenas del Río government against what it described as 'reactionary' sectors, but at the same time arguing for organizing workers and peasants in struggle against government control.

The Marxist Workers Bloc was the sole group in Latin America with a formal link to the International Communist Opposition.

La Batalla covered events related to the Independent Labour Party in Great Britain and POUM in Spain. The party also stated to be inspired by the Communist Party of Germany (Opposition).
