= Independent Regional Party for Alsace–Lorraine =

Political party in France

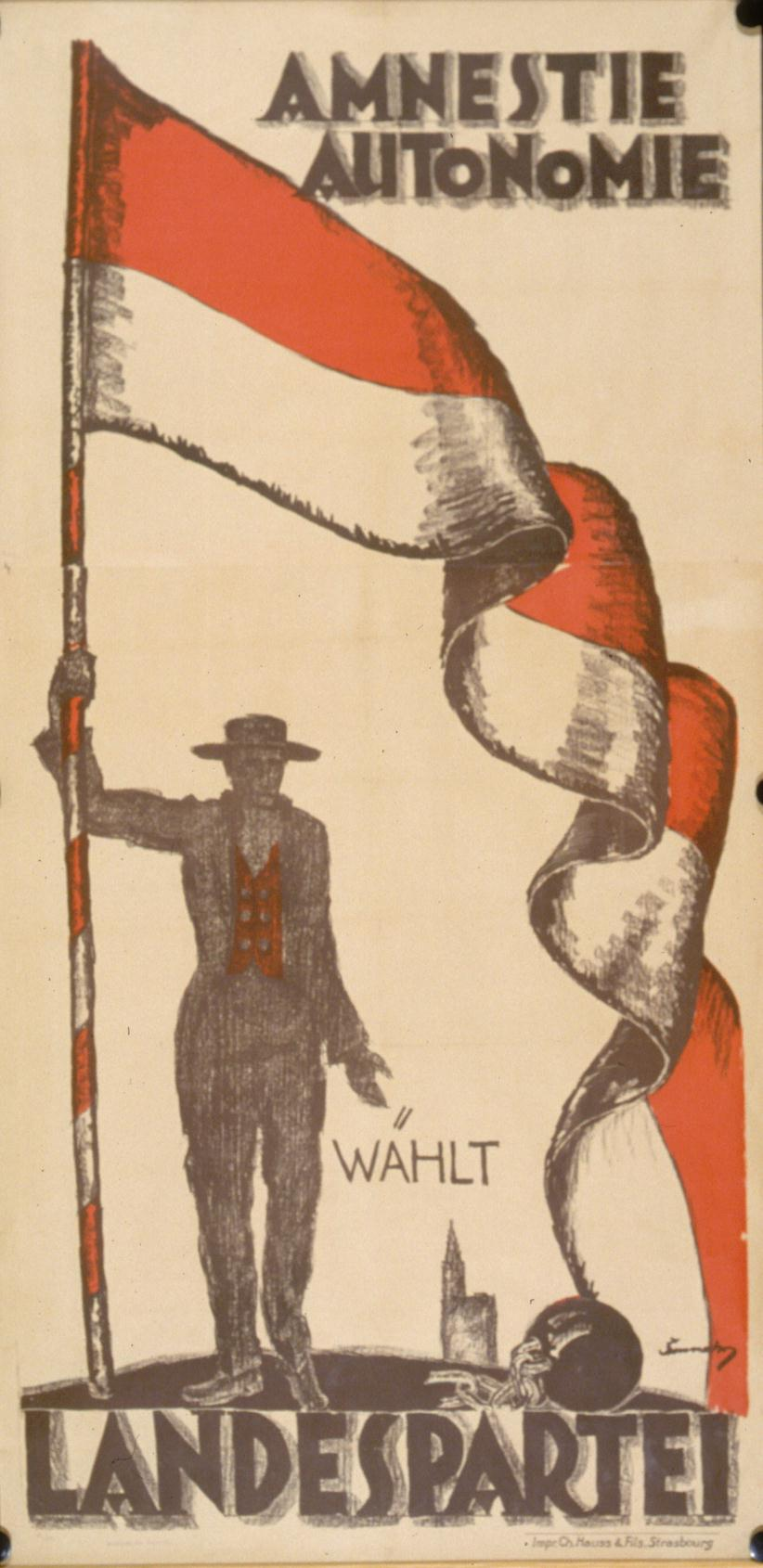
Landespartei electoral poster

The Independent Regional Party for Alsace–Lorraine (German: Unabhängige Landespartei für Elsaß-Lothringen, colloquially simply referred to as Landespartei) was a political party in Alsace, France. The party was founded by a group of key supporters of the publication Die Zukunft. The Landespartei represented the radical fringe of the broader Alsatian autonomist movement.

The founding meeting of the Landespartei took place in the Restaurant A l'Abattoir in Strasbourg in September 1927. Around 300 persons attended the founding meeting. The meeting was led by Paul Schall, René Hauss and Karl Roos. A programme of German linguistic demands was formulated, largely on the pattern of the Heimatbund.

In the 1928 parliamentary election Landespartei obtained 11.5% of the votes in Lower Alsace (the French département of Bas-Rhin).

In 1928 the Landespartei joined the Volksfront, a coalition of Alsatian political parties favouring autonomy for the region.

In the 1929 municipal election in Strasbourg, the party won five seats and became part of the ruling majority in the city council. The party lost one of its seats in the subsequent 1935 municipal election, in which the autonomist side lost its majority.

The Landespartei gradually moved closer to fascism. Its new publication, Die Elsaß–Lothringische Zeitung often praised Adolf Hitler and Benito Mussolini. Moreover, splinter-groups of the party began forming uniformed combat groups styled after the SA.

In April 1939 the erstwhile communist newspaper Die Neue Welt was merged into Elsass-Lothringische Zeitung. In July 1939, the Alsatian Workers and Peasants Party (which had published Die Neue Welt) merged into the Landespartei.
