= KJO =

KJO, KJo, or kjo can refer to:

- Communist Youth of Austria, Austrian youth organization
- Karan Johar (born 1972), Indian filmmaker and television personality
- King James Only movement
- KKJO-FM, contemporary hit radio station in St. Joseph, Missouri, U.S.
- Korean Journal of Ophthalmology
- Kotla Jam railway station, in Punjab, Pakistan
- Pahari Kinnauri language, Indo-Aryan language spoken in Himachal Pradesh, India
- Young Communist League of Germany (Opposition), former youth organization in 1930s Germany
