= Alsatian Workers and Peasants Party =

Alsatian Workers and Peasants Party Elsässische Arbeiter- und Bauernpartei
- Leader: Charles Hueber, Jean-Pierre Mourer
- Founded: October 1929
- Dissolved: July 1939
- Split from: French Communist Party
- Merged into: Landespartei
- Newspaper: Die Neue Welt
- Membership (1932): 1,300
- Ideology: Communism; Alsatian autonomism
- International affiliation: International Communist Opposition (–1934)
- Coalition: Volksfront
- National Assembly: 1 / 607

The Alsatian Workers and Peasants Party (German: Elsässische Arbeiter- und Bauernpartei; French: Parti alsacien ouvrier et paysan), initially the Opposition Communist Party of Alsace-Lorraine (German: Kommunistische Partei-Opposition, abbreviated KPO; French: Parti communiste d'opposition d'Alsace-Lorraine), was a political party in Alsace-Lorraine. The party was led by Jean-Pierre Mourer and Charles Hueber. The party was founded in late October 1929 and was a member of the International Communist Opposition until it was expelled from that organisation in 1934 and gradually moved towards pro-Nazi positions.

== Split from French Communist Party ==
The party emerged from a split in the Alsatian federation of the French Communist Party (PCF). The split had been preceded by an unorthodox coalition in the Strasbourg municipal elections of May 1929 in which local communists had formed an alliance with clerical and autonomist forces. In a June 1929 municipal by-election, the group around Charles Hueber supported a right-wing autonomist candidate against an official PCF candidate. The Strasbourg communists had also revived the newspaper Die Neue Welt, which had been closed down in 1923, as an alternative to l'Humanité d'Alsace-Lorraine. The expulsions from the PCF came two weeks after the revival of Die Neue Welt.

In October 1929, the expelled group around Hueber and Mourer founded the Opposition Communist Party. The new party had at the time of its foundation, the mayor of Strasbourg, Charles Hueber, and was supported by the majority of the municipal council. Jean-Pierre Mourer represented the party in the French National Assembly and was re-elected to the National Assembly in 1932 and 1936.

The party had a difficult relationship with the PCF, which often disrupted KPO meetings.

== Rise of fascism ==
For the party, the rise of fascism in Europe complicated its political development. The party conceptualized fascism as largely synonymous to centralism and compared the Italization of South Tyrol with Frenchification of Alsace. The party also criticised German Nazism, but from 1933 to 1936, the group around Hueber gradually moved towards pro-Nazi positions.

After Adolf Hitler came to power in Germany, refugees belonging to the Communist Party of Germany (Opposition) (KPDO) began to arrive in Alsace. The Alsatian KPO was in solidarity with the KPDO refugees and aided them in finding work. Even after the KPDO foreign committee had shifted from Strasbourg to Paris, many KPDO cadres remained in Alsace and became active members of the Alsatian KPO. The editorial line of Die Neue Welt was clearly marked by the influence of KPDO refugees, who promoted positions that were more clearly antifascist positions. That eventually clashed with the autonomist aspirations of Alsatian cadres and led to a split in 1934. The party expelled the refugee group, which retaliated by expelling the party from the International Communist Opposition.

In September 1935, the name "Alsatian Workers and Peasants Party" was adopted, and autonomism was confirmed as the party's primary ideological position. Die Neue Welt was frequently quoted in the German media as expressing the feelings of the Alsatian people.

Die Neue Welt and Elsass-Lothringissche Zeitung (the organ of the Landespartei) were merged in April 1939. In July 1939, the party merged with the Autonomist Landespartei.

== Membership ==
As of 1932, the party had around 1,300 members, primarily concentrated in Bas-Rhin. Membership declined from then onwards, and by 1935, only a few hundred members had remained.
