= Das Volksrecht (Offenbach am Main) =

German left-wing newspaper (1925-33)

- Type: Irregular (1925–1928), Weekly (1928–1933)
- Founded: 1925
- Ceased publication: February 1933
- Political alignment: Communist Party of Germany (1925–1928); Communist Party of Germany (Opposition) (1928–1932); Socialist Workers Party of Germany (1932–1933)
- Language: German language
- Headquarters: Offenbach am Main

Das Volksrecht ('The People's Right') was a left-wing newspaper published from Offenbach am Main, Weimar Germany between 1925 and 1933. Initially it was an irregular publication of the communist city council group, but in 1928 it became a local mouthpiece of the Right Opposition. It was published on a weekly basis until the National Socialist takeover in 1933.

== KPD organ ==
From 1925 to 1928 Das Volksrecht was published irregularly, with 6–8 issues per year. It was issued by the faction of the Communist Party of Germany (KPD) in the Offenbach am Main city council. The printing was done at the Peuvag branch in Frankfurt am Main. It was sold by KPD cadres at a price of ten pfennig. Heinrich Galm, the leader of the KPD in the Hessen landtag (regional parliament) was listed as the legal publisher of the newspaper.

== Mouthpiece of the Right Opposition ==
Along with Gegen den Strom, Das Volksrecht would become one of the first KPD organs to become identified with the Right Opposition. In the fall of 1928 Galm revived Das Volksrecht as a more regular publication with a larger circulation. In the second number issued after this revival, Galm launched an open attack against Ernst Thälmann and the central leadership of KPD. This move caused dissident inside the Offenbach am Main branch of the party, and Galm was accused of deliberately having fomented a split in the party through the revival of Das Volksrecht.

== KPD(O) organ ==
In November 1928 the newspaper was converted into a weekly, and became the "organ of the Communist Party of Germany (Opposition) [KPD(O)] Hessen-Frankfurt". Editors of the newspaper (at different times) included Alwin Heucke (the KPD(O) party secretary in Hesse) Wilhelm Berker, Heinz Möller and Philipp Pless. It carried the by-line 'Organ for Party, Trade Unions and Municipal Politics'. The leader of KPD(O) in the city council, Heinrich Galm, would issue sharp attacks against SPD in the pages of Das Volksrecht.

In 1929 a local edition in Stuttgart, Arbeitertribüne ('Workers Tribune'), was launched with Richard Janus as its editor.

The exiled Indian revolutionary M.N. Roy wrote for Das Volksrecht, under the pseudonym 'Richard'.

== SAPD organ ==
In April 1932 the Offenbach am Main branch of KPD(O) left the party and joined the Socialist Workers Party of Germany (SAPD) instead. Subsequently Das Volksrecht became the local organ for the SAPD in the city. The newspaper continued to be published as a weekly until February 1933.
