= Hans Mayer =

German literary scholar (1907–2001)

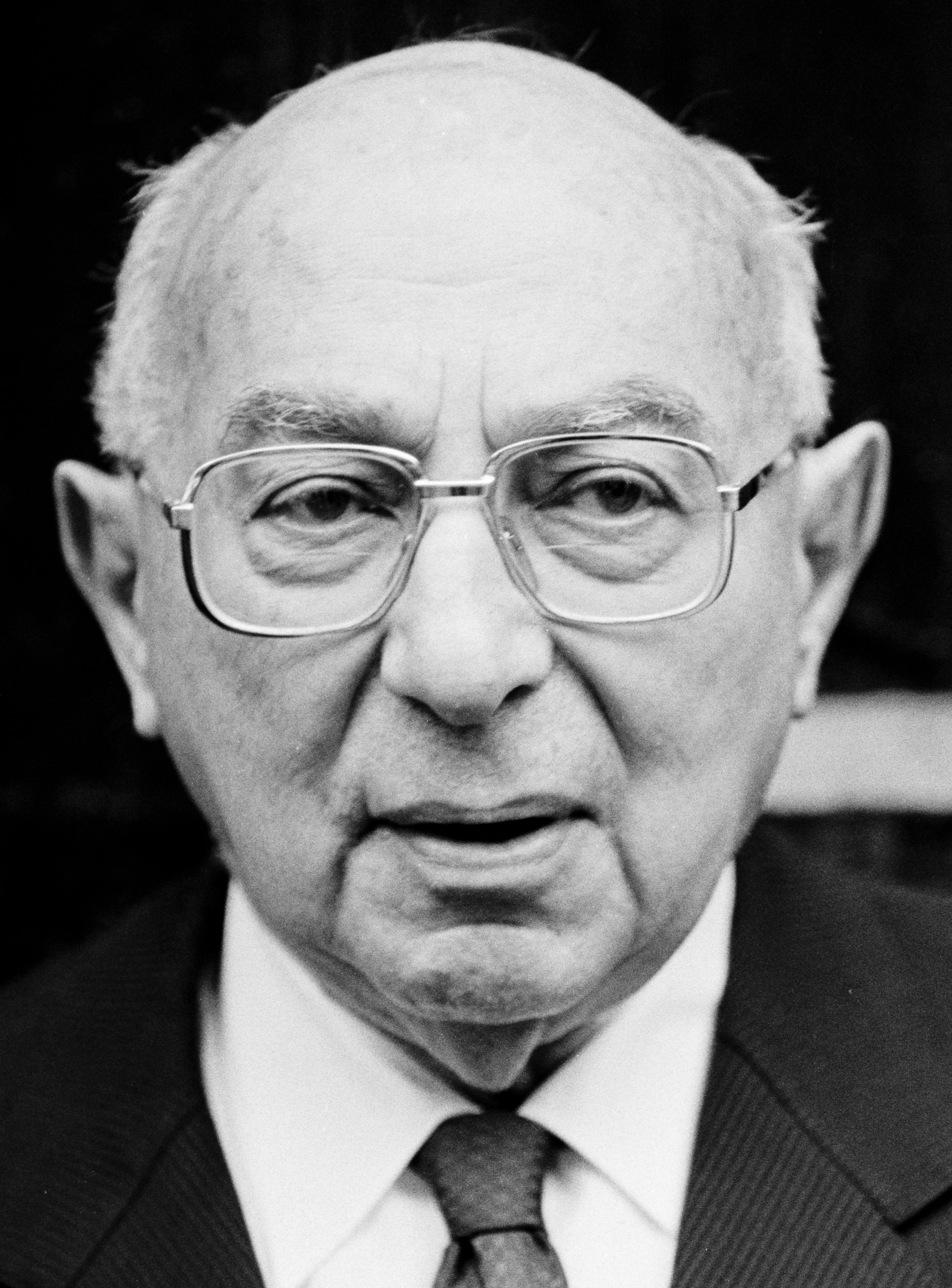
- Portrait of Mayer taken in St. Nicholas Church, 1993
- Born: 19 March 1907; Cologne, Rhine Province, German Empire
- Died: 19 May 2001 (aged 94); Tübingen, Baden-Württemberg, Germany
- Resting place: Dorotheenstadt Cemetery
- Other name: Martin Seiler
- Political party: Alsatian KPO
- Other political affiliations: SPD; SAPD; KPD(O)
- Movement: Socialism

Academic background
- Education: University of Cologne
- Thesis: Die Krise der deutschen Staatslehre (1930)
- Doctoral advisor: Hans Kelsen
- Influences: Carl Jacob Burckhardt

Academic work
- Discipline: Literary studies
- Sub-discipline: History of literature
- School or tradition: College of Sociology
- Doctoral students: Wolfgang Schivelbusch
- Notable works: Der Turm von Babel

Hans Mayer (pseudonym: Martin Seiler; 19 March 1907, Cologne – 19 May 2001, Tübingen) was a German literary scholar. Mayer was also a jurist and social researcher and was internationally recognized as a critic, author and musicologist.

== Life ==
Mayer was born in an upper-class Jewish family. He was influenced in his youth by the writings of Georg Lukács and Karl Marx. He was a socialist.

Mayer studied jurisprudence, political science, history and philosophy in Cologne, Bonn and Berlin and received his doctorate in 1930 with a thesis titled Die Krise der deutschen Staatslehre (transl. The Crisis of German Political Science). At the same time, he joined the SPD and worked on the magazine Der Rote Kämpfer (transl. The Red Fighter). In 1931, he moved to the SAPD, which expelled him again one year later because of his sympathy for the KPD-O. Since he was a Jew and a Marxist and therefore banned from his profession in July 1933, he fled in August 1933 to France, where he worked for a short time as the chief editor of the Die Neue Welt (transl. The New World), which was the daily newspaper of the Alsatian KPO. In 1934, Mayer had to flee to Geneva where he worked at the Graduate Institute of International Studies. Here, he received jobs from Hans Kelsen and Max Horkheimer as a social researcher. He left the KPD-O in 1935. Carl Jacob Burckhardt influenced his literary orientation during this time.

From 1937 to 1939, Mayer was a member of the College of Sociology, founded by Georges Bataille, Michel Leiris and Roger Caillois in 1937. There, he held a lecture about the secret political societies in German Romanticism and demonstrated how these secret societies already anticipated Nazi symbolism. Other exiles at the College were Walter Benjamin and Paul L. Landsberg.

After the end of the war, he returned to Germany in 1945. The Americans made him the cultural editor of the German news agency, DENA, the predecessor of the DPA, and later the chief political editor of Radio Frankfurt.

In 1948, he and his friend Stephan Hermlin, went to the Soviet occupation zone. In Leipzig he accepted a professorship for literary studies and became an influential critic of the new German literature. It was possible for him to cross between the East German and the West German world. In the East, he worked through his lectures and discussion circles, and in West Germany he was a welcome guest at meetings of Group 47. He was also in contact with Bertolt Brecht during this time.

His relationship with those in power in East Germany was characterized by more friction as of 1956. He resigned in 1963 and did not return to East Germany after a visit to a publisher in Tübingen. In 1965, he was appointed to a newly created chair for German literature at the University of Hannover. He held this chair until his retirement in 1973. After that, he lived in Tübingen as an honorary professor. As he grew older, he lost his eyesight, but he was still able to dictate his texts. For that reason, his publications extend well into his old age.

== Work ==
The work of Mayer includes more than forty volumes. He studied Georg Büchner, Thomas Mann, Montaigne, Robert Musil, James Joyce, Uwe Johnson, Günter Grass, Hans Henny Jahnn and others in his investigations on the history of literature.

While he was in exile in 1936, he began the advance work for his great work about Büchner. This work about Büchner was later recognized by the University of Leipzig as his postdoctoral thesis which was required to qualify as a professor.

He released the collection of essays, Zur deutschen Literatur der Zeit, in 1962. In 1986, he followed this volume with the book, Das unglückliche Bewusstsein – Zur deutschen Literaturgeschichte von Lessing bis Heine. Ein Deutscher auf Widerruf is the title of his three-volume memoires of 1982.

The investigation, Außenseiter, which appeared in 1975, was considered by many to be his main work. In this volume, he deals with the literary portrayal of three groups, which have commonly been discriminated against in history: women, male homosexuals and Jews. He had his own experiences with belonging to two of these groups – as a Jew and as a homosexual.

Der Turm von Babel of 1991 is an obituary on East Germany. Its key sentence is frequently seen to be: "Das schlechte Ende widerlegt nicht einen möglicherweise guten Anfang" (transl. "The bad end doesn't disprove a possibly good beginning.") East Germany was the better of the two German states to him for a long time.

The last book published by Mayer is Erinnerungen an Willy Brandt from 2001.

== Tributes and criticism ==
Mayer was an honorary citizen of the city of Leipzig, had honorary doctorates from universities in Brussels, Wisconsin and Leipzig, was an honorary professor in Peking, was winner of the National Prize of East Germany, as well as the Bundesverdienstkreuz of the class Großes Verdienstkreuz mit Stern und Schulterband. He was honored with the Ernst-Bloch Prize in 1988. He was a member of the Academy of Arts, Berlin and an honorary member of the Sächsische Akademie der Künste.

Mayer, along with Benjamin, who was also with him at the College of Sociology, amongst others, belongs to the most important literary critics of the 20th century. Perhaps there is some correlation to a former competitive situation, which Marcel Reich-Ranicki wrote about in an obituary, which shows Mayer's life in an unflattering light. Reich-Ranicki describes the story of Mayer's life as a tragic story, as the story of a person who did not find a home anywhere.

== Selected literary works ==
- Karl Marx und das Elend des Geistes. Studien zur neuen deutschen Ideologie. Westkulturverlag Anton Hain, Meisenheim am Glan 1948.
- Richard Wagner, 1959
- Zur deutschen Literatur der Zeit, 1962
- Georg Büchner und seine Zeit, 1972
- Außenseiter, 1975 (translated into English as Outsiders: A Study in Life and Letters.)
- Ein Deutscher auf Widerruf, 1982
- Wir Außenseiter, 1983
- Widersprüche einer europäischen Literatur, 1984
- Das unglückliche Bewusstsein – Zur deutschen Literaturgeschichte von Lessing bis Heine, 1986
- Der Turm von Babel, 1991
- Versuch über Hans Henny Jahnn, 1994
- Erinnerungen an Willy Brandt, 2001
- Briefe 1948–1963. Publ. and annotated by Mark Lehmstedt, Leipzig 2006
