= Freie Presse (Alsace) =

German language newspaper

Freie Presse ('Free Press') was a German-language daily newspaper published in Alsace. It was published as Freie Presse für Elsass-Lothringen between 1898 and 1918, and as Freie Presse/La Presse Libre 1919-1939 and 1944–1960. The newspaper, edited by Jacques Peirotes, was one of the most consistently pro-French newspapers of Alsace.

The newspaper had a circulation of around 5,000 as of June 1930. It carried the byline "Sozialistisches Organ für das Departement des Nieder-Rheins" ('Socialist organ for the Bas-Rhin departement'). The newspaper was an organ of the French Section of the Workers' International (SFIO).
