= Die Neue Welt =

Alsacian newspaper

Die Neue Welt ('The New World') was a newspaper issued from Alsace, France. It was founded in the end of January 1921 by Charles Hueber, a local leader of the French Communist Party in Alsace. The newspaper was merged into the l'Humanité d'Alsace-Lorraine, the regional edition of the party newspaper l'Humanité, in 1923.

Die Neue Welt was revived as a daily newspaper by a section of Alsatian communists in early July 1929. The revived newspaper carried the byline "Deutschsprachigen Tagesorgan der Kommunistischen Partei Frankreichs. Region Elsaß-Lothringen" ('German-language daily organ of the Communist Party of France, Region Alsace-Lorraine'). As Die Neue Welt effectively competed with the established party paper l'Humanité d'Alsace-Lorraine, the launch of Die Neue Welt became a cause of expulsions from the Communist Party. Amongst those expelled was Georges Schreckler, the editor of Die Neue Welt. Die Neue Welt became the organ of the Opposition Communist Party of Alsace-Lorraine (KPO). At this point, Die Neue Welt had around 1,300 subscribers.

Between 1933 and 1934 Hans Mayer, a German-Jewish refugee and cadre of the Communist Party of Germany (Opposition), was an editor of Die Neue Welt. During Mayer's editorship, the newspaper took a more anti-fascist approach, at the expense of Alsatian autonomism. The newspaper labelled Nazi Germany as a 'Murder State', and in November 1934 it claimed that Hitler's public repudiation of territorial claims on Alsace-Lorraine was a sham. Die Neue Welt editor-in-chief Alfred Quiri called for the end of cooperation between KPO and pro-German clerical autonomists. With the increased influence of refugees in the editorial line of Die Neue Welt, German authorities banned it from sales in Germany in April 1933. Whilst the Nazis had expressed objections to the Marxist profile of the newspaper, it was primarily the attacks on Hitler's government that were cited as the reasons behind the ban.

The editorial line in Die Neue Welt caused some rifts between the refugees and Alsatian KPO cadres, who were unwilling to give up their Alsatian autonomist position for anti-Hitler politics. In 1934 the refugee group left the KPO.

By 1935 the newspaper claimed a circulation of between 2,800 and 3,500, but this claim was likely inflated. The newspaper was running with large deficits (estimated at 10,000 French francs monthly), deficits covered by funds from Germany. Die Neue Welt became frequently quoted in German media, as expressing the feelings of the Alsatian people. In April 1939, Die Neue Welt was merged with Elsaß-Lothringische Zeitung (the organ of the Landespartei).
