= Jacques Peirotes =

French Alsatian politician (1869–1935)

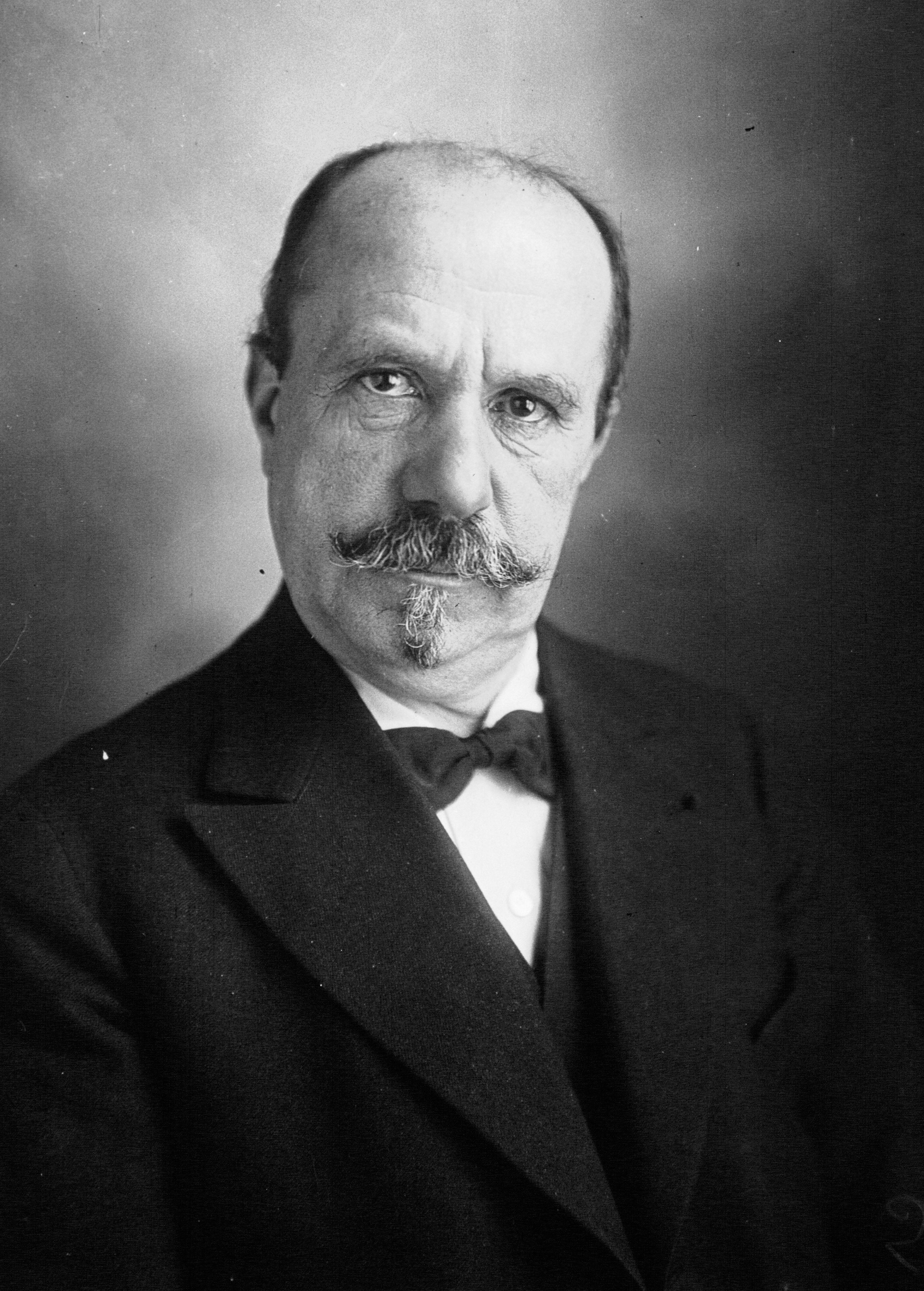
Jacques Peirotes

Jacques Laurent Peirotes (11 September 1869 Strasbourg – 4 September 1935) was a French and German politician, mayor of Strasbourg from 1919 to 1929.

== Biography ==
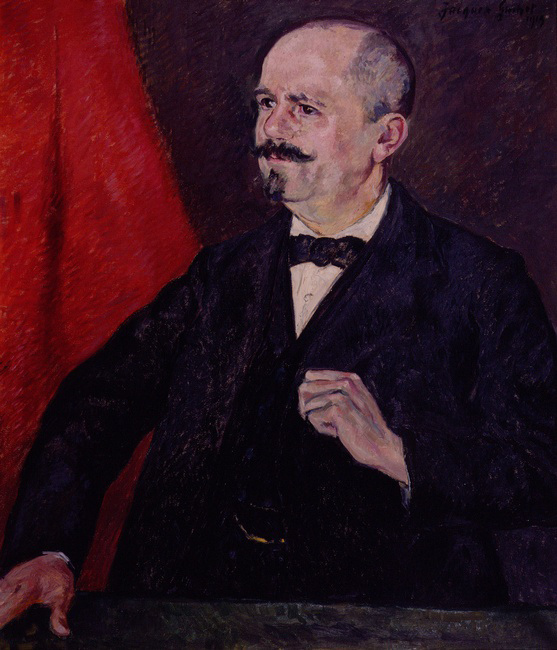
Portrait of Peirotes by Jacques Gachot (1919)

The young Jacques Peirotes, son of a carpenter working at the locomotives factory of Graffenstaden, learned the job of typographer while entering into politics.

Since 1900, he was editor of the Freie Presse (Free Press) that was an organ of the Strasbourg branch of the Social Democratic Party which he joined in 1895. In 1902, he became its political manager. In 1913, the newspaper was printed in 9,500 units.

He came into the town council of Strasbourg in 1902 and was elected councilor of the southern canton of the Kreis Straßburg (Stadt) in 1903. He also was deputy in the second chamber of the Landtag of the Reichsland Elsass-Lothringen from 1911 to 1918 and deputy of Colmar in the Reichstag in 1912.

When the First World War broke out, he was exiled by German authorities to Hanover and designated as Banned from Alsace. He then published his political manifesto Neutral oder Französisch (Neutral or French). When he came back at the end of the war, he had the skill to neutralize the soldiers and workers councils. He sat as president of the Municipal Commission of Strasbourg from November 10–29, 1918. On November 10, 1918 he proclaimed the forfeiture of the German Empire and the advent of the French Republic. He asked to the French authorities to hasten the troops arrival which ended the Socialist revolution taking place.

Elected mayor of Strasbourg in 1919 and reelected in 1925, he created a 'municipal office for cheap accommodations' which built 3,000 social apartments in ten years. He was beaten in the 1929 election by a coalition of communists and autonomists that led Charles Hueber to the town hall.

A street was later named after him in the Swiss quarter of Strasbourg (Krutenau).

== Bibliography ==
- Jean-Claude Richez, Léon Strauss, François Igersheim, Stéphane Jonas, 1869-1935, Jacques Peirotes et le socialisme en Alsace, BF Éditions, Strasbourg, 1989, 220 p. read online : Danièle Voldman, Vingtième Siècle – Revue d'histoire, 1990, Nr 1, p. 135.

== Sources ==
This article is a translation of the similar article in the French Wikipedia.
