= Georges Weill =

French politician

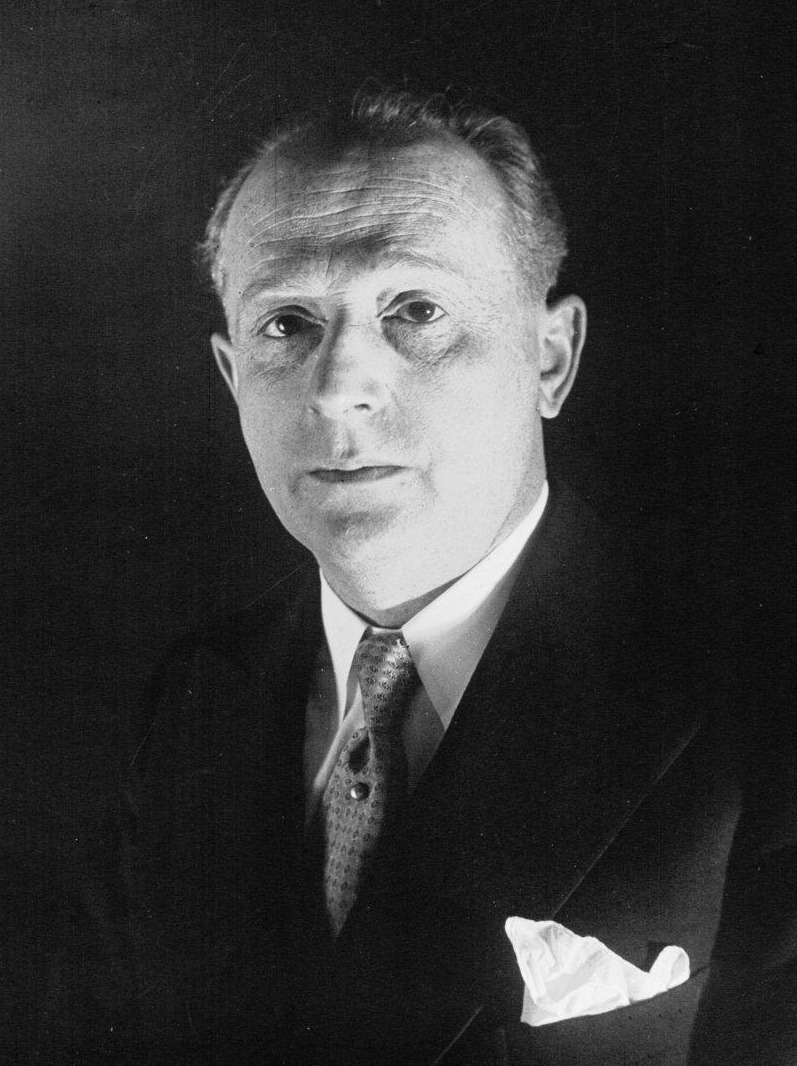
- Georges Weill – 1933

Member of the Reichstag for Alsace-Lorraine, Germany
- In office 1912 – 5 August 1914

Member of the National Assembly for Bas-Rhin, France
- In office 11 May 1924 – 31 May 1928
- In office 8 May 1932 – 31 May 1936

Personal details
- Born: 17 September 1882 Strasbourg, Alsace-Lorraine, Germany
- Died: 10 January 1970 (aged 87) Paris, France
- Party: Social Democratic Party of Germany
- Other political affiliations: French Section of the Workers' International
- Parent(s): Elias and Melanie Weill

Military service
- Allegiance: France
- Years of service: 1914–1918
- Battles/wars: World War I

Georges Weill (17 September 1882 – 10 January 1970) was an Alsatian politician who was a Socialist member of parliament for Metz in the German Reichstag from 1912 to 1914. After the outbreak of World War I, he declared his loyalty to France and joined the French Army. In response he was stripped of German citizenship on 5 August 1914. After the Allied victory the provinces of Alsace-Lorraine returned to France, he was elected general counsel of the Lower Rhine in 1919 and became a socialist member of the French Parliament for the Bas-Rhin district.

== Early life ==
Georges Weill was born in 1882 to the merchant Elias Weill and his wife Melanie Weill Dreyfus in Strasbourg. He came from a bilingual family living in the German-controlled Alsace-Lorraine. He attended secondary school in Strasbourg, the Faculté des Lettres (Sorbonne) in Paris, the law and political science faculty of the University of Strasbourg and received his PhD in 1904 as Doctor of Political Sciences in Strasbourg with the German economist Georg Friedrich Knapp. From 1900 to 1901, he was the editor of the magazine Le Mouvement socialiste in Paris, in 1902–1904 research assistant at the Chamber of Commerce in Strasbourg, in 1905 the editor of the Free Press in Strasbourg and in 1906–1910 editor of the Franconian Daily Mail in Nuremberg. His writings got him in trouble, and he frequently suffered fines because of press offenses and had two prison sentences.

== Political career ==
From 1912 he was a member of the German Reichstag for the Social Democratic Party of Germany (SPD) for the constituency of the Alsace-Lorraine city of Metz. He won the constituency against the previous mandate holder, the Lorraine protester Albert Grégoire, in the runoff election with the support of the Liberals. He was with famed socialist Jean Jaurès when Jaurès was assassinated on 31 July 1914.

When war broke out in 1914 he joined the French Army on 5 August as an interpreter and publicly declared to stand on the side of France. For joining the French, he was stripped of his German citizenship and he lost his seat in the Reichstag. The German SPD disavowed him.

From 1924 to 1928 and from 1932 to 1936, he was a member of the French National Assembly. In 1928, he was in a runoff election with candidate Jean-Pierre Mourer. He was vice president of the National Republican League (Ligue républicaine national), a party founded by former French President Alexandre Millerand.

During the Second World War he lived in the city of Algiers. He died in Paris on 10 January 1970, at the age of 87.

== Bibliography ==
Notes

References

- French National Assembly (2014). "Georges WEILL". French National Assembly.
- German Imperial Statistical Office (1913). The Reichstag elections of 1912, Issue 2. Berlin: Verlag von Puttkammer & Mühlbrecht (in German) (1913 ed.). Statistics of the German Empire, Vol 250.
- Strauss, Léon & Charles Baechler (2002). Nouveau dictionnaire de biographie alsacienne, vol. 39 (in French).
- The Daily Telegraph (December 23, 1914). "Member of Reichstag Fighting for France". The Daily Telegraph. ISSN 0307-1235. OCLC 49632006.
- The Evening World (December 22, 1914). "Vorwaerts Condemns German Deputy's Act in Joining The French". The Evening World. ISSN 1941-0654. OCLC 9368601.
- The Ogden Standard (December 22, 1914). "German Socialist in French Army". Standard-Examiner. Ogden City, Utah.
