= College of Sociology =

The College of Sociology (French: Collège de Sociologie) was a loosely-knit group of French intellectuals, named after the informal discussion series that they held in Paris between 1937 and 1939, when it was disrupted by the war. Its main objective was to find out signs of the sacred in everyday social life.

== History ==
Founding members include some of France's most well-known intellectuals of the interwar period, including Georges Bataille, Roger Caillois, Pierre Klossowski, Jules Monnerot, Pierre Libra and Georges Ambrosino. Participants also included Hans Mayer, Jean Paulhan, Jean Wahl, Michel Leiris, Alexandre Kojève and André Masson. Walter Benjamin was invited to give lectures, but these never materialized.

The members of the College were united in their dissatisfaction with surrealism. They believed that surrealism's focus on the unconscious privileged the individual over society and obscured the social dimension of human experience.

In contrast to this, the members of the College focused on "Sacred Sociology, implying the study of all manifestations of social existence where the active presence of the sacred is clear." The group drew on work in anthropology and sociology which focused on the way that human communities engaged in collective rituals or acts of distribution such as potlatch. It was here, in moments of intense communal experience, rather than the individualistic dreams and reveries of surrealism, that the College of Sociology sought the essence of humanity.

The group met for two years and lectured on many topics, including the structure of the army, the Marquis de Sade, English monarchy, literature, sexuality, Hitler, and Hegel. This focus, and in particular their interest in indigenous cultures, was part of a wider trend towards primitivism of the time.

== Sources ==
- Hollier, Denis. Le Collège de Sociologie, 1937-1939. Paris: Gallimard. ISBN 2-07-032763-9. (A collection of texts from Caillois, Leiris, Bataille, and others which were presented at the Collège, with a well documented introduction.)
- Moebius, Stephan. Die Zauberlehrlinge: Soziologiegeschichte des Collège de Sociologie. Konstanz: UVK. ISBN 3-89669-532-0. (About the Collège, its members (Bataille, Leiris, and Walter Benjamin), sociological impact (Marcel Mauss, Robert Hertz, Emile Durkheim) and its influence on other philosophers (Derrida, Foucault, Baudrillard, etc.)
- Richman, Michèle H. Sacred Revolutions: Durkheim and the College De Sociologie. Minneapolis: University of Minnesota Press. ISBN 0-8166-3974-4.
