= Volksfront (Alsace) =

The Volksfront ("People's Front") was a political coalition in Alsace, France, that was formed in 1928 by the Popular Republican Union (UPR), a group of communists led by Charles Hueber, Progressives led by Camille Dahlet and the Autonomist Landespartei. The Volksfront had the goals of greater autonomy for Alsace, safeguards for the German language, the promotion of the Alsatian economy and administrative autonomy for the region. The Volksfront largely represented a continuation of the defunct Heimatbund. The Volksfront showed some similarities of the 1911 National Union, which also had been a loose coalition. Co-operation between Alsatian communists and clerical autonomists had begun with the events of Bloody Sunday (1926).

Regarding the sensitive issue of relations between church and state, the Volksfront avoided publicly taking a clear stand.

The Volksfront launched two candidates in a parliamentary by-election in 1928, which had been called as two elected autonomist assemblymen (Eugène Ricklin and Joseph Rossé) had been allowed to take their seats): Marcel Stuermel and René Hauss.

The Volksfront won the 1929 municipal election in Strasbourg by defeating the incumbent socialist mayor, Jacques Peirotes, who had been backed by an anticlerical and assimilationist coalition. The Volksfront won 22 seats in the municipal council. It formed a municipal government with Hueber as mayor and Michel Walter as deputy mayor and also gained a strong presence in the municipal election in Colmar.

After the election, the group around Hueber was expelled from the French Communist Party and formed the Opposition Communist Party of Alsace-Lorraine, which became a new constituent of the Volksfront.

As the Landespartei moved closer to National Socialism, with a discourse that was increasingly antisemitic and antidemocratic, divisions began to appear in the Volksfront. The UPR was alienated by the antidemocratic, anti-Catholic and antireligious discourse of the National Socialists and deserted the coalition, followed by Dahlet's Progressives in 1933. The Volksfront was dissolved in 1935.
