= Smychka =

Social movement in Soviet Russia and USSR

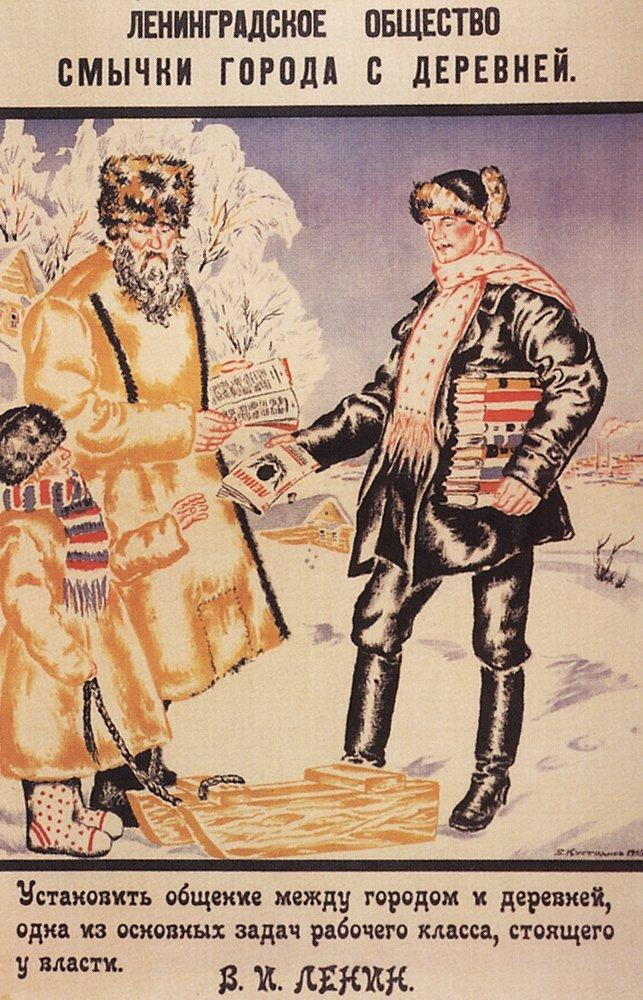
Poster of the Leningrad Society for the Bonding of City and Country by Boris Kustodiev

Smychka (Russian: смычка) was a popular political term in Soviet Russia and the Soviet Union. It can be roughly translated as "collaboration in society" "union", "alliance", "joining the ranks". The generic meaning of the noun "смычка", derived from the verb "сомкнуть", is joining of two things: contact, joint, linkage, coupling, like joining the two opposite branches of a railroad whose construction was started from both ends.

The best known example of the usage of the term was the motto and the Soviet politics of "smychka of the city and the village" ("смычка города и деревни"), which was understood as the alliance of proletariat and the poor peasantry.
