= Jean-Pierre Mourer =

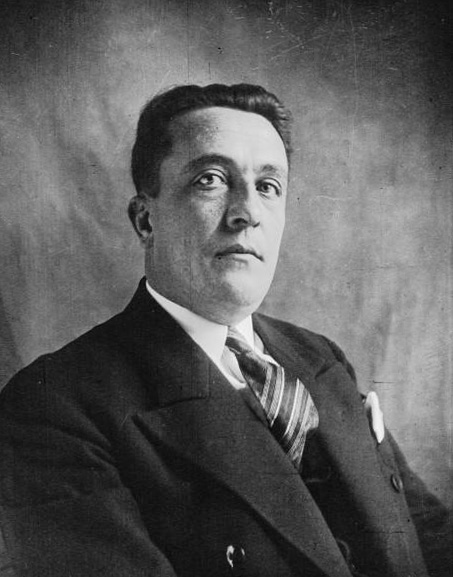
Jean-Pierre Mourer

Jean-Pierre Mourer (19 August 1897 in Wittring, Moselle – 10 June 1947 in Île Napoléon, Mulhouse) was an Alsatian politician. He was elected to the French National Assembly in 1928, 1932 and 1936.

A railway employee, Mourer joined the French Communist Party and was elected to parliament in April from the second constituency of Strasbourg. In a second round of voting, he defeated Georges Weill by 7,140 votes against 6,013. In parliament, he was a member of the committees on Algeria, colonies and protectorates, liberated regions, hygiene and economy.

Mourer was expelled from the French Communist Party in July 1929. In October 1929, he became one of the leaders of the Opposition Communist Party of Alsace-Lorraine.

In the 1932 election, he defeated the socialist Marcel-Edmond Naegelen with 6,575 votes against 6,192 in the second round.

In the 1936, he was re-elected in the second round with 5,844 votes.

In the autumn of 1939, he was arrested along with other prominent Alsatian autonomists. In 1940, he was freed by German forces, and was appointed as the Kreisleiter (Chief Administrator) of the Mulhouse district by the German authorities. His appointment as Kreisleiter materialized in spite of reservations from the Gestapo, who were reluctant to see a former communist occupy such a strategic office. During this period, he Germanized his name to 'Hans Peter Murer'.

Murer was arrested by American forces in Munich in August 1945. He was detained at Bad Mergentheim, and was later handed over to French authorities and imprisoned at Mulhouse jail.

After the war, the Court of Justice of Haut-Rhin sentenced him to death on 26 February 1947 for collaboration with the Germans. He was executed by a firing squad, headed by De Torres, on 10 June 1947, on Île Napoléon.

Notably, evidence in Mourer's case focused primarily not on collaboration during the occupation itself but rather on the contacts he allegedly had with Germany prior to the war.
