= Bukharinism =

Socialist tendency developed by Nikolai Bukharin

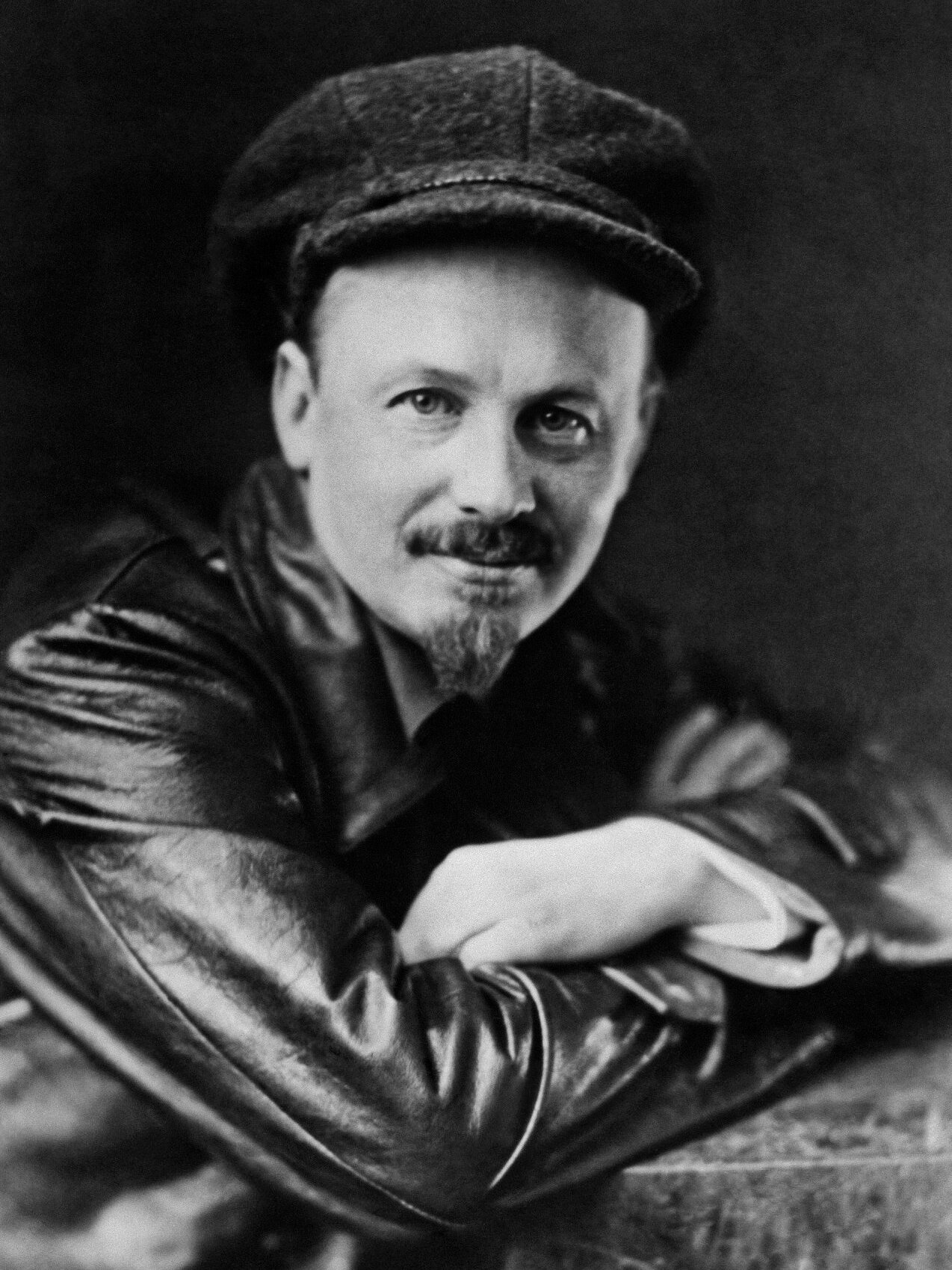
Nikolai Bukharin

Bukharinism (Russian: Бухаринизм, romanized: Bukharinizm) was the political and economic system of thought developed by the Bolshevik revolutionary and Soviet politician Nikolai Bukharin. It was characterized by its advocacy of gradual, evolutionary development toward socialism in the Soviet Union, based on a mixed economy and a stable alliance between the workers and the peasantry. Bukharinism served as the primary economic policy of the Communist Party of the Soviet Union from 1925 until Joseph Stalin abolished it in 1929.

Bukharin's theories grew out of his analysis of the specific conditions of revolutionary Russia, a politically socialist state presiding over an underdeveloped, agrarian economy. His program, often described as a form of market socialism, centered on the continuation of the New Economic Policy (NEP). It proposed using market relations to encourage both the state-owned industrial sector and private peasant agriculture, believing that the prosperity of the peasantry would stimulate industrial growth. This strategy of "growing into socialism" was designed to achieve social harmony and gradual development, in contrast to the theories of the Left Opposition, which advocated for rapid industrialization at the expense of the peasantry.

From 1925 to 1927, the Communist Party, under the leadership of a duumvirate of Bukharin and Stalin, officially followed Bukharin's program. However, by 1928, Stalin had turned against these policies, launching the Great Break, which entailed forced collectivization and rapid heavy industrialization. Bukharin and his allies, who became known as the Right Opposition, were defeated in the ensuing political struggle and removed from power in 1929. The subsequent official campaign against Bukharinism discredited its ideas as a "right deviation" and a restorationist threat.

Despite its suppression, the legacy of Bukharinism endured. Its principles resurfaced in the Soviet Union during the Khrushchev Thaw and influenced reform communism movements in Eastern Europe, such as the Prague Spring, and in China under Deng Xiaoping. During perestroika in the 1980s, Bukharin was politically rehabilitated and his ideas became a central inspiration for the reforms of Mikhail Gorbachev.

== Theoretical foundations ==
Bukharinism emerged from Nikolai Bukharin's attempts to create a comprehensive Marxist theory applicable to the conditions of the Soviet Union in the 1920s. While he was a prolific writer on many subjects, his core theoretical work centered on imperialism, the nature of the state, and the laws of societal development, culminating in a system of thought that underpinned his political and economic programs.

=== State capitalism and imperialism ===
Bukharin's earliest major theoretical contributions came during his wartime emigration (1911–1917), when he produced systematic studies of modern capitalism and imperialism in response to the collapse of the Second International. In works such as Imperialism and World Economy (1915) and "Toward a Theory of the Imperialist State" (1916), he developed a new analysis of contemporary capitalism that became a constituent part of Bolshevik ideology.

Drawing on and radicalizing the work of Rudolf Hilferding, Bukharin argued that the old laissez-faire capitalism of competing enterprises had been transformed into a new stage he termed "state capitalism". He described this as the "fusing" of industrial and banking trusts with the state, creating monolithic "state capitalist trusts" that managed the entire "national economy". This process eliminated internal market anarchy and competition, transforming each advanced national economy into a highly organized and militarized structure. The bourgeois state was no longer a mere political superstructure but had become the primary organizer of the economy, a "colossal, almost monstrous, power" which Bukharin depicted as a "New Leviathan". This national consolidation, however, only transferred competition to the world stage. Imperialism, in his view, was the inevitable foreign policy of state capitalism, where "state capitalist trusts" engaged in a "competition of gigantic, consolidated, and organized economic bodies." This global competition for resources, markets, and colonies would inevitably lead to imperialist wars and, ultimately, to proletarian revolution.

These ideas, formulated before Vladimir Lenin's more famous Imperialism, the Highest Stage of Capitalism, significantly influenced Lenin's own work and became an orthodox Bolshevik interpretation of modern capitalism. Unlike Bukharin's uniform model, however, Lenin's work emphasized the uneven and contradictory nature of this development. Bukharin's vision of the all-encompassing "Leviathan state" also instilled in him a deep-seated fear of bureaucratic despotism and "permanent coercion," a concern that would profoundly shape his later political thought and his warnings against "rampant bureaucracy and administrative caprice" during the New Economic Policy (NEP) era.

=== Equilibrium and historical materialism ===
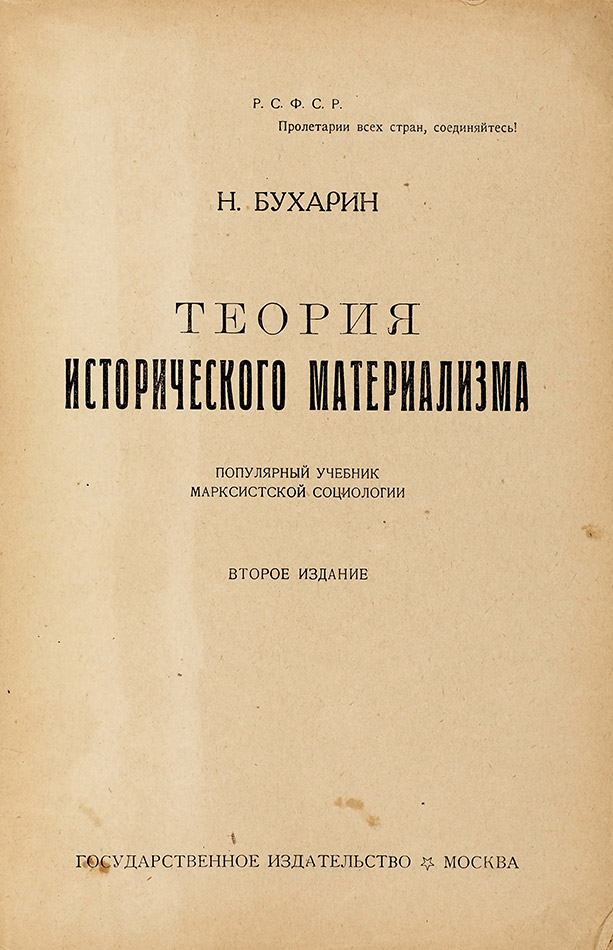
Title page of Historical Materialism: A System of Sociology (1921)

The theoretical core of Bukharinism as a system was his theory of equilibrium, which he fully elaborated in his 1921 work, Historical Materialism: A System of Sociology. In this book, Bukharin sought to develop historical materialism into a comprehensive, "proletarian sociology" that could answer the challenges of modern non-Marxist social theory. He broke from the Hegelian tradition of dialectics, which he found tainted with idealism, and instead proposed a mechanistic model, influenced by the thought of Alexander Bogdanov, to explain social change.

According to Bukharin's theory, all social systems exist in a state of equilibrium. There is an "external equilibrium" between society and nature, and an "internal equilibrium" among society's different elements (its technology, social structure, and ideology). Social change occurs when this equilibrium is disturbed. A disturbance in the external equilibrium—for instance, through the development of new productive forces (technology)—necessitates a change in the internal structure to restore balance. This adaptation can occur in two ways: through a gradual, evolutionary process, or through a violent, revolutionary upheaval when the old social structure (the "envelope") becomes a fetter on the developing productive forces.

While this framework was designed to provide a universal law of social development, its emphasis on social harmony and the integration of all social elements into a cohesive whole reflected Bukharin's growing conviction that a stable, growing society required "at least a minimal harmony of its components." This sociological awareness became a cornerstone of his later political programs, which stressed cooperation, civil peace, and social integration over conflict. His mechanistic and determinist approach, however, was criticized by other Marxists such as Georg Lukács and Antonio Gramsci for downplaying the role of conscious human activity and the dialectical nature of social contradictions.

== Economic program ==
Bukharinism is most closely associated with the economic and political program he developed during the New Economic Policy (NEP) era, from 1925 to 1928. This program represented the official policy of the Soviet state during that period and was the first systematic attempt to articulate a path to socialism for an isolated, backward, and peasant-dominated country. It was a doctrine of gradual, evolutionary, and peaceful development, standing in sharp contrast to the "revolutionary-heroic" tradition of the Left and the later policies of Stalinism.

=== The worker–peasant alliance (smychka) ===
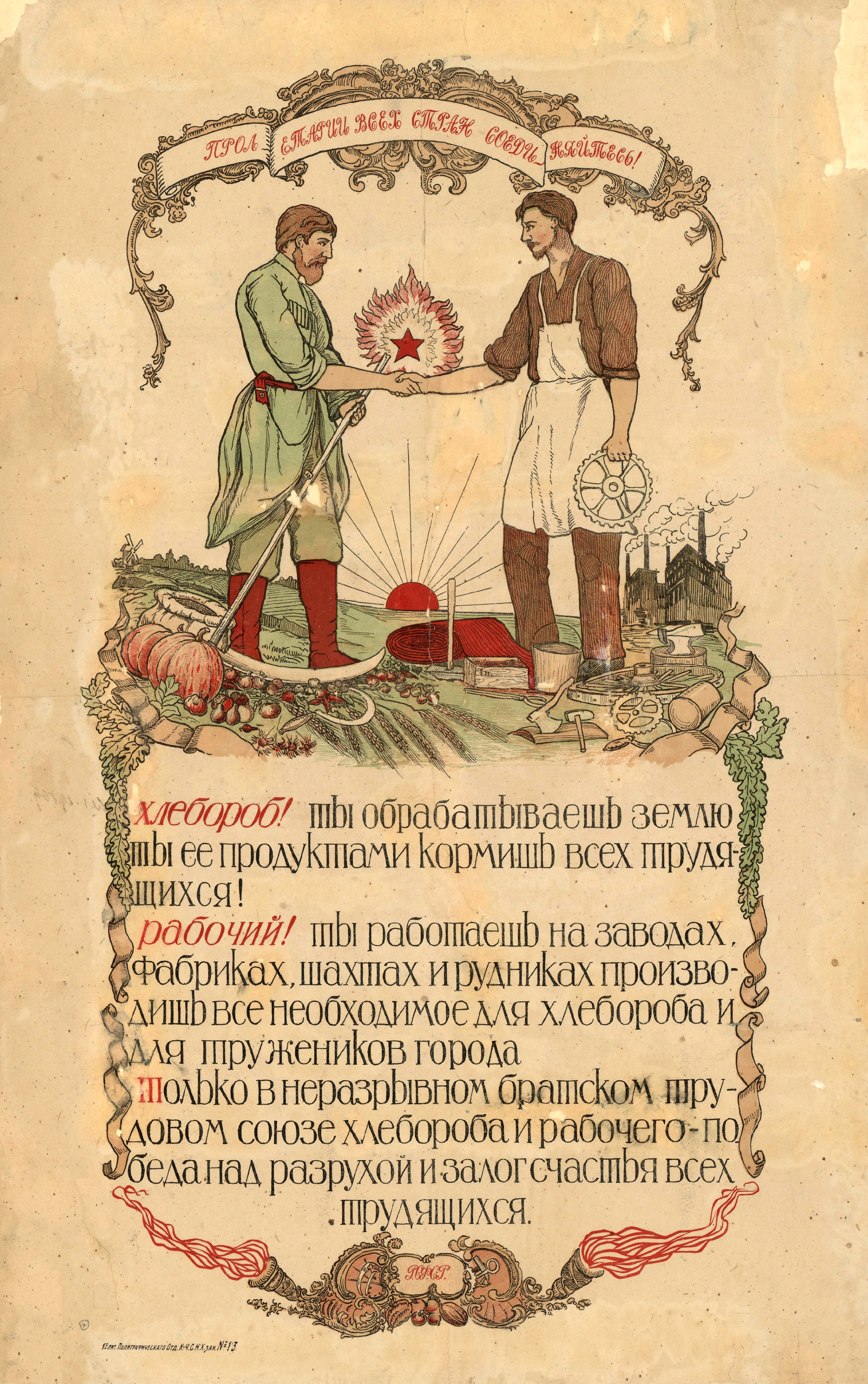
Soviet poster promoting the worker–peasant alliance (smychka), 1921

The "alpha and omega" of Bukharin's thinking was the preservation and strengthening of the smychka, or the political and economic alliance between the proletariat and the peasantry. He saw the smychka as the central lesson of the Russian Revolution and the "fundamental question of our revolution". He reinterpreted the October Revolution not just as a proletarian uprising but as a combination of a proletarian revolution and a "peasant war," which ensured its victory. Consequently, he argued, any policy that risked a conflict with the peasantry was "unacceptable" and suicidal for the Bolshevik regime, as the peasantry constituted the vast majority of the population.

This conviction formed the basis of his unwavering opposition to the Left Opposition's program, which he believed would alienate the peasantry by extracting a heavy "tribute" from agriculture to fund industrialization. Bukharin's emphasis on the smychka led him to view Soviet society as "basically a two-class society" of workers and peasants. He increasingly spoke of the peasantry as a largely undifferentiated whole, focusing on the "middle peasant" as the central figure of agriculture and a crucial ally to be won over, rather than an enemy to be neutralized.

=== Market relations and "growing into socialism" ===
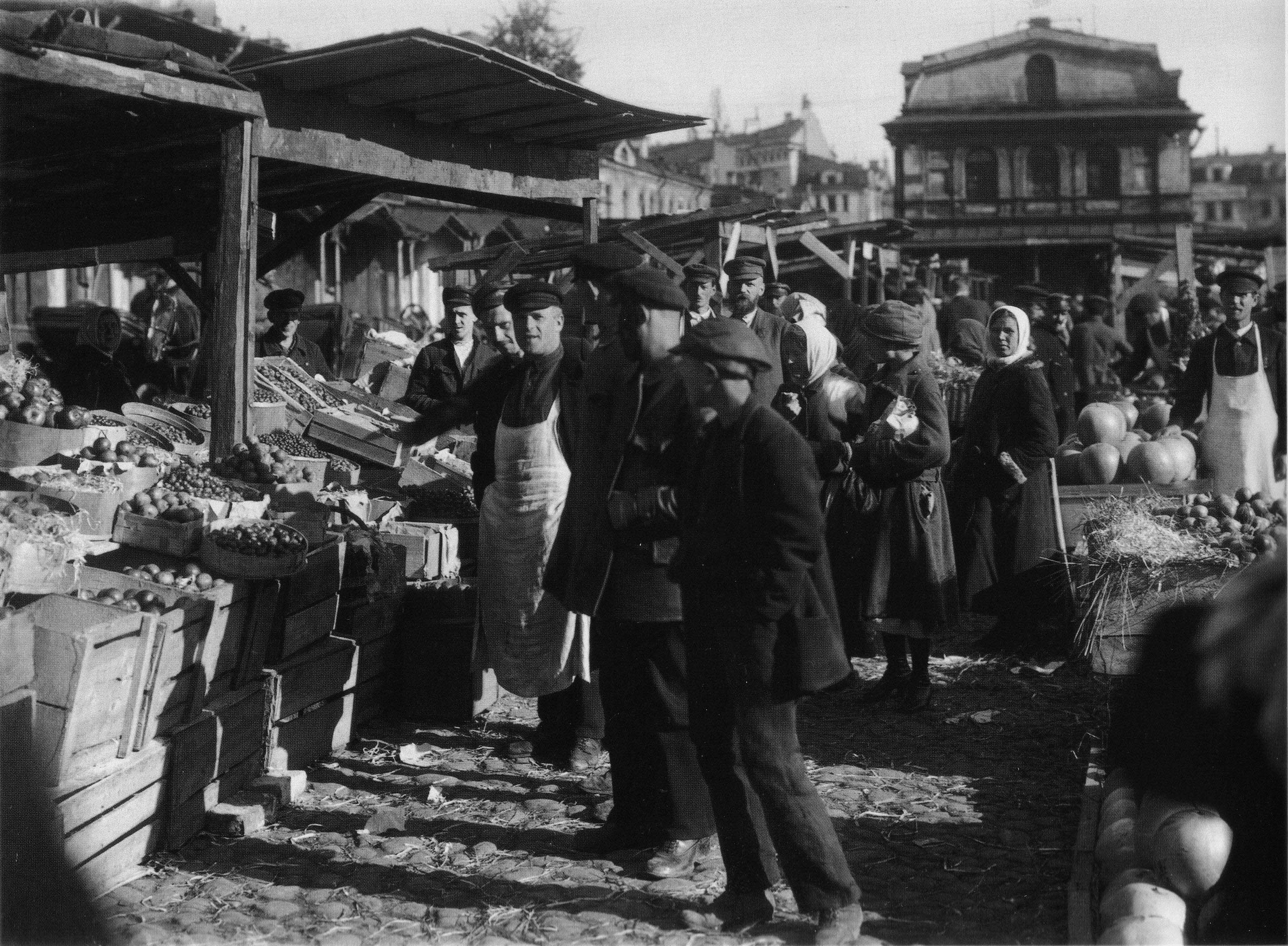
Peasants selling fruits and vegetables in Leningrad, 1924

Bukharin's economic strategy was to build socialism "on the basis of market relations." Unlike Lenin and Leon Trotsky, who viewed the NEP as a necessary but temporary "strategic retreat," Bukharin came to see it as the only viable road to socialism. He advocated for conciliatory policies that would encourage both private and state sectors to "evolve into socialism in mutually beneficial conditions and without further bloodshed."

Bukharin argued that the central problem facing the Soviet economy was stimulating peasant demand, which would in turn drive industrial growth. His main economic argument from 1924 to 1926 was that "the greater the buying powers of the peasantry, the faster our industry develops" and that "accumulation in socialist industry cannot occur for long without accumulation in the peasant economy." This stood in direct opposition to Yevgeni Preobrazhensky's "law of primitive socialist accumulation," which proposed that industrial growth had to be funded by exploiting the peasant sector through "nonequivalent exchange." Bukharin condemned this as a policy that would "kill the goose that lays the golden egg," leading to "industrial stagnation" by destroying the peasant market.

His program called for "unleashing commodity turnover" by encouraging peasant prosperity. Through the market, state industry and the millions of small peasant economies would form an "economic smychka." The state would regulate this market relationship through price policy, aiming to provide cheap industrial goods to the peasantry. This process would lead to a gradual "growing into socialism," where the socialist sector would slowly and peacefully displace the private sector through economic competition. As he explained, "we will come to socialism precisely through market relations." In a private letter, he even expressed a desire to "move more rapidly toward a more 'liberal' form of Soviet rule."

Bukharin did not expect or want the private sector to remain forever, because for him "the advantages of "socialist" trade—a public service, not an endeavor to extort the highest prices possible according to the laws of supply and demand—seemed clear enough to ensure the Nepmen's ultimate defeat". In 1926/1927, however, he changed his ideas, at least slightly, realizing "that the state could not significantly expand the country's industrial base without, first, a much larger commitment of resources and, second, a greater reliance on planning as opposed to market forces"; he concluded, while continuing to accept the basic principles of NEP, "including the indefinite existence of a large private sector", that private entrepreneurs "should be taxed more heavily (to secure funds for industrial investment) and regulated more closely (so that their activity would not undermine the state's planning)."

=== Agricultural policy and cooperatives ===
The "high road to socialism" in the countryside, according to Bukharin, was through agricultural cooperatives. He rejected immediate, large-scale collectivization as an "arithmetic truth" that was unfeasible and undesirable, arguing it would be seen as a "parasitic Communist institution" by the peasants. Instead, he championed a gradual, voluntary path based on the peasant's self-interest as a "small owner." This outlook was heavily influenced by the work of the non-Marxist agrarian economist Alexander Chayanov, who emphasized the logic of the family farm and the potential of cooperation.

Bukharin proposed a "ladder" of cooperation, beginning with marketing, consumer, and credit cooperatives. These would appeal to the peasant's desire for immediate benefits, such as cheaper credit and better prices. By drawing peasants into this network of circulation, the cooperatives would act as "the organized bridge" linking state industry with the peasant economy. As these simple cooperatives grew, Bukharin argued, they would "grow into the system of our socialist institutions," eventually leading the peasantry towards higher forms of cooperation, including production collectives. This theory was epitomized by his controversial 1925 slogan directed at the peasantry: "enrich yourselves, accumulate, develop your economy." Though he was forced to retract the slogan, he stood by its meaning: that the prosperity of all peasant strata, including the better-off kulak, would ultimately benefit the socialist economy.

In 1928, Bukharin opposed forced collectivization, proposing instead a gradual replacement of the private economy with a public sector and cooperatives; this would have bring, over time, the kulaks to the same level as the rest of the rural population. He argued that, in order to achieve socialism in the most favorable way, and, as far as possible, without crises, the most appropriate combination of the fundamental elements of the national economy was necessary.

== Political and social program ==
Bukharin's economic program was accompanied by a call for a fundamental change in the political practices of the Bolshevik party-state, which he termed "normalization" of the Soviet regime. Bukharin called his overall philosophy and program "socialist humanism".

=== "Civil peace" and "revolutionary legality" ===
The core of Bukharin's political program was the replacement of civil war with "civil peace under the command of the proletariat." The period of "mechanical repression" and "bloodletting" was over, he argued. Class struggle would continue, but in peaceful forms: as economic competition in the marketplace and as an ideological struggle for the "soul" of the peasantry. This new era required a transition to "revolutionary legality," ending the "administrative arbitrariness" (proizvol) and "lawlessness" that were remnants of War Communism. He advocated for "firm legal norms," the restoration of the authority of local soviets, and an end to the de facto immunity of Communist officials from prosecution. The state's primary function was no longer repression but "peaceful organizational work."

=== The state and the danger of bureaucracy ===
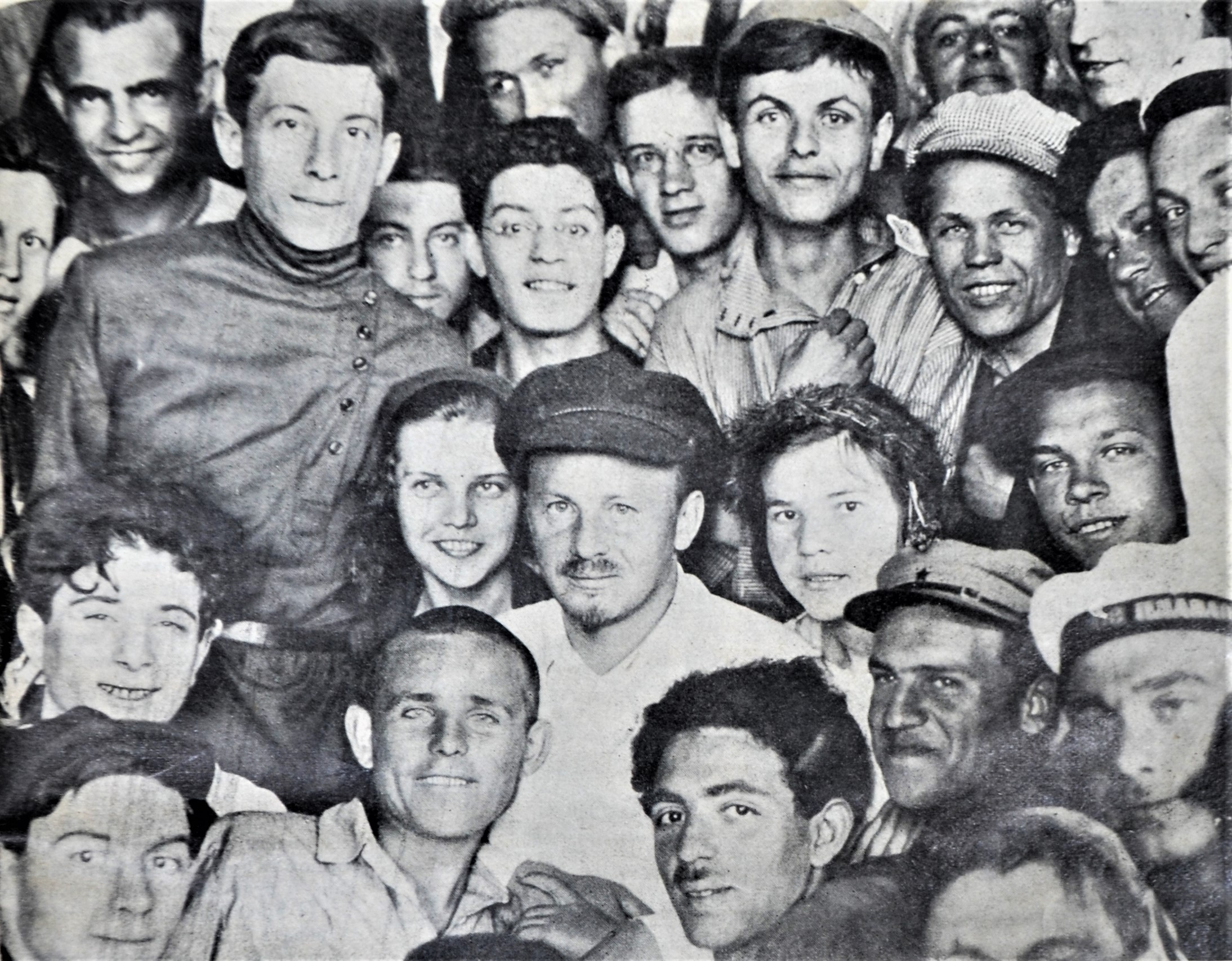
Bukharin (center) at a conference of news reporters in Moscow, 1926

Bukharin's turn toward moderation was deeply influenced by his fear of the "New Leviathan"—a tyrannical, bureaucratic state. After 1921, he became a persistent critic of "colossal" bureaucracy, which he saw as a "parasitic" and irrational force that impeded economic development. Drawing on his earlier theoretical work on the state and influenced by the elite theories of Robert Michels, he warned of the "enormous danger" that a new "monopolistic caste" or "new ruling class" could emerge in the Soviet Union. This new class would not be based on ownership of property but on "monopolistic" authority and privilege, leading to a new form of "military-feudal exploitation of the peasantry." His antidote was the promotion of "voluntary organizations" and "mass initiative at the lower levels"—from cooperatives to scientific societies—which would create a vibrant civil society and act as a check on the party-state bureaucracy. However, critics like Donny Gluckstein have argued that Bukharin's solution was a passive, cultural one focused on education, rather than one based on empowering the proletariat through active class struggle.

=== Cultural pluralism ===
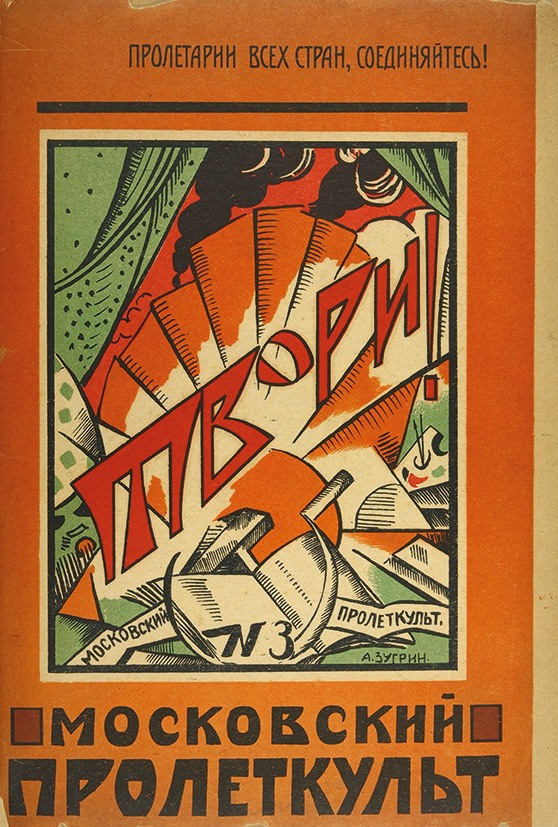
1921 cover of the Moscow Proletkult journal Tvori! (Create!)

During the NEP era, Bukharin was the Politburo's most prominent defender of cultural and intellectual pluralism. While he believed in the eventual triumph of a "proletarian culture," he vigorously opposed achieving it through "methods of mechanical coercion." He was a prominent supporter of the Proletkult movement, which aimed to create a new, distinctly proletarian culture, in contrast to Lenin and Trotsky, who stressed the need to critically assimilate the cultural heritage of the past. He was the chief author of the party's 1925 resolution on literature, which repudiated claims to a party monopoly, guaranteed protection for non-party "fellow travelers," and called for "maximum competition" among literary groups. He advocated for a "socialist humanism" that would embrace "the entire world of emotions," arguing that the new society required a "powerful, rich, and variegated art" that could only grow from "diversity and quality" and "a wide freedom of competition."

== Evolution and defeat ==
Bukharin's political trajectory was marked by a significant evolution from the left wing of the Bolshevik Party to its right. This shift was central to the intra-party struggles of the 1920s, which ultimately ended in the defeat of Bukharinism and the rise of Stalinism.

=== From Left Communist to Right Bolshevik ===
In 1918, during the controversy over the Treaty of Brest-Litovsk, Bukharin emerged as the leader of the Left Communists, a faction that opposed Lenin's call for peace with Germany and instead advocated for a "revolutionary war". This early position was characterized by revolutionary maximalism, a faith in the imminent European revolution, and a deep hostility to any compromise with imperialist powers. The Left Communists also opposed Lenin's initial economic plan of "state capitalism" in the spring of 1918, advocating instead for rapid and extensive nationalization. The "collapse of our illusions" following the end of the Russian Civil War and the introduction of the NEP in 1921 prompted Bukharin to rethink his earlier positions, leading to a dramatic turnabout. By 1924, he had become the leading theorist of moderation, gradualism, and the NEP, embodying the party's right wing.

=== The Right Opposition and the struggle with Stalin ===
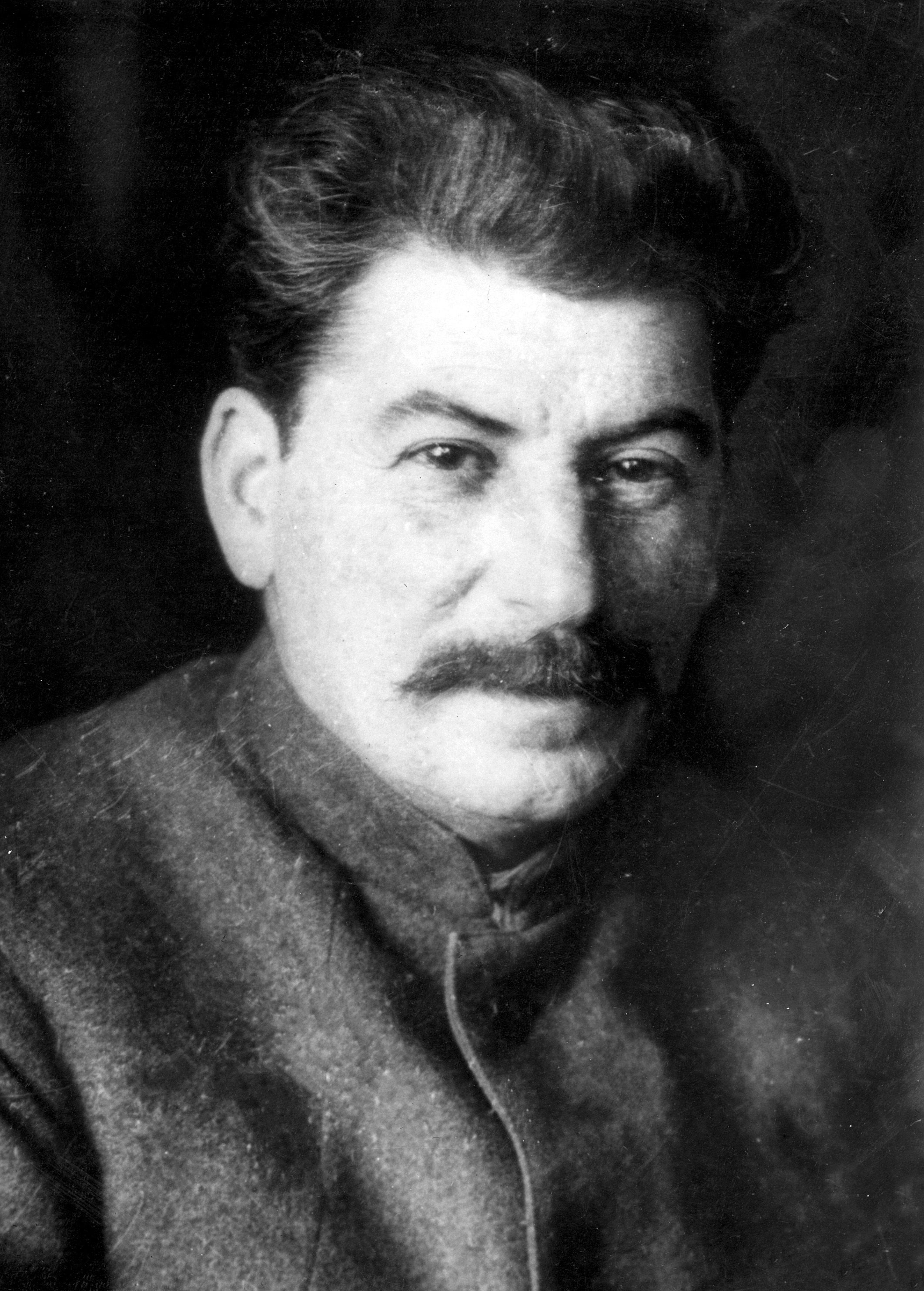
Joseph Stalin in the 1920s

From 1925 to 1927, Bukharin and Joseph Stalin led the party as a duumvirate, with Bukharin providing the ideological and policy direction and Stalin controlling the party apparatus. This alliance fractured in 1928 over the 1928 grain crisis. Stalin responded to the grain shortages by advocating a return to "extraordinary measures"—forced requisitions—which he termed a "tribute" from the peasantry to fund industrialization. Bukharin saw this as a revival of War Communism and a policy of "military-feudal exploitation" that would destroy the smychka and lead to "civil war" with the peasantry, warning presciently that Stalin would "have to drown the revolts in blood" and that the outcome would be a "police state".

In the ensuing conflict, Bukharin, supported by Premier Alexei Rykov and trade union leader Mikhail Tomsky, formed the leadership of the Right Opposition. They defended the principles of NEP and advocated for a continuation of moderate, market-based policies. Despite having considerable support within the party, the state apparatus, and the country at large, the Right was outmaneuvered by Stalin, whose control over the party machinery allowed him to isolate and defeat them. Bukharin and his allies were formally defeated at a Central Committee plenum in April 1929 and, after a brief period of resistance, capitulated in November 1929.

=== Repudiation and "eradication" ===
The defeat of the Right Opposition was followed by a massive official campaign to "eradicate Bukharinist influence." Bukharin's entire theoretical and political legacy was condemned. His economic policies were vilified as "kulak"-oriented and pro-capitalist; his theory of equilibrium was labeled mechanistic and anti-Marxist; and his calls for moderation were branded as "rotten liberalism". The "Bukharin school" of young theorists was dismantled, and his followers were persecuted. This ideological assault was a necessary prelude to Stalin's "revolution from above," as it repudiated the entire framework of NEP and enshrined the "warfare themes and policies of Stalinism" as official party ideology. The purpose was to criminalize the alternative Bukharin represented and render it "forever anathema". Bukharin himself became a non-person, and his ideas a "right deviation"—the most dangerous heresy in the party. This process culminated in his arrest in 1937 and his execution in 1938 following the last great Moscow show trial.

== Legacy ==
=== Posthumous reputation and rehabilitation question ===
For two decades after his execution, Bukharin remained an official anathema, his name synonymous with treason. The process of de-Stalinization under Nikita Khrushchev led to a slow and incomplete re-evaluation. In 1956, Khrushchev implicitly exonerated Bukharin of the criminal charges against him, and in 1962 an official spokesman confirmed that he was "not a spy or terrorist." However, full political rehabilitation did not follow. The "Bukharin question" was intimately tied to the legitimacy of Stalin's collectivization, a cornerstone of the Soviet system. To reinterpret the NEP as a "historical alternative...would raise grave questions about the foundations of the existing Soviet system, particularly the monopolistic state command economy". While his name began to appear without pejorative comment, he officially remained an "anti-Leninist" whose policies threatened the revolution. During the conservative Brezhnev era, a "full ban on Bukharin" was reimposed.

=== Influence on reform communism ===
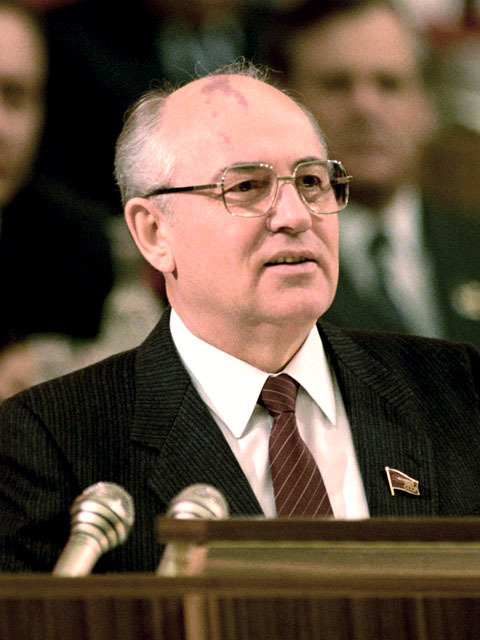
Mikhail Gorbachev

Despite its official suppression in the Soviet Union, Bukharinist ideas found a new life in the context of reform communism, particularly after Stalin's death. In the Soviet Union itself, the Khrushchev Thaw produced an outburst of "pseudonymous Bukharinism," as reformist planners, historians, and cultural liberals revived ideas on economic balance, market mechanisms, and cultural pluralism that echoed Bukharin's program, though without crediting him by name. For party reformers, the NEP was seen as a "lost and incalculably preferable alternative to Stalinism," and all thinking about reforming the economy "leads to NEP." During the era of perestroika, the reformist wing of the Communist Party under Mikhail Gorbachev explicitly rehabilitated Bukharin. Gorbachev needed Bukharin's "heretical alternative of the 1920s" to legitimize his own reforms, which led to a "Bukharinist Boom" where Bukharin was "virtually canonized" as a "forerunner of Gorbachev's perestroika reformation."

The influence was more explicit in Eastern Europe, where Bukharinist-style ideas and policies became central to anti-Stalinist reform movements. The programs of Imre Nagy in Hungary, the Prague Spring in Czechoslovakia, and reformist currents in Poland and Yugoslavia all included advocacy of market socialism, a mixed agricultural sector, and a more tolerant political and cultural sphere, representing a search for a non-Stalinist communist order. Bukharinist ideas were also studied in China in the late 1970s as the country began its own NEP-style reforms under Deng Xiaoping. In this sense, Bukharin's outlook and the NEP-style order he defended came to represent "the true prefiguration of the Communist future—the alternative to Stalinism after Stalin."

== See also ==
- Anti-Stalinist left
- Central planning
- Dengism
- Titoism

== Works cited ==
- Cohen, Stephen F. (1975). Bukharin and the Bolshevik Revolution: A Political Biography, 1888–1938. New York: Vintage Books. ISBN 0-394-71261-7.
- Cohen, Stephen F. (2011). Soviet Fates and Lost Alternatives: From Stalinism to the New Cold War. New York: Columbia University Press. ISBN 978-0-231-14897-9.
- Gluckstein, Donny (1994). The Tragedy of Bukharin. London: Pluto Press. ISBN 0-7453-0772-8.
