= Charles Hueber =

French politician

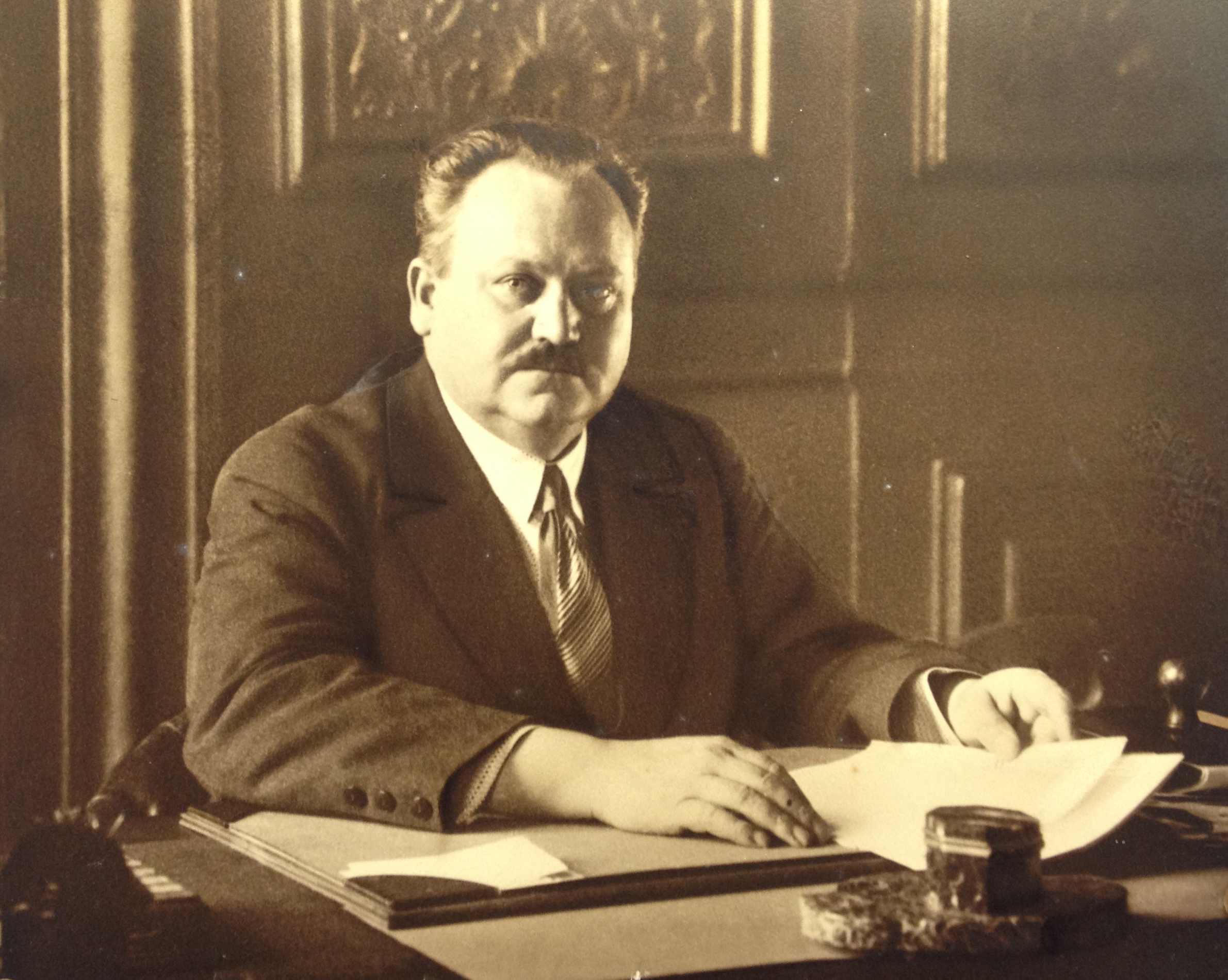

Member of the National Assembly for Bas-Rhin
- In office 3 May 1936 – 31 May 1942
- In office 11 May 1924 – 31 May 1928

Mayor of Strasbourg
- In office 1929–1935
- Preceded by: Jacques Peirotes
- Succeeded by: Charles Frey

Personal details
- Born: Charles Louis Hueber; 21 August 1883 Guebwiller, German Empire
- Died: 18 August 1943 (aged 59) Strasbourg, France

Charles Louis Hueber (21 August 1883 – 18 August 1943) was an Alsatian politician. He was the mayor of Strasbourg between 1929 and 1935, and a member of the French National Assembly twice.

Hueber became involved in political struggles at a young age. In 1900 he founded the Alsatian section of the Metal Workers Trade Union. In 1910 he became the secretary of the Social Democratic Party branch in Alsace-Lorraine. He fought in the German Army during World War I, and became a sergeant. During the revolutionary upsurge of 1918, Hueber acted as the chairman of the Strasbourg Soldiers Council.

At the end of the war, Hueber argued in favour of the creation of an independent, neutral Alsatian state.

During the December 1920 Congress of Tours, Hueber and several other Alsatian delegates supported the call to form a French Communist Party. A month later, he founded the communist newspaper Die Neue Welt. Hueber became the most prominent figure of the Communist Party in Alsace. He later became the editor of the Alsatian edition of l'Humanité.

In 1923 Hueber took part in an international communist meeting in Essen, organized to protest the French occupation of the Ruhr. He was arrested by French authorities for his participation in the event, a fact that elevated his standing within the Communist Party. He was imprisoned at La Santé Prison. The fame he achieved from being arrested helped him to get elected to the French National Assembly the following year. Hueber was elected from the 1st constituency of Bas-Rhin.

Hueber was elected mayor of Strasbourg in 1929 by the Volksfront (a coalition of communists and clerical autonomists). Hueber claimed that the electoral pact was a coalition of anti-imperialist forces. He was expelled from the Communist Party in the autumn of 1929. He became one of the main leaders of the Opposition Communist Party of Alsace-Lorraine (KPO).

During the period of 1933 and 1936 Hueber and his followers gradually moved towards pro-Nazi positions. However, he publicly denied to being antisemitic. In 1935 the Volksfront fell apart as the Republican People's Union (UPR) deserted it. Hueber lost his seat as Mayor to Charles Frey as the coalition that had backed him disappeared.

He was re-elected to the National Assembly in 1936.

During both of Hueber's National Assembly tenures, he formed part of the committee on Alsace-Lorraine. Hueber frequently addressed the Assembly in Alsatian language. On 8 December 1927 Hueber held a speech in Alsatian in the National Assembly, the content of which were so shocking for the Assembly that large chunks were stricken from the official protocol. Hueber had attacked the status of the French language in Alsace-Lorraine, stating that France was oppressing the Alsatian working class and that Alsace was under French colonial rule.

Hueber escaped arrest in the 1939 crackdown on Alsatian autonomist leaders, due to his deteriorating health. Hueber did not take part in the 1940 Congress of Vichy vote.

In 1941, Hueber became a functionary of the NSDAP. On 14 February 1942 Hueber was appointed municipal councilor of Strasbourg by the German authorities.
