= 1929 Strasbourg municipal election =

Elections to the municipal council of Strasbourg were held in France in May 1929 for a six-year term. An autonomist coalition, the Volksfront, defeated an anticlerical and assimilationist coalition of the incumbent socialist mayor, Jacques Peirotes. The Volksfront won 22 seats in the municipal council, with the French Communist Party winning 11 seats, the Autonomist Landespartei five seats, the Popular Republican Union four and the Alsatian Progress Party two seats. The socialist SFIO won four seats and the Democrats seven seats.

After the election, the Volksfront formed a municipal government with the soon-expelled regional Communist Party leader, Charles Hueber, as mayor and Michel Walter as deputy mayor.
