= Young Communist League of Germany (Opposition) =

Young Communist League of Germany (Opposition) Kommunistischer Jugendverband Deutschlands (Opposition)
- Leader: Alfred Albrecht (1932–)
- Headquarters: Berlin, Stuttgart
- Membership: ~1,000
- Ideology: Communism
- Mother party: Communist Party of Germany (Opposition)
- Magazine: Junge Kämpfer (1929–1931)

The Young Communist League of Germany (Opposition) (German: Kommunistischer Jugendverband Deutschlands (Opposition), abbreviated KJVD-Opposition, KJVDO, KJVO or KJO) was a youth organization in Germany. KJVD-Opposition was the youth wing of the Communist Party of Germany (Opposition).

== Organization ==
KJVD-Opposition had approximately 1,000 members. It was strongest in Thuringia and Saxony. Other areas where the organization was active were Berlin-Brandenburg, Wasserkante, Silesia, Württemberg and Hesse. KJVD-Opposition had a national school (Reichsschule), which could host 35 people at a time. At the school, the organization conducted political training, usually for two weeks at a time.

== Publications ==
KJVD-Opposition published the monthly Junge Kämpfer ('Young Fighter') in Berlin from 1929-1931, which was distributed amongst members and sympathizers of the movement. Junge Kämpfer was mainly edited by Walter Uhlmann. Another monthly KJVD-Opposition publication, Kommunistische Jugend-Politik ('Communist Youth Politics') dealt with organizational issues and was distributed amongst cadres.

== Under the Nazi regime ==
In 1932 the national leadership of KJVD-Opposition shifted from Berlin to Stuttgart. Around this time Alfred Albrecht became the national leader of KJVD-Opposition. Albeit a minor group in the German labour movement, KJVD-Opposition organized some resistance activities against the Nazi regime in the 1930s. Under Albrecht's leadership KJVD-Opposition formed a youth cartel of left-wing organizations, and conducted anti-fascist mobilizations in working-class neighbourhoods. Walter Uhlmann was the representative of KJVD-Opposition in the underground Berlin Committee of the mother party.
