= Communist Party of Germany (Opposition) =

Communist Party of Germany (Opposition) Kommunistische Partei Deutschlands (Opposition)
- President: Heinrich Brandler; August Thalheimer
- Founded: 1929
- Dissolved: 1933 (banned); 1939
- Split from: Communist Party of Germany
- Newspaper: Gegen den Strom
- Youth wing: Young Communist League of Germany (Opposition)
- Membership (1929): 6,000
- Ideology: Communism; Luxemburgism; Bukharinism
- Political position: Left-wing
- International affiliation: International Communist Opposition
- Colors: Red

The Communist Party of Germany (Opposition) (German: Kommunistische Partei Deutschlands (Opposition)), generally abbreviated as KPO or KPD(O), was a communist opposition organisation established at the end of 1928 and maintaining its existence until 1939 or 1940. After the rise of Adolf Hitler and the Nazi Party to power in January 1933, the KPO existed only as an illegal and underground organization. The group initially sought to modify, later to replace, the mainstream Communist Party of Germany (KPD) headed by Ernst Thälmann. The KPO was the first national section affiliated to the International Communist Opposition (ICO).

== Organizational history ==
=== Background ===
The KPO official organ (Gegen den Strom) continued to be produced after the Nazis' rise to power in 1933

The KPO represented the so-called Right Opposition in the KPD in distinction to the Trotskyist or Trotskyist-sympathising Left Opposition and the pro-Comintern centre faction. It was led by Heinrich Brandler and August Thalheimer who had led the KPD between 1921 and 1923. They were expelled from the KPD after organising a meeting to combat what they saw as corruption in their party after its central leader Ernst Thälmann defended a protégé, John Wittorf, from charges of theft despite his guilt. Thälmann was deposed by the Central Committee only to be reinstated by Joseph Stalin through the agency of the Comintern.

The secretary of the Hamburg organization of the KPD was found to have embezzled 2,000 marks from the party treasury for his own use. When accountants from national party headquarters discovered the crime, they were threatened with expulsion from the party by party leader Thälmann if they exposed the theft. The Comintern got wind of the scandal which led to a crisis in the German party with the Central Committee acting to remove Thälmann, with Thälmann joining in the unanimous vote. This presented a threat to the faction of the Communist Party of the Soviet Union headed by Joseph Stalin, who saw in Thälmann a reliable ally during a time of bitter factional warfare. As a result, the Presidium of the Comintern countermanded the German Central Committee's action, restoring Thälmann as secretary.

In October 1928, Brandler returned to Germany against the KPD's wishes. The corruption of Thälmann's Hamburg organization and its protection by the Stalin faction in Moscow was used as a pretext for Brandler and Thalheimer to issue a call for a meeting of their followers on 11 November 1928. Brandler, Thalheimer and their associates were bitterly criticized in an open letter from the Comintern on 19 December. Expulsion soon followed, with both Brandler and Thalheimer removed from the Communist Party of Germany in December 1928 and from the Communist Party of the Soviet Union and the Comintern in January 1929.

=== Formation ===
Brandler and Thalheimer gathered their supporters into a new organization called the Communist Party of Germany (Opposition) (KPO), a group which was founded at the 30 December 1928 meeting which had originally prompted the wave of expulsions. The group also launched a new communist opposition journal, Gegen den Strom (Against the Current).

Most of those who attended this conference were factional allies of Brandler and Thalheimer from previous years when they had headed the German Communist Party. The major exception was Paul Frölich, who had been allied with a third, so-called Conciliator faction which stood between the future KPO and the KPD leadership. Frölich and his partner Rosi Wolfstein, like Brandler and Thalheimer, had been allies and pupils of Rosa Luxemburg.

Throughout 1929, the KPD expelled followers of Brandler and Thalheimer as well as the Conciliator faction, who sought a factional truce between the party's feuding left and right. Perhaps 1,000 members of the German Communist Party were affected. These expulsions paralleled similar efforts to purge the Soviet Communist Party of followers of Nikolai Bukharin, Alexei Rykov and Mikhail Tomsky.

The KPO initially conceived of itself as a factional influence group, attempting to change the political line of the Communist Party of Germany rather than a new party in competition with it. The organization held a second conference in November 1929 at which in the words of M. N. Roy it "declared unequivocally that between Social Democracy and Communism there is no half-way house". Roy claimed that the KPO had 6,000 dues-paying members and was publishing eight weekly and bi-monthly publications by the fall of 1929, with a combined circulation of 25,000. Brandler was named Secretary of the organization at this time. While the group never met with broad influence or electoral success, it nevertheless became the first as well as one of the most prominent parties to be identified with the so-called International Right Opposition.

On 1 January 1930, the KPO attempted to expand its influence even further with the launch of a daily newspaper, Arbeiterpolitik. Financial problems led it a reduction of frequency and by 1932 the paper was being issued only once a week. Despite Roy's protestations that the KPO did not constitute an independent political party, it was not long before it had entered the field with its own candidates for office. It ran its own candidates in the 7 December 1929 provincial election in Thuringia, one of the organization's strongholds, although these garnered just 12,000 votes. In other elections, it supported the slate of candidates of the official Communist Party of Germany, including the candidacy of Ernst Thälmann for President in the election of March 1932.

The KPO counted approximately 1,000 members after its supporters had been expelled from the KPD, many of them local leaders of the party. In the years that followed, they failed to recruit any further adherents from outside the party and gradually decreased in number. The KPO backed the KPD on most public issues, but it did stand their own candidates in some elections and ran other campaigns. Their members were also active in the existing trade unions in contrast to the KPD which launched a policy of forming radical dual unions during the so-called Third Period between 1929 and 1934.

=== Drive for a united front against fascism ===
In the period when the KPD was denouncing the Social Democratic Party of Germany (SPD) as social fascists and retreating from joint anti-fascist work with non-Communists, Brandler and the KPO were strongly in favor of the establishment of a united front against the menace of Nazism and were particularly critical of the Communist Party's conception that "once the Nazis get into power, then will the united front of the proletariat rise and brush them aside". Instead, the KPO called for the immediate formation of a broad anti-fascist alliance including the Social Democratic-controlled trade union federation, the Social Democrats, Communists and the Socialist Workers' Party of Germany (SAPD).

Campaigning for a united front as a small group did not give the KPO more influence with the general public, but the threat of the Nazis did lead to a leftward movement within the SPD. This leftist tendency in the SPD left that party in 1931 and organised themselves as the SAPD which elements within the KPO felt they should join. After an internal struggle in which the majority of the KPO backed Brandler and Thalheimer, a minority led by Frölich and Jacob Walcher refused to accept the decisions of the fourth conference of the KPO held in January 1932. The leadership replied to this challenge by stating that the breach of discipline implied the minority had excluded itself from the organisation. The minority responded by joining the SAPD.

On 10 August 1932, the KPO weekly Arbeiterpolitik was banned for 13 weeks for violating President Paul von Hindenburg's emergency decree "against political excesses" by the conservative German government headed by Chancellor Franz von Papen. The ban was to take effect immediately, continuing until 15 November. The ban, along with similar measures taken against other organs of the left-wing press, helped make coordinated action against German ultranationalism more difficult.

Following the rise to power of Adolf Hitler and his ultranationalist Nazi Party on 30 January 1933 and the wave of anti-radical repression which ensued, Brandler and most of the KPO leadership fled to France. Brandler lived in Paris until the beginning of World War II, where he continued to be involved in communist politics.

=== Underground period ===
The KPO was only able to work legally for one more year before the Nazis came to power in January 1933. However, it was to go underground immediately in order to avoid persecution as far as possible. They were able to hold a conference in Denmark in April 1934 and maintain a national structure. In 1935, the Nazis stepped up the repression of all communist groups and trials of KPO members were reported in Weimar, Jena and elsewhere. The organisation ceased to operate at a national level and was now confined to exile circles and the Saarland. In the Saarland, they were able to function legally for a little longer due to its status as a French occupation zone. When a plebiscite was held on the matter of the region being returned to Germany, the KPO called on its supporters to vote for a Räterepublik (soviet) Saarland and to oppose unity with Nazi Germany. This was in contrast to the position of the KPD which supported the Saarland remaining under the control of France.

In exile with the leadership in Paris, the KPO continued to publish Gegen den Strom. Politically, it continued the previous line of the KPO and was supportive of the Comintern and of the Stalinist regime in the Soviet Union, its criticisms being reserved for the KPD. This began to change with the beginning of the Spanish Civil War and the deepening of the Great Purges in Russia. A number of KPO militants in exile were to travel to Spain and fought in the International Brigades that supported the Second Spanish Republic. Some were to find themselves persecuted by the Stalinists, a fate they shared with militants belonging to the Workers' Party of Marxist Unification (POUM).

=== Dissolution ===
There seems to have been a tendency within the KPO which wanted it to break more clearly from any support of Stalinism and in 1939 a Group of International Marxists appeared after its founders left the ranks of the KPO. This group signed a declaration of independent socialist parties, many associated with the International Workers' Front which had left the ICO and KPO. From this point on, there is little mention of either the new group or the KPO itself, with the fall of France, the leadership of the KPO had been forced to flee again and the organisation was effectively dissolved. Of the leading figures in the KPO, Brandler and Thalheimer were to spend the war exiled in Cuba, where the latter was to perish. Brandler returned to West Germany in 1949 and played a leading role in the Gruppe Arbeiterpolitik which stood in the tradition of the KPO, but he was never able to recover its former influence. Brandler died in 1967, but the group still exists and is based in Hamburg.

== See also ==
- Heinrich Brandler
- Das Volksrecht (Offenbach am Main)
- Lovestoneites
